= Lina Nerli Taviani =

Italian costume designer

- Born: Lina Nerli; 16 November 1937 (age 88); Pisa, Italy
- Occupation: Costume designer
- Years active: 1965–present
- Spouse: Paolo Taviani (died)
- Relatives: Vittorio Taviani (brother-in-law, deceased)

Lina Nerli Taviani (born 16 November 1937) is an Italian costume designer.

== Biography ==
Nerli began working as a costume designer in the 1960s and her first film work was on The Reckless directed by Giuliano Montaldo.

Since then, she has created costumes for over seventy films and television productions, most of which directed by her husband and her brother-in-laws Paolo and Vittorio Taviani.

== Partial filmography ==
- The Reckless (1965)
- Requiescant (1967)
- The Seed of Man (1969)
- Under the Sign of Scorpio (1969)
- Lettera aperta a un giornale della sera (1970)
- Wind from the East (1970)
- Corbari (1970)
- The Audience (1972)
- St. Michael Had a Rooster (1972)
- The Grand Duel (1972)
- Don't Touch the White Woman! (1974)
- Allonsanfàn (1974)
- A Sold Life (1976)
- Quanto è bello lu murire acciso (1976)
- Sahara Cross (1977)
- Padre Padrone (1977)
- Ecce bombo (1978)
- La Luna (1979)
- The Meadow (1979)
- Men or Not Men (1980)
- Tragedy of a Ridiculous Man (1981)
- The Night of the Shooting Stars (1982)
- Blow to the Heart (1982)
- Nostalghia (1983)
- The House of the Yellow Carpet (1983)
- Henry IV (1984)
- Kaos (1984)
- My Dearest Son (1985)
- A Tale of Love (1986)
- Devil in the Flesh (1986)
- Good Morning, Babylon (1987)
- The Rogues (1987)
- Private Access (1988)
- Cavalli si nasce (1988)
- I ragazzi di via Panisperna (1989)
- The Secret (1990)
- The Sun Also Shines at Night (1990)
- Rossini! Rossini! (1991)
- Parenti serpenti (1992)
- Fiorile (1993)
- The Bull (1994)
- Dear Goddamned Friends (1994)
- The Second Time (1996)
- The Elective Affinities (1996)
- Vesna Goes Fast (1996)
- You Laugh (1998)
- Holy Tongue (2000)
- Accidental Detective (2003)
- Working Slowly (Radio Alice) (2004)
- The Caiman (2006)
- The Lark Farm (2007)
- Civico zero (2007)
- We Have a Pope (2011)
- Long Live Freedom (2013)
- Cha cha cha (2013)
- Wondrous Boccaccio (2015)
- Rainbow: A Private Affair (2017)

== Awards ==
=== David di Donatello Awards ===
- 1983: Nomination for Best Costume Design for The Night of the Shooting Stars
- 1992: Best Costume Design for Rossini! Rossini!
- 1993: Nomination for Best Costume Design for Fiorile
- 1997: Nomination for Best Costume Design for The Elective Affinities
- 2006: Nomination for Best Costume Design for The Caiman
- 2007: Nomination for Best Costume Design for The Lark Farm
- 2012: Best Costume Design for We Have a Pope
- 2015: Nomination for Best Costume Design for Wondrous Boccaccio

=== Nastro d'Argento Awards ===
- 1988: Best Costume Design for Good Morning, Babylon
- 1993: Best Costume Design for Parenti serpenti
- 1994: Nomination for Best Costume Design for Fiorile
- 1997: Nomination for Best Costume Design for The Elective Affinities
- 1999: Nomination for Best Costume Design for You Laugh
- 2007: Nomination for Best Costume Design for The Lark Farm
- 2011: Best Costume Design for We Have a Pope
