= Giuliani G. De Negri =

Italian film producer and screenwriter

- Born: Gaetano De Negri; 1924; Genoa, Kingdom of Italy
- Died: 18 May 1992 (aged 67–68); Rome, Italy
- Other names: Giuliani · G. De Negri
- Occupation(s): Film producer · screenwriter
- Years active: 1950–1990

Gaetano De Negri (1924 – 18 May 1992), known professionally as Giuliani G. De Negri, was an Italian film producer and screenwriter. He is best known for his collaborations with film directors Paolo and Vittorio Taviani, having penned some and produced all of their films since 1961.

== Life and career ==
Gaetano De Negri was born in Genoa in 1924. After the German occupation of Northern Italy during World War II, he joined and fought with the Italian Resistance in his home region of Liguria. His nom-de-guerre Giuliani would later serve, along with the addition of his initial and his surname, as the pseudonym with which he'd be credited in his film work.

After the war, De Negri became interested in films about social and political issues, "searching for an incisive, unprejudiced [...] artistically unpleasant cinema" to make. In 1950 he joined Carlo Lizzani's Cooperativa Spettatori Produttori Cinematografici, which, through an unprecedented system of direct financing from the viewers, aimed to produce films otherwise unable to obtain funding; De Negri made his debut by co-writing and executive producing the first of the cooperative's only two films, Attention! Bandits! (1951), directed by Lizzani.

After producing a segment of the anthology film Die Windrose (1957), which marked the debut of Gillo Pontecorvo, in 1961 he co-founded the production company Ager Film along with Lizzani. De Negri then created another cooperative, XXI Marzo Cinematografica, dedicated to the production of works by first-time directors.

He first met Paolo and Vittorio Taviani in 1961, when they just had to halt the shooting of their first fiction feature film A Man for Burning (1962; co-directed with Valentino Orsini) due to a lack of funding, then helping them complete production. Since then, he produced and sometimes co-wrote all of the couple's films up to The Sun Also Shines at Night (1990), as well as various films directed by Orsini. His work with them has been described as that of "a co-author, more than just that of a producer." De Negri received twice the David di Donatello for Best Producer for to his collaborations with the Taviani brothers, in 1983 for The Night of the Shooting Stars and in 1985 for Kaos, as well as the Nastro d'Argento for Best Screenplay for the former.

He died in 1992 after a long illness at the Gemelli Polyclinic in Rome, where he was hospitalized.

== Filmography ==
Year	Title	Notes
1951	Attention! Bandits!	Executive producer Also screenwriter
1955	Giovanna	Short documentary film; Re-released as segment of Die Windrose (1957)
1961	Gold of Rome	Also screenwriter
1962	A Man for Burning	
1963	Outlaws of Love	Also screenwriter
1964	The Reckless	Also story writer
1967	The Subversives	
1969	Under the Sign of Scorpio	
1969	I dannati della Terra	
1970	Corbari	
1972	St. Michael Had a Rooster	
1972	The Assassination	
1974	Fischia il sesso	
1974	Allonsanfàn	
1977	Padre padrone	
1979	The Meadow	
1980	Men or Not Men	Also screenwriter
1982	The Night of the Shooting Stars	Also screenwriter; David di Donatello for Best Film; David di Donatello for Best Producer; Nastro d'Argento for Best Screenplay
1984	Kaos	David di Donatello for Best Producer; Nominated – David di Donatello for Best Film
1985	My Dearest Son	Also screenwriter
1987	Good Morning, Babylon	
1990	The Sun Also Shines at Night	
1990	Dicembre	
