= Donatella Palermo =

Italian producer

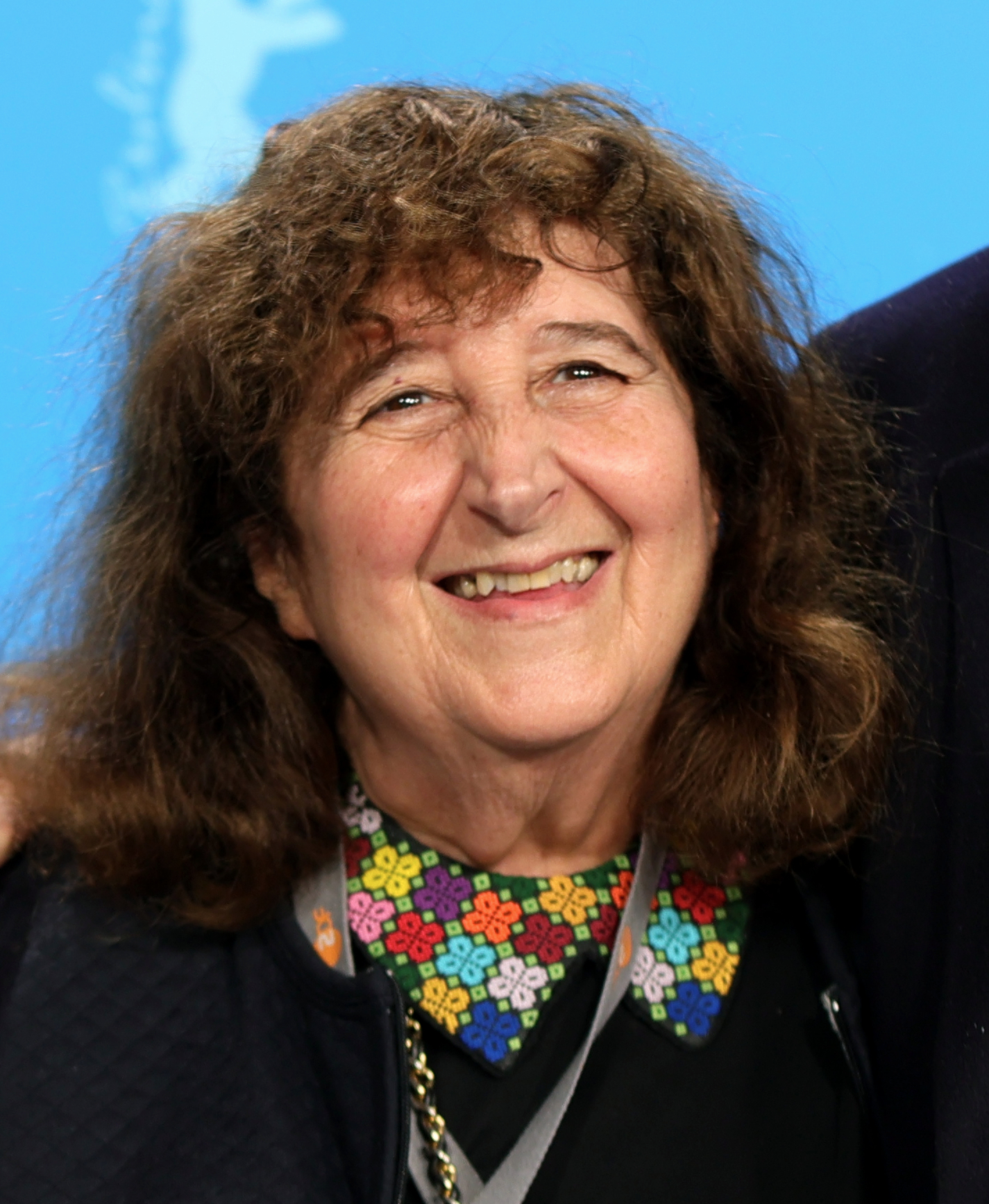
Donatella Palermo (2022)

Donatella Palermo is an Italian producer. She received Academy Award for Best Documentary Feature nominations for Fire at Sea with director Gianfranco Rosi at 89th Academy Awards.

== Career ==
Donatella Palermo started her career as a projectionist, later she moved on to production. By 2000, Palermo had already produced such successful film as To Die for Tano, Viol@, and Appassionate by Tonino De Bernardi. In 2015, she met Gianfranco Rosi and produced his documentary Fire at Sea. The film won the Golden Bear in Berlin. Her second Berlinale-winning project was Caesar Must Die by Taviani brothers.

== Filmography ==
- 2024 - Of Dogs And Men (docudrama) (producer)
- 2020 — Notturno (documentary) (producer)
- 2020 — Last Words (producer)
- 2016 — Fire at Sea (Fuocoammare) (Documentary) (producer)
- 2015 — Wondrous Boccaccio (producer)
- 2012 — L'Isola dell'angelo caduto (executive producer)
- 2012 — Tell No One (line producer)
- 2012 — Caesar Must Die (executive producer) / (co-producer)
- 2009 — Poeti (Documentary) (producer)
- 2009 — The Red Shadows (producer)
- 2007 — Una notte (associate producer)
- 2007 — Night Bus (executive producer)
- 2006 — The Ball (producer)
- 2006 — Lettere dal Sahara (producer)
- 2006 — Gemelline (Short) (producer)
- 2003 — Cinghiali of Portici (producer)
- 2003 — Letters in the Wind (producer)
- 2003 — Cuore scatenato (producer)
- 2002 — L'inverno (associate producer)
- 2000 — South Side Story (producer)
- 1999 — Appassionate (producer)
- 1998 — Viol@ (producer)
- 1997 — To Die for Tano (producer)
- 1993 — Niente stasera (producer)
- 1991 — Il senso della vertigine (producer)
- 1991 — Footsteps on the Moon (producer)
- 1989 — Orlando sei (executive producer)

== Awards and recognition ==
- 2022: Franco Cristaldi Award for Leonora addio.
- 2021: she was selected one of the most influential women in global Entertainment industry by Variety magazine.
- 2017: Academy Awards nomination for Best Documentary Feature for Fire at Sea
- 2016: Best Documentary Feature by International Documentary Association for Fuocoammare
- 1998: Best Producer Award by Italian National Syndicate of Film Journalists for To Die for Tano
