= Grazia Volpi =

Italian film producer (1941–2020)

- Born: Rosanna Grazia Volpi; 29 March 1941; Pontedera, Italy
- Died: 7 February 2020 (aged 78); Viareggio, Italy
- Occupation: Film Producer
- Years active: 1968-2020
- Spouse: Roberto Perpignani

Grazia Volpi (29 March 1941 – 7 February 2020), was an Italian film producer. She was one of the first women in Italy who achieved the position of film producer.

== Biography ==
She started working in the late 1960s as general organizer and production manager on the set of the Taviani brothers' films.

Then she became coordinator of "Una Cooperativa Cinematografica", a production company created by the Taviani brothers in 1973. In 1975 she made her debut as a film producer for the Aata cooperative with the films Quanto è bello lu murire acciso by Ennio Lorenzini and The Suspect by Francesco Maselli.

In 2012 she won the David di Donatello for the best producer for the film Caesar Must Die, directed by Paolo and Vittorio Taviani.

=== Personal life and death ===
She was married to film editor Roberto Perpignani. Volpi died on 7 February 2020, at the age of 78.

== Partial filmography ==
- Quanto è bello lu murire acciso (1975)
- The Suspect (1975)
- Young Distance (1988)
- The Sun Also Shines at Night (1990)
- Fiorile (1993)
- Seven Sundays (1994)
- State Secret (1995)
- The Elective Affinities (1996)
- You Laugh (1998)
- Rosa and Cornelia (2000)
- The Lark Farm (2007)
- The Father and the Foreigner (2011)
- Caesar Must Die (2012)
- Wondrous Boccaccio (2015)
