= Omero Antonutti =

Italian actor (1935–2019)

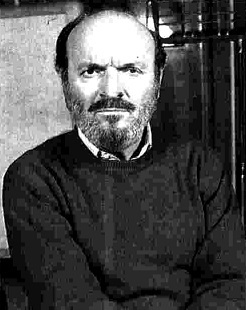
- Antonutti in 1994
- Born: 3 August 1935; Basiliano, Italy
- Died: 5 November 2019 (aged 84); Udine, Italy
- Occupations: Actor; voice actor
- Years active: 1966–2019

Omero Antonutti (3 August 1935 – 5 November 2019) was an Italian actor and voice actor.

== Biography ==
Born in Basiliano, in the province of Udine (in the Northeastern Italian region of Friuli-Venezia Giulia), after having worked in shipyards, Antonutti embraced the acting career, working mainly on stage, especially at the Teatro Stabile di Trieste and at the Teatro Stabile di Genova, in which he often worked under Luigi Squarzina. He made his film debut in the 1966 film Pleasant Nights starring Vittorio Gassman, Gina Lollobrigida and Ugo Tognazzi. His most notable performance was in the Taviani brothers' acclaimed film Padre Padrone. In Spain, he worked with Víctor Erice in El Sur, and Carlos Saura in El Dorado. He also played Noah in Genesis: The Creation and the Flood.

Antonutti was also regularly employed in the dubbing of foreign films into the Italian language. He was a regular Italian voice actor of Christopher Lee and dubbed him in many of his film roles, which include The Lord of the Rings film franchise, The Hobbit film franchise and Star Wars: Episode III – Revenge of the Sith. Other actors he dubbed included John Hurt, Omar Sharif, Michael Gambon, Christopher Plummer, Donald Sutherland, James Cromwell and Robert Duvall.

== Death ==
Antonutti died in Udine on 5 November 2019, at the age of 84, after suffering a long cancer-related illness.

== Filmography ==
=== Cinema ===
Year	Title	Role	Notes
1966	Pleasant Nights	Il Capitano	
1966	Black Market of Love	Lemaire	
1974	Kidnap	Bonsanti	
1974	Italy: Year One	Altro comunista	
1974	Processo per direttissima	Il commissario Messina	
1975	The Sunday Woman	Benito	
1977	Padre Padrone	Efisio Ledda	
1979	The Truth on the Savolta Affair	Savolta	
1980	Alexander the Great	Alexandros	
1981	The Homeless One	Alfredo Bossi	
1982	The Night of the Shooting Stars	Galvano Galvani	
1982	Grog	Enrico Manzi	
1983	Notturno	Schwabe	
1983	Basileus Quartet	Diego	
1983	El Sur	Agustín Arenas	
1983	The Deserter	Don Coi	
1984	Kaos	Luigi Pirandello	Segment: "Colloquio con la madre"
1985	Golfo de Vizcaya	Lucas	
1987	Good Morning, Babylon	Bonanno	
1987	Rumbo norte	Sam	
1988	The Witches' Sabbath	Medico condotto	
1988	El Dorado	Lope de Aguirre	
1989	Bankomatt	Ernesto Soldini	
1990	Doblones de a ocho	Ulpiano	
1990	Sandino	Don Gregorio Sandino	
1991	A Simple Story	Father Cricco	
1991	Solitud	Gaietà	
1992	The Fencing Master	Don Jaime Astarloa	
1992	Amor e Dedinhos de Pé	Padilla	
1992	A Passing Season	Antonio's father	
1993	The Greek Labyrinth	Bardón	
1994	Farinelli	Nicola Porpora	
1995	Un eroe borghese	Michele Sindona	
1995	Non ci sono più		
1996	The Border	Simeone	
1997	Bajo bandera	Padre Bruno	
1997	La traduzione		Short film
1997	La terza luna	Elio Sorani	
1998	You Laugh		
2000	Sulla spiaggia e di là dal molo	Barsanti	
2000	Tierra del Fuego		
2002	The Bankers of God: The Calvi Affair	Roberto Calvi	
2006	Napoleon and Me	Master Fontanelli	
2007	The Girl by the Lake	Mario's father	
2008	Miracle at St. Anna	Ludovico Salducci	
2010	Habibi		Short film
2012	Piazza Fontana: The Italian Conspiracy	Giuseppe Saragat	
2013	Welcome Mr. President	General Secretary Ranieri	
2015	Burning Love	Leonardo's grandfather	
2020	Hammamet	Craxi's father	Posthumous release

=== Television ===
Year	Title	Role	Notes
1969	Il drago		TV film
1970	Una delle ultime sere del carnevale	Sior Momolo	TV film
1973	ESP	Jaap Ensing	TV miniseries
1974	Carlo Gozzi	Francesco Bartoli	TV film
1978	Le mani sporche	Karsky	TV miniseries
1979	Vestire gli ignudi	Emilio Grotti	TV film
1980	Quaderno proibito	Michele Cossati	TV miniseries
1982	The Life of Verdi	Carlo Verdi	TV miniseries
1983	Dieci registi italiani, dieci racconti italiani	Il padre	1 episode (season 1, episode 7)
1984	Mio figlio non sa leggere	Ugo	TV miniseries
1985	Los pazos de Ulloa	Don Pedro	TV miniseries
1986	El rey y la reina	Rómulo	TV film
1991	Così è (se vi pare)	Signor Ponza	TV film
1993	König der letzten Tage	Bernhard Knipperdolling	TV miniseries
1994	Genesis: The Creation and the Flood	Noah	TV film
1996	Dopo la tempesta	Giacomo Renzi	TV film
1997	Fatima	Father Luís	TV film
1998	La casa bruciata	Ferreira Gomez	TV film
1999	Pepe Carvalho	Petar Grusin	1 episode (season 1, episode 8)
1999	Ombre	Vania Wolkoff	TV miniseries
1999	Cristallo di rocca - Una storia di Natale	Thomas	TV film
1999	El secreto de la porcelana		TV miniseries
2000	Come quando fuori piove	Ugo Jessich	TV miniseries
2000	Maria, figlia del suo figlio		TV film
2001	Senza confini	Prefetto Piazza	TV film
2001	Klaras Hochzeit	Enrico Sabatini	TV film
2004	The Homicide Squad	Malatesta	TV miniseries
2005	Sacco e Vanzetti	The Priest	TV film
2007	Il Pirata: Marco Pantani	Ridolfi	TV film
2008	Rebecca, la prima moglie	Andrew	TV miniseries

== Voice work ==
Year	Title	Role	Notes
1993	The Secret of the Old Woods	Vento Matteo	Voice-over
1997	Life Is Beautiful	Narrator	Voice-over
2001	The Profession of Arms	Narrator	Voice-over
2003	Remember Me, My Love	Narrator	Voice-over
2011	Tormenti - Film disegnato	Narrator	Voice-over

=== Dubbing ===
==== Films (Animation, Italian dub) ====
Year	Title	Role(s)	Ref
1987	The Man Who Planted Trees	Narrator	
2007	The Simpsons Movie	Russ Cargill	
2007	Noah's Ark	God	
2009	9	Number 1	
2012	Frankenweenie	Mr. Rzykruski	

==== Films (Live action, Italian dub) ====
Year	Title	Role(s)	Original actor	Ref
1982	That Night in Varennes	Nicolas Restif de la Bretonne	Jean-Louis Barrault	
1988	Another Woman	Marion Post's father	John Houseman	
1992	The Accompanist	Charles Brice	Richard Bohringer	
1993	Paris Trout	Paris Trout	Dennis Hopper	
1993	Wrestling Ernest Hemingway	Walter	Robert Duvall	
1995	Viva San Isidro	Pepe Gongora	Andrés Pardaye	
1996	City Hall	Paul Zapatti	Anthony Franciosa	
1997	The Education of Little Tree	Granpa	James Cromwell	
1998	Tale of the Mummy	Sir Richard Turkel	Christopher Lee	
1999	Sleepy Hollow	Burgomaster	Christopher Lee	
1999	The Straight Story	Alvin Straight	Richard Farnsworth	
1999	The Straight Story	Lyle Straight	Harry Dean Stanton	
2000	Space Cowboys	Bob Gerson	James Cromwell	
2000	Shiner	Frank Spedding	Martin Landau	
2000	My Dog Skip	Adult Willie	Harry Connick Jr.	
2001	The Knights of the Quest	Delfinello da Coverzano	F. Murray Abraham	
2001	Amélie	Narrator	André Dussollier	
2001	The Lord of the Rings: The Fellowship of the Ring	Saruman	Christopher Lee	
2002	The Lord of the Rings: The Two Towers	Saruman	Christopher Lee	
2003	The Lord of the Rings: The Return of the King	Saruman	Christopher Lee	
2003	Open Range	Bluebonnet "Boss" Spearman	Robert Duvall	
2003	Cold Mountain	Reverend Monroe	Donald Sutherland	
2003	Monsieur Ibrahim	Monsieur Ibrahim	Omar Sharif	
2004	Pontormo – Un amore eretico	Pontormo	Joe Mantegna	
2004	National Treasure	John Adams Gates	Christopher Plummer	
2004	Kill Bill: Volume 2	Esteban Vihaio	Michael Parks	
2005	Star Wars: Episode III – Revenge of the Sith	Count Dooku	Christopher Lee	
2005	V for Vendetta	Adam Sutler	John Hurt	
2006	Perfume: The Story of a Murderer	Narrator	John Hurt	
2006	Scary Movie 4	Narrator	James Earl Jones	
2007	The Diving Bell and the Butterfly	Mr. Bauby Sr.	Max von Sydow	
2007	3:10 to Yuma	Byron McElroy	Peter Fonda	
2007	Epic Movie	Narrator	Roscoe Lee Browne	
2007	One Hundred Nails	Monsignore	Michele Zattara	
2008	City of Ember	Sul	Martin Landau	
2008	Fool's Gold	Nigel Honeycutt	Donald Sutherland	
2008	10,000 BC	Narrator	Omar Sharif	
2008	Australia	Kipling Flynn	Jack Thompson	
2009	The White Ribbon	Narrator	Ernst Jacobi	
2010	The King's Speech	King George V	Michael Gambon	
2011	This Must Be the Place	Alois Lange	Heinz Lieven	
2011	Season of the Witch	Cardinal D'Ambroise	Christopher Lee	
2011	The Girl with the Dragon Tattoo	Henrik Vanger	Christopher Plummer	
2011	The Cardboard Village	Il Sacrestano	Rutger Hauer	
2012	Dark Shadows	Silas Clarney	Christopher Lee	
2012	The Hobbit: An Unexpected Journey	Saruman	Christopher Lee	
2012	Haute Cuisine	The President	Jean d'Ormesson	
2013	See You Tomorrow	Mario Palagonia	Burt Young	
2014	The Hobbit: The Battle of the Five Armies	Saruman	Christopher Lee	

==== Television (Live action, Italian dub) ====
Year	Title	Role(s)	Notes	Original actor	Ref
1999	RKO 281	William Randolph Hearst	TV film	James Cromwell	
2003	I ragazzi della via Pál	János Gál	TV miniseries	Mario Adorf	

==== Video games (Italian dub) ====
Year	Title	Role(s)	Ref
2004	The Lord of the Rings: The Battle for Middle-earth	Saruman	
2004	The Lord of the Rings: The Third Age	Saruman	
