= Resurrection (2001 film) =

2001 film by Paolo and Vittorio Taviani

- Directed by: Paolo and Vittorio Taviani
- Music by: Nicola Piovani
- Countries of origin: Italy; France
- Original language: Italian

Production
- Cinematography: Franco Di Giacomo
- Editor: Roberto Perpignani
- Running time: 180 minutes

Original release
- Release: 26 December 2001

Resurrection (Italian: Resurrezione) is a 2001 Italian-French-German co-production directed by Paolo and Vittorio Taviani.

It won the Golden St. George award at the 24th Moscow International Film Festival.

== Cast ==
- Stefania Rocca : Katioucha Maslova
- Timothy Peach : Dimitri Nekhlioudov
- Marie Bäumer : Missy
- Cécile Bois : Mariette
- Eva Christian : Agrafena
- Marina Vlady: Zia Duchessa
- Giulio Scarpati: Simonson
- Antonella Ponziani: Vera
