= 25th European Film Awards =

2012 film awards ceremony in Malta

The 25th European Film Awards
- Date: 1 December 2012
- Location: Valletta, Malta
- Presented by: European Film Academy

The 25th European Film Awards were presented on 1 December 2012 in Valletta, Malta. The winners were selected by over 2,500 members of the European Film Academy.

== Winners and nominees ==
=== Best Film ===
English title	Original title	Director(s)	Production country
Love	Amour	Michael Haneke	France, Austria, Germany
Caesar Must Die	Cesare deve morire	Paolo Taviani, Vittorio Taviani	Italy
The Intouchables	Intouchables	Éric Toledano and Olivier Nakache	France
Barbara		Christian Petzold	Germany
Shame		Steve McQueen	United Kingdom
The Hunt	Jagten	Thomas Vinterberg	Denmark

=== Best Animated Feature Film ===
The nominees for Best Animated Feature Film were selected by a committee consisting of EFA Board Members and representatives from the European Association of Animation Film.

English title	Original title	Director(s)	Production country
Alois Nebel		Tomáš Luňák	Czech Republic, Germany
The Pirates! in an Adventure with Scientists		Peter Lord	Great Britain, United States
Wrinkles	Arrugas	Ignacio Ferreras	Spain

=== European Film Award for Achievement in World Cinema ===
- Helen Mirren

== People's Choice Award ==
The winner of the People's Choice Award was selected by online votes.

English title	Original title	Director(s)	Production country
Come As You Are	Hasta la Vista	Geoffrey Enthoven	Belgium
The Artist		Michel Hazanavicius	France
Barbara		Christian Petzold	Germany
The Best Exotic Marigold Hotel		John Madden	Great Britain, United States
Caesar Must Die	Cesare deve morire	Paolo Taviani	Italy
Headhunters	Hodejegenre	Morten Tyldum	Norway
In Darkness	W ciemności	Agnieszka Holland	Germany, Poland, Canada
Untouchable	Intouchables	Éric Toledano and Olivier Nakache	France
The Iron Lady		Phyllida Lloyd	Great Britain
Salmon Fishing in the Yemen		Lasse Hallström	Great Britain
Shame		Steve McQueen	Great Britain
Tinker Tailor Soldier Spy		Tomas Alfredson	France, Great Britain, Germany
