= Maidens' Tower =

- Directed by: Susanna Lira
- Release date: 2018
- Running time: 97
- Country: Brazil
- Language: Brazilian Portuguese

Maidens' Tower (also translated as The Virgin's Tower and known as Torre das Donzelas in Brazilian Portuguese) is a 2018 Brazilian documentary film, lasting 97 minutes and directed by Susanna Lira, who defined the film as a call to resistance .

Maidens' Tower discusses and denounces the cruel and brutal experiences to which women prisoners were subjected during the period of the Brazilian Military Dictatorship (1964–1985), through the reports of several persecuted and imprisoned women, of which the former Brazilian president, Dilma Rousseff, stands out. In this film, women who are former political prisoners describe their daily lives: from cleaning their cells to the importance of reading in maintaining hope, the torture they suffered and how they were captured in their fight for democracy. The film recreated, based on the memoirs of former inmates, a scenario similar to the prison. The Tiradentes Prison, which housed the Maidens Tower (as part of the women's prison), was demolished in 1972

Maidens' Tower premiered on September 25, 2019, at Cine Metrópolis, at Ufes and was attended by Dilma Rousseff. After its theatrical debut, it had its television premiere on April 22, 2020, on Canal Brasil.

== Synopsis ==
The documentary revisits the story of women who suffered torture by and fought against the military regime and were imprisoned in the so-called Maidens' Tower, the name given to the group of women's cells in the Tiradentes Prison in São Paulo, demolished in 1972.

Director Susanna Lira was interested in this specific prison because powerful women, who have been important to Brazil's history, came out of it.

Based on drawings made by each of the interviewees with chalk on a board, the title creates a field of subjectivity by re-erecting a scenographic tower; this was inspired by Dogville (2003), by Lars von Trier. Other cinematographic references were Caesar Must Die (2012), by the Taviani Brothers, and The Missing Image (2013), a historical documentary by Rithy Panh about the dictatorship in Cambodia.

The filmmaker asked the interviewees to draw, according to their own memory, what the corridors and cells that housed them were like in the 1970s. Based on memories, the film recreated a scenario similar to the prison, with bars, beds, bathrooms and corridors inspired by the features of those who lived there. The former prisoners comment on the torture they suffered, tell how they were captured for their democratic activism, detail their daily lives, from cleaning the cells to the importance of reading in maintaining hope and taking a brief breather during each visit from a family member.

The set installation where the filming took place, which reconstitutes the prison space, was created under the art direction of Glauce Queiroz.

The documentary focuses on solidarity and integration between the prisoners, who come together in a kind of family, characteristics evident in the participants' testimonies.

The participants of Maidens' Tower, some of whom are now deceased, are: Rose Nogueira, Elza Lobo, Dilma Rousseff, Dulce Maia, Nair Benedicto, Leslie Beloque, Eva Teresa Skazufka, Robêni Baptista da Costa, Guida Amaral, Marlene Soccas, Maria Luiza Belloque, Nair Yumiko Kobashi, Ieda Akselrud Seixas, Lenira Machado, Ana Mércia, Ilda Martins da Silva, Iara Glória Areias Prado, Ana Maria Aratangy, Darci Miyaki, Vilma Barban, Telinha Pimenta, Sirlene Bendazzoli, Nadja Leite, Leane Ferreira de Almeida, Maria Aparecida dos Santos, Lucia Salvia Coelho and Janice Theodoro da Silva .

== Awards ==
- Special Jury Prize at the Brasília Festival in 2018
- Best Feature Documentary Award and Best Documentary Direction at the Rio de Janeiro Film Festival in 2018
- Best Documentary Award at the 12th ATLANTIDOC in 2018
- Petrobrás Film Award at the São Paulo International Film Festival in 2018
