= Taviani (surname) =

Taviani is an Italian surname. Notable people with the surname include:

- Giuliano Taviani (born 1969), Italian composer
- Lina Nerli Taviani (born 1937), Italian costume designer, and wife of film director Paolo Taviani
- Paolo Emilio Taviani (1912–2001), Italian political leader, economist and historian
- Paolo and Vittorio Taviani, collectively referred to as the Taviani brothers, Italian film directors and screenwriters
