= Leonora addio =

- Directed by: Paolo Taviani
- Screenplay by: Paolo Taviani
- Starring: Fabrizio Ferracane
- Cinematography: Simone Zampagni; Paolo Carnera
- Edited by: Roberto Perpignani
- Music by: Nicola Piovani
- Distributed by: 01 Distribution
- Release date: 2022

Leonora addio (lit. "Leonora, goodbye") is a 2022 Italian drama film written and directed by Paolo Taviani, at his only work following the death of his brother Vittorio in 2018 and his last film before his own death in 2024. It is an adaptation of the Luigi Pirandello's short story "Il chiodo" ("The nail").

The film was entered into the competition at the 72nd Berlin International Film Festival, in which it was awarded the FIPRESCI Award for Best Film.

== Cast ==
- Fabrizio Ferracane as the Agrigento Municipality Delegate
- Martina Catalfamo as Lietta Pirandello
- Nathalie Rapti Gomez as Donna Buona
- Claudio Bigagli as the Bishop
- Giulio Pampiglione as the Aircraft Commander
- Biagio Barone as Don Biagio
- Roberto Herlitzka as Luigi Pirandello (voice)
