= Margarita Lozano =

Spanish actress (1931–2022)

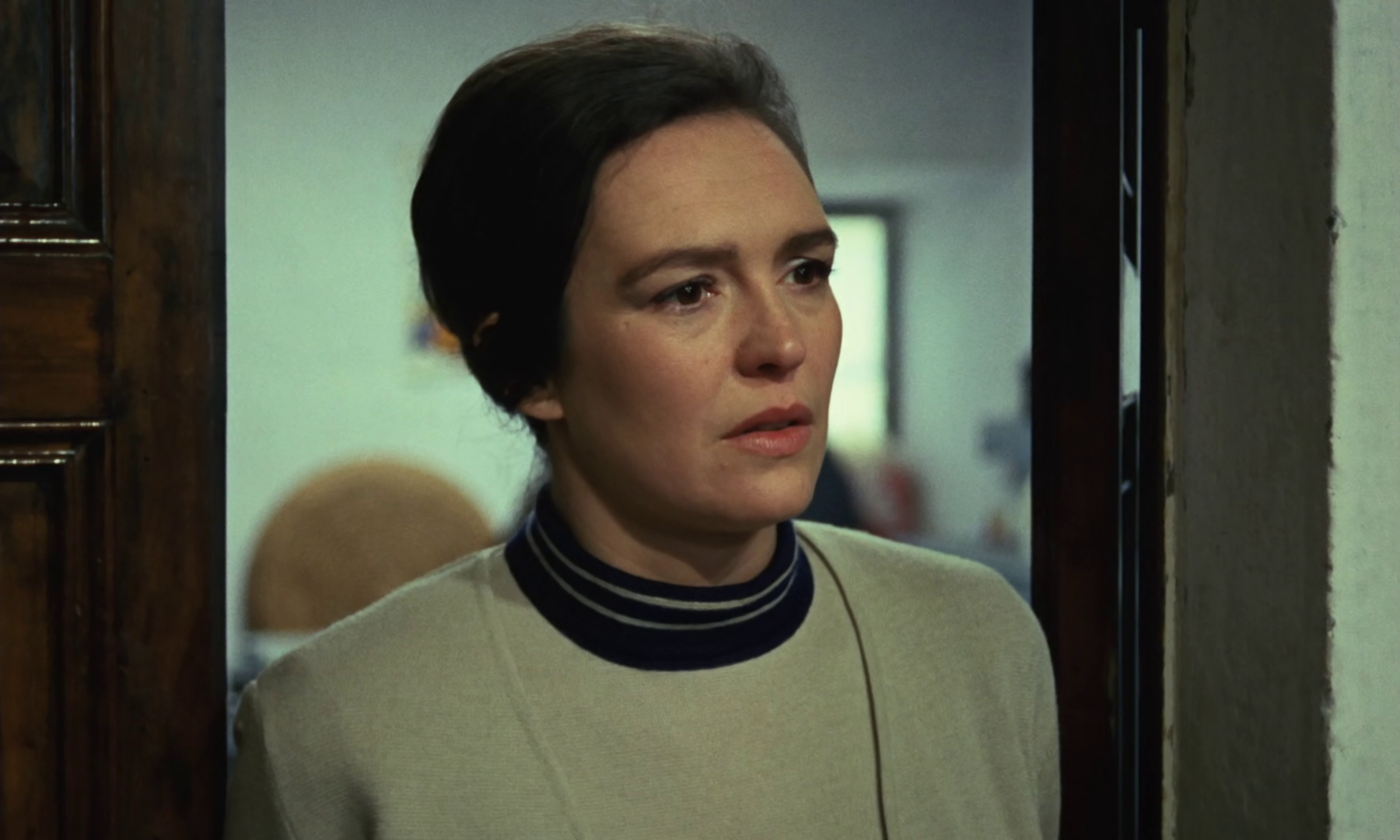
- Lozano in Sardinia Kidnapped (1968)
- Born: Margarita de las Flores Lozano Jiménez; 14 February 1931; Tetuan, Spanish protectorate in Morocco, Spain
- Died: 7 February 2022 (aged 90); Lorca, Spain
- Occupation: Actress
- Years active: 1953–2007

Margarita de las Flores Lozano Jiménez (14 February 1931 – 7 February 2022) was a Spanish actress known for her career in Italian films. She worked for Luis Buñuel in Viridiana, Sergio Leone in A Fistful of Dollars, Pier Paolo Pasolini in Pigsty, the Taviani brothers in The Night of the Shooting Stars, Kaos and Good Morning Babylon; Nanni Moretti in La messa è finita; and in Claude Berri's diptych Jean de Florette and Manon des Sources.

She worked with the theater director Miguel Narros in Fedra, by Miguel de Unamuno (1957); Three Sisters, by Anton Chekhov (1960); Fröken Julie, by August Strindberg (1961); La camisa, by Lauro Olmo (1962); El caballero de Olmedo, by Lope de Vega and La dama duende, by Pedro Calderón de la Barca.

She returned in 1988 with Miguel Narros in the plays Long Day's Journey into Night, by Eugene O'Neill, and La vita che ti diedi, by Luigi Pirandello. In 2007 she made her last appearance in the play La casa de Bernarda Alba, by Federico García Lorca, directed by Amelia Ochandiano.

== Biography ==
Margarita Lozano was born in Tetuán, at that time known as Spanish protectorate of Morocco. Lozano spent her childhood in Lorca (Murcia), where she later returned to establish her residence. She lived in multiple countries such as Germany, Madagascar, Italy, Senegal, and Africa. Lozano claimed that the only reason she left Africa was because her mother became ill and she had to care for her. Her mother would tell her that when she was about age four, Lozano would go behind curtains and say 'The actress is coming out' and in an interview she says that she was born an actress.

=== Theater and film ===
At age 19 Lozano moved to Madrid to study fashion and design. However; she later abandoned this field to become an actress. She quickly became Miguel Narros' preferred actress and starred in multiple plays that were considered risky at the time, such as Fedra, by Miguel de Unamuno (1957); Three Sisters, by Anton Chekhov (1960); Fröken Julie, by August Strindberg (1961); La camisa, by Lauro Olmo (1962); El caballero de Olmedo, by Lope de Vega and La dama duende, by Pedro Calderón de la Barca.

Lozano played secondary film roles for which she won the National Syndicate of the Show for best actress. She won for Viridiana (Luis Buñuel, 1961), in which she portrays Ramona, a maid who secretly drugs the protagonist and sets her up for rape. After 1963, Lozano reduced her activity in Spanish cinema and moved forward with producer Carlo Ponti in Italian cinema.

The film Night of The Shooting Stars by Paolo Taviani got 56 editions published between 1981 and 2016 in four languages, drawing inspiration from their experiences in Nazi-occupied Italy. Margarita Lozano was also part of the Clint Eastwood collection. She appeared in Taviani's Kaos, which tells the story of peasant families struggling to survive amid the pull of the new world.

=== Later life and death ===
Lozano resided in Bagnaia, Viterbo. She died in Lorca on 7 February 2022, at the age of 90, one week before her 91st birthday.

== Recognition ==
In May 2015 she was named Doctor honoris causa by the Universidad de Murcia.

Prizes include:

- Best actress National Syndicate of the Show in Un ángel tuvo la culpa (1960).
- Best Supporting Actress ACE (New York) in La mitad del cielo (1986).
- Medalla de Oro al Mérito en las Bellas Artes 2018, granted by the government of Spain.

== Filmography ==
- Younger Brother (1953)
- Manicomio (1954)
- High Fashion (1954) - Lina
- Rapsodia de sangre (1958) - Isabel
- Giovane canaglia (1958) - signorina Nicheli
- Diego Corrientes (1959)
- El Lazarillo de Tormes (1959) - Antona
- Un ángel tuvo la culpa (1960)
- Don Lucio y el hermano Pío (1960) - (uncredited)
- Viridiana (1961) - Ramona
- El hombre del expreso de Oriente (1962)
- Teresa de Jesús (1962)
- Los farsantes (1963) - Tina
- Noche de verano (1963) - Novia de Pedro
- El sol en el espejo (1963) - Engracia
- Los Tarantos (1963) - Isabel
- Un demonio con ángel (1963) - Sor Angustias
- Los felices sesenta (1963)
- El precio de un asesino (1963) - Beatriz Morales
- A Fistful of Dollars (1964) - Doña Consuelo Baxter
- Crimen (1964) - Doña Emilia
- Amador (1966) - (uncredited)
- Después del gran robo (1967)
- 15 Scaffolds for a Murderer (1967) - Mrs. Cook, the Widow
- Sardinia Kidnapped (1968) - Marras' mother
- Diary of a Schizophrenic Girl (1968) - Bianca
- The Lady of Monza (1969) - Sister Benedetta Homati
- That Splendid November (1969) - Amalia
- Pigsty (1969) - Madame Klotz
- Baltagul (1969) - Vitoria Lipan
- The President of Borgorosso Football Club (1970) - Erminia
- La vacanza (1971) - Ra
- Un día en la vida (1973)
- The Night of the Shooting Stars (1982) - Concetta
- Kaos (1984) - Mariagrazia (segment "L'altro figlio")
- The Mass Is Ended (1985) - Don Giulio's Mother
- Jean de Florette (1986) - Baptistine
- Half of Heaven (1986) - Abuela
- Manon des Sources (1986) - Baptistine
- The Moro Affair (1986) - Nora Moro
- Good Morning, Babylon (1987) - The Venetian
- Barbablù, Barbablù (1987) - Adele
- Burro (1989) - Madre di Burro
- The Sun Also Shines at Night (1990) - Sergio's Mother
- Mima (1991) - Grandma
- El infierno prometido (1992) - Remedios Luz
- Con gli occhi chiusi (1994)
- Nos miran (2002) - Luisa
- Octavia (2002) - Doña
- Napoleon and Me (2006) - Pascalina (final film role)
