= Fiorile =

- Italian-language poster
- Directed by: Paolo Taviani; Vittorio Taviani
- Written by: Sandro Petraglia; Paolo Taviani; Vittorio Taviani
- Produced by: Grazia Volpi
- Starring: Claudio Bigagli; Galatea Ranzi; Michael Vartan
- Cinematography: Giuseppe Lanci
- Edited by: Roberto Perpignani
- Music by: Nicola Piovani
- Distributed by: Fine Line Features (US)
- Release date: 19 May 1993
- Running time: 118 minutes
- Countries: Italy; France; Germany
- Languages: Italian; French

Fiorile is a 1993 Italian drama film about a family curse caused by greed. The film was directed by Paolo and Vittorio Taviani, and stars Claudio Bigagli, Galatea Ranzi, and Michael Vartan. It was entered into the 1993 Cannes Film Festival.

The title Fiorile allegedly is derived from the month of Floréal (April–May) in the French Republican Calendar. The film is also known as Wild Flower.

== Plot ==
While travelling to visit their grandfather in Tuscany, two children are told the story of a family curse that has lasted two hundred years. During Napoleon's Italian invasion, Elisabetta Benedetti fell in love with French soldier Jean but while he was distracted by her, Elisabetta's brother Corrado unintentionally stole the regiment's gold that Jean was guarding, causing Jean's death by firing squad and set the curse in train. The Benedettis become wealthy, corrupt and hated by their former friends, who rename them the Maledetti, the 'cursed' (Benedetti means 'blessed'). The children's grandfather Massimo Benedetti is the last man to be directly affected by the curse but will he pass it onto them?

== Cast ==
- Claudio Bigagli – Corrado / Alessandro
- Galatea Ranzi – Elisabette / Elisa
- Michael Vartan – Jean / Massimo
- Lino Capolicchio – Luigi
- Constanze Engelbrecht – Juliette
- Athina Cenci – Gina
- Giovanni Guidelli – Elio
- Norma Martelli – Livia
- Pier Paolo Capponi – Duilio
- Chiara Caselli – Chiara
- Renato Carpentieri – Massimo as an old Man
- Carlo Luca De Ruggieri – Renzo
- Laurent Schilling
- Fritz Müller-Scherz – University Professor
- Laura Scarimbolo – Alfredina

== See also ==
- List of Italian films of 1993
