= You Laugh =

1998 film

- Directed by: Paolo and Vittorio Taviani
- Produced by: Grazia Volpi
- Starring: Turi Ferro; Antonio Albanese; Lello Arena; Sabrina Ferilli
- Cinematography: Giuseppe Lanci
- Edited by: Roberto Perpignani
- Music by: Nicola Piovani
- Release date: 1998
- Country: Italy
- Language: Italian

Tu ridi (internationally released as You Laugh, Two Kidnappings and Kaos II) is a 1998 Italian drama film. It is the second film adaptation based on short stories by Luigi Pirandello after Kaos directed by Paolo and Vittorio Taviani.

For this film Taviani were awarded as best director at Mar del Plata Film Festival.

It represents the last film starred by Turi Ferro.

== Cast ==
=== Felice (Tu Ridi) ===
- Antonio Albanese: Felice Tespini
- Sabrina Ferilli: Nora
- Giuseppe Cederna: Tobia Rambaldi
- Elena Ghiaurov: Marika
- Luca Zingaretti: Gino Migliori

=== Two Kidnappings (Due sequestri) ===
- Lello Arena: Rocco
- Turi Ferro: Ballarò
