= The Witches' Sabbath =

- Directed by: Marco Bellocchio
- Written by: Marco Bellocchio; Francesca Pirani
- Produced by: Achille Manzotti; André Djaoui
- Cinematography: Giuseppe Lanci
- Edited by: Marco Bellocchio; Mirco Garrone
- Music by: Carlo Crivelli
- Distributed by: BAC Films
- Release date: 1988

The Witches' Sabbath (Italian: La visione del sabba, French: La sorcière, also known as The Sabbath) is a 1988 Italian-French drama film written and directed by Marco Bellocchio.

== Cast ==
- Béatrice Dalle: Maddalena
- Daniel Ezralow: Davide
- Corinne Touzet: Cristina
- Jacques Weber: Professor Cadò
- Omero Antonutti: Medico condotto
- Paolo De Vita: Monatto

== Production ==
Actress Raffaella Rossellini accused her colleague Daniel Ezralow of using violence, including carnal violence, on the set. The offending scene is the one in which the male protagonist tries to free himself and take possession of the "witch" Rossellini, embracing and slapping her, attracting and repelling her with force, finally dragging her into a pond. But finally Rossellini recanted by filing a simple labor lawsuit.
