= Claudio Bigagli =

Italian actor (born 1955)

- Born: 8 December 1955 (age 70); Montale, Tuscany, Italy
- Occupation: Actor
- Height: 1.78 m (5 ft 10 in)

Claudio Bigagli (born 8 December 1955) is an Italian actor. He has appeared in more than 40 films and television shows since 1976.

== Life and career ==
Born in Montale, Bigagli studied at the Silvio d’Amico Academy of Dramatic Arts, and made his debut in the Dario Fo's stage company. He made his film debut in Marco Leto's Al piacere di rivederla, and had his breakout in 1982 in The Night of the Shooting Stars by Taviani brothers, with whom he worked several times in the following years. Among the most requested Italian actors between 1980s and 1990s, he made his directorial debut in 1998 with Il guerriero Camillo. He is also active as a playwright.

== Selected filmography ==
- The Face with Two Left Feet (1979)
- The Night of the Shooting Stars (1982)
- Via degli specchi (1982)
- Tu mi turbi (1983)
- Kaos (1984)
- It's Happening Tomorrow (1988)
- Mediterraneo (1991)
- Gangsters (1992)
- Who Wants to Kill Sara? (1992)
- Bonus malus (1993)
- Fiorile (1993)
- Living It Up (1994)
- Who Killed Pasolini? (1995)
- Stella's Favor (1996)
- Unfair Competition (2001)
- Three Steps Over Heaven (2004)
- The Roses of the Desert (2006)
- Some Say No (2011)
- L'Universale (2016)
- The Name of the Rose (2019)
- The New Pope (2020)
