= The Sun Also Shines at Night =

1990 Italian film

- Film poster
- Directed by: Paolo and Vittorio Taviani
- Written by: Paolo and Vittorio Taviani; Tonino Guerra
- Based on: Father Sergius by Leo Tolstoy
- Produced by: Giuliani G. De Negri; Grazia Volpi
- Starring: Julian Sands
- Cinematography: Giuseppe Lanci
- Edited by: Roberto Perpignani
- Music by: Nicola Piovani
- Distributed by: BAC Films (France)
- Release date: 22 August 1990
- Running time: 112 minutes
- Countries: Italy; France; Germany
- Language: Italian

The Sun Also Shines at Night (Italian: Il sole anche di notte, and also known as Night Sun) is an Italian film directed by Paolo and Vittorio Taviani in 1990. It was screened out of competition at the 1990 Cannes Film Festival.

The plot is based on Leo Tolstoy's 1911 posthumously published short story "Father Sergius". The court of Czar Nicholas I of Russia is replaced by that of Charles III of Spain when he was still Charles VII of Naples. All of the original Russian locations are replaced by ones in southern Italy.

== Cast ==
- Julian Sands as Sergio Giuramondo
- Charlotte Gainsbourg as Matilda
- Massimo Bonetti as Prince Santobuono
- Margarita Lozano as Sergio's Mother
- Patricia Millardet as Aurelia
- Rüdiger Vogler as King Charles
- Nastassja Kinski as Cristina Del Carpio
- Pamela Villoresi as Giuseppina Giuramondo
- Geppy Geijeses as Bishop (as Geppy Gleijeses)
- Sonia Gessner as Duchess Del Carpio
- Tony Sperandeo as Gesuino (as Gaetano Sperandeo)
- Matilde Piana as Peasant Woman
- Vittorio Capotorto as Matilda's Father
- Riccardo Parisio Perrotti as Duke Del Carpio (as Riccardo Parrisio Perrotti)
- Salvatore Rossi (actor) as Eugenio
- Teresa Brescianini as Concetta
- Biagio Barone as Father Biagio
