= Pleasant Nights =

1966 film

- Film poster
- Directed by: Armando Crispino; Luciano Lucignani
- Written by: Sandro Continenza
- Produced by: Mario Cecchi Gori
- Starring: Vittorio Gassman
- Cinematography: Leonida Barboni; Erico Menczer; Gábor Pogány
- Edited by: Marcello Malvestito
- Music by: Gino Marinuzzi jr.
- Release date: 1966
- Running time: 117 minutes
- Country: Italy
- Language: Italian

Pleasant Nights (Italian: Le piacevoli notti) is a 1966 Italian anthology comedy film directed by Armando Crispino and Luciano Lucignani and starring Vittorio Gassman and Gina Lollobrigida.

== Premise ==
The film comprises three comedic tales set in the Middle Ages.

== Cast ==
- Vittorio Gassman - Bastiano da Sangallo
- Gina Lollobrigida - Domicilla
- Ugo Tognazzi - Uguccione
- Adolfo Celi - Bernadozzo
- Eros Pagni - Soldier
- Gigi Proietti - Mario di Colli
- Carmen Scarpitta
- Maria Grazia Buccella - Lucrezia Borgia
- Hélène Chanel
- Luigi Vannucchi
- Magda Konopka - Fiametta
- Omero Antonutti - Il Capitano
- Paolo Bonacelli
