= Gamma (miniseries) =

- Written by: Fabrizio Trecca; Flavio Nicolini
- Directed by: Salvatore Nocita
- Starring: Giulio Brogi
- Composer: Enrico Simonetti
- Country of origin: Italy
- No. of seasons: 1
- No. of episodes: 4

Production
- Running time: 240 min.

Original release
- Release: 21 October – 11 November 1975

Gamma is a 1975 Italian science fiction-drama television miniseries directed by Salvatore Nocita and starring Giulio Brogi. The story of a brain transplant on a young race car driver in Créteil and of its ethical implications, it was broadcast on Rai 1.

== Main cast ==
- Giulio Brogi as Jean Delafoy
- Laura Belli as Marianne Laforet
- Regina Bianchi as Daniel's Mother
- Ugo Cardea as Philippe
- Sergio Rossi as Professor Duvall
- Guido Tasso as Daniel Lucas
- Nicoletta Rizzi as Dr. Mayer
- Laura Bottigelli as The Child
- Maria Grazia Grassini as Madame Oreille
- Walter Maestosi as Levy-Marchand
- Marcello Mandò as President of the court
- Elio Zamuto as Attorney
- Gianfranco Bellini as Professor Aklund
