= Come Have Coffee with Us =

- Directed by: Alberto Lattuada
- Written by: Alberto Lattuada; Adriano Baracco; Tullio Kezich; Piero Chiara
- Starring: Ugo Tognazzi
- Cinematography: Lamberto Caimi
- Edited by: Sergio Montanari
- Music by: Fred Bongusto
- Release date: 1970
- Language: Italian

Venga a prendere il caffè da noi, internationally released as Come Have Coffee with Us, is a 1970 Italian comedy film directed by Alberto Lattuada. It is based on the novel La spartizione by Piero Chiara. The film was awarded with two Nastro d'Argento awards, for best screenplay and for best supporting actress (Francesca Romana Coluzzi).

== Cast ==
- Ugo Tognazzi: Emerenziano Paronzini
- Francesca Romana Coluzzi: Tarsilla Tettamanzi
- Milena Vukotic: Camilla Tettamanzi
- Angela Goodwin: Fortunata Tettamanzi
- Jean Jacques Fourgeaud: Paolino
- Valentine: Caterina, the maid
- Checco Rissone: Mansueto Tettamanzi
- Piero Chiara: Pozzi
- Alberto Lattuada: Raggi, the doctor

== See also ==
- List of Italian films of 1970
