= Saverio Marconi =

Italian actor and stage director

- Born: 1 April 1948 (age 76); Rome
- Occupation: actor

Saverio Marconi (born 1 April 1948) is an Italian stage director and actor.

== Life and career ==
Born in Rome, after his debut as a stage actor, Marconi had his breakout role in 1977 playing Gavino Ledda in the Paolo and Vittorio Taviani's drama film Padre Padrone. For his performance in that film he was nominated to a BAFTA Award and won the Nastro d'Argento for best new actor.

After some other significant roles in films directed by, among others, Gillo Pontecorvo, Luigi Comencini and Pasquale Squitieri, in the mid-eighties Marconi retired from acting to devote himself to a career of stage director, especially of Italian editions of famous American musicals.
