= Angela Goodwin =

Italian actress (1925–2016)

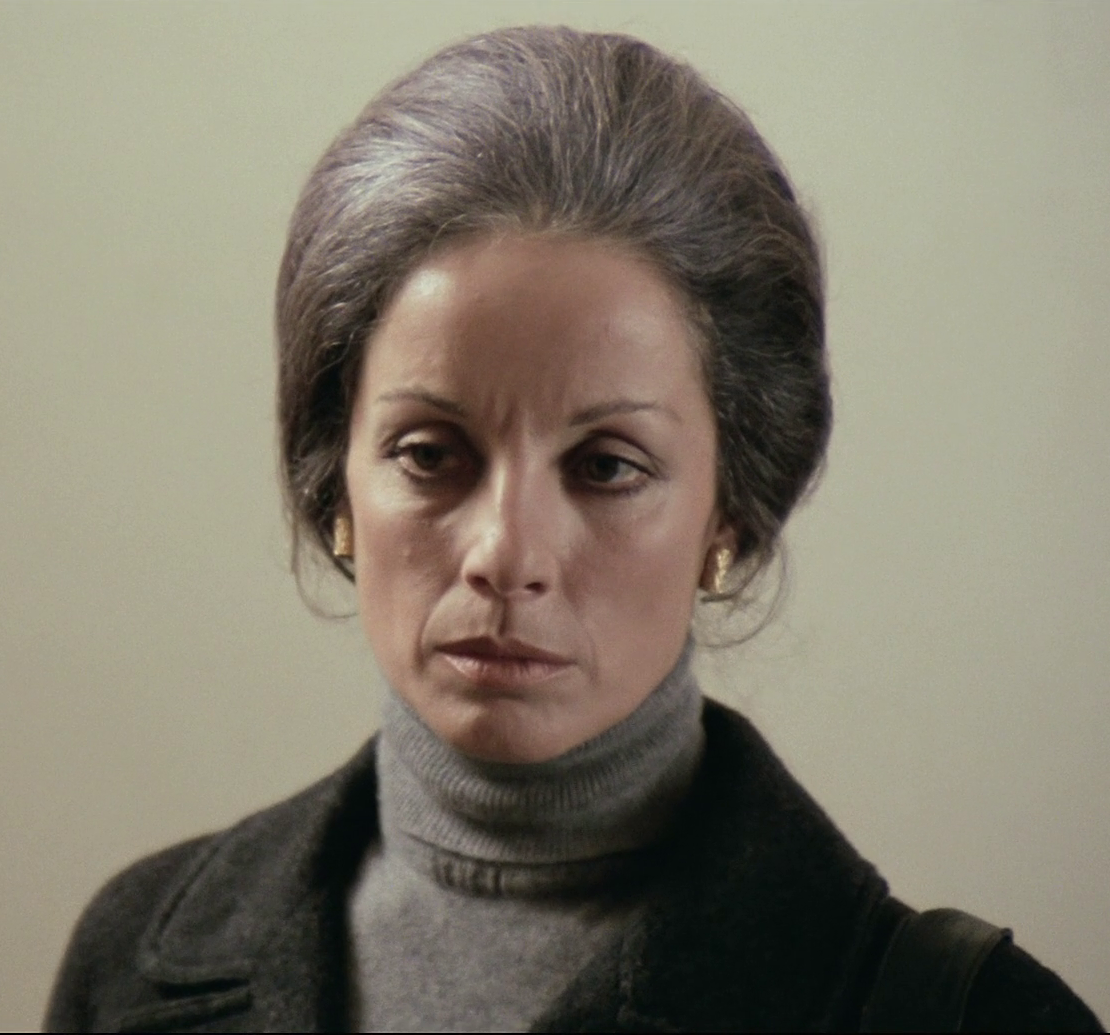
- Goodwin in the movie Amici miei (1975)
- Born: Angela Bucci; 1 August 1925; Rome, Kingdom of Italy
- Died: 25 March 2016 (aged 90); Rome, Italy
- Occupation: Actress
- Years active: 1970–2016
- Spouse: Franco Giacobini

Angela Goodwin (née Bucci; 1 August 1925 – 25 March 2016) was an Italian stage, film and television actress.

== Life and career ==
Goodwin was born in Rome, Italy, the daughter of an Italian-American father. She spent her youth in the US where she enrolled at several drama courses and started her professional career with a stage company in Washington, D.C. In the second half of the 1960s she came back to Italy, where she continued to work on stage with some of the major companies of the time, including the ones directed by Orazio Costa, Vittorio Gassman, Giancarlo Sbragia and Garinei & Giovannini.

In 1970, Goodwin had her film breakout as Fortunata, one of the Tettamanzi sisters in the Alberto Lattuada's commedia all'italiana Come Have Coffee with Us. Another major success in her career was the role of Laura Perozzi, Philippe Noiret's wife in Mario Monicelli's box office hit My Friends, a role she reprised in the 1982 sequel All My Friends Part 2. She was also very active on television. Her last work was the short film Carlo e Clara.

Goodwin was married to actor Franco Giacobini, with whom she often collaborated on stage.

== Filmography ==
Year	Title	Role	Notes
1970	Come Have Coffee with Us	Fortunata	
1970	Defeat of the Mafia	Vice Consul	
1972	La cosa buffa	The Landlady	
1973	Daniele e Maria		
1974	Abbasso tutti, viva noi	Marisa Nardi	
1974	L'albero dalle foglie rosa		
1974	Verginità	Concetta	(Segment 2)
1975	Autopsy	Danielle	
1975	My Friends	Nora Perozzi	
1975	Quanto è bello lu murire acciso	Enrichetta	
1976	La linea del fiume	Margherita Torretti	
1976	A Sold Life	Miguel Atienza's Mother	
1976	The Cassandra Crossing	Nun	
1977	The Passengers		
1978	Goodbye & Amen	The Ambassador's Wife	
1978	Last Feelings	Maria Micheli, Diego's mother	
1979	The Meadow	Giovannis mother	
1980	Eden no sono	Michele's Mother	
1982	All My Friends Part 2	Nora Perozzi	
1982	Di padre in figlio	Herself	
1983	Sing Sing	Lady Marian (first story)	
1984	Claretta	Luisa	
1984	Aurora	Nurse	TV movie
1985	Mai con le donne		
1985	Woman of Wonders	Maga Terenzi	
1987	Julia and Julia	Paolo's Mother	
1988	Ti presento un'amica		
1989	Modì	Eugenia	
1990	Alberto Express	La mère	
1990	Traces of an Amorous Life	Wife of Giorgio	
1992	La piovra, season 6	Mrs. Canevari	6 episodes
1995	Favola contaminata	Nonna	
2000	Denti	Ciuta	
2001	One Man Up	Franca	
2002	Ginostra	Mother Superior	
2004	The Consequences of Love	Isabella	
2007	The Hideout	Mother Superior	
2010	Hai paura del buio	Anna's Grandmother	
2010	Hayfever	Signora	
2012	Il volto di un'altra	Proprietaria di un negozio di animali impagliati	
