= Mario Masini =

Italian cinematographer and director (1939–2023)

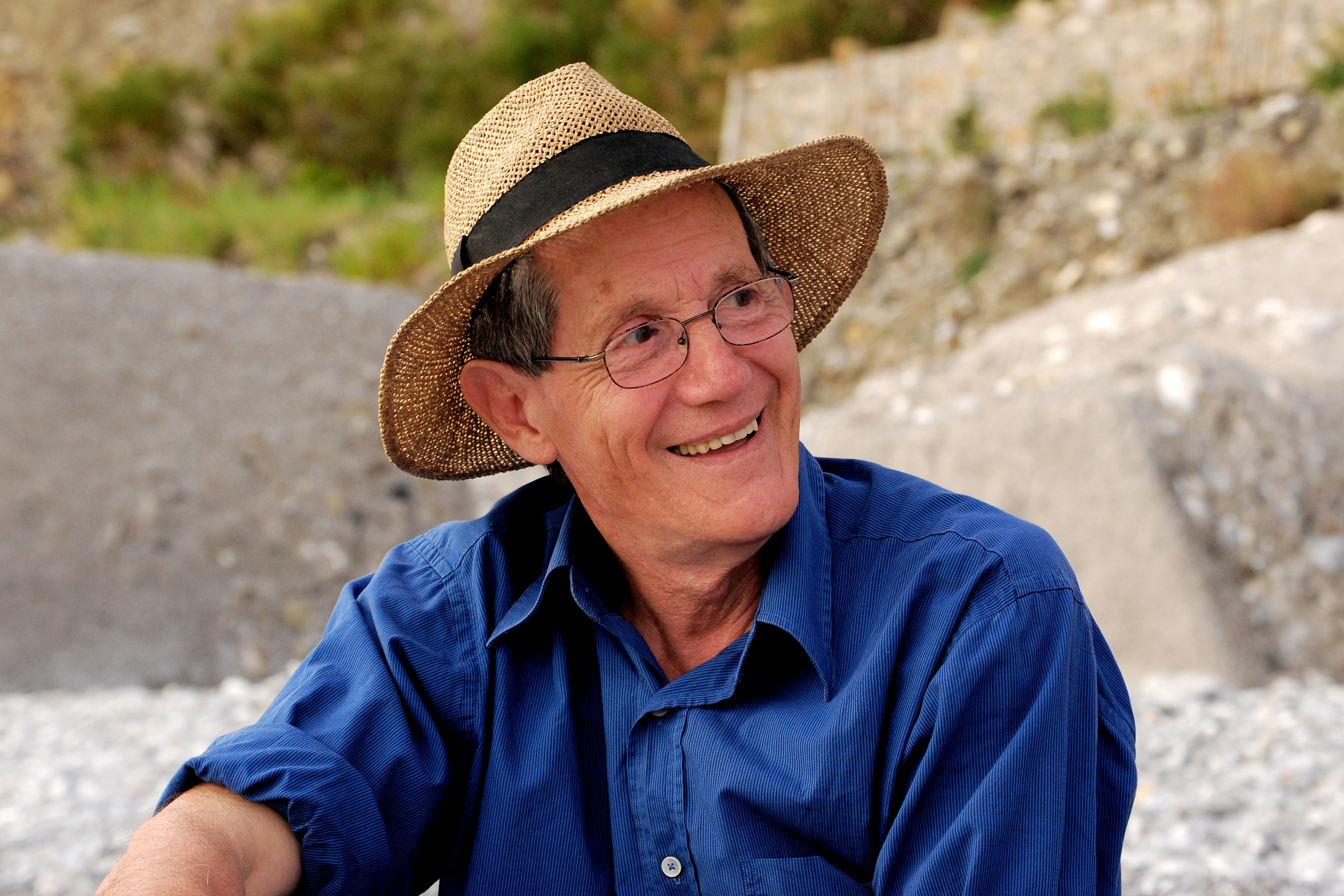
- Masini in 2009
- Born: 28 January 1939; Savona, Kingdom of Italy
- Died: 13 March 2023 (aged 84); Stuttgart, Germany

Mario Masini (28 January 1939 – 13 March 2023) was an Italian cinematographer and experimental director. He won the Palme d'Or at Cannes Film Festival with the film Padre Padrone in 1976.

== Life and career ==
Born in Savona, Masini grew up in Tuscany and in 1961 he graduated from the Centro Sperimentale di Cinematografia in Rome. He started his film career as assistant operator of Vittorio Storaro in Daniele D'Anza's Pugni, pupe e marinai. He is best known for his association with Carmelo Bene, with whom he collaborated as a cinematographer in all his films, including the Venice Film Festival Special Jury Prize winner Our Lady of the Turks; other notable collaborations include Paolo and Vittorio Taviani (notably being the cinematographer of Palme d'Or winner Padre Padrone), Bruno Bozzetto, Giuseppe Ferrara and Vittorio De Sisti. In the 1980s Masini retired from the industry to work as a teacher in some Steiner schools, and later moved to Stuttgart. He reprised his cinema activities in the early 1990s, working mainly in independent and arthouse international productions.

Masini was also a director of experimental and often surrealist films. He died on 13 March 2023, at the age of 84.
