= Allonsanfàn =

- Italian theatrical release poster
- Directed by: Paolo Taviani; Vittorio Taviani
- Written by: Paolo Taviani; Vittorio Taviani
- Produced by: Giuliani G. De Negri
- Starring: Marcello Mastroianni; Lea Massari; Mimsy Farmer; Laura Betti
- Cinematography: Giuseppe Ruzzolini
- Edited by: Roberto Perpignani
- Music by: Ennio Morricone
- Production company: Una Cooperativa Cinematografica
- Distributed by: Italnoleggio Cinematografico
- Release dates: 5 September 1974 (Milan); 6 September 1974 (Italy)
- Running time: 111 minutes
- Country: Italy
- Language: Italian
- Box office: L.415 million

Allonsanfàn (Italian pronunciation: [alˌlɔnzaɱˈfan]) is a 1974 Italian historical drama film written and directed by Paolo and Vittorio Taviani. The title of the film, which is also the name of a character, comes from the first words (French: Allons enfants, lit. 'Arise, children') of the French Revolutionary anthem La Marseillaise.

Set against the backdrop of the Italian Unification in early 19th-century Italy, it stars Marcello Mastroianni as an aging revolutionary who becomes disillusioned after the Restoration and tries to betray his companions, who are organizing an insurrection in Southern Italy.

== Plot ==
During the Restoration in 1816, middle-aged aristocrat Fulvio Imbriani, a Jacobin who served in the Italian campaigns of the French Revolutionary Wars, is released from prison after authorities spread the rumor that he sold out the Master of his secret society of revolutionaries —the Sublime Brothers— in exchange for freedom. Promptly abducted by the latter, Fulvio is put on trial until they find out that their missing Master committed suicide days earlier, disheartened by the seemingly-final defeat of revolutionary ideals. The Brothers disband, with Fulvio returning in disguise to his family villa for the first time in decades. After witnessing his relatives mourn his ostensible death, however, he reveals himself and is welcomed back.

Soon, he's joined by his lover and fellow revolutionary Charlotte, learning that she raised enough money abroad to fund an expedition to liberate the Kingdom of the Two Sicilies, currently weakened by cholera. Fulvio, though, has grown weary of their seemingly endless and unfruitful political struggle, re-evaluating the eases of aristocratic life. He unsuccessfully offers Charlotte to go to America with their child Massimiliano, who until then had been raised by peasants to keep him safe. Fulvio's sister finds out that the reunited Brothers will come to the villa to organize the expedition and reports them to the authorities. When Fulvio learns that Austrian soldiers are about to ambush his companions, he sees the opportunity to get out of his commitment and doesn't warn them: most Brothers are killed in the ensuing skirmish, while Fulvio flees with a fatally wounded Charlotte.

The surviving Brothers —oblivious to his betrayal— track him down at her funeral, followed by the Master's young son, Allonsanfàn. Learning that the expedition is still going, Fulvio offers to buy himself the needed guns with Charlotte's money, with which he actually plans to escape to America along with a newly reunited Massimiliano, but first he has to get rid of Brothers Lionello and her partner Francesca. He goes boating with the former in Lake Orta, where he claims smugglers will deliver the guns: Fulvio pretends to have been scammed and unsuccessfully tries to manipulate the suicidal Lionello into killing himself to avoid facing failure, but he dies anyway when the boat capsizes during the argument. Fulvio seduces Francesca to avoid being denounced to the Brothers and, after placing Massimiliano in a boarding school and using the money to pay years of rent in the case of his death, self-injures to simulate a robbery.

Fulvio and Francesca arrive in Genoa, where the expedition should set off. Here, the Brothers are moved by the story of Southern exile Vanni, who tells them how Two Sicilies soldiers buried alive his wife due to cholera, to the point of sailing for Sicily before the lack of guns can be revealed: while Fulvio is unconscious from an opium medicine for his injury, Francesca has him boarded with the others, much to his despair. After the Brothers decide to proceed with the expedition even without guns, an increasingly frantic Fulvio finds out that Vanni is infamous in Sicily for exacting revenge on many soldiers and fellow countrymen. As soon as they land, Fulvio once again betrays his fellow revolutionaries, reporting them to a priest in the nearby village of Grottole in exchange for his life. Fearing that the hungry and cholera-stricken peasants would easily join the rebellion, the priest stirs up them against the invaders, scapegoating them for the epidemic and highlighting Vanni's involvement. Easily recognizable because of their red shirts, the unsuspecting Brothers and Vanni are all lynched on the spot by the crowd.

Fulvio is leaving Grottole when he meets Allonsanfàn, the sole survivor of the massacre. Unable to accept the outcome of the expedition, he raves about a utopian brotherhood established at first sight between peasants and revolutionaries. Fulvio is dismissive, but, after hearing Grottole's bells ringing, he believes the Brothers succeeded and wears the red shirt that Allonsanfàn left behind to join them, thus being noticed and shot dead by newly arrived soldiers.

== Cast ==
- Marcello Mastroianni as Fulvio Imbriani
- Lea Massari as Charlotte
- Mimsy Farmer as Francesca
- Laura Betti as Esther Imbriani
- Claudio Cassinelli as Lionello
- Benjamin Lev as Vanni 'Peste' Gavina
- Renato De Carmine as Costantino Imbriani
- Stanko Molnar as Allonsanfàn
- Luisa De Santis as Fiorella Imbriani
- Biagio Pelligra as Grottole's Priest
- Michael Berger as Remigio Imbriani
- Raul Cabrera as Sublime Brother
- Alderice Casali as Concetta
- Cirylle Spiga as Massimo
- Ermanno Taviani as Massimiliano Imbriani

== Production ==
The Taviani brothers wrote the screenplay for the film, originally titled Terza dimensione (lit. 'Third Dimension'), while listening to 19th-century Italian operas such as Lucia di Lammermoor by Gaetano Donizetti and Giuseppe Verdi's Macbeth. It has been noted that the events of the film mirror the ill-fated 1857 revolutionary expedition led by Carlo Pisacane, while the surname of the main character is an homage to the Italian author of the period Vittorio Imbriani. The first version of the screenplay ended with Fulvio choosing not to betray his companions, surviving and coming back to bury them; the change was caused by the Tavianis' disillusionment with the outcome of May 1968.

The directors originally planned to shoot the film in 1965 with Gian Maria Volonté in the main role. Following St. Michael Had a Rooster (1972), the film ended up being produced by a cooperative financed by the State-owned company Italnoleggio Cinematografico. Mastroianni accepted the role of Fulvio since he perceived it as "the typical antihero character I enjoy playing" and wanted to return to work in Italy after shooting A Slightly Pregnant Man (1973) in Paris.

=== Filming ===
Principal photography took place between October and December 1973. Among the locations were Matera, Basilicata, and the Altopiano delle Murge in Apulia, at Pulo di Altamura and Castel del Monte. Scenes set at the Imbriani's family villa were shot at Villa Amalia in Erba, Lombardy. Both the opening scene and the violin scene between Fulvio and his son were shot in Brescia, at the Broletto and Teatro Grande. The scene where the Sublime Brothers kidnap Fulvio was shot in Bergamo, between Piazza Vecchia and Palazzo della Ragione.

Singer and songwriter Lucio Dalla was set to play Tito and some scenes were shot with him in the role, but was hospitalized during filming and had to be replaced by Bruno Cirino.

=== Soundtrack ===
The score was composed by Ennio Morricone and directed by Bruno Nicolai, with chorus by Alessandro Alessandroni's I Cantori Moderni and solo violin by Giorgio Mönch. Tavianis' previous composer Giovanni Fusco introduced Morricone to the directors, who originally didn't want to use any original music for the film. A soundtrack album was released in Italy by RCA Italiana.

No.	Title	Length
1.	"Rabbia e tarantella"	3:53
2.	"Ritorno a casa"	2:56
3.	"Dirindindin"	2:12
4.	"Frammenti di sonata"	3:04
5.	"Tradimento"	2:36
6.	"Te Deum laudamus"	6:48
7.	"Allonsanfàn (Sul lago)"	1:38
8.	"Allonsanfàn (Ballata)"	1:40
9.	"Rabbia e tarantella (2)"	1:06
10.	"Te Deum laudamus (2)"	2:11
11.	"Allonsanfàn (Fantasmi)"	2:12
12.	"Dirindindin (2)"	0:58
13.	"Frammenti di sonata (2)"	1:47
14.	"Ritorno a casa (2)"	1:06
15.	"Rabbia e tarantella (3)"	2:58

"Rabbia e tarantella", the main theme of the film, was used during the closing credits of Quentin Tarantino's Inglourious Basterds (2009).

== Release ==
Allonsanfàn premiered at the Cinema Arcadia in Milan on 5 September 1974, before being theatrically released the following day by Italnoleggio Cinematografico. It was subsequently screened at various international film festivals, including the Directors' Fortnight of the 1975 Cannes Film Festival, the Moscow International Film Festival, the BFI London Film Festival and the Chicago International Film Festival.

It was released in the United Kingdom in 1978 and in the United States by Italtoons Corporation on 1 March 1985.

=== Accolades ===
Award	Date of ceremony	Category	Recipient(s)	Result	Ref.
Chicago International Film Festival	1975	Gold Hugo	Allonsanfàn	Nominated	
Grolla d'Oro Awards	4 July 1975	Best Director	Paolo and Vittorio Taviani	Nominated	
Grolla d'Oro Awards	4 July 1975	Best Actor	Marcello Mastroianni	Nominated	
Nastro d'Argento Awards	1975	Best Actress	Lea Massari	Nominated	
Nastro d'Argento Awards	1975	Best Original Story	Paolo and Vittorio Taviani	Nominated	
