= Young Distance =

- Directed by: Vito Zagarrio
- Written by: Vito Zagarrio; Emanuela Martini; Lucio Mandarà
- Produced by: Grazia Volpi
- Starring: Greta Scacchi
- Cinematography: Roger Deakins
- Edited by: Roberto Perpignani
- Music by: Franco Piersanti
- Release date: 1988
- Country: Italy
- Language: Italian

Young Distance (Italian: La Donna della Luna, also known as Woman in the Moon, The Moon Woman and The Night of the Full Moon) is a 1988 Italian romantic drama film written and directed by Vito Zagarrio. It was produced by Rete Italia with a budget of about a billion lire.

== Plot ==
Angela, an Italian-American woman, after many years returned to Sicily to attend the funeral of her father. During the ferry trip she knows Salvo, a teenager who claims to be hunted by the Mafia, because of a quantity of drugs he stole to some criminals. Angela decides to give him a ride and the two embark on a journey through Sicily.

== Cast ==
- Greta Scacchi as Angela
- Luca Orlandini as Salvo
- Tim Finn as Steve
- Mike Magistro as Toti Mazza
- Marcello Perracchio as Joe Lacagnina
