= Giulio Brogi =

Italian actor (1935–2019)

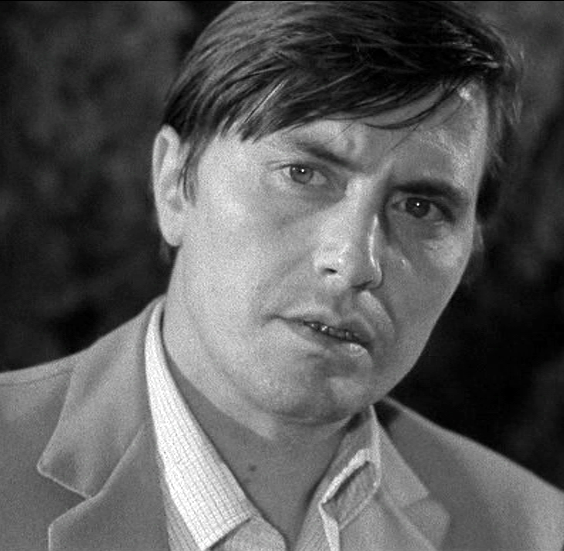
- Born: 3 May 1935; Verona, Veneto, Italy
- Died: 19 February 2019 (aged 83); Negrar, Italy
- Occupation: Actor
- Years active: 1967–2019

Giulio Brogi (3 May 1935 – 19 February 2019) was an Italian actor. He appeared in 39 films and television shows beginning in 1967. He starred in the 1974 film Morel's Invention, which also starred Anna Karina.

== Selected filmography ==
- The Subversives (1967)
- Galileo (1968)
- Days of Fire (1968)
- Under the Sign of Scorpio (1969)
- The Seven Headed Lion (1970)
- The Spider's Stratagem (1970)
- Eneide (1971)
- St. Michael Had a Rooster (1972)
- Morel's Invention (1974)
- Gamma (1975)
- Quanto è bello lu murire acciso (1976)
- Il gabbiano (1977)
- The Meadow (1979)
- Voyage to Cythera (1984)
- The Yes Man (1991)
- The Secret of the Old Woods (1993)
- Holy Tongue (2000)
