= The Elective Affinities =

1996 film

- Film poster
- Directed by: Paolo and Vittorio Taviani
- Written by: Paolo and Vittorio Taviani; Johann Wolfgang Goethe
- Produced by: Jean-Claude Cecile; Grazia Volpi
- Starring: Isabelle Huppert
- Cinematography: Giuseppe Lanci
- Edited by: Roberto Perpignani
- Release date: 14 November 1996
- Running time: 98 minutes
- Countries: Italy; France
- Language: Italian
- Box office: $220,000

The Elective Affinities (Italian: Le affinità elettive, French: Les affinités électives) is a 1996 Italian-French comedy film directed by Paolo and Vittorio Taviani. It was screened out of competition at the 1996 Cannes Film Festival.

== Cast ==
- Isabelle Huppert as Carlotta
- Fabrizio Bentivoglio as Ottone
- Jean-Hugues Anglade as Edoardo
- Marie Gillain as Ottilia
- Massimo Popolizio as Marchese
- Laura Marinoni as Marchesa
- Consuelo Ciatti as Governante
- Stefania Fuggetta as Agostina
- Gavino Bondioli as Guardiacaccia
- Massimo Grigo as Cameriere
- Adelaide Foti as Albergatrice
- Giancarlo Carboni as Medico
- Giancarlo Giannini as Narrator (voice)

== See also ==
- Isabelle Huppert on screen and stage
