= Good Morning, Babylon =

- Italian theatrical poster
- Directed by: Paolo Taviani; Vittorio Taviani
- Screenplay by: Paolo Taviani; Vittorio Taviani; Tonino Guerra
- Story by: Paolo Taviani; Vittorio Taviani; Lloyd Fonvielle
- Produced by: Giuliani G. De Negri
- Starring: Vincent Spano; Joaquim de Almeida; Greta Scacchi; Désirée Becker; Omero Antonutti; Charles Dance
- Cinematography: Giuseppe Lanci
- Edited by: Roberto Perpignani
- Music by: Nicola Piovani
- Release dates: 13 May 1987 (France); 15 July 1987 (USA); 17 September 1987 (Italy)
- Running time: 117 minutes
- Countries: Italy; France
- Languages: English; French; Italian

Good Morning, Babylon (Italian: Buongiorno Babilonia) is a 1987 drama film written and directed by Paolo and Vittorio Taviani, starring Vincent Spano, Joaquim de Almeida, Greta Scacchi, Désirée Nosbusch, Omero Antonutti, and Charles Dance. The film follows the story of two Italian brothers who emigrate to America and find work as set designers for D.W. Griffith's silent film epic Intolerance (1916).

The French-Italian co-production was screened out of competition at the 1987 Cannes Film Festival. It was a critical and financial hit in its native country, winning a Nastro d'Argento for Best Costume Design with an additional nomination for Best Supporting Actor.

== Plot ==
Two Tuscan brothers, Nicola and Andrea Bonanno, come from a long line of artisans and church restorers. In 1911, they find themselves out of work without any real prospects. Hoping to find their fortunes elsewhere, they emigrate to the United States. Initially forced into precarious jobs, the two young man manage to find work in the Italian emigrant neighborhood of San Francisco.

Thanks to their talent and with a bit of luck, they find themselves in the employ of film director D. W. Griffith, who is overseeing preproduction of his historical epic Intolerance and is looking for Italian-born set designers. The brothers find themselves working on the film's elaborate Babylonian period setpieces, while falling in love with two young extras; Edna and Mabel, whom they eventually marry.

Life, however, soon turns bitter for the brothers after Edna dies in childbirth. Rather than uniting the brothers, the tragedy only divides them. Later on in World War I, Nicola and Andrea will meet and the camera, used by the army for military purposes, will be the dramatic witness of the epilogue of their lives.

== Cast ==
- Vincent Spano as Nicola Bonanno
- Joaquim de Almeida as Andrea Bonanno
- Greta Scacchi as Edna Bonanno
- Désirée Nosbusch as Mabel Bonanno
- Omero Antonutti as Bonanno "Babbo"
- Bérangère Bonvoisin as Mrs. Griffith
- David Brandon as Mr. Grass, Griffith's Production Manager
- Brian Freilino as Mr. Thompson, Griffith's Assistant
- Charles Dance as D. W. Griffith
- Margarita Lozano as The Venetian
- Massimo Venturiello as Duccio Bonanno
- Andrea Prodan as Billy Bitzer
