= The Subversives =

1967 Italian film

The Subversives I sovversivi
- Directed by: Paolo and Vittorio Taviani
- Written by: Paolo and Vittorio Taviani
- Cinematography: Gianni Narzisi; Giuseppe Ruzzolini
- Edited by: Franco Brogi Taviani
- Music by: Giovanni Fusco
- Release date: 1967
- Country: Italy
- Language: Italian

I sovversivi (internationally released as The Subversives) is a 1967 Italian drama film. It is the first solo film directed by Paolo and Vittorio Taviani, without Valentino Orsini.

It was entered into the 32° Venice Film Festival.

== Plot ==
The film combines actual footage of Communist leader Palmiro Togliatti's funeral with the intermingled stories of four people affected by his death: Ettore, a Venezuelan radical who abandons the wealthy Italian woman he loves to go back to his country and help his cause; Ludovico, an ailing filmmaker who finds out that art alone is not enough; Giulia, a woman who embarks upon a lesbian affair with a former mistress of her husband; and Ermanno, a philosophy graduate who breaks up with his past.

== Cast ==
- Giulio Brogi: Ettore
- Pier Paolo Capponi: Muzio
- Lucio Dalla: Ermanno
- Fabienne Fabre: Giovanna
- Ferruccio De Ceresa: Ludovico
- Maria Cumani Quasimodo: Ludovico's mother
- José Torres: Rafael
- Feodor Chaliapin
- Vittorio Duse
