= The Meadow (film) =

- Directed by: Paolo and Vittorio Taviani
- Written by: Gianni Sbarra; Paolo and Vittorio Taviani
- Produced by: Giuliani G. De Negri
- Starring: Michele Placido; Saverio Marconi; Isabella Rossellini
- Cinematography: Franco Di Giacomo
- Edited by: Roberto Perpignani
- Music by: Ennio Morricone
- Release date: 1979
- Country: Italy
- Language: Italian

Il prato (internationally released as The Meadow) is a 1979 Italian drama film directed by Paolo and Vittorio Taviani. It was screened at the Venice Film Festival. For this film Isabella Rossellini was awarded with a Silver Ribbon for Best New Actress.

== Cast ==
- Michele Placido as Enzo
- Saverio Marconi as Giovanni
- Isabella Rossellini as Eugenia
- Giulio Brogi as Sergio
- Angela Goodwin as Giovanni's Mother

== See also ==
- List of Italian films of 1979
