= Under the Sign of Scorpio =

Under the Sign of Scorpio Sotto il segno dello scorpione
- Directed by: Paolo and Vittorio Taviani
- Written by: Paolo and Vittorio Taviani
- Produced by: Giuliani G. De Negri
- Starring: Gian Maria Volonté; Lucia Bosè
- Cinematography: Giuseppe Pinori
- Edited by: Roberto Perpignani
- Music by: Vittorio Gelmetti
- Release date: 1969
- Country: Italy
- Language: Italian

Under the Sign of Scorpio (Italian: Sotto il segno dello scorpione) is a 1969 Italian drama film written and directed by Paolo and Vittorio Taviani. It was screened at the Venice Film Festival.

The film was described as "perhaps the Tavianis' most advanced film in terms of creative originality and stylistic research".

== Cast ==
- Gian Maria Volonté: Renno
- Lucia Bosè: Glaia
- Giulio Brogi: Rutolo
- Samy Pavel: Taleno
- Renato Scarpa
- Alessandro Haber
