= Padre Padrone =

1977 Italian drama film directed by Paolo and Vittorio Taviani

- Theatrical release poster
- Directed by: Paolo Taviani; Vittorio Taviani
- Written by: Story: Gavino Ledda; Screenplay: Paolo Taviani; Vittorio Taviani
- Produced by: Giuliani G. De Negri
- Starring: Omero Antonutti
- Cinematography: Mario Masini
- Edited by: Roberto Perpignani
- Music by: Egisto Macchi
- Distributed by: Radiotelevisione Italiana; Cinema 5 Distributing (USA); Artificial Eye (UK)
- Release dates: June 1977 (Berlinale); December 23, 1977 (New York)
- Running time: 114 minutes
- Country: Italy
- Languages: Italian; Sardinian; Latin

Padre Padrone is a 1977 Italian film directed by Paolo Taviani and Vittorio Taviani. The Tavianis used both professional and non-professional actors from the Sardinian countryside. The title (pronounced [ˈpaːdre pa'drone]) literally means "Father Master"; it has been translated as My Father, My Master or Father and Master.

The drama was originally filmed by the Taviani brothers for Italian television but won the 1977 Palme d'Or prize at the 1977 Cannes Film Festival.

The film depicts a Sardinian shepherd who is terrorized by his domineering father and tries to escape by educating himself. He eventually becomes a celebrated linguist. The drama is based on an autobiographical book of the same title by Gavino Ledda.

In 2008, the film was included on the Italian Ministry of Cultural Heritage’s 100 Italian films to be saved, a list of 100 films that "have changed the collective memory of the country between 1942 and 1978."

== Plot ==
The film opens in a documentary style at the elementary school in Siligo, where six-year-old Gavino (Saverio Marconi) is attending. His tyrannical peasant father (Omero Antonutti) barges in and announces to the teacher and the students that Gavino must leave school and tend to the family sheep. Under his father's watchful eyes and the victim of his sadistic behavior, Gavino spends the next fourteen years tending sheep in the Sardinian mountains. There, he begins to discover "things" for himself and rebels against his father.

Gavino is rescued from his family and isolation when he is called for military service. During his time with the army, he learns about electronics, the Italian language, and classical music, yearning all the while for a university education.

When Gavino returns home, he declares to his father that he will attend university. His father is against this and tells him that he will throw him out of the family home. They have a nasty fight, but Gavino eventually attends university and emerges as a brilliant student. He becomes a linguist, specializing in the origins of the Sardinian language.

The film ends again in a documentary style as Gavino Ledda himself explains why he wrote his book and what Sardinian children may expect as inhabitants of a rural area with close ties to the land.

== Cast ==
- Omero Antonutti as Efisio
- Saverio Marconi as Gavino
- Marcella Michelangeli as Mother
- Fabrizio Forte as Young Gavino
- Nanni Moretti as Cesare
- Gavino Ledda as Himself

== Music ==
- Johann Strauss II: Overture from Die Fledermaus (accordion/radio scene)
- Wolfgang Amadeus Mozart: Clarinet Concerto
- Trink, trink, Brüderlein trink (German Volksmusik)

== Critical reception ==
Janet Maslin, film critic for The New York Times, praised the film and wrote, "Padre Padrone is stirringly affirmative. It's also a bit simple: The patriarchal behavior of Gavino's father is so readily accepted as an unfathomable given constant that the film never offers much insight into the man or the culture that fostered him. Intriguingly aberrant behavior is chalked up to tradition, and thus robbed of some of its ferocity. But the film is vivid and very moving, coarse but seldom blunt, and filled with raw landscapes that underscore the naturalness and inevitability of the father-son rituals it depicts."

Variety magazine wrote, "Around the initiation of a seven-year-old boy into the lonely life of sheep herder until his triumphant rift at the age of 20 with a remarkably overbearing father-patriarch (Omero Antonutti), the Taviani brothers have for the most part succeeded in adapting a miniature epic...In a long final part, accenting the boy's iron will to learn right up to a high school diploma, the final showdown between patriarch and rebel son is perhaps a more consequent narrative."

On review aggregator website Rotten Tomatoes, the film has an approval rating of 100% based on 6 reviews with an average score of 7.3/10.

== Awards ==
Wins

- Berlin International Film Festival: Interfilm Grand Prix, Paolo Taviani, Vittorio Taviani; 1977.
- Cannes Film Festival: FIPRESCI Prize Competition, Paolo Taviani and Vittorio Taviani; Golden Palm, Paolo Taviani and Vittorio Taviani; 1977.
- David di Donatello Awards, Italy: Special David, Paolo Taviani and Vittorio Taviani; 1978.
- Nastro d'Argento Best Director (Regista del Miglior Film Italiano), Vittorio Taviani and Paolo Taviani; Best New Actor (Migliore Attore Esordiente), Saverio Marconi; 1978.

Nominations

- British Academy of Film and Television Arts: BAFTA Film Award, Best Newcomer, Saverio Marconi; 1978.
