= The Lark Farm =

2007 Italian film

- La masseria delle allodole
- Directed by: Paolo and Vittorio Taviani
- Screenplay by: Antonia Arslan
- Starring: Paz Vega; Moritz Bleibtreu; Alessandro Preziosi
- Cinematography: Giuseppe Lanci
- Edited by: Roberto Perpignani
- Music by: Giuliano Taviani
- Release date: 4 May 2007 (Berlin International Film Festival)
- Running time: 122 minutes
- Country: Italy
- Budget: €10 million

The Lark Farm (Italian: La masseria delle allodole) is a 2007 Italian drama film directed by Paolo and Vittorio Taviani about the Armenian genocide.

== Plot ==
The story, drawn from Skylark Farm (La masseria delle allodole), the best-selling novel by Antonia Arslan, tells about the Avakian clan, an Armenian family living in Turkey and having two houses. The Avakians feel convinced that the rising tide of Turkish hostility on the horizon means little to them and will scarcely affect their day-to-day lives. The Avakians do not pay attention to the warning signs, and set about preparing for a family reunion with the impending visit of two well-to-do sons - landowner Aram, who resides in Turkey, and Assadour, a physician living in Venice. These illusions come crashing down when a Turkish military regiment crops up at the house, annihilates every male member of the family and forces the ladies to trek off into the Syrian desert, where they will be left to rot. With them goes one of the little boys of the family, who was dressed as a girl in order not to be killed. Along the journey, the Turks continue to commit horrible atrocities, including forcing an Armenian mother to crush her newborn baby son to death. Meanwhile, a handsome Turkish officer (Moritz Bleibtreu) falls in love with Aram's daughter and makes an aggressive attempt to deliver her from certain death, even as the circumstances surrounding him attest to the astounding difficulty of doing so. Upon being given orders to burn the women alive, he chooses to behead her.

== Cast ==
- Paz Vega as Nunik
- Moritz Bleibtreu as young officer
- Alessandro Preziosi as Egon
- Ángela Molina as Ismene
- Arsinée Khanjian as Armineh Avakian
- Mohammad Bakri as Nazim
- Tchéky Karyo as Aram Avakian
- Mariano Rigillo as Assadour
- Hristo Shopov as Isman
- Hristo Zhivkov as Sarkis
- André Dussollier as Col. Arkan
- Yvonne Sciò as Livia

== Reception ==
The film won the Cinema Award at the 2007 Ephebo d'Oro film festival.

== See also ==
- Armenian genocide in culture
