= Roberto Perpignani =

Italian film editor (born 1941)

- Born: 20 April 1941 (age 85); Rome, Italy
- Occupation: Film editor
- Years active: 1962-present
- Spouse: Grazia Volpi (died 2020)

Roberto Perpignani (born 20 April 1941) is an Italian film editor.

== Biography ==
He started his career in 1962 as assistant editor in Orson Welles' The Trial. His first credit as film editor is for Bernardo Bertolucci's Before the Revolution.

He won three David di Donatello for Best Editing, in 1983 for Paolo e Vittorio Taviani's The Night of the Shooting Stars, in 1995 for Michael Radford's Il Postino: The Postman and in 1997 for Roberto Faenza's Marianna Ucria. Perpignani was also awarded a Premio Bianchi at the 53rd Venice International Film Festival.

=== Personal life ===
Perpignani was married with film producer Grazia Volpi, who produced many of the Taviani brothers' films, until her death in 2020.

== Selected filmography ==
- The Trial (1962)
- Before the Revolution (1964)
- Nessuno mi può giudicare (1966)
- Mi vedrai tornare (1966)
- Johnny Colt (1966)
- China Is Near (1967)
- Don Juan in Sicily (1967)
- Man, Pride and Vengeance (1967)
- Partner (1968)
- A Long Ride from Hell (1968)
- Cuore di mamma (1969)
- Battle of Neretva (1969)
- That Splendid November (1969)
- Under the Sign of Scorpio (1969)
- Corbari (1970)
- Invasion (1970)
- The Spider's Stratagem (1970)
- Blindman (1971)
- Shadows Unseen (1972)
- Execution Squad (1972)
- Lover of the Great Bear (1972)
- St. Michael Had a Rooster (1972)
- Allonsanfàn (1973)
- Pete, Pearl & the Pole (1974)
- The Divine Nymph (1975)
- Footprints on the Moon (1975)
- Private Vices, Public Pleasures (1976)
- Quanto è bello lu murire acciso (1976)
- Padre Padrone (1977)
- A Simple Heart (1977)
- The Meadow (1979)
- A Leap in the Dark (1980)
- Honey (1981)
- Sweet Dreams (1981)
- The Night of the Shooting Stars (1982)
- Kaos (1984)
- My Dearest Son (1985)
- Salomè (1986)
- The Moro Affair (1986)
- Good Morning, Babylon (1987)
- Young Distance (1988)
- I ragazzi di via Panisperna (1989)
- The Sun Also Shines at Night (1990)
- Fiorile (1993)
- Il Postino: The Postman (1994)
- With Closed Eyes (1994)
- The Elective Affinities (1996)
- Marianna Ucrìa (1997)
- You Laugh (1998)
- The Second Wife (1998)
- Dancing at the Blue Iguana (2000)
- The Fine Art of Love (2005)
- The Lark Farm (2007)
- Hidden Love (2007)
- The Trick in the Sheet (2010)
- Caesar Must Die (2012)
- Muhammad: The Messenger of God (2015)
- Wondrous Boccaccio (2015)
- Rainbow: A Private Affair (2017)
- Massimo Troisi: Somebody Down There Likes Me (2023)
