= The Night of the Shooting Stars =

1982 Italian fantasy war drama film

- Italian poster
- Directed by: Paolo Taviani; Vittorio Taviani
- Written by: Paolo Taviani; Vittorio Taviani; Giuliani G. De Negri; Tonino Guerra
- Produced by: Giuliani G. De Negri
- Starring: Omero Antonutti; Margarita Lozano
- Cinematography: Franco Di Giacomo
- Edited by: Roberto Perpignani
- Music by: Nicola Piovani
- Distributed by: United Artists Classics (USA)
- Release date: 16 September 1982
- Running time: 105 minutes
- Country: Italy
- Language: Italian

The Night of the Shooting Stars (UK: The Night of San Lorenzo, Italian: La Notte di San Lorenzo) is a 1982 Italian fantasy war drama film directed by Paolo Taviani and Vittorio Taviani. It was written by Giuliani G. De Negri, Paolo Taviani, Tonino Guerra, and Vittorio Taviani. It was entered into the 1982 Cannes Film Festival, where it won the Jury Special Grand Prix. The film was selected by Italy as its entry for the Best Foreign Language Film at the 55th Academy Awards, but was not accepted as a nominee.

== Plot ==
The film opens with a mother telling her sleeping son a story from her childhood. The story recounts how wishes come true when a shooting star occurs. She proceeds to tell the story of the Italian town where she once lived at the end of World War II, in the summer of 1944. The film proceeds following several inhabitants of the town, including a young girl named Cecilia.

A man and his pregnant fiancée marry in the church. After their marriage, the family of the bride quickly celebrate, indicating some trepidation at being caught by the Germans or their allies.

Defeat is looking certain for the German army and their front is retreating out of Italy. Even so, they leave a path of destruction in their wake. The Germans plan to blow up several buildings in the town and have told all the villagers to congregate in the town's church. Approximately half of the town decides to stay and place their trust in the church. The rest of the town dresses in dark clothing to escape into the night unseen. The groom, first seen in the beginning of the movie, joins the retreating group while his wife and her mother stay in the church. Those who leave hope to find the American army, rumored to be nearby and liberating towns as they arrive.

The bishop wants to say mass with the townspeople in the church. He finds only two pieces of bread for communion. One of the townspeople mentions that she has a loaf of bread. The bishop asks her, and the rest of the congregation, to divide up their bread so he can bless it and use it instead of the standard host. While he is performing communion, the Fascists explode a bomb in the church. The townspeople flee in panic, screaming and crying, pulling bodies out of the church as they try to escape. One girl is seen being carried outside by her mother; it becomes clear that it is the groom's young bride. The bishop tries to help carry the young woman, presumably deceased. As the mother continues to carry her, the young woman's husband returns, discovering it is too late to save her.

The young man returns to his group and they continue their trek. They pass a field where partisans are harvesting the grain. The partisans share their complaints that they're replacing the grain stolen by the Fascists. The group had learned on the road that the partisans can help transport people safely to a city away from the Fascists. The group helps the partisans harvest grain. During the day, the group must hide from German planes that fly over at midday while they are threshing.

Cecilia recounts how there were shooting stars that night – it was a holiday, the night of San Lorenzo, or "night of wishes" – but the people were so caught up in the pain and fear of the moment that they forgot all about it. In the afternoon of the next day, the group is discovered by a small group of Fascists. Both sides begin fighting and sustain casualties, but at the end the Fascists run away. Cecilia watches a Fascist kill her grandfather. As the Fascist comes after Cecilia, she repeats a rhyme that her mother had taught her to say whenever she is afraid. As she says the lines, a Roman soldier appears with a spear and a shield. The soldier throws the spear and pierces the Fascist in the chest. As the Fascist looks up in surprise, a line of Roman warriors appears and throw their spears, killing the Fascist and saving her.

The remaining members of the group survive the fight and find a farm willing to host them. That night, Galvano, the elderly leader of the group, and Concetta, one of the older ladies in the group, share a room, leading them to reveal that they have had feelings for each other since they were young. The group wakes up to the news that the region has been liberated by the U.S. Fifth Army. As they celebrate their new freedom in the rain, they decide to head home.

The mother tells her sleeping son to remember the lines of the rhyme, and it is revealed that the mother is Cecilia, the child in the story.

== Cast ==
- Omero Antonutti as Galvano
- Margarita Lozano as Concetta
- Claudio Bigagli as Corrado
- Miriam Guidelli as Belindia
- Massimo Bonetti as Nicola
- Enrica Maria Modugno as Mara
- Sabina Vannucchi as Rosanna
- Giorgio Naddi as Bishop
- Renata Zamengo as La Scardigli
- Micol Guidelli as Cecilia
- Massimo Sarchielli as Father Marmugi
- Giovanni Guidelli as Marmugi Junior
- Mario Spallino as Bruno
- Paolo Hendel as Dilvo
- David Riondino as Giglioli

== Reception ==
=== Critical response ===
The Night of the Shooting Stars has an approval rating of 79% on review aggregator website Rotten Tomatoes, based on 14 reviews, and an average rating of 6.9/10.

The film was given a rapturous review in The New Yorker by the critic Pauline Kael, who wrote,

"The Night of the Shooting Stars is so good, it's thrilling. This new film encompasses a vision of the world. Comedy, tragedy, vaudeville, melodrama – they're all here, and inseparable... In its feeling and completeness, Shooting Stars may be close to the rank of Jean Renoir's bafflingly beautiful Grande Illusion... unreality doesn't seem divorced from experience (as it does with Fellini) – it's experience made more intense... For the Tavianis, as for Cecilia, the search for the American liberators is the time of their lives. For an American audience, the film stirs warm but tormenting memories of a time when we were beloved and were a hopeful people."

=== Awards and nominations ===
The film was entered into the main competition of 1982 Cannes Film Festival where it won the Grand Prix. In July 2018, it was selected to be screened in the Venice Classics section at the 75th Venice International Film Festival.

== Historical references ==
In 1954, the 10th anniversary of the massacre, the Taviani brothers had directed the documentary San Miniato luglio '44, which attributed the bombing that happened in their home town to the withdrawing German troops. However, at the same time the documentary came out there were already opinions and reconstructions of the events, coming from witnesses of the bombing, that the massacre had not been caused by German troops, but were the result of collateral damage from American artillery. Subsequently, several investigations of the Massacre of San Miniato established that American artillery collateral damage was the real cause. When the 1982 film was shown, its disproven contention caused significant backlash.

== Music ==
Original music composed and conducted by Nicola Piovani. Existing music used in this film includes

- Richard Wagner, "O Star of Eve" from Tannhäuser
- Giuseppe Verdi: Messa da Requiem

== See also ==
- List of submissions to the 55th Academy Awards for Best Foreign Language Film
- List of Italian submissions for the Academy Award for Best Foreign Language Film
