= Quanto è bello lu murire acciso =

- Directed by: Ennio Lorenzini
- Cinematography: Gualtiero Manozzi
- Edited by: Roberto Perpignani
- Music by: Roberto De Simone
- Release date: March 4, 1976
- Language: Italian

Quanto è bello lu murire acciso, also known as The Expedition and How Wonderful to Die Assassinated, is a 1976 Italian historical drama film directed by Ennio Lorenzini. It depicts the failed expedition organized by Carlo Pisacane in 1857 to provoke a rising in the Kingdom of the Two Sicilies.

For this film Lorenzini won the Nastro d'Argento for Best New Director and a special David di Donatello.

== Cast ==
- Giulio Brogi as Major De Liguoro
- Stefano Satta Flores as Carlo Pisacane
- Angela Goodwin as Enrichetta
- Bruno Corazzari as 'Ntoni
- Alessandro Haber as Nicotera

== See also ==
- List of Italian films of 1976
