= St. Michael Had a Rooster =

- Directed by: Paolo and Vittorio Taviani
- Written by: Paolo and Vittorio Taviani
- Produced by: Giuliani G. De Negri
- Starring: Giulio Brogi; Renato Scarpa
- Cinematography: Mario Masini
- Edited by: Roberto Perpignani
- Music by: Benedetto Ghiglia
- Release date: 1972
- Country: Italy
- Language: Italian

St. Michael Had a Rooster (Italian: San Michele aveva un gallo) is a 1972 Italian drama film directed by Paolo and Vittorio Taviani. It is an adaptation of Tolstoy's short story The Divine and the Human.

Morando Morandini described the film as "a charming fable about the political and existential conflict between utopian socialism and scientific socialism, between two ways of understanding the revolution, the anarchist one and the Marxist one".

The film was selected for the Quinzaine des Realisateurs in the 1972 Cannes Film Festival.

== Plot ==
In 1870 the internationalist anarchist Giulio Manieri led a group of comrades in an unrealistic revolutionary attempt in a small Umbrian town, Città della Pieve, which ended in an inevitable failure that cost him the death sentence.

However, the sentence is commuted to life imprisonment and Manieri spends the interminable days of solitary confinement staging political debates with himself, thus managing to survive the isolation but gradually sliding towards insanity.

After ten years of imprisonment, it is decided to transfer him to another prison. During the boat trip to the new accommodation, in the Venetian lagoon, he meets another boat carrying a group of subversive young people to the same destination. Convinced of finding in them a common feeling and of being able to resume together that debate that has continued alone for years, he discovers instead that his utopian idealism and his methods of struggle are not at all shared, but rather disavowed if not even mocked by the new generation of rebels, animated by a radically different political strategy, less dreamy and more concrete, based on the scientific analysis of reality, and convinced that they cannot personally witness the great changes but to work for the future.

Deeply disappointed by this confrontation, feeling useless and overtaken by history, he lets himself slip into the water to drown.

== Cast ==
- Giulio Brogi as Giulio Manieri
- Renato Scarpa as Battistrada
- Daniele Dublino as The Prison Guard
- Renato Cestiè

== See also ==
- List of Italian films of 1972
