= Caesar Must Die =

2012 film

- Theatrical release poster
- Directed by: Paolo Taviani; Vittorio Taviani
- Screenplay by: Paolo Taviani; Vittorio Taviani
- Based on: Julius Caesar by William Shakespeare
- Produced by: Grazia Volpi
- Starring: Salvatore Striano; Cosimo Rega; Giovanni Arcuri; Antonio Frasca
- Cinematography: Simone Zampagni
- Edited by: Roberto Perpignani
- Music by: Giuliano Taviani; Carmelo Travia
- Production companies: Rai Cinema; La Talee; Stemal Entertainment
- Distributed by: Sacher Distribuzione
- Release dates: 11 February 2012 (Berlin); 2 March 2012 (Italy)
- Running time: 75 minutes
- Country: Italy
- Language: Italian

Caesar Must Die (Italian: Cesare deve morire) is a 2012 Italian drama film directed by Paolo and Vittorio Taviani. The film competed at the 62nd Berlin International Film Festival where it won the Golden Bear. The film is set in Rebibbia Prison (suburb of Rome), and follows convicts in their rehearsals ahead of a prison performance of Julius Caesar.

== Cast ==
- Salvatore Striano as Bruto (Brutus)
- Cosimo Rega as Cassio (Cassius)
- Giovanni Arcuri as Cesare (Caesar)
- Antonio Frasca as Marcantonio (Mark Antony)
- Juan Dario Bonetti as Decio (Decius Brutus)
- Vincenzo Gallo as Lucio (Lucius)
- Rosario Majorana as Metello (Metellus Cimber)
- Francesco De Masi as Trebonio (Trebonius)
- Gennaro Solito as Cinna (Cinna)
- Vittorio Parrella as Casca (Casca)
- Pasquale Crapetti as Legionär
- Francesco Carusone as Wahrsager (Soothsayer)
- Fabio Rizzuto as Stratone (Strato)
- Maurilio Giaffreda as Ottavio (Octavius)
- Fabio Cavalli as Theatre director

== Reception ==
=== Critical response ===
Caesar Must Die has an approval rating of 92% on review aggregator website Rotten Tomatoes, based on 50 reviews, and an average rating of 7.5/10. The website's critical consensus states: "An ultra-immersive experience that captures the senses and boggles the mind, this leaves no room to question that Caesar Must Die". Metacritic assigned the film a weighted average score of 77 out of 100, based on 20 critics, indicating "generally favorable reviews".

Critics praised the use of actual prisoners in the film, saying it added greater intensity to the piece. Filmed largely in black-and-white, it has been described as a "deeply humanist film" that "blends gentle humour with an emotional punch". Paolo Taviani said that he hoped moviegoers would "say to themselves or even those around them... that even a prisoner with a dreadful sentence, even a life sentence, is and remains a human being". Vittorio Taviani read out the names of the cast. The Hollywood Reporter described the outcome as "a major upset". Der Spiegel said it was a "very conservative selection". Der Tagesspiegel criticised the outcome, saying that the "jury shunned almost all the contemporary films that were admired or hotly debated at an otherwise pretty remarkable festival".

=== Accolades ===
Caesar Must Die won the Golden Bear at the 62nd Berlin International Film Festival in February 2012 where British director Mike Leigh led the judging panel. The film was also selected as the Italian entry for the Best Foreign Language Oscar at the 85th Academy Awards, but it did not make the final shortlist.

== See also ==
- List of black-and-white films produced since 1970
- List of submissions to the 85th Academy Awards for Best Foreign Language Film
- List of Italian submissions for the Academy Award for Best Foreign Language Film
