= Wondrous Boccaccio =

- Movie poster
- Italian: Maraviglioso Boccaccio
- Directed by: Paolo and Vittorio Taviani
- Screenplay by: Paolo and Vittorio Taviani
- Based on: The Decameron by Giovanni Boccaccio
- Produced by: Luigi Musini; Donatella Palermo
- Starring: Lello Arena; Paola Cortellesi; Carolina Crescentini; Flavio Parenti; Vittoria Puccini; Michele Riondino; Kim Rossi Stuart; Riccardo Scamarcio; Kasia Smutniak; Jasmine Trinca; Josafat Vagni
- Cinematography: Simone Zampagni
- Edited by: Roberto Perpignani
- Music by: Giuliano Taviani; Carmelo Travia
- Distributed by: Stemal Entertainment, Cinemaundici Film
- Release date: February 20, 2015 (Florence premiere)
- Running time: 120 minutes
- Countries: Italy; France
- Language: Italian

Wondrous Boccaccio (Italian: Maraviglioso Boccaccio) is a 2015 Italian film directed by Paolo and Vittorio Taviani. It is loosely based on stories from The Decameron by Giovanni Boccaccio.

== Plot ==
During the mid-14th century, in Florence, some young people of rich families are fleeing the city haunted by the plague. They take refuge in a large country house, and spend their time there telling stories.

The first story is set in Modena. Messer Gentile Garisendi is in love with Catalina, wife of Nicoluccio. She falls ill and her husband's mother fears that she has plague and will infect others in the household. She insists that she be taken away to the countryside to be cared for away from others. Her husband reluctantly agrees to this plan. On the trip, she dies. The carriage driver dumps her body off in a crypt at an abandoned church. Meanwhile, Gentile who had followed her carriage, sees her body in the crypt. He kisses her, and feels her heart beating. He takes her to his mother's villa where she is nursed back to health. He tells her that he wants to marry her. He invites a group of friends, including Nicoluccio, to see his chosen bride. He poses the question to the gathered group: a loyal servant falls ill and his patron abandons him. If another man picks up the servant, nurses him to health, shouldn't the second man be able to keep the servant? Nicoluccio answers, saying that the original patron has lost his right to have the servant and that he rightfully belongs to the second man. At that moment, Gentile reveals Catalina to the group, saying that she must decide between him and Nicoluccio. Nicoluccio, horrified, says she has come from hell. She looks at him, and says that no, I have come from paradise. She rejects him, remembering how he did not stay with her and turned her out in her illness.

In the second story: in Florence the oaf Calandrino apprentices in an art studio of a famous painter. Two of his fellow apprentices trick him by telling him of a stone that has the power to make people invisible. They go with him to the riverside to find such a stone. He finds one and they pretend that he is invisible. They convince their neighbors to play along with the ruse. Calendrino returns, carrying this stone, thinking that he is invisible, stealing gold from his neighbors' pouches, leering at a young woman, kicking the cane out from under the master painter. He arrives home and his wife, who doesn't know of the trick, looks at him and tells him his dinner is ready. He is horrified, believing that she has somehow cast a spell to drain the stone of its power. He accuses her of witchcraft and beats her. The story ends with her holding the stone above his head as he is eating at the dinner table.

Third story is set in Salerno. Duke Tancredi marries his daughter Ghismunda to a rich, older man. Soon after, the rich husband dies, and she falls in love with a handsome young man, a metal smith who works for her father. The father finds out, becomes enraged, and has him killed, later serving his heart to Ghismunda in a goblet of her lover's making. Ghismunda is torn by grief, and she melts the heart and adds poison to it. Ghismunda drinks the poison and dies.

City of Certaldo. One night, the nuns of the convent discover a nun in the arms of a man, and go to reveal this adultery to the mother superior. Unbeknownst to them, the mother superior is hiding her own lover in her chamber. So, in her hurry to dress, the mother superior confuses her headgear for the long johns of her lover. As she is passing judgment on the transgressing sister, her own secret is thus discovered by the nuns. At the end of the story, the mother superior is forced to pardon the sisters, and declares that God made everyone to have elements of sinners and saints within their souls, so each of them can bring lovers to the convent, as long as the news of the adulterers does not leave.

The last story: the knight Federico Alberighi is in love with Giovanna, but she does not love him. He spends all his money in courtship and has nothing left but a falcon. She marries another man, with whom she has a son. Years later, the man dies and she moves to a villa, which happens to be near Federico's country property. Her son befriends Federico and begins to learn falconry. Her son falls ill and asks for the falcon as a gift. Giovanna goes to Federico's home to discuss this with him. While she is there, he realizes that he has nothing to serve Giovanna for dinner, and so he kills the beloved falcon to make her dinner. She realizes this, and is horrified. The son later dies and Giovanna moves away. Eventually, her brothers come to find Federico and tell him that the time has come for her to remarry, but she will have no other suitor but Federico. They ask if he will accept her offer and he does.

== Cast ==
- Lello Arena: Duke Tancredi
- Paola Cortellesi: Badessa Usimbalda
- Carolina Crescentini: Isabetta
- Flavio Parenti: Nicoluccio Cacciamanico
- Vittoria Puccini: Catalina
- Michele Riondino: Guiscardo
- Kim Rossi Stuart: Calandrino
- Riccardo Scamarcio: Gentile Garisendi
- Kasia Smutniak: Ghismunda
- Jasmine Trinca: Giovanna
- Josafath Vagni: Federico Alberighi
- Rocco Di Gregorio: Ricciardo
- Melissa Anna Bartolini
- Riccardo Bocci
- Eugenia Costantini
- Miriam Dalmazio
- Camilla Diana
- Niccolò Diana
- Fabrizio Falco
- Beatrice Fedi
- Ilaria Giachi
- Barbara Giordano
- Rosabell Laurenti Sellers

== Production ==
The film was produced through Cinemaundici and Stemal Entertainment with support from Rai Cinema. Filming took place in Tuscany during ten weeks, from 31 March 2014.

== See also ==
- The Decameron (film)
