= Kaos (film) =

1984 Italian drama film

- Film poster
- Directed by: Paolo and Vittorio Taviani
- Written by: Luigi Pirandello; Paolo and Vittorio Taviani; Tonino Guerra
- Produced by: Giuliani G. De Negri
- Starring: Margarita Lozano
- Cinematography: Giuseppe Lanci
- Edited by: Roberto Perpignani
- Music by: Nicola Piovani
- Release date: 1984
- Running time: 188 minutes
- Country: Italy
- Language: Italian

Kaos (originally Chaos in the US) is a 1984 Italian anthology drama film directed by Paolo and Vittorio Taviani based on short stories by Luigi Pirandello (1867–1936). The film's title is after Pirandello's explanation of the local name Càvusu of the woods near his birthplace in the neighborhood of Girgenti (Agrigento), on the southern coast of Sicily, as deriving from the ancient Greek word kaos. The film is based on Pirandello's collection Novelle per un Anno (Short Stories for a Year). The film was made in Italy in 1984. The cinematographer was Giuseppe Lanci, and the music was composed by Nicola Piovani.

The film is called Kaos after Pirandello’s birthplace (today called Villaggio Pirandello, “Pirandello Village”), and its name is associated with the Greek god of chaos.

== Plot ==
All the stories take place in Sicily in the second half of the nineteenth century or the early twentieth century. The different episodes are connected by a crow, which peasants capture in the very short opening scene, tie a bell around its neck, and release. The crow flies above their heads, ringing like a herald—sometimes of misfortune, sometimes of good fortune—accompanied by a recurring musical motif (leitmotif). The crow also symbolizes the social outcast, since in the opening scene it is caught while incubating eggs despite being male; the peasants therefore initially torment it and only later release it with the bell around its neck. Social outcasts (or marginal, excluded figures) stand at the center of the first three stories of the film. At the end of the first story, the outcast painfully reconciles himself with his condition; at the end of the second, he is granted renewal and consolation; at the end of the third, he emerges as a victorious hero. The fourth story does not deal with an outcast, but it closes the circle, since the peasants from the opening scene reappear in it.

The film is essentially realistic, yet in almost every episode there is a short, delicate, and surprising surrealistic moment. Moreover, in most of the episodes there are subtle allusions to other parts of the film—hints that become noticeable mainly upon a second or third viewing. Part of the film’s delicate surrealism is expressed in scenes where the directors introduce a strange, restrained silence into an otherwise dynamic plot, sometimes precisely in situations where people would normally be noisy. Such scenes appear in all the stories: for example, in the cruel game of Rocco Trupia’s gang (in the first story), in the dance around the jar (in the third story), and in the dispersal of the demonstration (in the fourth story).

== The Plots of the Stories ==
=== The Other Son ===
The story begins with an old woman dictating a letter to a local girl, addressed to her sons, in which she expresses her intense desire to receive a letter from them, fourteen years after they emigrated and cut off all contact. The woman is a lonely village widow whose sons emigrated to America and left her alone in a remote Sicilian village. Again and again she sends them letters, but they never reply. The villagers consider her mad. When another group of young villagers prepares to leave, the old woman comes to the meeting place to entrust them with a letter for her distant sons. She then discovers that in recent years the girl who supposedly writes her letters has been mocking her and merely scribbling meaningless lines, since none of the real letters she had dictated were ever answered anyway.

At this point, the village doctor—the only educated man in the area—gets to know her. Having heard that she is alone because all her sons abandoned her, he is surprised to discover that a young man who follows her from a distance with devotion and care is also her son—yet she refuses to acknowledge him and drives him away. The doctor gently questions her and hears her tragic story. This son was born as the result of a rape committed by a gang leader named Rocco Trupia, who brutally murdered her husband during the period of Garibaldi’s independence struggles and played with his skull. Because of the boy’s striking resemblance to his father, the mother cannot bear his presence and relentlessly rejects him, despite his unwavering devotion.

The son, overhearing the story, realizes that his attempt to establish a relationship with his mother is hopeless. He leaves, placing a few fruits before her as a farewell gesture. The weeping mother rolls a pumpkin toward him—an act that appears both as a rejection of his gift and perhaps also as a final attempt to overcome her inner barriers and communicate with him. Yet the sound of the rolling pumpkin reminds her (and the viewer) of the skull once played with by the murderers. She shudders and withdraws, and the son, understanding, walks away. Both mother and son suffer in their loneliness, bound by horrific memories of the past for which there is no remedy and no resolution. At the end of the story, the mother once again begins to dictate the same letter she has been dictating for fourteen years—this time to the doctor—still preferring the futile imagined bond to the impossible real one.

=== Mal di Luna (Moon Sickness) ===
This episode centers on Batà, a young peasant who has just married a girl from a nearby village named Sidora and brought her to his isolated home. The girl married him because her mother preferred him over her cousin, Saro. Sidora follows Batà, unaware that her husband suffers from moon sickness. Every month, on the night of the full moon, he is seized by uncontrollable madness.

When the fatal night approaches for the first time since their marriage, Batà orders Sidora to lock herself in the house and not let him in under any circumstances, without explaining why. Only when she hears his howls and frantic pounding on the door, and after he smashes the window and pulls her hair in his frenzy, does she realize what she has unwittingly married into. In the morning she flees to her mother’s house. Batà comes there, stands in the street for a long time, until Sidora, moved by pity, brings him a chair. He then tells his story to the villagers: when he was a baby, his mother had to work in the fields on a full-moon night and left him in a cradle facing the moon, which bewitched him. Since then he has been moon-struck.

He apologizes for not revealing his illness earlier but explains that if he had, no woman would have wanted him. He suggests that Sidora return home, and that when the next full moon comes, her mother should stay with her. Sidora agrees to return only after her mother promises to come together with her beloved cousin Saro, secretly hoping to rekindle her youthful love. However, Saro, who at first was eager for a passionate night with Sidora, sees Batà during an attack and is overcome with compassion. The young, curly-haired cousin, who had seemed carefree until then, reveals empathy and sensitivity toward the suffering husband and loses all desire for the affair. To the shocked Sidora he says: “I can’t… he is suffering.” At this moment, the viewer’s attitude toward Batà also changes—from a frightening figure to a tormented and sympathetic one.

Sidora makes one last attempt to seduce Saro, but he follows his conscience. Overcoming his fear, he approaches Batà, restrains his convulsions, and helps Sidora overcome her terror and draw close again to her husband.

=== The Jar ===
Don Lolo, a tyrannical landowner, orders a huge clay jar to store the oil from his olive harvest. The jar arrives safely and is placed on a platform in the courtyard to Lolo’s pride. But at night, the enormous new jar mysteriously breaks in two. Lolo is devastated, but his wife and workers summon a jar-mender in Sicily, a hunchbacked master craftsman who possesses a glue of his own invention.

The craftsman repairs the jar, but at Don Lolo’s insistence he must also reinforce it with metal staples. To do so, he must climb inside the jar before it is sealed—and he fails to realize that his hump will prevent him from exiting once it is repaired. Don Lolo refuses to break the jar to free him unless the craftsman agrees to compensate him for the damage, and so the hunchback remains trapped.

During the night, however, the trapped man gathers Don Lolo’s workers around him, eager for an opportunity to rebel against their oppressive master. They bring him food and drink and surround him with wild singing and dancing, which turns into a surreal, half-pagan spectacle, while Don Lolo hides fearfully with his wife in their mansion. The story ends when the enraged and humiliated Don Lolo kicks the jar, rolls it until it shatters irreparably, and the hunchback is freed unconditionally, walking away proud, victorious, and as mysteriously as he arrived.

=== Requiem ===
The inhabitants of Margari, a tiny and remote mountain village, demand a cemetery of their own. The old man who founded the village is dying and refuses to be buried, like his predecessors, in the cemetery of the district town below, where the baron lives—the landowner on whose land the village was built. The baron claims that the villagers settled on his land without permission and, although he tolerates their presence in life, he refuses to allow the dead to “occupy” his land underground.

Police escort the villagers back to their village, but upon arrival they find everyone gathered around a grave already dug for the dying old man, who sits before it in his chair, calmly awaiting death. By the baron’s order, the police begin destroying the emerging cemetery, but the old man deceives them by pretending to be dead. Confronted with death, the police retreat and leave. After they depart, the villagers take the old man out of the coffin and seat him respectfully in his chair, waiting together for his real death beside the open grave. The episode ends with this strange image of silent, restrained waiting for death.

=== Epilogue – Conversation with Mother ===
In the final episode, Luigi Pirandello himself appears, returning to his Sicilian birthplace for the first time since his mother’s death. Life in Rome has become burdensome, and he feels an inner call to return home. He gets off at the village train station (presumably Kaos, after which the film is named) and sees imaginary images of children who later turn out to be his mother and uncles in their youth.

The opening of this segment is filled with images from the previous four stories and numerous allusions to them, suggesting a blurring of the boundary between imagination and reality (most notably, the carriage driver who takes him home is none other than Saro from the second story). The music accompanying his arrival becomes different and almost unsettling, lending the scenes a dreamlike quality. In his mother’s house, Pirandello imagines her sitting and speaking with him, in a figure that seems momentarily real. He asks her to repeat a story she once told him, explaining that he wants to write it down but has forgotten part of it. The music now heard is the aria “L’ho perduta, me meschina” (“I have lost it, poor me!”) from Mozart’s "The Marriage of Figaro", which his mother used to sing.

The mother begins to tell the story, and the camera shifts to the past, accompanied by her voice. It is a childhood memory of the mother herself, when she sailed with her family to Malta to visit her father, who had been exiled there for his involvement in the 1848 revolution. During the voyage they stop at a limestone island (filmed on the Sicilian island of Lipari), and the sailor encourages the children to slide down the white rocks into the sea, praising the healing properties of the limestone dust. The children joyfully climb and slide into the turquoise water in one of the most beautiful scenes in cinema. They then return to the boat and continue toward Malta.

At this point the story breaks off, the mother’s voice disappears, and the camera returns to Pirandello’s house, where he now stands alone—his mother’s figure having vanished entirely.

Some have claimed that this episode is primarily about atmosphere, music, and cinematography, but this is not the case. In fact, it is a sophisticated Pirandellian play between imagination and reality. The mother’s figure appears so real that the viewer is tempted to believe she is truly present. But the interruption of the story suggests that this is precisely the point at which Pirandello forgot the continuation. Thus it becomes clear—both to him and to the viewer—that the story is not actually being told by the mother, but reconstructed from the writer’s fragmented memory. The brief return to the empty house reinforces the realization that what is lost cannot be recovered—a message that casts a new light on all the stories of "Kaos".

== Reception and Evaluation ==
At the time of its release, "Kaos" received critical attention and praise and won both the David di Donatello Award and the Italian Silver Ribbon. However, it did not generate wide public resonance and was largely forgotten within a few years. Nevertheless, many still consider it today one of the finest, most distinctive, moving, delicate, and sophisticated films ever made in the history of cinema.

== Reviews ==
- Janet Maslin, Chaos (1984), The New York Times, 13 October 1985.
- David Denby Poets and Peasants, New York 24 February 1986, pp. 62–63.
