= Nicola Piovani =

Italian composer

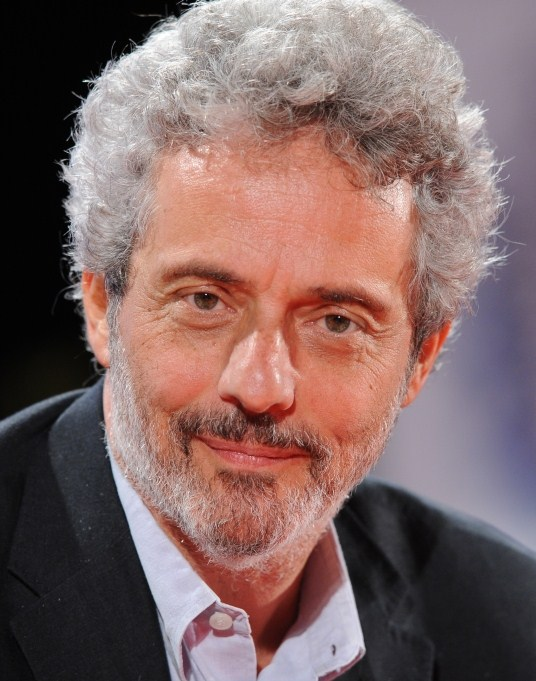
- Piovani in 2010

Background information
- Born: 26 May 1946 (age 80); Rome, Italy
- Genres: Film score; contemporary classical music; theatrical; opera
- Occupations: Composer, conductor
- Years active: 1971–present
- Website: www.nicolapiovani.net

Nicola Piovani (born 26 May 1946) is an Italian composer of contemporary classical music and film, television, and theatrical scores. A graduate of the Verdi Conservatory and pupil of Manos Hatzidakis, he began his professional career in the 1960s, and has written over 190 film scores since 1968.

He is known for his collaborations with eminent directors like Roberto Benigni, Giuseppe Tornatore, Mario Monicelli, Nanni Moretti, and the Taviani Brothers. Piovani succeeded Nino Rota as Federico Fellini's go-to composer for his final three films. He won an Academy Award and was nominated for a Grammy Award for his work on Benigni's Life Is Beautiful (1997).

Aside from his film scores, Piovani also works in musical theatre and opera, and also writes concert and chamber music.

== Life and career ==
After high school, Piovani enrolled at the Sapienza University of Rome, receiving his degree in piano from the Verdi Conservatory in Milan in 1967, and later studied orchestration under the Greek composer Manos Hadjidakis.

In 1971 and 1973 collaborated for the music of two albums of the songwriter Fabrizio De André: Storia di un impiegato and Non al denaro non all'amore né al cielo. In 2008, after De André departure, Piovani wrote the music for the film Amore che vieni, amore che vai, inspired by a novel of De André himself, Un destino ridicolo.

Among his more popular works is the score for the Federico Fellini film Intervista, his second of three collaborations with the famous director, the others being Ginger e Fred (Ginger and Fred in English) and La voce della luna (The Voice of the Moon). Years later, he composed a ballet titled Balletto Fellini.

In 2000, his Academy Award-winning score for Life Is Beautiful (La Vita è bella) was further nominated for a Grammy Award in the "Best Instrumental Composition Written for a Motion Picture, Television or Other Visual Media" category, losing to Randy Newman. In 2005, he was a member of the jury at the 27th Moscow International Film Festival. In light of his work with French directors, notably Danièle Thompson, Philippe Lioret, and Éric-Emmanuel Schmitt, the French Minister of Culture gave him the title of Chevalier (Knight) of the Ordre des Arts et des Lettres on 21 May 2008 at the Cannes Film Festival.

To date, Piovani has over 130 film scores to his credit, including films such as Slap the Monster on Page One (1972), The Perfume of the Lady in Black (1974), Flavia the Heretic (1974), Le Orme (1975), A Leap in the Dark (1980) The Night of the Shooting Stars (1982), and Kaos (1984). However, he is reported to believe that "Too many film scores make a composer a hack, but in the theatre music is above all craftsmanship". Accordingly, he continues to work in musical theatre, and also composes concert and chamber music. In 2024, Piovani composed the score for Loris Lai's debut feature film, How Kids Roll.

Piovani also composed the first opera Amorosa presenza on a libretto by Aisha Cerami and Piovani, based on the novel by Vincenzo Cerami and is performed at the Teatro Verdi in Trieste in January 2022. His second opera, Il labirinto di Creta, premiered at the Teatro Petruzzelli in Bari in May 2024.

Piovani was the President of the Jury at the Sanremo Music Festival 2013.

In 2019 he received the "Leonardo The Immortal Light" Prize from the International Committee Leonardo da Vinci for his contributions to music. The award was presented by the Embassy of Italy in Bucharest during the concert “L’Italia nell’energia della Musica”.

In 2022, he was appointed artistic director of the Gigi Proietti Globe Theatre in Rome.

In 2023, he was awarded the Lifetime Achievement Award from the World Soundtrack Academy.

On 13 October 2026, he received the first-ever Banca Ifis Music Award at the 21st Rome Film Festival opening ceremony; the award was presented to him by Marco Bellocchio.
