= Giuseppe Lanci =

Italian cinematographer (born 1942)

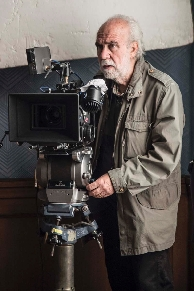
- Born: 1 May 1942 (age 83); Rome, Italy
- Occupation: Cinematographer
- Years active: 1977—2012

Giuseppe Lanci (born 1 May 1942) is an Italian cinematographer.

Born in Rome, he graduated from the Centro Sperimentale di Cinematografia. Lanci is probably best known for his long collaboration with director Marco Bellocchio; for Bellocchio's Devil in the Flesh, he won the 1986 David di Donatello for Best Cinematography. He has also worked, among others, with Paolo and Vittorio Taviani, Nanni Moretti, Lina Wertmüller, Andrei Tarkovsky, Margarethe von Trotta, Mauro Bolognini, Luis Sepúlveda, and Roberto Benigni.
