= Paolo and Vittorio Taviani =

Italian film directors and screenwriters

Taviani brothers
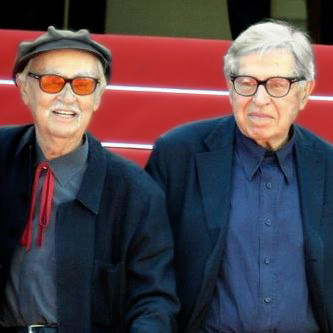
- Vittorio (left) and Paolo Taviani in 2015
- Born: Paolo Taviani; 8 November 1931; San Miniato, Tuscany, Kingdom of Italy
- Died: 29 February 2024 (aged 92); Rome, Italy
- Occupations: Film director; film producer; screenwriter; film editor
- Years active: 1962–2024
- Spouse: Lina Nerli
- Born: Vittorio Taviani; 20 September 1929; San Miniato, Tuscany, Kingdom of Italy
- Died: 15 April 2018 (aged 88); Rome, Italy
- Occupations: Film director; film producer; screenwriter; film editor
- Years active: 1962–2018

Paolo Taviani (Italian: [ˈpaːolo taˈvjaːni]; 8 November 1931 – 29 February 2024) and Vittorio Taviani (Italian: [vitˈtɔːrjo taˈvjaːni]; 20 September 1929 – 15 April 2018), collectively referred to as the Taviani brothers, were Italian film directors and screenwriters who collaborated on numerous film productions.

At the Cannes Film Festival, the Taviani brothers won the Palme d'Or and the FIPRESCI prize for Padre Padrone in 1977 and the Grand Prix du Jury for La notte di San Lorenzo (The Night of the Shooting Stars, 1982). In 2012 they won the Golden Bear at the Berlin International Film Festival with Caesar Must Die.

== Career ==
Both born in San Miniato, Tuscany, Italy, the Taviani brothers began their careers as journalists. In 1960 they came to the world of cinema, directing with Joris Ivens the documentary L'Italia non è un paese povero (Italy is not a poor country). They went on to direct two films with Valentino Orsini, Un uomo da bruciare (A Man to Burn) (1962) and I fuorilegge del matrimonio (Outlaws of Marriage) (1963).

Their first anonymous film was I sovversivi (The Subversives, 1967), with which they anticipated the events of 1968. With actor Gian Maria Volonté they gained attention with Sotto il segno dello scorpione (Under the Sign of Scorpio, (1969) where one can see the echoes of Brecht, Pasolini, and Godard.

In 1971, they co-signed the media campaign against Milan's police commissioner Luigi Calabresi, published in the magazine L'espresso.

The revolutionary theme is present both in San Michele aveva un gallo (1971), an adaptation of Tolstoy's novel The Divine and the Human, a film greatly appreciated by critics, and in the film Allonsanfan (1974), in which Marcello Mastroianni has a role as an ex-revolutionary who has served a long term in prison and now views his idealistic youth in a much more realistic light, and nevertheless gets entangled in a new attempt in which he no longer believes.

Their next film Padre Padrone (1977) (Palme d'Or at the Cannes Film Festival), taken from a novel by Gavino Ledda, speaks of the struggle of a Sardinian shepherd against the cruel rules of his patriarchal society. In Il prato (1979) there are nonrealistic echoes, while La notte di San Lorenzo (The Night of the Shooting Stars, 1982) narrates, in a fairy-tale tone, a marginal event in the days leading up to the end of World War II, in Tuscany, as seen through the eyes of some village people. The film was awarded the Special Jury Award in Cannes.

Kaos (1984)—another literary adaptation—is a poignantly beautiful and poetical film in episodes, taken from Luigi Pirandello's Short Stories for a year. In Il sole anche di notte (1990) the Taviani brothers transposed in 18th century Naples the story from Tolstoy's Father Sergius.

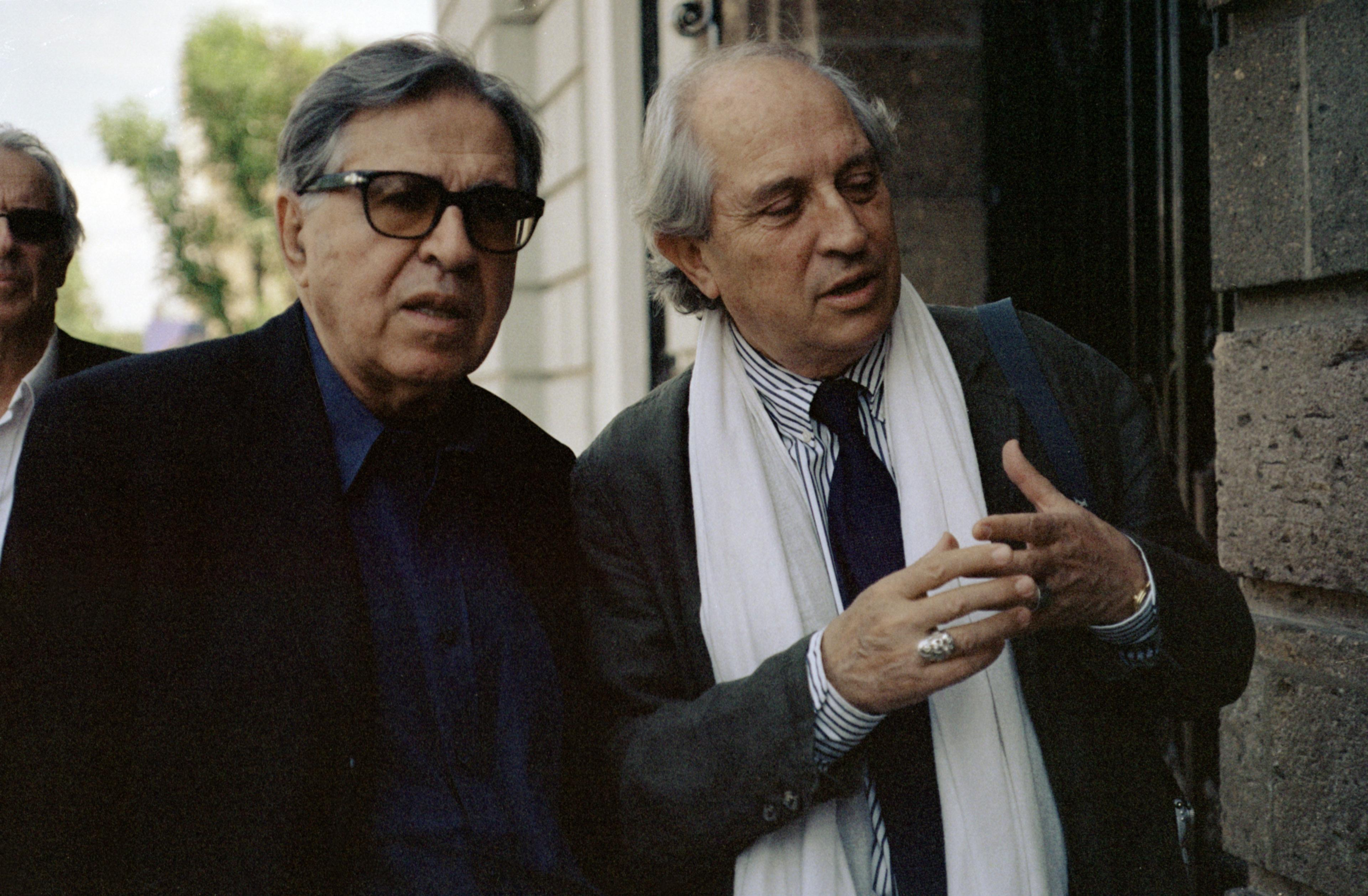
Paolo Taviani and Vittorio Storaro

From then onwards, the Tavianis' inspiration proved faltering. Successes like Le affinità elettive, (1996, from Goethe) and an attempt to woo the international audiences like Good morning Babilonia, (1987), on the pioneers of cinema history, alternate with lesser films like Fiorile (1993) and Tu ridi (1996), inspired by the characters and short stories of Pirandello.

In the 2000s, the brothers turned successfully to directing television films and miniseries, such as Leo Tolstoy's Resurrection (2001) and Alexandre Dumas's Luisa Sanfelice (2004), as well as La masseria delle allodole (2007), presented at the Berlin Film Festival in the section 'Berlinale Special'.

Their film Caesar Must Die won the Golden Bear at the 62nd Berlin International Film Festival in February 2012. The film was also selected as the Italian entry for the Best Foreign Language Oscar at the 85th Academy Awards, but it did not make the final shortlist.

On 15 April 2018, Vittorio Taviani died in Rome after a long illness at the age of 88.

Paolo Taviani died of a pulmonary edema in Rome, on 29 February 2024, at the age of 92.

== Filmography ==
=== As film directors ===
- San Miniato, luglio '44 (1954)
- L'Italia non è un paese povero (together with Joris Ivens, 1960)
- A Man for Burning (together with Valentino Orsini, 1962)
- Outlaws of Love (together with Valentino Orsini, 1963)
- The Subversives (1967)
- Under the Sign of Scorpio (1969)
- St. Michael Had a Rooster (1972)
- Allonsanfàn (1974)
- Padre Padrone (1977)
- The Meadow (1979)
- The Night of the Shooting Stars (1982)
- Kaos (1984)
- Good Morning, Babylon (1987)
- The Sun Also Shines at Night (1990)
- Fiorile (1993)
- The Elective Affinities (1996)
- You Laugh (1998)
- Resurrection (TV film, 2001)
- La primavera del 2002 - L'Italia protesta, l'Italia si ferma (2002), collectively made with 46 other directors
- Luisa Sanfelice (TV miniseries, 2004)
- The Lark Farm (2007)
- Caesar Must Die (2012)
- Wondrous Boccaccio (2015)
- Rainbow: A Private Affair (2017)
- Leonora addio (2022, first and last film directed only by Paolo Taviani)

=== As screenwriters ===
- San Miniato, luglio '44 (with Valentino Orsini and Cesare Zavattini, 1954)
- A Man for Burning (with Valentino Orsini, 1962)
- Outlaws of Love (with Lucio Battistrada, Giuliani G. De Negri, Renato Niccolai and Valentino Orsini, 1963)
- The Subversives (1967)
- Under the Sign of Scorpio (1969)
- St. Michael Had a Rooster (based on a story by Leo Tolstoy, 1972)
- Allonsanfàn (1973)
- Padre padrone (based on a book by Gavino Ledda, 1977)
- The Meadow (with Gianni Sbarra, 1979)
- The Night of the Shooting Stars (with Giuliani G. De Negri and Tonino Guerra, 1982)
- Kaos (based on short stories by Luigi Pirandello, 1984)
- Good Morning, Babylon (with Tonino Guerra, 1987)
- The Sun Also Shines at Night (with Tonino Guerra, based on Father Sergius by Tolstoy, 1990)
- Fiorile (with Sandro Petraglia, 1993)
- The Elective Affinities (based on Elective Affinities by Goethe, 1996)
- You Laugh (based on short stories by Pirandello, 1998)
- Resurrection (based on Resurrection by Tolstoy, 2001)
- Luisa Sanfelice (based on La Sanfelice by Alexandre Dumas, père, 2004)
- Rainbow: A Private Affair (based on A Private Matter by Beppe Fenoglio, 2017)

== Awards ==
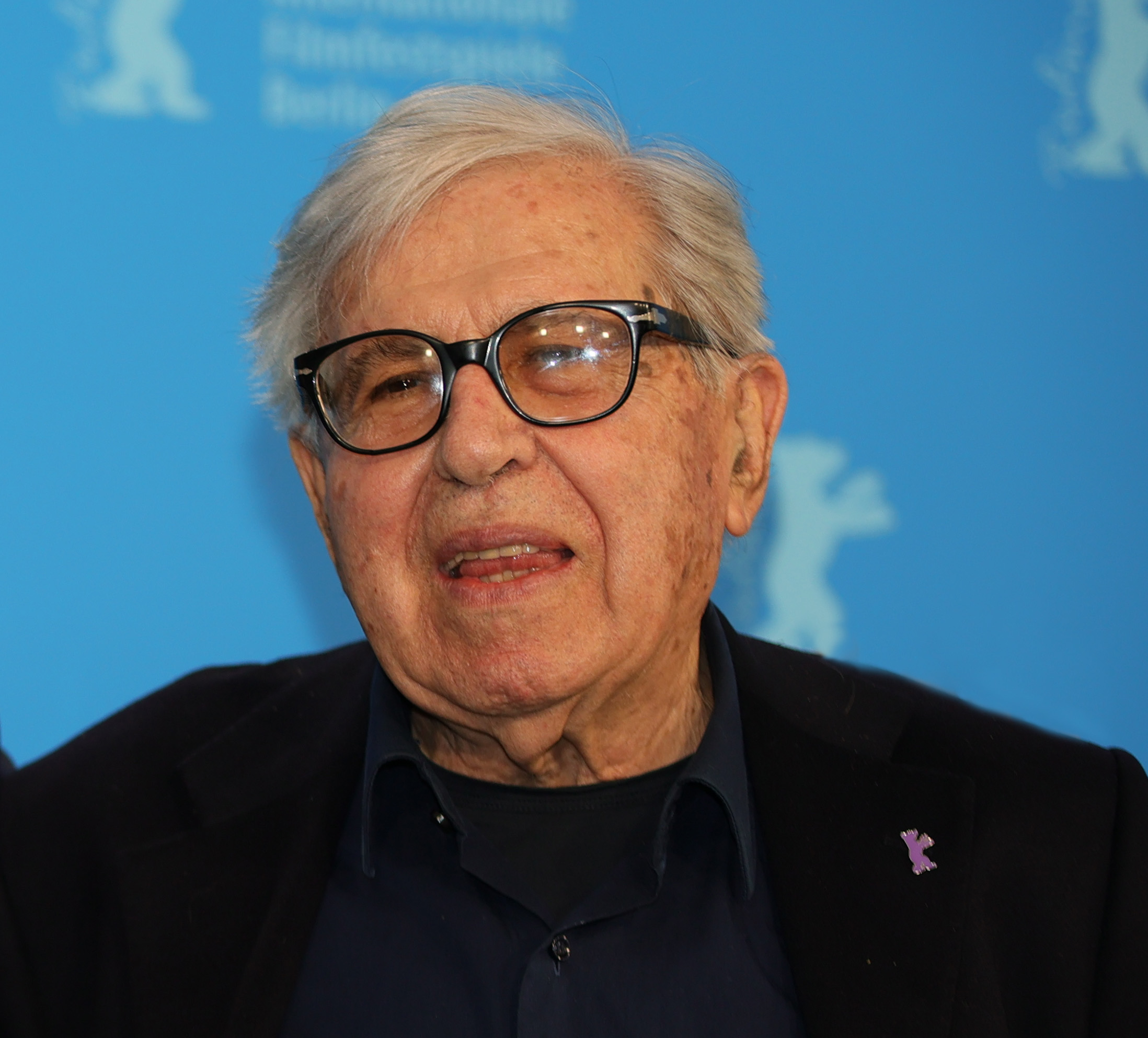
Paolo Taviani at the 72nd Berlin International Film Festival, 2022

- 1977: Palme d'or at Cannes Film Festival for Padre Padrone - Father and Master.
- 1977: Grand Prix for Padre Padrone - Father and Master, Berlin International Film Festival
- 1978: Special David di Donatello for Padre Padrone - Father and Master.
- 1982: Grand Prix at Cannes Film Festival for The Night of the Shooting Stars.
- 1983: David di Donatello for Best Film and David di Donatello for Best Director for The Night of the Shooting Stars.
- 1984: Italian Golden Globes Golden Globe for Best Film for The Night of the Shooting Stars.
- 1985: Italian Golden Globes Golden Globe for Best Film for Kaos.
- 1985: David di Donatello for Best Script for Kaos.
- 1986: Leone d'Oro (Golden Lion) Life Career of the Venice International Film Festival.
- 2002: Golden St. George at the 24th Moscow International Film Festival for Resurrection
- 2005: Italian Golden Globes Career Prize
- 2007: Efebo d'oro for The Lark Farm.
- 2008: Laurea honoris causa in "Cinema, Theatre and Multimedia Production" by the Faculty of Literature and Philosophy of the University of Pisa.
- 2012: Golden Bear and Prize of the Ecumenical Jury - Berlin International Film Festival for Caesar Must Die.
- 2012: David di Donatello for Best Film and David di Donatello for Best Director for Caesar Must Die.
