= Colizzi =

Colizzi is an Italian surname. Notable people with the surname include:

- Chiara Colizzi (born 1968), Italian voice actress
- Giuseppe Colizzi (1925–1978), Italian film director
- Johann Andreas Kauchlitz Colizzi (1742–1808), Dutch musician
- Pino Colizzi (1937–2026), Italian actor and voice actor
- Vittorio Colizzi (born 1949), Italian virologist
