= Sapore di mare 2 - Un anno dopo =

- Directed by: Bruno Cortini
- Written by: Cesare Frugoni; Bruno Cortini; Carlo Vanzina
- Starring: Gianni Andaldi; Angelo Cannavacciuolo; Massimo Ciavarro; Isabella Ferrari; Giorgia Fiorio; Karina Huff; Pascale Reynaud; Mauro Di Francesco; Eleonora Giorgi
- Cinematography: Blasco Giurato
- Music by: Gianni Boncompagni
- Release date: 2 December 1983
- Country: Italy
- Language: Italian

Sapore di mare 2 - Un anno dopo is a 1983 Italian teen romantic comedy film directed by Bruno Cortini and written by Bruno Cortini, Cesare Frugoni and Carlo Vanzina. It stars Gianni Ansaldi, Angelo Cannavacciuolo, and Massimo Ciavarro. It is the sequel of Time for Loving.

== Cast ==
- Massimo Ciavarro: Fulvio Comanducci
- Isabella Ferrari: Selvaggia
- Eleonora Giorgi: Tea
- Mauro Di Francesco: Uberto Colombo
- Angelo Cannavacciuolo: Paolo Pinardi
- Karina Huff: Susan
- Gianni Ansaldi: Gianni
- Giorgia Fiorio: Giorgia
- Ugo Bologna: Carraro
- Gianfranco Barra: Antonio Pinardi
