= Volevo i pantaloni (film) =

- Directed by: Maurizio Ponzi
- Written by: Leonardo Benvenuti; Piero De Bernardi; Maurizio Ponzi; Bruno Carbuglia; Roberto Ivan Orano
- Produced by: Mario & Vittorio Cecchi Gori
- Starring: Giulia Fossà; Lucia Bosè; Ángela Molina
- Cinematography: Maurizio Calvesi
- Music by: Giancarlo Bigazzi
- Release date: 20 March 1990
- Country: Italy
- Language: Italian

Volevo i pantaloni (also known as Good Girls Don't Wear Trousers and I Wanted Pants) is a 1990 Italian coming-of-age drama film directed by Maurizio Ponzi. It is based on the bestseller novel Good Girls Don't Wear Trousers written by Lara Cardella. The film was a bomb at the Italian box office, grossing about one billion lire in spite of a budget of five billion lire.

== Plot ==
Annetta is a teenage girl living in rural Italy who attends highschool and lives with her strict parents and brother. Her parents do not allow her much freedom and expect her to comply to traditional cultural norms, especially in relation to how women must behave. Something she has always longed for is to wear trousers, yet her mother forbids her since she doesn't want the other families in the village thinking that Annetta is a "puttana".

Annetta is desperate to wear trousers so decides to become a puttana. To learn how, she befriends Angelina, one of the popular girls, who soon invites her to a party. At the party she meets Nicola, who ends up driving her home. Over the next few weeks, Annetta continues to catch up with Angelina and Nicola but one day, when at the beach, her uncle spots her at wearing 'slutty' clothes, make-up and kissing Nicola. He confronts her and drives her back to her parents' house. Her parents are furious! They beat her and demand to know the name of the boy, but she refuses to tell them since if she does, they will make her marry him. Annetta is pulled out of school and forbidden to leave her room.

Ridiculous rumours soon spread throughout the village that Annetta was discovered naked having a threesome. Her mother is devastated that shame has been brought upon the family and has a breakdown, unable to cook or work for weeks, which infuriates Annetta's father. Eventually it is decided that she should be sent to live with her other uncle and aunt since her parents cannot bear to look at her.

At first, life with her aunt is fantastic! Her aunt is far less conservative than her parents and even allows her to wear trousers, however she soon uncovers dark family secrets and becomes desperate to return to her old life.

== Cast ==
- Giulia Fossà: Anna
- Lucia Bosè: Grazia
- Ángela Molina: Aunt Vannina
- Natasha Hovey: Angelina
- Tony Palazzo: Nicola
- Pino Colizzi: Uncle Vincenzino
- Luciano Catenacci: Michele

== See also ==
- List of Italian films of 1990
