= Beyond Good and Evil (film) =

Beyond Good and Evil (Al di là del bene e del male)
- Belgian film poster
- Directed by: Liliana Cavani
- Written by: Liliana Cavani; Franco Arcalli; Italo Moscati
- Produced by: Robert Gordon Edwards
- Starring: Dominique Sanda; Robert Powell; Erland Josephson; Virna Lisi
- Cinematography: Armando Nannuzzi
- Distributed by: Les Artistes Associés (United Artists)
- Release date: 1977
- Running time: 127 minutes
- Countries: Italy; France
- Languages: Italian; English

Beyond Good and Evil (Italian: Al di là del bene e del male; UK title: Beyond Evil) is a 1977 Italian-French drama-biographical film co-written and directed by Liliana Cavani and starring Dominique Sanda, Erland Josephson and Robert Powell.

This is the second part of "The German Trilogy" directed by Liliana Cavani. In The Night Porter she portrayed the connection between perversion and fascism. This time she depicts the life of Friedrich Nietzsche, a German philosopher who wrote Thus Spoke Zarathustra and Beyond Good and Evil.

Virna Lisi won the Nastro d'Argento Best supporting Actress award (Silver Ribbon) from the Italian National Syndicate of Film Journalists for her role as Elisabeth Nietzsche.

== Premise ==
The film offers a fictionalized account of the legendary relationship of Friedrich Nietzsche, Paul Rée, and Lou Andreas-Salomé, who first met in Italy in 1882. In a style that alternates realistic sequences with surreal, hallucinatory tableaux, the narrative purports to sketch the course of this triangular friendship from its intense beginnings to its painful aftermath, ending with Nietszche’s decline into madness and Rée’s untimely death.

The story begins in Rome, where Paul and Fritz meet the twenty-year-old Lou through a mutual acquaintance. Rejecting the amorous advances of both men, Lou suggests that they establish an intellectual ménage-a-trois, an iconoclastic trinity of like minds. Following their attempt to set up residence in Leipzig, however, the rivalry between Fritz and Paul for Lou’s attention and Lou's reluctance to commit herself sexually to either man conspire to make the arrangement unlivable, and the ménage is dissolved.

== Cast ==
- Dominique Sanda - Lou Salomé
- Erland Josephson - Friedrich Nietzsche
- Robert Powell - Paul Rée
- Virna Lisi - Elisabeth Nietzsche
- Philippe Leroy - Peter Gast
- Elisa Cegani - Franziska Nietzsche
- Umberto Orsini - Bernhard Förster
- Michael Degen - Carl Andreas
- Nicoletta Machiavelli - Amanda
- Amedeo Amodio - Doctor Dulcamara
- Carmen Scarpitta - Malvida
- Clara Algranti - Madame Thérèse

== Background ==
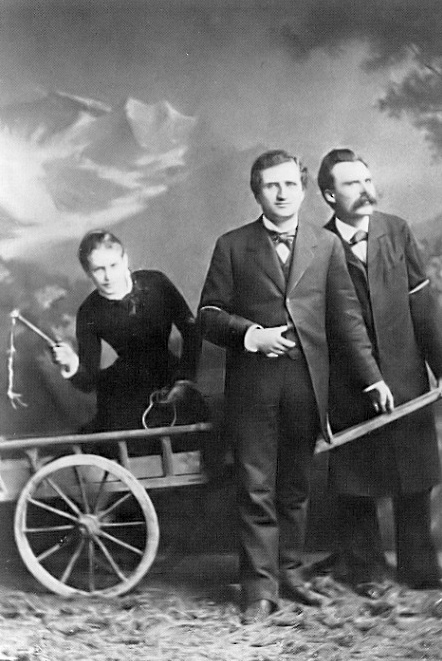
Lou Salomé (left), Paul Rée (center) and Friedrich Nietzsche (1882)

According to Robert Davis, who played Ree, the British Board of Film Classification wouldn't even give the film a certificate. He went on to say that "it was a very serious film but it contained stuff they deemed not fit for the public; I didn't do anything in it that was disgusting, but I didn't have any clothes on for quite a lot of it."

After the film had been released, Cavani stated in an interview that she became fascinated by what she perceived as the "masculine-feminine psychological ambivalence" of the trio. She went on to say that "their ambivalence was emblematic of some personal anxieties of mine, which, I believe, are everybody's: we all have different faces and yet we feel we have only one."

== Release ==
In 1986, when the film was shown in Harbourfront, Toronto, as part of a special retrospective of Cavani's work, the Ontario Film Review Board censored the film, making five cuts to the movie. Cavani said she is "sensitive about censorship, because in Italy every violent film is passed, but every sex scene or scene of passion is cut." She further stated that it is getting better, and she wanted to know if "Rambo was cut here."

== Reception ==
American film critic Janet Maslin wrote that "Cavani attempts to touch the steamy, erotic essence of whatever went on among Miss Andreas-Salome ... and two of her foremost lovers; the problem is not Cavani's directness, but her utter lack of any accompanying approach; those events she takes to be crucial to her characters' sexuality are presented more than bluntly, but very little else about them is made known; the result is a series of overwrought episodes, desperately lacking a larger context and bordering on the absurd."

Film critic William Wolf commented "It...is a strange film, teetering unintentionally on the verge of self-parody. Too often these famous figures come across as being rather obsessed, spoiled, and dilettantish. If Cavani is deadly serious in exploring their lives, she has missed. Nor can the avant-garde feminism of Salome be taken all that seriously, because it gets lost in the concentration on the turgid relationships."

Canadian film critic Jay Scott said "It is a film so fragmented in concept and so preposterous in execution it might almost be a Lina Wertmuller picture soaked in Valium." He considered that "Any moral points Cavani is trying to make (or is trying to avoid making, as the case may be) are overcome by her influence-peddling. Not only does the purple shade of Ken Russell hover over the proceedings, but she has borrowed from every Italian director of consequence...[the film] is always handsome to look at, image by image, but the images never coalesce...and the influences never combine."

Film critic Clyde Gilmour rated the movie as an "instant candidate for a December citation as the worst of '79." He further opined that "the director has emulated another unsavory model, Ken Russell's cycle of distorted screen biographies of famous composers. Nietzsche probably was a fascinating man until he went insane, but you'd never know it from Beyond Good and Evil. The philosopher's life-story is still wide open, for any filmmaker of real talent who wants to tackle it."

== See also ==
- Cinema of Italy
- List of Italian films of 1977
- List of film directors from Italy
- List of LGBTQ-related films of 1977
