= Time for Loving =

- Italian theatrical release poster by Renato Casaro
- Directed by: Carlo Vanzina
- Written by: Enrico Vanzina; Carlo Vanzina
- Starring: Jerry Calà; Marina Suma; Christian De Sica; Angelo Cannavacciuolo; Karina Huff; Isabella Ferrari; Gianni Ansaldi; Giorgia Fiorio; Virna Lisi
- Cinematography: Beppe Maccari
- Edited by: Raimondo Crociani
- Music by: Edoardo Vianello; Mariano Perrella
- Release date: 1983
- Running time: 92 minutes
- Country: Italy
- Language: Italian

Time for Loving (released in Italy as Sapore di mare) is a 1983 Italian teen romantic comedy film directed by Carlo Vanzina. It obtained a great commercial success and launched a short-living subgenre of revival-nostalgic comedy films. It also generated a sequel, Sapore di mare 2 - Un anno dopo. For her performance in this film Virna Lisi won a David di Donatello for Best Supporting Actress and a Silver Ribbon in the same category.

== Plot summary ==
The film is set in the Sixties, in the Tuscan beach of Forte dei Marmi. A group of young friends spends their holidays at the sea. One of them has a girlfriend, but she loves another man, while his brother is with a beautiful American girl, but he prefers another woman. Finally, a shy student falls in love with an older woman. The end of the movie is a fast-forward in which the same friends gather together after twenty years; however, they are sad because everything is different in their life.

== Cast ==
- Jerry Calà: Luca
- Christian De Sica: Felicino
- Isabella Ferrari: Selvaggia
- Marina Suma: Marina
- Virna Lisi: Adriana
- Karina Huff: Susan
- Angelo Cannavacciuolo: Paolo
- Gianni Ansaldi: Gianni
- Giorgia Fiorio: Giorgia

== See also ==
- List of Italian films of 1983
