= Angelo Cannavacciuolo =

Italian writer and screenwriter

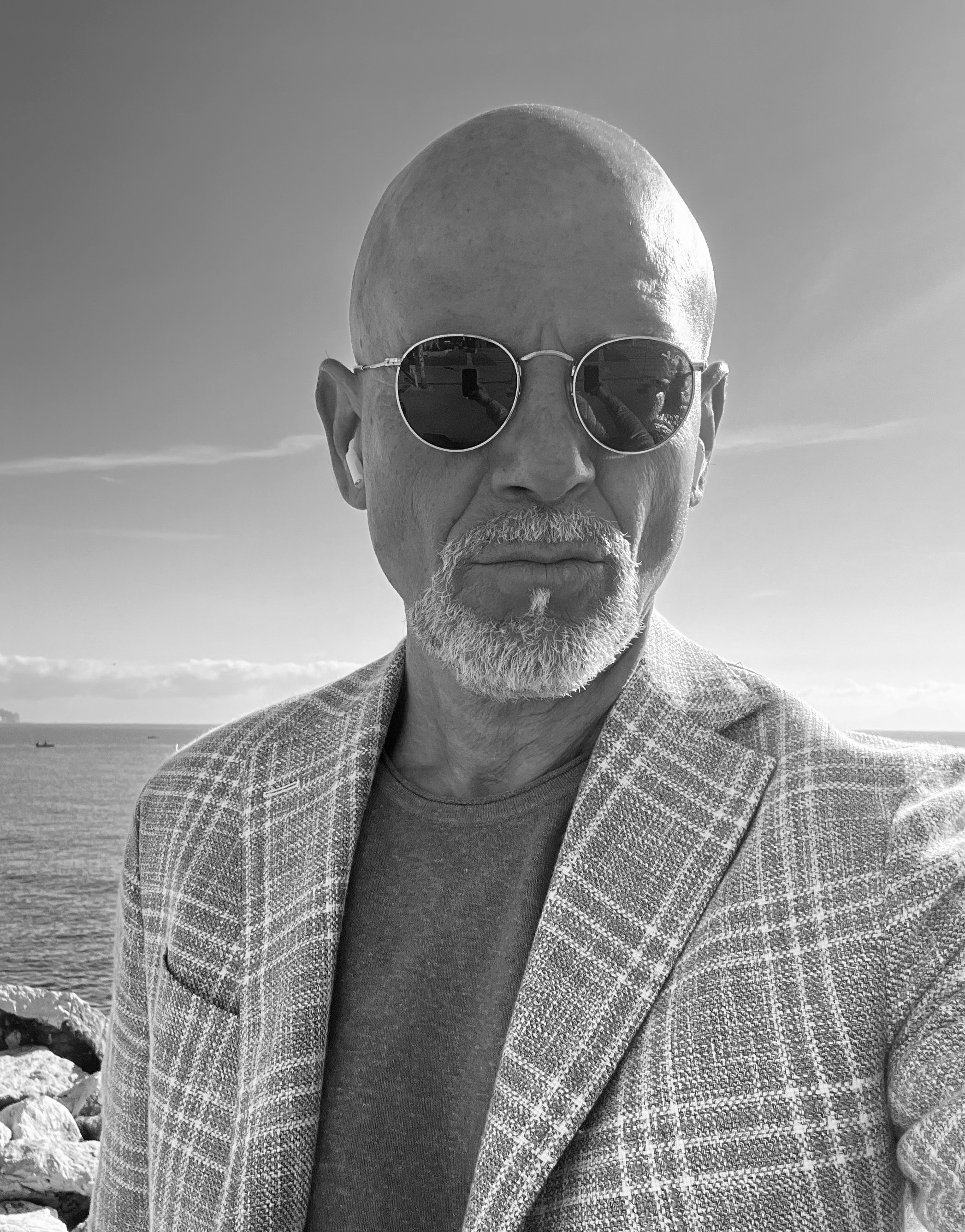
Cannavacciuolo in Naples

Angelo Cannavacciuolo is an Italian writer and film director.

Cannavacciuolo studied at the Faculty of Letters and Philosophy of the Near East at the Istituto Orientale in Naples. He has written, directed and performed for film, theater and television. He lives between Naples and San Francisco and collaborates with various Italian newspapers. Originally a successful actor, he also wrote and directed plays before going on to make his first feature film Malesh (1993). It starred Ida Di Benedetto, Marina Suma. In 1999, he published his first novel Guardiani delle Nuvole which was nominated for the Premio Viareggio and the Premio Giuseppe Berto. It was later turned into a movie by Luciano Odorisio. Cannavacciuolo's second book Il soffio delle Fate was nominated for the Premio Elsa Morante. His fourth novel Le cose accadono met with greater success, winning the Premio Viadana and the Premio Domenico Rea. Apart from novels, he has also written numerous short stories. His works have been presented by the Italian Cultural Institutes of Sarajevo, San Francisco, Los Angeles and New York.

== Works ==
- Le occasioni di Rosa by Salvatore Piscicelli - Venice International Film Festival (1982) Actor - Film
- Sapore di mare by Carlo Vanzina - Italian cult film. (1983) Actor - Film
- Blues metropolitani by Salvatore Piscicelli (1983) Actor - Film
- Sapore di mare 2 - Un anno dopo by Bruno Cortini (1984) Actor - Film
- Vai alla grande by Salvatore Samperi (1985) Actor - Film
- La Trasgressione by Fabrizio Rampelli (1986) Actor - Film
- Malesh by Angelo Cannavacciuolo premiered at Cairo International Film Festival, Incontri International Cinema Festival Sorrento and Festival Cinema Italiano. (1992) Screenwriter, Director - Film
- Guardiani delle nuvole - Baldini & Castoldi (1999) Novel
- El Dorado - RAI - Docu-fiction set in Australia. Screenwriter, Actor - Television
- Il Soffio delle Fate - Baldini & Castoldi (2001) Translated to Serbo-Bosnian by Šahinpašić (2002) Novel
- Il Parco Virgiliano (2001) - Liguori Editore for Galassia Gutenberg - Short Story
- Bianco Natale (2004) Short story collection Guida Editore. Translated to English by Words Without Borders. - Short Story
- Guardiani delle nuvole - film by Luciano Odorisio (2004) Alessandro Gassman, Claudia Gerini, Franco Nero, Anna Galiena, Luisa Ranieri. Music composed by Ennio Morricone. - Screenwriter
- Acque basse - Fazi Editore (2005) Novel
- Oratorio di speranza (2005) Composer Filippo Zigante, Libretto Angelo Cannavacciuolo - Opera
- Le cose accadono - Cairo Editore (2008) Novel
- Il soffio delle fate opera (2008) - Composer Filippo Zigante, Libretto Angelo Cannavacciuolo. Antonín Dvořák Theatre, Ostrava CZ - Opera
- Words in Journey - Parole in viaggio -(2010) Pompeii Teatro Grande featuring Gore Vidal, Jay Parini, Ethan Canin and Jim Nesbit. - Literary event creator.
- Words in Journey Literary Events set in various locations in Campania Featured authors included: Jeffery Deaver, Arturo Perez-Reverte Philppe Claudel, Marcos Giralt Torrente, Joanne Harris, John Domini, Martin Widmark, Valeria Luiselli, Tracy Chevallier.
- Pompeii Echoes from the Grand Tour (2010) Contrasto. Curated by Angelo Cannavacciuolo, featuring photography by Mimmo Jodice. - Book curator & Essay
- Nel Regno di Napoli il contrabbando non e peccato. (2016) Short story collection by Il Mattino and Banco di Napoli. - Short story
- Sacramerica - Ad Est dell'Equatore (2018) - Novel
- Delirious Naples - Fordham (2019) Echoes from Pompeii - Essay
- L'apprendista amante Ad Est dell'Equatore (2019) The Novel The Apprentice Lover by Jay Parini - Translation of novel.
- Traduzioni sotto il 41º parallelo (2021) Curation of translated international short stories from Words Without Borders
- When Things Happen (2023) Rutgers University Press - Translation of Le cose accadono to English by Greg Pell. - Novel

== Awards ==
- Targa Europa per il cinema. "Le Occasione di Rosa" (1982)
- La Torre."Le Occasione di Rosa" 1984
- Premio opera prima Festival du Premier Roman di Chambery "Guardini delle Nuvole" (2000)
- Premio Elsa Morante per la narrativa "Il Soffio delle Fate" (2002)
- Vincitore della Piramide D’oro al Festival del Cairo. "Guardiani delle Nuvole film" (2004)
- Premio Archita: Nuove proposte Culturali - Istituto italiano per gli Studi Filosofici. (2009)
- Premio Viadana per la narrativa "Le Cose Accadono" (2009)
- Premio Domenico Rea per la narrativa "Le Cose Accadono" (2009)
- The Joseph G. Astman Distinguished Scholar Award (2011)
- MIA - Targa alla Carriera - Career award. (2014)
- Premio Letizia Isaia per la narrativa "Sacramerica" (2018)

== Sources ==
- Bio
