= Angelo Rizzoli =

Angelo Rizzoli may refer to:

- Angelo Rizzoli (publisher, born 1889) (1889–1970), Italian publisher
- Angelo Rizzoli (publisher, born 1943) (1943–2013), Italian publisher and son of above
