= Department of Cultural Affairs =

Department of Cultural Affairs may refer to:

- New York City Department of Cultural Affairs
- Department of Cultural Affairs (Kerala)
- Nevada Department of Cultural Affairs
- Iowa Department of Cultural Affairs
- New Mexico Department of Cultural Affairs
- Department of Cultural Affairs, Taipei City Government
