= Eleonora Giorgi =

Italian actress (1953–2025)

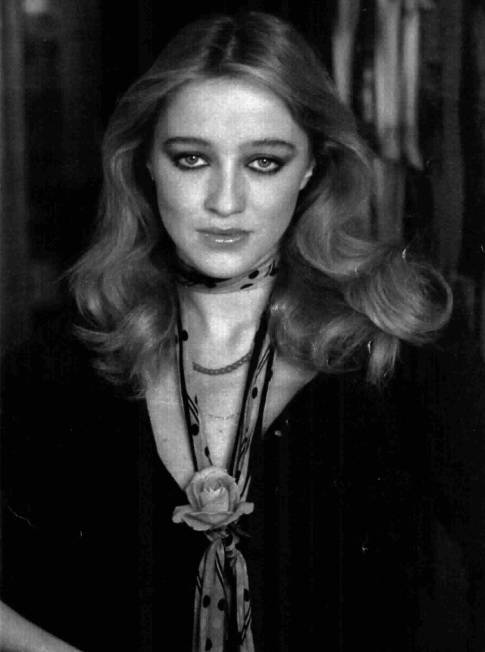
- Giorgi in 1975
- Born: 21 October 1953; Rome, Italy
- Died: 3 March 2025 (aged 71); Rome, Italy
- Occupation: Actress
- Years active: 1971–2018
- Spouse(s): Angelo Rizzoli (m. 1979; div. 1983) Massimo Ciavarro (m. 1993; div. 1996)
- Partner: Andrea De Carlo (1996–2007)
- Children: 2

Eleonora Giorgi (21 October 1953 – 3 March 2025) was an Italian actress. She gained prominence in the 1970s and 1980s, starring in a variety of Italian films, particularly in the comedy and drama genres. She first gained attention with her roles in erotic and giallo films before transitioning to mainstream cinema, where she became a popular figure in Italian comedy, working with directors such as Pasquale Festa Campanile and Carlo Verdone. In 1982, she won the David di Donatello Award for Best Actress for her performance in Borotalco, one of her most acclaimed roles.

== Early life ==
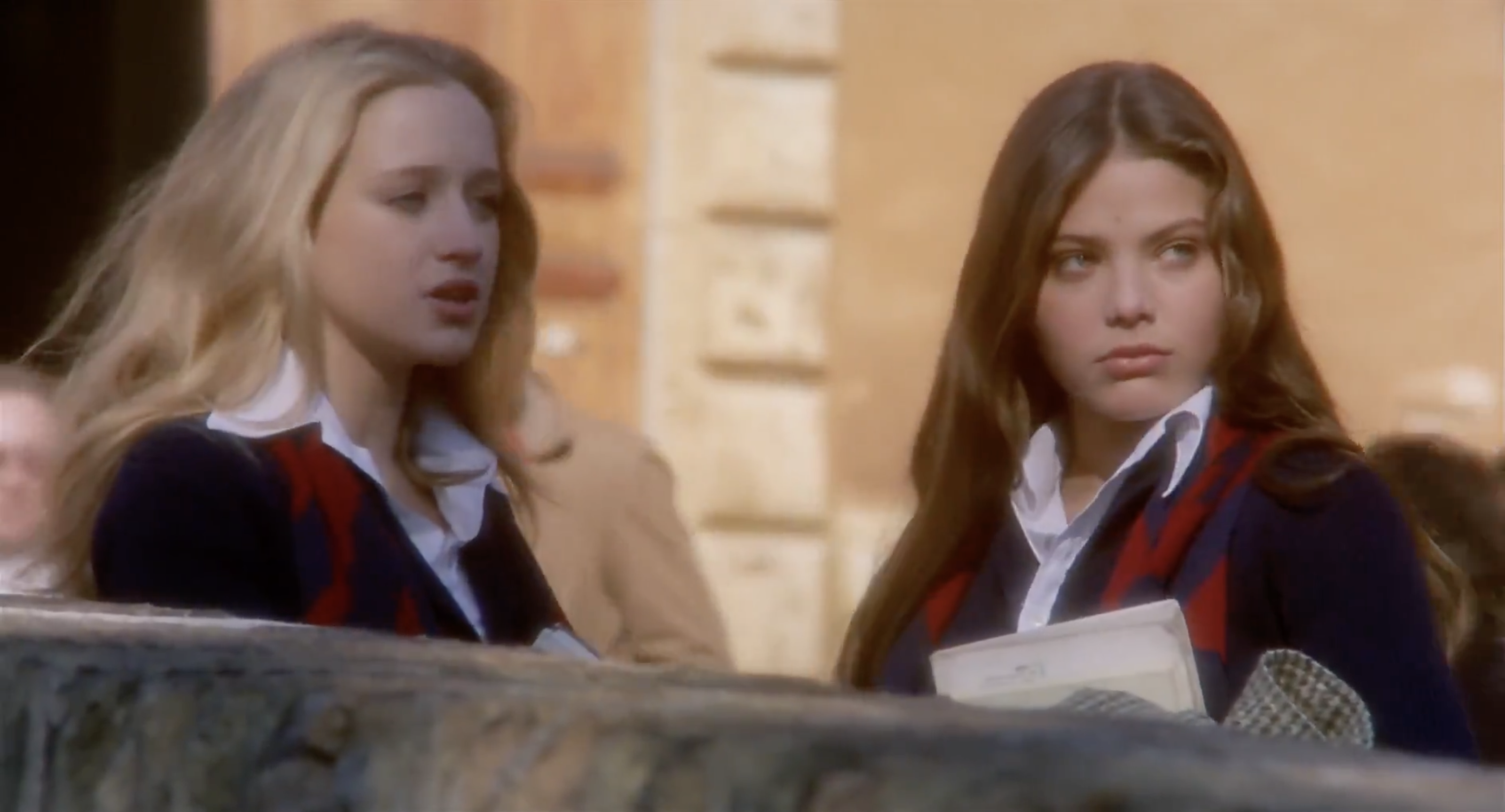
Giorgi (left) and Ornella Muti in a scene from the Italian erotic film Appassionata (1974).

Giorgi was born in Rome, Italy on 21 October 1953. Her father was of Italian and English origin. Her mother was of Italian and Hungarian origin.

== Career ==
Giorgi made her film debut in a minor role in Paolo Cavara's horror film Black Belly of the Tarantula (1971) and subsequently appeared in nearly fifty films, mostly in prominent roles. She first starred in Domenico Paolella's Story of a Cloistered Nun (1973), an important nunsploitation, at age eighteen. She then took part in The Kiss, a fantasy drama directed by Mario Lanfranchi, and in erotic comedies such as Salvatore Samperi's La sbandata (1974), in which she plays near Domenico Modugno and Luciana Paluzzi, Luciano Salce's Alla mia cara mamma nel giorno del suo compleanno (1974), Pasquale Festa Campanile's The Sex Machine (U.S. title: Love and Energy) (1975) and Gianluigi Calderone's Appassionata, that definitively gained her the public acclaim.

Roles in films like Franco Brusati's To Forget Venice (1979), Dario Argento's Inferno (1980), Nino Manfredi's Portrait of a Woman, Nude (1981), and Liliana Cavani's Beyond the Door (1982) are some of her most known and remarkable dramatic performances but in the beginning of the eighties, Giorgi decided to rejoin comedy. She's near Adriano Celentano in Velvet Hands and Grand Hotel Excelsior; for her performance in Carlo Verdone's Talcum Powder (1982), she won the Nastro d'Argento award and David di Donatello award for Best Actress.

In 2003, Giorgi wrote and directed her first film Uomini & donne, amori & bugie (U.S. title: Love, Lies, Kids... & Dogs), with Ornella Muti.

== Personal life and death ==
In 1974 Giorgi lost her boyfriend, fellow actor Alessandro Momo, to a motorcycle accident.

Giorgi was married from 1979 to 1983 to film producer and publisher Angelo Rizzoli, with whom she had a son, Andrea (born 1980). In 1991 she had another son, Paolo, by actor Massimo Ciavarro, to whom she was married from 1993 to 1996.

She was in a relationship with writer Andrea De Carlo between 1996 and 2007.

After suffering from pancreatic cancer from late 2023, Giorgi died in Rome on 3 March 2025, at the age of 71.

== Filmography ==
=== Film ===
| Year | Title | Role | Notes |
|---|---|---|---|
| 1971 | Black Belly of the Tarantula | Beauty Center Maid | Uncredited |
| 1972 | Roma | Motorbike Rider | Uncredited |
| 1973 | The Three Musketeers of the West | Dart's lover | Cameo |
| 1973 | Story of a Cloistered Nun | Carmela Simoni | |
| 1973 | Number One | Girl | Uncredited |
| 1974 | Appassionata | Nicola | |
| 1974 | The Kiss | Elena Vergani | |
| 1974 | Alla mia cara mamma nel giorno del suo compleanno | Angela | |
| 1974 | La sbandata | Mariuccia | |
| 1975 | The Sex Machine | Piera | |
| 1976 | Dog's Heart | Zina | |
| 1976 | Young, Violent, Dangerous | Lea | |
| 1976 | And Agnes Chose to Die | Vandina | |
| 1976 | Born Winner | Marzia | |
| 1977 | Ready for Anything | Anna | |
| 1977 | A Spiral of Mist | Lidia | |
| 1978 | Ça fait tilt | Sylvia | |
| 1978 | Suggestionata | Anna Lori | |
| 1978 | Safari Rally | Lucille Davis | |
| 1978 | Non sparate sui bambini | Ilda | |
| 1979 | To Forget Venice | Claudia | |
| 1979 | A Man on His Knees | Lucia Peralta | |
| 1979 | Velvet Hands | Tilli | |
| 1980 | Inferno | Sara | |
| 1980 | Mia moglie è una strega | Finnicella | |
| 1981 | Portrait of a Woman, Nude | Laura/Rirì | |
| 1982 | Talcum Powder | Nadia Vandelli | |
| 1982 | Beyond the Door | Nina | |
| 1982 | Grand Hotel Excelsior | Ilde Vivaldi | |
| 1983 | Mani di fata | Franca Ferrini | |
| 1983 | Sapore di mare 2 | Tea Guerrazzi | |
| 1984 | Vediamoci chiaro | Eleonora Bauer | |
| 1986 | Giovanni Senzapensieri | Claire | |
| 1988 | Il volpone | Francesca Corvino | |
| 1988 | Compagni di scuola | Valeria Donati | |
| 1996 | Mamma, mi si è depresso papà | Maria | |
| 2003 | Uomini & donne, amori & bugie | None | Director and screenwriter |
| 2006 | Agente matrimoniale | None | Producer |
| 2007 | SoloMetro | Elvira Alvari | |
| 2009 | L'ultima estate | None | Director and screenwriter |
| 2012 | Carlo! | Herself | Documentary |
| 2016 | My Father Jack | Ada Pontecorvo | |
| 2016 | Attesa e cambiamenti | Caterina | |
| 2016 | The Paolella Connection | Herself | Short film |
| 2017 | La mia famiglia a soqquadro | Grandma Fiore | Final film role |

=== Television ===
| Year | Title | Role | Notes |
|---|---|---|---|
| 1977 | Castigo | Hermione | Television film |
| 1983 | Un disco per l'estate | Herself / Host | Annual music festival |
| 1984 | Notti e nebbie | Magda | Television film |
| 1985 | Yesterday | Susy Armani | Television film |
| 1986 | Atto d'amore | Lena | Television film |
| 1987 | Lo scialo | Nella Viani | Television film |
| 1988 | Festa di Capodanno | Barbara Maggesi | Television film |
| 1996 | Death of a Witch | Pina Acciai | Television film |
| 1996 | Uno di noi | Francesca | Episode: "I due amori" |
| 1996 | Andata e ritorno | Attorney Martinez | Television film |
| 2002–2006 | Lo zio d'America | Beatrice Ricciardi | Main role |
| 2007 | Provaci ancora prof! | Dora Cantino | Episode: "L'amica americana" |
| 2016 | Don Matteo | Amelie Rosario | Episode: "La diva" |

== Discography ==
=== Singles ===
- "Quale appuntamento/Messaggio personale" – Dischi Ricordi (1981)
