= Fiorio =

Fiorio is a surname. Notable people with the surname include:

- Alex Fiorio (born 1965), Italian rally driver
- Bill Fiorio, known as Duke Tumatoe (born 1947), American blues guitarist, vocalist and songwriter
- Cesare Fiorio (born 1939), Italian racing driver and Formula One sporting director
- Giorgia Fiorio (born 1967), Italien photographer, artist and essayist

== See also ==
- Caffè Fiorio, is a historic café in Turin, northern Italy
