= Arabella (1967 film) =

1967 Italian comedy film

- Theatrical release poster
- Directed by: Mauro Bolognini
- Written by: Giorgio Arlorio; Adriano Baracco; Brunello Rondi
- Produced by: Maleno Malenotti
- Starring: Virna Lisi; James Fox; Margaret Rutherford; Terry-Thomas
- Cinematography: Ennio Guarnieri
- Edited by: Eraldo Da Roma
- Music by: Ennio Morricone
- Distributed by: Universal Pictures
- Release date: 1967
- Running time: 105 minutes (Italy)
- Country: Italy
- Language: English

Arabella is a 1967 Italian comedy film in the English language, starring Virna Lisi, Margaret Rutherford and James Fox. It was directed by Mauro Bolognini.

== Synopsis ==
The film is a comic farce set in Italy, playing off the interaction between English and Italian stereotypes.

== Cast ==
- Virna Lisi as Arabella Danesi
- James Fox as Giorgio
- Margaret Rutherford as Princess Ilaria
- Terry-Thomas as General Sir Horace Gordon; Duke Pietro Moretti; hotel manager; insurance manager
- Giancarlo Giannini as Saverio
- Milena Vukotic as Graziella
- Paola Borboni as Duchess Moretti
