= Grand Hotel Excelsior =

1982 film by Castellano & Pipolo

- Italian theatrical release poster by Renato Casaro
- Directed by: Castellano & Pipolo
- Written by: Castellano & Pipolo
- Produced by: Mario Cecchi Gori; Vittorio Cecchi Gori
- Starring: Adriano Celentano; Enrico Montesano; Diego Abatantuono; Carlo Verdone; Eleonora Giorgi
- Cinematography: Danilo Desideri
- Edited by: Antonio Siciliano
- Music by: Armando Trovajoli
- Production company: Intercapital
- Distributed by: Cinema International Corporation
- Release date: 1982
- Running time: 114 min
- Country: Italy
- Language: Italian

Grand Hotel Excelsior is a 1982 Italian comedy film directed by Castellano & Pipolo. The film was a commercial success, being the best grossing film in the season 1982/83 at the Italian box office.

== Plot ==
Four funny characters are working in a luxurious Grand Hotel. Mr. Thaddeus is the hotel manager, lover of beautiful music and womanizer; Egisto Costanzi is a waiter who has lost his wife and who is in search of the ideal woman; Segrate is the magician illusionist entertainer during evenings at the Hotel. He is a vainglorious and a bungler, who has never managed to levitate. Finally in the hotel there is a bungler boxer: Pericles, who organizes the end of the story a great evening concert, where they play all four star protagonists of the film.

== Cast ==
- Adriano Celentano: Taddeus
- Enrico Montesano: Egisto Costanzi
- Carlo Verdone: Pericle Coccia
- Diego Abatantuono: Nicolino, Il mago di Segrate
- Eleonora Giorgi: Ilde Vivaldi
- Aldina Martano: Ginevra
- Tiberio Murgia: imbianchino
- Franco Diogene: ingegner Binotti
- Armando Brancia: Bertolazzi
- Enzo Andronico: Manager of Bulldozer

== See also ==
- List of Italian films of 1982
