= Appassionata (1974 film) =

1974 film by Gianluigi Calderone

- Directed by: Gianluigi Calderone
- Written by: Gianluigi Calderone; Alessandro Parenzo; Domenico Rafele
- Starring: Gabriele Ferzetti; Ornella Muti; Eleonora Giorgi; Valentina Cortese
- Cinematography: Armando Nannuzzi
- Edited by: Nino Baragli
- Music by: Piero Piccioni
- Release date: 1974
- Country: Italy
- Language: Italian

Appassionata (also known as Passionate) is a 1974 Italian erotic drama film directed by and co-written by Gianluigi Calderone. The film stars Gabriele Ferzetti, Ornella Muti, Eleonora Giorgi, and Valentina Cortese, and follows a dentist who lives with his mentally ill wife and teenage daughter, but his seemingly stable life is put into jeopardy when both his daughter and his daughter's friend begin sexually pursuing him.

== Plot ==
Emilio is an in-demand dentist who lives a stable life with his wife Elisa, a former opera singer, and their teenage daughter Eugenia. Elisa is mentally ill from wanting to relive her glory days as a singer, and Eugenia often antagonizes her mother while cuddling up to her father, having a long-held incestuous desire for him. One day, Eugenia brings home her friend from high school, Nicola, who Emilio becomes attracted to. Nicole is sympathetic towards Elisa's condition, becoming her friend and the only person who truly attempts to understand and act kind to her. Despite this, Nicola goes to Emilio's office for a dental appointment, and manages to seduce him, beginning a whirlwind sexual affair.

Nicola continues frequenting the family’s house to either hang out with Eugenia or have sex with Emilio in secret. Eugenia makes up promiscuous stories about boys, although she is seemingly a virgin. When Eugenia realises Emilio had overheard one of her stories, she locks herself in her bathroom while her father demands she opens the door. Her father barges in and asks her whether she was telling the truth. Eugenia admits she was not telling the truth but “you didn’t believe me!”. Following this, Emilio comforts Eugenia, apologising for not believing her, however Eugenia uses this as an attempt to seduce her father.

At Eugenia’s birthday party, Nicola attempts to defend Elisa when Eugenia brings all her friends to play with her mothers dresses (even though her mother asks them to be careful with them as they are special to her) and asks her mother to play them some piano. The joyful Elisa entertains the guests to relive her glory days, while Emilio and Nicola covertly go upstairs to have sex.

Eugenia asks her father whether ten days without menstruation means that a girl is pregnant, alleging that she is “asking for a friend” - whom Emilio assumes is Nicola. Fearing that she may be pregnant with his baby, Emilio corners Nicola and asks if she is pregnant to which she insists she isn’t, Emilio then kisses her.

Eugenia then lures and seduces her father. Elisa catches them as they are about to kiss, and she suffers a mental breakdown as a result before Emilio comforts her. Elisa is institutionalized, and this gives Emilio leeway for him to let Nicola move in with him as his lover. Emilio gets drunk and Nicola puts him to bed. In the dark of night, Emilio has passionate sex with a girl who he believes is Nicola. In the morning, however, it is revealed that Eugenia was the girl from the night before, having tricked her father to fulfill her incestuous desires. She gets up from Emilio's bed naked while her father is asleep before he could discover that he had sex with his own daughter. Later, as Emilio wakes up, he looks on from his window as Eugenia and Nicola leave for school together.

== Cast ==
- Gabriele Ferzetti as Dr. Emilio Rutelli
- Ornella Muti as Eugenia Rutelli
- Eleonora Giorgi as Nicola
- Valentina Cortese as Elisa Rutelli
- Ninetto Davoli as Butcher's Boy
- Jeanine Martinovic as
- Renata Zamengo as assistant
- Carla Mancini as patient
- Luigi Antonio Guerra as
