= The Steel Rope =

1954 film by Carlo Borghesio

- Directed by: Carlo Borghesio
- Starring: Brigitte Fossey; Virna Lisi
- Cinematography: Vincenzo Seratrice
- Release date: 29 September 1954
- Countries: Italy; France
- Language: Italian

The Steel Rope (Italian: La corda d'acciaio) is a 1954 melodrama film directed by Carlo Borghesio and starring Brigitte Fossey and Virna Lisi.

== Cast ==
- Brigitte Fossey as Marcella
- Fausto Tozzi as Filippo
- Xenia Valderi as Elsa
- Virna Lisi as Stella
- Nando Bruno as Checco
- Olga Solbelli as Edvige
- Rina Franchetti
