= Born Winner =

1976 crime drama film

- Directed by: Aldo Lado
- Written by: Stefano Calanchi; Luigi Collo
- Produced by: Pino Buricchi
- Starring: Massimo Ranieri; Joe D'Alessandro; Eleonora Giorgi; Marisa Mell
- Cinematography: Cristiano Pogany
- Edited by: Alberto Gallitti
- Music by: Franco Bixio; Fabio Frizzi; Vince Tempera
- Release date: 1976
- Country: Italy
- Language: Italian

Born Winner (Italian: L'ultima volta, lit. 'The last time') is a 1976 Italian crime drama film directed by Aldo Lado.

== Cast ==
- Massimo Ranieri as Sandro
- Joe D'Alessandro as Pericle
- Eleonora Giorgi as Marzia
- Marisa Mell as Giusi
- Pino Colizzi as the bank director
- Giancarlo Badessi as the head pastry chef

== Production ==
The film initially had the working title Una leggera euforia ('A slight euphoria'), and was conceived as a Flavio Bucci vehicle.

== Reception ==
The film historian Eugenio Ercolani described the film as "a sort of homemade, underclass version of Jules et Jim (1962), a Midnight Cowboy (1969) out of tune and off-axis, even if revitalized by the strange duo composed of Joe Dallesandro and Massimo Ranieri."
