= John Domini =

Italian-American author, translator and critic

- Born: 1951; New York City, U.S.
- Died: March 27, 2025 (aged 73–74)
- Education: Boston; Johns Hopkins
- Occupations: Novelist; Book Critic
- Writing career
- Genres: Fiction; essays
- Notable work: The Color Inside a Melon

John Domini (born 1951 – March 27, 2025) was an Italian-American author, translator and critic who has been widely published in literary and news magazines, including The Paris Review, The New York Times, Ploughshares, The Washington Post, and Literary Hub. He was the author of three short story collections, four novels, and a 2021 memoir. Domini published one book of criticism, one book of poetry, and a memoir translated from Italian. He was a member of the National Book Critics Circle. Domini lived in Des Moines with his wife, the science fiction writer Lettie Prell.

Domini taught American Literature and Creative Writing at many places, including Harvard University and Northwestern University.

== Early life ==
Domini was born in New York City on June 30, 1951. His father immigrated to the U.S. from Naples, Italy, after World War II, and his mother was from New York. Domini lived in and around New York City until he moved to Boston for college.

== Education ==
Domini earned a Bachelor of Arts (BA) from Boston University, an MA from Johns Hopkins University, and a Doctorate (Ph.D.) from Union Institute & University. He received grants and fellowships from the NEA and the Iowa Major Artist Award.

== Influences ==
Domini studied with John Barth and Donald Barthelme, writing critical essays on both. Movieola! is dedicated to Barth and Barthelme, in addition to Stanley Elkin, and the poet Anne Sexton, all early teachers of Domini.

Domini also claimed Toni Morrison, Gilbert Sorrentino, and Jaimy Gordon as influences, as well as European influences such as Italo Calvino, Jenny Erpenbeck and W.G. Sebald.

== Career ==
Domini's reviews, essays, fiction and other work were published in a number of magazines and newspapers including The Paris Review, The New York Times, The Literary Review, The Washington Post, Del Sol Review, Conjunctions Magazine, Ploughshares, Literary Hub, Virginia Quarterly Review, Sewanee Review, Brooklyn Rail, and Southwest Review. Domini's fiction has been called "a rich feast" by Pulitzer Prize winner Richard Ford and "elegant" and "gripping" by Booker Prize winner Salman Rushdie. In an essay in The Millions, J.C. Hallman called Domini's work "[a] new shriek for a new century." His work has drawn comparisons to Vladimir Nabokov, Woody Allen, and Nathanael West. His fiction has been lauded as "a lively, generous mind in action thought swift moving, sonorous language" by Tony Ardizzone in Italian Americana.

His debut book of short stories, Bedlam, was published by Fiction International in 1982 and reissued by Dzanc in an expanded version in 2014. The stories examine "social violence and deep and genuine pity" and circle around the subject of love in both real and unreal locales.

His second story collection, Highway Trade, was published by Red Hen Press in 1998. Norah Vincent of The New York Times called the stories "dense prose poems" with characters who "take metaphysical stock of experiences"

Talking Heads: 77, his first novel, was also published by Red Hen Press in 2003., then reissued in 2013 by Dzanc Books The novel explores 1970s alternative news media and the punk rock scene. Tom Simmons, in the Des Moines Register, called it "a very fine novel... written with flashy, pop-culture inventiveness."

Domini then began exploring Italy more in his work. Earthquake I.D., the first novel to do so, was published in 2007 by Red Hen Press and then reissued by Dzanc Books. The novel is set in Naples, the Southern Italian seaport where Domini's father grew up, and follows an American family's experiences there. The novel captures the struggles, also, of immigrant life in Naples. The book was well-received and Steve Erickson, in a blurb, called Domini "a writer of the world." An Italian edition appeared in 2009 on Pironti Editore, and was a runner-up for the Domenica Rea award.

The second in his series of Naples novels came in 2008 with A Tomb on the Periphery, which blended elements of crime fiction, ghost story and coming-of-age to tell a story of the underground market in ancient jewelry. It was selected by Gival Press as a runner-up for their national award and made the short list for "Best of International Publishing" at the London Book Fair. The novel was widely reviewed and Michael Madison, in Bookslut, called it "lush and generous."

This was followed up by another story collection, MOVIEOLA!, published by Dzanc Books in 2016, which explores the language and paraphernalia of the Hollywood industry. The Rumpus called it "feverishly exuberant…both highly visual and incredibly verbal". In 2019, an Italian translation appeared under the same title on Jona Editore. Domini was invited to present the book at the annual Salone Del Libro.

Domini's last novel, The Color Inside A Melon, continued exploring the culture and mythos of Naples, this time from the perspective a refugee from Mogadishu searching for truth about the recent murder of an African immigrant, which threatens to unravel the stability of his own life. Also published by Dzanc Books, The Color Inside A Melon won an honorable mention in the 2019 Book Award from the Italian American Studies Association. Mark Athitakis at Washington Post called the book a "sagely genre-tweaking" story which was "especially well-turned." Domini spent time in Naples and Puglia on a state-arts grant, where his research informed his work.

In 2021, Domini published a memoir, The Archeology of a Good Ragù: Discovering Naples, My Father, & Myself. The book examined his recovery from midlife breakdowns by way of deeper investigations into his father's native city, Naples, and brought together, in new form, many previously published pieces on the ancient seaport, in The New York Times and elsewhere. Brooklyn Rail praised its “painstaking care” and “searing wit,” and a section was reworked to stand alone in Lit Hub.

== Criticism ==
Domini published hundreds of book reviews, as well as longer criticism. In 2014, The Sea-God's Herb was published by Dzanc Books, with selections of his criticism and reviews which have appeared in the New York Times and elsewhere. The book received good notices; Publishers Weekly called it "poetic and philosophical" as well as "enlightening," and Electric Literature praised its "playful prose, intellectual depth, and the breadth of texts it covers."

== Awards ==
Domini received an NEA grant in 1977. He was a recipient of the Ingram-Merrill Fellowship in 1986. In 2009, Domini received an Iowa Major Artist Grant from the Iowa Department of Cultural Affairs.

His poem "Okie Monarchs" won the 2006 Meridian Editors' Prize

== Translation ==
Domini translated Tullio Pironti's memoir, Books & Rough Business, in 2008. It was published by Red Hen Press.

== Bibliography ==
=== Memoir ===
- The Archeology of a Good Ragù: Discovering Naples, My Father, & Myself, memoir, Guernica World Editions, 2021. Ebook & print.

=== Novels ===
- The Color Inside a Melon, novel, Dzanc Books, June 2019.
- A Tomb on the Periphery, novel, Gival Press, 2008. Ebook, 2011. Featured, London Book Fair, 2010. Nominated, Nat'l Book Award, '08. Finalist, Starcherone & Gival Prizes, '05.
- Earthquake I.D., a novel, Red Hen, May 2007. (Glimmer Train award finalist.) Nominated Pulitzer Prize, fall '07. Italian edition, Pironti Editore. April, '09. Ebook, Dzanc Books, 2013.
- Talking Heads: 77, a novel, Red Hen, May 2003. Finalist, Pirate's Alley Faulkner Prize, 1999. Excerpt in Bridge, 1/1; Winter 2000–01. Ebook, Dzanc, 2013.

=== Short story collections ===
- MOVIEOLA! Dzanc Books, linked short stories, June 2016. Co-winner, Dzanc contest; finalist Noemi Press and elsewhere. Italian edition, Jona Editore. May, 2019.
- Highway Trade, linked short stories, Red Hen, June 1998. Finalist for the Mary McCarthy Prize, Sarabande Books, 1997. Ebook, Dzanc, 2014.
- Bedlam, linked short stories, first published by Fiction International in 1982 and then reissued by Dzanc Books in 2014. Ebook, Dzanc.

=== Chapbooks ===
- The Grand McLuckless Road Atlas, Bicycle Review/Pedestrian Press, poetry chapbook: 2013. Ebook & print.

=== Non-fiction ===
- The Sea-God's Herb: Essays & Criticism 1975-2014, Dzanc Books, selected essays and reviews; 2014. Ebook & print, nominated for PEN & NBCC Awards.

=== Short stories ===
- "Home'n'Homer, Portmanteau," The Collagist, June 2013; finalist, T.J. Eckleberg contest.
- "Royal Jelly Pitch & Yaw," elimae, July, 2012.
- "Players, Tawkers, Spawts," Conjunctions, Dec. 2012
- "Blinded by Paparazzi," Gargoyle #54, Spring 2009.
- "Assassins Project…," The Literary Review, Spring '2006
- "Senior Transfer" Agni No. 37; '93.
- "Field Burning" Threepenny Review No. 30; Summer '87
- "Laugh, Kookaberry, Laugh, Gay Your Life Must Be" The Paris Review, Spring 1980
- "Ul'Lyu, Ooo Ooo Ooo" Ploughshares 7/1; Summer '81
- "The Return" Boston Globe Sunday Magazine Nov. 1, '81
- "At the Dig" Massachusetts Review 25/3; Autumn '84
