= Italian Graffiti =

- Directed by: Alfio Caltabiano
- Written by: Alfio Caltabiano; Sandro Continenza
- Starring: Pino Colizzi; Ornella Muti
- Cinematography: Guglielmo Mancori
- Music by: Guido & Maurizio De Angelis
- Release date: 1973
- Language: Italian

Italian Graffiti (Italian: Tutti figli di Mammasantissima) is a 1973 Italian criminal comedy film written and directed by Alfio Caltabiano and starring Pino Colizzi and Ornella Muti.

== Plot ==
Assunta Morano is the daughter of Bug Morano, a Sicilian boss transplanted in Chicago in 1929 where there is prohibition on alcohol sales.

The father took part in the fight between criminal gangs for control over the alcohol market and casinos, but his men are barely capable, starting from his brother Wolf Morano. The goal of Morano is to eliminate the rival gang of so-called "Irish", led by "Reverend". Daughter Santuzza instead of peaceful soul, though passionate, and does not participate of family plans.

Forward to Marano bosses are awaiting the arrival from a "mammasantissima" Sicily with the task of strengthening the team of killers against "Irish". These arrives are called Salvatore Mandolea, has skill with machine gun and shotgun, but it is a good, and especially womanizer. Struck by the beauty of Santuzza, falls in love.

The personal mission of the young man becomes secretly conquer Santuzza; he succeeds and escapes with the intention to get her pregnant; she also loves him then perform a classic fuitina and marry. Back between the two bands will lead a battle to pacify and unite the feuding families, giving birth to a single large band of Sicilian mobsters, mafia less and less incapable, having now heads the mammasantissima Santuzza.

== Cast ==
- Pino Colizzi as Salvatore Mandolea
- Ornella Muti as Santuzza Morano
- Alfio Caltabiano as The Reverend
- Luciano Catenacci as Bug Morano
- Tano Cimarosa as Lupo Morano
- Christa Linder as Dolly
- Brendan Cauldwell as The Chemist
- Furio Meniconi as Lollo Daddarita
- Rina Franchetti as Morano's Mom

== See also ==
- List of Italian films of 1973
