= Merry Christmas... Happy New Year =

- French film poster
- Directed by: Luigi Comencini
- Screenplay by: Raffaele Festa Campanile
- Story by: Luigi Comencini; Cristina Comencini
- Produced by: Fabio Criscuolo; Luigi Patrizi
- Starring: Virna Lisi; Michel Serrault
- Cinematography: Armando Nannuzzi
- Edited by: Sergio Buzi
- Music by: Fiorenzo Carpi
- Distributed by: Titanus
- Release date: 1989
- Running time: 100 minutes
- Language: Italian

Buon Natale... buon anno (internationally released as Merry Christmas... Happy New Year) is a 1989 Italian comedy drama film directed by Luigi Comencini. It is based on the 1986 novel with the same name by Pasquale Festa Campanile. For this film Virna Lisi was awarded with a Silver Ribbon for best actress. The film was coproduced with France where it was released as Joyeux Noël, bonne année.

== Cast ==
- Virna Lisi as Elvira
- Michel Serrault as Gino
- Consuelo Ferrara as Patrizia
- Paolo Graziosi as Pietro
- Tiziana Pini as Giannina
- Mattia Sbragia as Giorgio
- Francesca Neri as the girl in the pullman

== See also ==
- List of Christmas films
- List of Italian films of 1989
