= Guardians of the Clouds =

- Directed by: Luciano Odorisio
- Written by: Angelo Cannavacciuolo; Luciano Odorisio
- Based on: the novel Guardiani delle nuvole by Angelo Cannavacciuolo
- Produced by: Giorgio Heller
- Starring: Alessandro Gassmann; Franco Nero
- Cinematography: Romano Albani
- Music by: Ennio Morricone
- Release date: 2004
- Language: Italian

Guardians of the Clouds (Italian: Guardiani delle nuvole) is a 2004 Italian drama film written and directed by Luciano Odorisio and starring Alessandro Gassmann, Franco Nero and Anna Galiena. It won the Golden Pyramid at the 28th Cairo International Film Festival.

== Cast ==
- Alessandro Gassmann as Batino
- Franco Nero as The Father
- Anna Galiena as Donna Maddalena
- Claudia Gerini as Nannina
- Leo Gullotta as La Rocca
- Sergio Sivori as Costantino
- Sergio Assisi as Crescenzo
- Luisa Ranieri

== See also ==
- List of Italian films of 2004
