= Valentina Cortese =

Italian actress (1923–2019)

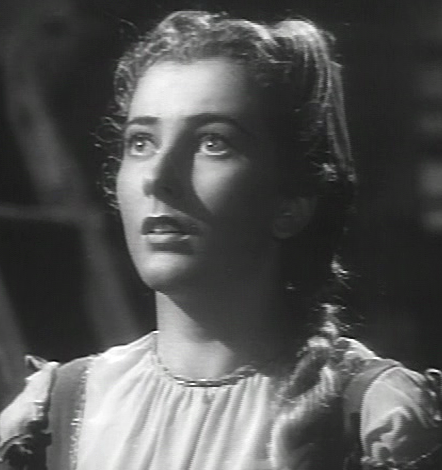
- Cortese in The Jester's Supper (1942)
- Born: Valentina Elena Cortese Rossi di Coenzo; 1 January 1923; Milan, Kingdom of Italy
- Died: 10 July 2019 (aged 96); Milan, Italy
- Other name: Valentina Cortesa
- Occupation: Actress
- Years active: 1941–1993
- Spouses: Richard Basehart (m. 1951; div. 1960); Carlo de Angeli (m. 1980; died 1998)
- Children: Jackie Basehart

Valentina Elena Cortese Rossi di Coenzo (1 January 1923 – 10 July 2019), sometimes credited as Valentina Cortesa, was an Italian film and theatre actress. Her screen career spanned over 100 productions across over five decades, from 1941 until 1993. Cortese won the BAFTA Award for Best Actress in a Supporting Role, and was nominated for both an Academy Award and a Golden Globe for her performance in the film Day for Night (1973). In 2013, she received the French Order of Arts and Letters.

Over the course of her career, Cortese worked with many important Italian and international directors, including Michelangelo Antonioni, Federico Fellini, Franco Zeffirelli, François Truffaut, Joseph L. Mankiewicz and Terry Gilliam. She was also active on stage, particularly in the company of Giorgio Strehler. Critic Morando Morandini described her as "one of the last divas of Italian theatre.... a mix of floral liberty, subdued decadence, belated D'Annunzio-ism and neurotic modern sensibility."

== Early years ==
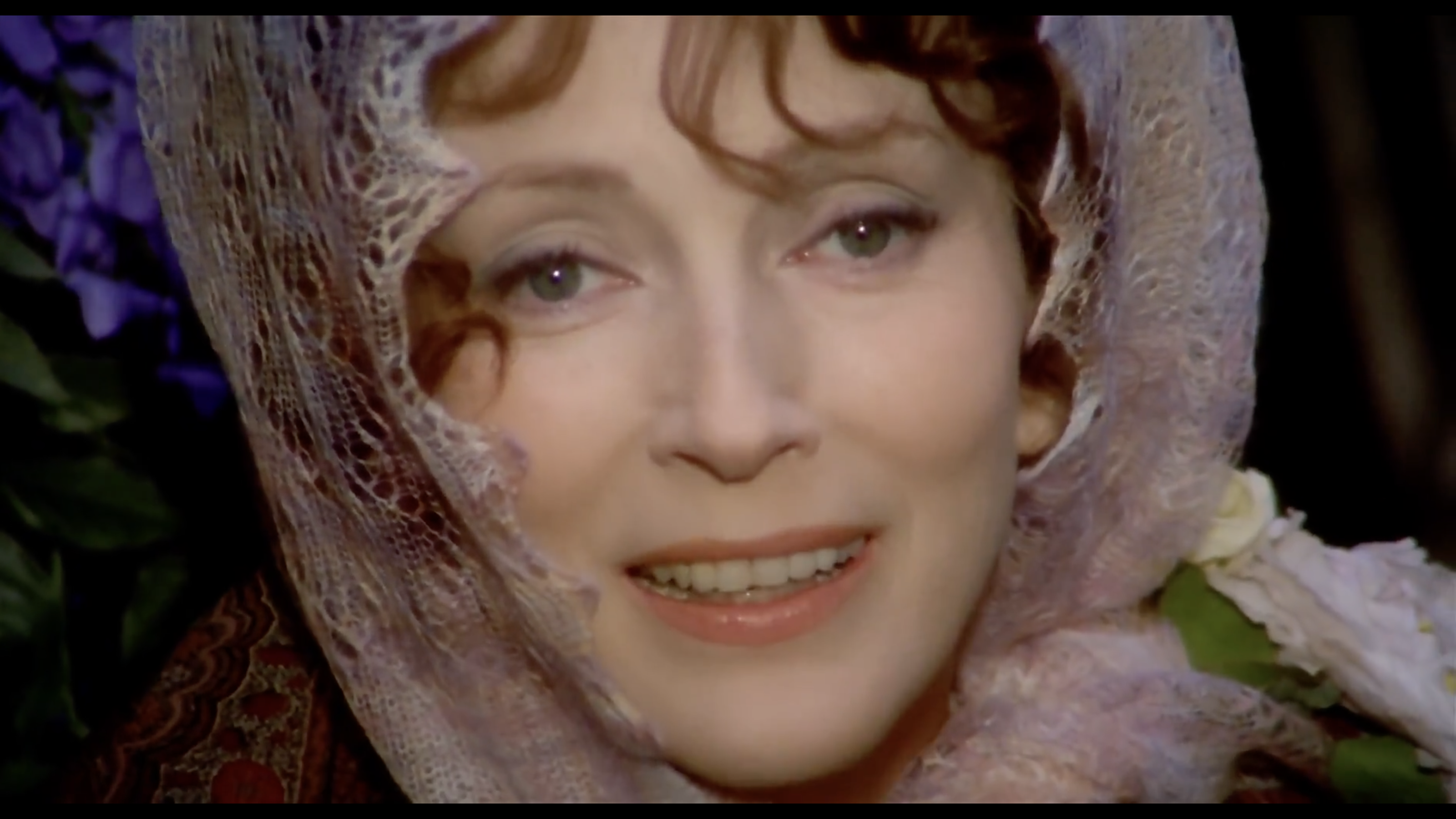
Cortese in Appassionata (1974)

Cortese was born on New Year's Day in Milan. Her parents were Olga Cortese and Napoleone Rossi di Coenzo, of noble origins. Cortese's father abandoned her mother shortly before her birth, and she was raised by her mother in the countryside, before being sent to Turin to live with her maternal grandparents in 1930.

After meeting conductor Victor de Sabata in 1940, then married with children and 31 years her senior, she quit high school and followed him to Rome, where she enrolled at (and later graduated from) the National Academy of Dramatic Arts (Accademia d'arte drammatica).

== Career ==
She first appeared on stage before receiving a contract at Scalera Film in 1941 and giving her film debut with a small role in L'orizzonte dipinto.

Cortese's first important film roles were in Roma Città Libera (1946), Les Misérables and The Wandering Jew (both 1948). 1948 also saw the end of her relationship with de Sabata. Her appearance in the British production The Glass Mountain (1949) led to numerous roles in international productions, including Jules Dassin's Thieves' Highway (1949), chosen by her then-partner Dassin over the originally cast Shelley Winters, and Robert Wise's The House on Telegraph Hill (1951). In 1951, she married her co-star on The House on Telegraph Hill Richard Basehart, with whom she returned to Italy. Cortese continued to appear in national and international productions; the most notable of this era include Joseph Mankiewicz's The Barefoot Contessa (1954) and Michelangelo Antonioni's Le Amiche (1955). For the latter, she received the Nastro d'Argento for Best Supporting Actress.

In 1960, Cortese and Basehart divorced, and Basehart returned to the US, leaving in her custody their only child, Jackie. In the following years, she worked for directors as diverse as Mario Bava (The Girl Who Knew Too Much, 1963), Bernhard Wicki (The Visit, 1964), Federico Fellini (Juliet of the Spirits, 1965), Robert Aldrich (The Legend of Lylah Clare, 1968) and Joseph Losey (The Assassination of Trotsky, 1972). For her performance in François Truffaut's Day for Night (1973) she received the BAFTA Award, the National Society of Film Critics Award and the New York Film Critics Circle Award, and was nominated for the Academy Award which ultimately went to Ingrid Bergman. In her acceptance speech, Bergman remarked that she felt Cortese should have won the award.

While her later films were mostly of lesser artistic interest, Cortese was continuously successful on stage, working with Giorgio Strehler, with whom she had a long-lasting relationship, Franco Zeffirelli, Luchino Visconti and Patrice Chéreau. In 1980, she married industrialist Carlo De Angeli. Her last film was Zeffirelli's 1993 Sparrow.

In 2017, Francesco Patierno documented her life in the film Diva!, based on her 2012 autobiography Quanti sono i domani passati ("How many tomorrows have gone by").

== Death ==
Cortese died on 10 July 2019, aged 96.

== Filmography ==
=== Features ===
Year	Title	Role	Notes
1941	L'orizzonte dipinto		
1941	The Actor Who Disappeared		
1941	The Hero of Venice	Alina	
1941	First Love	Nerina Redi	
1942	Girl of the Golden West	Madge / Juanita	
1942	The Jester's Supper	Lisabetta	
1942	The Queen of Navarre	Eleonora d'Austria	
1942	Soltanto un bacio	Maria Renda / Luisa Renda	
1942	Orizzonte di sangue	Lidia	
1942	Fourth Page	Valentina	
1942	Happy Days	Marianna	
1943	4 ragazze sognano	Enrichetta Dorlence	
1943	La carica degli eroi		
1945	No Turning Back	Valentina	
1945	The Ten Commandments		Segment: “Non nominare il nome di Dio invano”
1945	Chi l'ha visto?	Luisella	
1946	Rome, Free City	La ragazza	
1946	A Yank in Rome	Maria / La maestrina	
1947	Bullet for Stefano	Barbara	
1947	The Courier of the King	Louise de Renal	
1948	Les Misérables	Fantine / Cosette	
1948	The Wandering Jew	Esther	
1948	Crossroads of Passion	Maria Pilar	
1949	The Glass Mountain	Alida	
1949	Black Magic	Zoraida	
1949	Thieves' Highway	Rica	
1949	Malaya	Luana	
1950	Women Without Names	Anna Petrovic	
1950	Shadow of the Eagle	Elizabeth, Princess Tarakanova	
1951	The Rival of the Empress	Principessa Tarakanova	
1951	The House on Telegraph Hill	Victoria Kowelska	
1952	Secret People	Maria	
1953	Lulu	Lulù	
1953	Jealousy	Agrippina	Voice, Uncredited
1953	The Walk	Lisa	
1954	Angels of Darkness	Vally	
1954	Marriage	Natalia Stefanovna Chubukova	
1954	Avanzi di galera	Moglie di Luprandi	
1954	The Barefoot Contessa	Eleanora Torlato-Favrini	
1955	Adriana Lecouvreur	Adriana Lecouvreur	
1955	Le Amiche	Nene	
1955	Il conte Aquila	Teresa Casati	
1956	Faccia da mascalzone		
1956	Magic Fire	Mathilde Wesendonk	
1956	The Rocket from Calabuch	Eloisa	
1957	Dimentica il mio passato		
1957	Kean: Genius or Scoundrel	Fanny	Uncredited
1958	Amore a prima vista	—	
1958	Love and Troubles	Marisa	
1961	Square of Violence	Erica Bernardi	
1961	Barabbas	Julia	
1962	Axel Munthe, The Doctor of San Michele	Eleonora Duse	
1963	The Girl Who Knew Too Much	Laura Craven-Torrani	
1964	The Visit	Mathilda Miller	
1965	The Possessed	Irma	
1965	Juliet of the Spirits	Valentina	
1966	Black Sun	Maria	
1968	The Legend of Lylah Clare	Countess Bozo Bedoni	
1968	Listen, Let's Make Love	Lallo's Mother	
1968	Oh, Grandmother's Dead	Ornella	
1969	The Secret of Santa Vittoria	Gabriella	Uncredited
1970	Give Her the Moon	Madeleine de Lépine	
1970	First Love	Mother	
1970	The Love Mates	Eva	
1971	The Boat on the Grass	Christine	
1971	The Iguana with the Tongue of Fire	Mrs. Sobiesky	
1972	Chronicle of a Homicide	Luisa Sola	
1972	Brother Sun, Sister Moon	Pica di Bernardone	
1972	The Assassination of Trotsky	Natalia Sedova Trotsky	
1973	Day for Night	Séverine	
1974	Appassionata	Elisa Rutelli	
1974	Tendre Dracula		Uncredited
1974	The Kiss of Death	Elizabeth Blixen	
1974	Don't Hurt Me, My Love	Sabina Foschini	
1975	Dracula in the Provinces	Olghina Franchetti	
1975	Kidnap Syndicate	Grazia Filippini	
1975	Son tornate a fiorire le rose	Sabina Foschini	
1976	Nick the Sting	Regina, Nick's mother	
1976	The Big Operator	The Widow	
1977	Nido de viudas	Dolores	
1978	Tanto va la gatta al lardo...	Vilma / Leonilde Bosco Casagrande	
1979	Satan's Wife	Elena Merrill	
1980	When Time Ran Out	Rose Valdez	
1982	La ferdinanda: Sonate für eine Medici-Villa	Caterina de Dominicis	
1987	Monte Napoleone	Madre di Guido	
1987	Tango blu	Rachele Cigno	
1988	Young Toscanini		Uncredited
1988	The Adventures of Baron Munchausen	Queen Ariadne / Violet	
1991	Buster's Bedroom	Serafina Tannenbaum	
1993	Sparrow	Mother Superior	Final film role

=== Partial Television Credits ===
Year	Title	Role	Notes
1977	Jesus of Nazareth	Herodias	
