= Chronicle of a Homicide =

1972 Italian film

- Spanish film poster
- Directed by: Mauro Bolognini
- Written by: Ugo Pirro; Ugo Liberatore
- Starring: Massimo Ranieri; Martin Balsam; Valentina Cortese
- Cinematography: Giuseppe Ruzzolini
- Edited by: Nino Baragli
- Music by: Ennio Morricone
- Production company: Documento Film
- Distributed by: Titanus
- Release date: 1972
- Running time: 105 minutes
- Language: Italian

Chronicle of a Homicide (Italian: Imputazione di omicidio per uno studente, lit. 'Homicide charge against a student') is a 1972 Italian crime-drama film directed by Mauro Bolognini.

== Cast ==
- Massimo Ranieri: Fabio Sola
- Martin Balsam: Judge Aldo Sola
- Valentina Cortese: Luisa Sola
- Turi Ferro: Inspector Malacarne
- Pino Colizzi: Inspector Alberto Cottone
- Salvo Randone: Attorney general
- Luigi Diberti: Massimo Trotti
- Mariano Rigillo: Luca Binda
- Massimo Sarchielli: Giuseppe
- Piero Gerlini: Marcello
