= Rina Franchetti =

Italian actress (1907–2010)

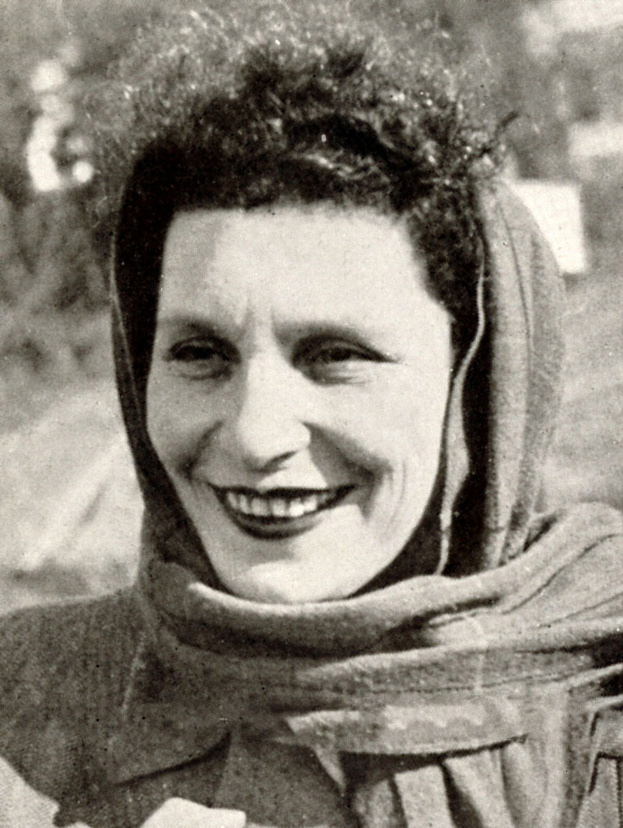
- Franchetti in 1954
- Born: 23 December 1907; Naples, Kingdom of Italy
- Died: 18 August 2010 (aged 102); Formello, Rome, Italy
- Occupation: Actress
- Years active: 1932–1990

Rina Franchetti (23 December 1907 – 18 August 2010) was an Italian film actress. She appeared in 50 films between 1932 and 1990.

== Selected filmography ==
- Two Happy Hearts (1932)
- Everybody's Secretary (1933)
- The Peddler and the Lady (1943)
- Women and Brigands (1950)
- The Wayward Wife (1953)
- The Steel Rope (1953)
- The White Angel (1955)
- Atom Age Vampire (1963)
- Three Nights of Love (1964)
- Gunman Sent by God (1968)
- Italian Graffiti (1973)
- Somewhere Beyond Love (1974)
- My Father's Private Secretary (1976)
