= Good Girls Don't Wear Trousers =

1989 novel by Lara Cardella

- Author: Lara Cardella
- Original title: Volevo i pantaloni
- Language: English
- Publisher: Mondadori, Arcade Publishing
- Publication date: 1989
- English publication date: 1994
- Media type: Print
- Pages: 118 pages
- ISBN: 155970263X

Good Girls Don't Wear Trousers (Italian: Volevo i pantaloni) is an autobiographical novel by Lara Cardella. It was published by Mondadori in 1989, when the author was only 19.

The novel, which tells the plight of a teenager forced into the mental and cultural restrictions of Sicily in the 1980s, achieved unexpected success. It became a social phenomenon and was translated into several languages.

In 1990, the book was adapted into a film with the same name directed by Maurizio Ponzi. In 1995, Cardella wrote a sequel to the book, entitled Volevo i pantaloni 2.

On the twentieth anniversary of the first publication in 2009, Mondadori published a new edition of the book which included a previously unpublished interview with the author.
