= Not with My Wife, You Don't! =

1966 film by Norman Panama

- Theatrical release poster
- Directed by: Norman Panama
- Screenplay by: Norman Panama; Larry Gelbart; Peter Barnes
- Story by: Norman Panama; Melvin Frank
- Produced by: Norman Panama
- Starring: Tony Curtis; Virna Lisi; George C. Scott; Richard Eastham
- Cinematography: Charles Lang
- Edited by: Aaron Stell
- Music by: John Williams; Johnny Mercer
- Production companies: Fernwood Productions; Reynard Productions
- Distributed by: Warner Bros. Pictures
- Release date: November 2, 1966
- Running time: 119 minutes
- Country: United States
- Language: English

Not with My Wife, You Don't! (stylized as Not with MY Wife, You Don't!) is a 1966 American comedy film starring Tony Curtis, Virna Lisi and George C. Scott. The film was nominated for a Golden Globe for Best Motion Picture – Musical/Comedy. The plot follows the standard storyline of the long-running "road movies" popularized by Bob Hope, Bing Crosby and Dorothy Lamour, also products of the Norman Panama-Melvin Frank writing team. (Note: Norman Panama collaborated with a former schoolfriend, Melvin Frank to form a writing partnership which endured for three decades.)

The opening title sequence and interior sequences with an animated green monster were created by Saul Bass.

== Plot ==
During the Korean War, Italian nurse Lieutenant Julietta Perodi (Virna Lisi), who has a passion of everything in "twos", falls in love with two United States Air Force pilots, Col. Tom Ferris (Tony Curtis) and Col. "Tank" Martin (George C. Scott). "Julie" marries Ferris after he convinces her that his friend, "Tank" has been killed in an aircraft crash. She soon discovers that Martin is alive, but remains happily married to Ferris until, Martin, her former love, re-enters their lives 14 years later.

London-based Ferris, now a military attache assigned to looking after military "brass", especially General Parker (Carroll O'Connor) has been neglectful of his wife. When Martin uses his influence to have Ferris shipped to Labrador for an Arctic survival course, she is prepared to seek a divorce. In the guise of an Arab potentate, Ferris steals a V.I.P jet and wings it to Rome (which includes flying the jet through the London Tower Bridge along the route) to reconcile with his wife. Martin really wants to keep his single lifestyle, and can't see himself as the "marrying kind." Two years later, with their marriage on firmer grounds, the Ferris family has twin boys while Ferris continues making life easy for military V.I.P.'s, including the newly appointed Brig. Gen. Tank Martin, who is now flying with the United States Air Force Thunderbirds air demonstration team.

== Cast ==
As appearing in screen credits (main roles identified):

- Tony Curtis as Colonel Tom Ferris
- Virna Lisi as Julie Ferris / Lieutenant Julietta Perodi
- George C. Scott as Colonel "Tank" Martin
- Carroll O'Connor as General Parker
- Richard Eastham as General Walters
- Eddie Ryder as Sergeant Gilroy
- George Tyne as Sergeant Dogerty
- Ann Doran as Doris Parker
- Donna Danton as Nurse Sally Ann
- Natalie Core as Lillian Walters
- Buck Young as Air Police Colonel
- Maurice Dallimore as BBC Commentator

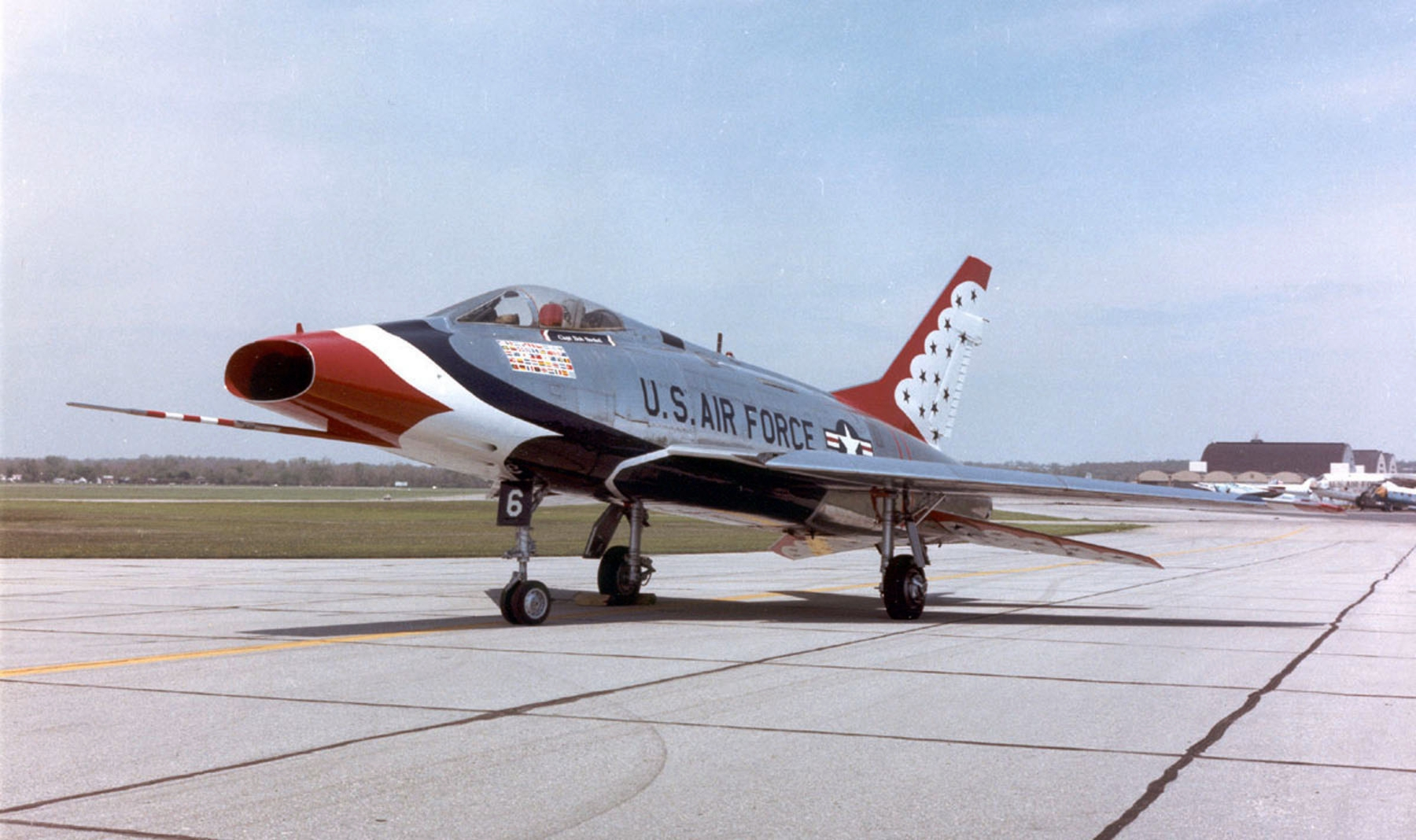
The North American F-100D Super Sabre serving with the Thunderbirds air demonstration team.

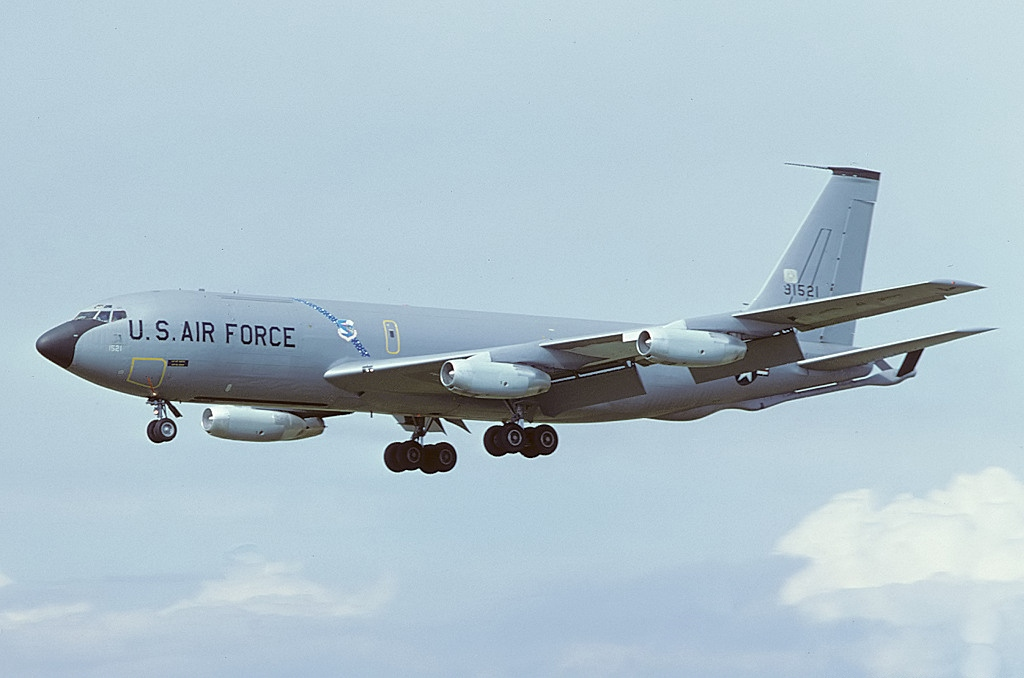
The Strategic Air Command Boeing KC-135 Stratotanker which served as a military-transport aircraft used by both General Parker and Lieutenant Colonel Ferris in the film.

== Production ==
Filmed with the full cooperation of the United States Air Force, scenes of contemporary North American F-86 Sabre and North American F-100 Super Sabre fighters are shot in Technicolor. Principal photography took place in Labrador, Canada, London, Rome and Lazio, Italy, as well as in Washington, District of Columbia.

The writing team of Panama and Frank were basically reprising the successful road pictures formula that had worked well with Hope, Crosby and Lamour with Curtis, Scott and Lisi now taking on the similar roles in a "limp service comedy" as Scott's biographer, David Sheward characterized the slight film. Essentially, the road picture had now moved into the air. The team of Peter Barnes and Larry Gelbart were brought in as screenwriters/ "doctors", but the plot line remained sophomoric. Panama resorted to a hodge-podge of effects, ranging from animated cartoons, to clips from foreign films and Mighty Joe Young with Bob Hope making a cameo appearance, which further accentuated the slapstick nature of the farce. Curtis later commented that he felt that casting had always remained an issue, as he was better suited to playing the "wolf" rather than the more passive character of the besieged husband.

== Reception ==
Considered an amicable comedy typical of the period, critics like Bosley Crowther of The New York Times gave Not with My Wife, You Don't! a sympathetic review. "It is, nevertheless, the kind of farce that will someday look like a couple of million dollars in the context of the small screen's regular programing. It has been beautifully photographed in Technicolor and it has a competent cast headed by Tony Curtis, Virna Lisi and George C. Scott. And, on the small screen, its gags and situations may seem almost Shavian."

Variety saw a great deal in the film's lightweight premise, "Zesty scripting, fine performances, solid direction and strong production values sustain hilarity throughout."

== Awards ==
Not with My Wife, You Don't! was nominated for the 1967 Golden Globe in the category of Best Motion Picture – Musical/Comedy.

== Paperback novelization ==
Releasing it slightly in advance of the film (per normal for the era), Popular Library published a novelization of the screenplay, by Evan Lee Heyman, the author of several notable novelizations of the 1960s. Atypically, the book does not credit the source screenplay (allowing one to infer, incorrectly, that the novel came first), but the 1966 copyright is assigned to Warner Bros. Pictures.

== See also ==
- List of American films of 1966
