= Virna Lisi =

Italian actress (1936–2014)

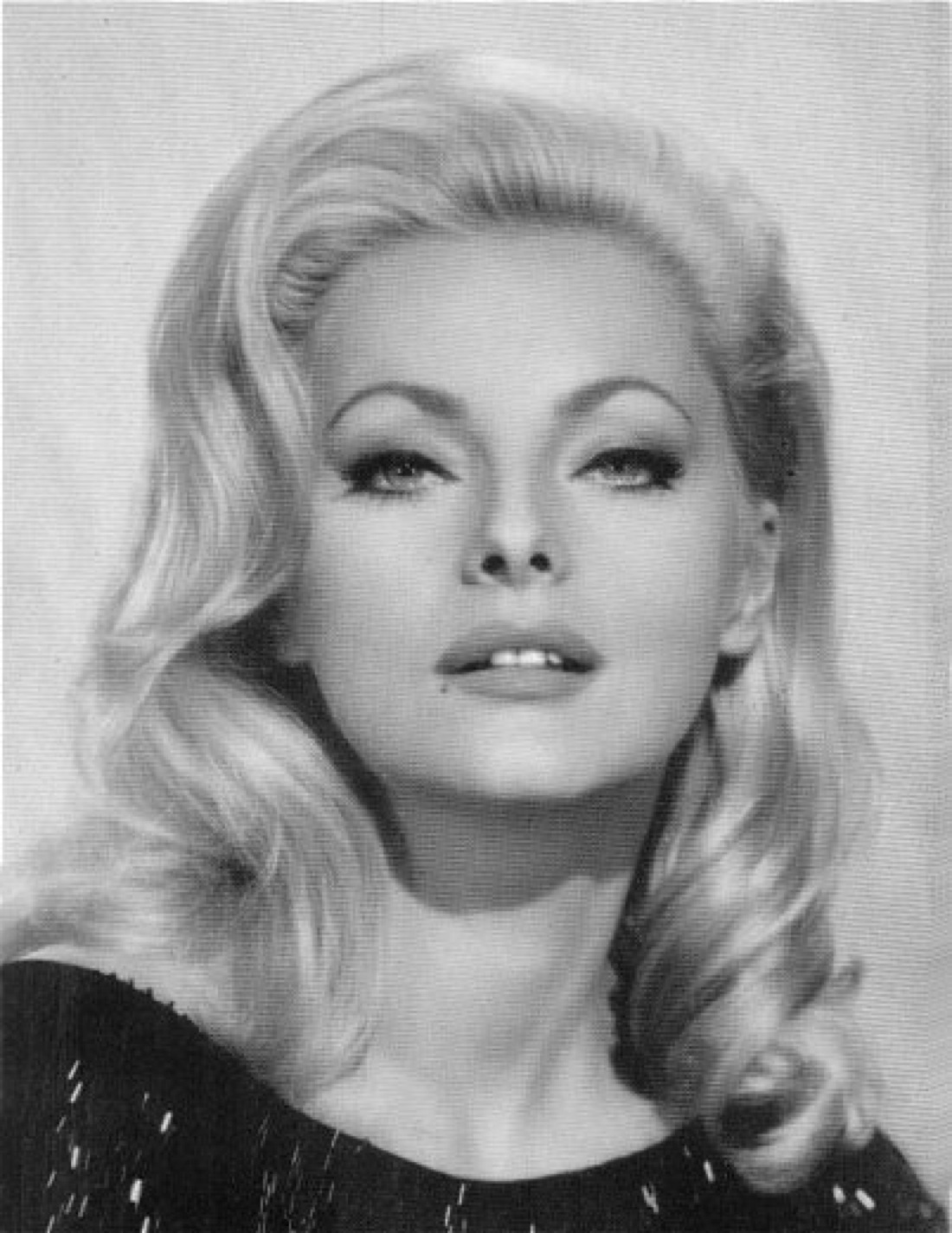
- Lisi c.1960s
- Born: Virna Lisa Pieralisi; 8 November 1936; Ancona, Kingdom of Italy
- Died: 18 December 2014 (aged 78); Rome, Italy
- Occupation: Actress
- Years active: 1953–2014
- Spouse: Franco Pesci (m. 1960; died 2013)
- Children: 1

Virna Lisa Pieralisi (Italian: [ˈvirna pjeraˈliːzi]; 8 November 1936 – 18 December 2014), known as just Virna Lisi, was an Italian actress. Her international film appearances included How to Murder Your Wife (1965), Not with My Wife, You Don't! (1966), The Secret of Santa Vittoria (1969), Beyond Good and Evil (1977), and Follow Your Heart (1996). For the 1994 film La Reine Margot, she won Best Actress at Cannes and the César Award for Best Supporting Actress.

== Career ==
=== Early career ===
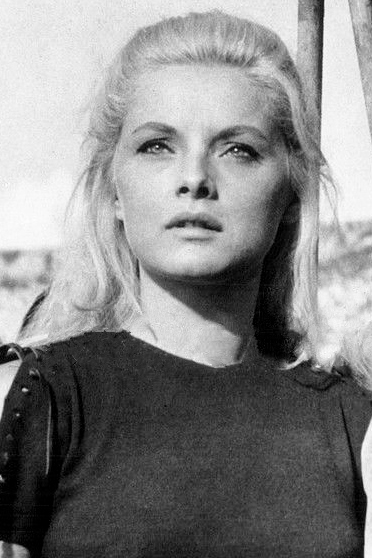
Lisi in Duel of the Titans (1961)

Born in Ancona, Lisi began her film career in her teens. Discovered in Rome by two Neapolitan producers, Antonio Ferrigno and Ettore Pesce, she debuted in La corda d'acciaio (The Steel Rope, 1953). Initially, she appeared in musical films like E Napoli canta (Naples Sings, 1953) and Questa è la vita (Of Life and Love, 1954, with Totò). While initially cast in roles highlighting her physical appearance, such as Le diciottenni (Eighteen Year Olds) and Lo scapolo (The Bachelor), both released in 1955, she went on to more demanding roles, particularly in The Doll That Took the Town (1956), Eva (1962), and the spectacle Duel of the Titans (1961).

In the late 1950s, Lisi performed on stage at Piccolo Teatro di Milano in I giacobini by Federico Zardi under the direction of Giorgio Strehler. During the 1960s, Lisi appeared in comedies and participated in television dramas that were widely viewed in Italy. Lisi also promoted a toothpaste brand on television with a slogan that would become a catchphrase among Italians: "con quella bocca può dire ciò che vuole" (with such a mouth, she can say whatever she wants).

=== Hollywood career ===
Though she turned down the Tatiana Romanova role in From Russia with Love (1963), Hollywood producers sought a new Marilyn Monroe and so, Lisi debuted in Hollywood comedy as a green-eyed blonde temptress with Jack Lemmon in How to Murder Your Wife (1965) and appeared with Tony Curtis in Not with My Wife, You Don't! (1966). Lisi then starred with Frank Sinatra, in Assault on a Queen (1966), in The Girl and the General, co-starring with Rod Steiger, and in two films with Anthony Quinn, The Secret of Santa Vittoria, directed by Stanley Kramer, and the war drama The 25th Hour. In 1969 she did a cameo appearance in If It's Tuesday, This Must Be Belgium. In the 80s she played in two American movies, Miss Right and I Love N.Y.. She garnered attention for a photo of her 'shaving' her face that appeared on the March 1965 cover of Esquire magazine. In 1968 she turned down the role of Barbarella because she was not interested in a sexualized role

=== Later career in Europe ===
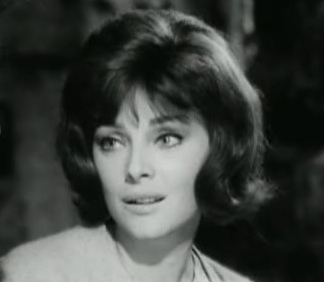
Lisi in The Birds, the Bees and the Italians (1966)

To overcome her typecasting playing seductresses, Lisi sought new types of roles, of evil women or of a lover in relationships of disparate age for example. In those years, she participated in Italian productions, in Casanova 70 and Le bambole (1965), Arabella (1967), and Le dolci signore (1968). She turned down the part played by Jane Fonda in Roger Vadim's Barbarella (1968). Lisi also starred in The Birds, the Bees and the Italians (1966) which shared the Grand Prix (then equivalent to the Palme d'Or, which was not awarded at the time) with A Man and a Woman at the Cannes Film Festival that year.

She told The New York Sunday Times that after marrying Franco Pesci, an Italian builder and architect, she briefly retired from acting in the early 1970s to spend more time with her husband and their son, Corrado. Nonetheless, Lisi's career underwent a renaissance with a number of projects, including Beyond Good and Evil (1977), Ernesto (1979), and The Cricket (1980). For the film La Reine Margot (1994), Lisi's portrayal of Catherine de' Medici won her both the César and Cannes Film Festival awards, along with a Silver Ribbon for Best Supporting Actress. In 2002, Lisi starred in The Best Day of My Life. Lisi then participated in many sitcoms and TV series. Her last movie was in the Italian comedy drama Latin Lover in 2014, shortly before her death.

== Personal life and death ==
She was married to Franco Pesci, an Italian property developer and architect. They were married for 53 years until his death, a year before her. After her marriage she briefly retired from acting, saying: "My husband was not very happy about my career, Franco is a jealous man — thank God! After we married he tried to take me away from all this movie business." She said he eventually relented.

On 18 December 2014, Lisi died of lung cancer in Rome at age 78. She is survived by a son, Corrado Pesci, and three grandchildren.

== Legacy ==
The Argentinian band Sumo (led by Luca Prodan) made a song for her, "TV Caliente a.k.a. Virna Lisi" (1986), composed by Luca Prodan, whose brother, the actor Andrea Prodan, appeared with her in the movie I ragazzi di via Panisperna (1988). A Brazilian rock band named Virna Lisi (1989–1997) was named after her. Meilland International SA named a rose after her in 1989.

== Filmography ==
Year	Film	Role	Notes
1953	Naples Sings	Maria Mariani	
1954	Desiderio 'e sole	Laura	
1954	Violenza sul lago	Laura, Marco's daughter	
1954	Letter from Naples	Anna Esposito	
1954	The Steel Rope	Stella	
1954	Cardinal Lambertini	Maria di Pietramelara	
1954	The Courier of Moncenisio	Jeanne Thibaud	
1954	Piccola santa	Maria	
1955	Eighteen Year Olds	Maria Rovani	
1955	Addio Napoli!		
1955	New Moon	Lucia	
1955	Disowned		
1955	La rossa	Maria	
1955	Les Hussards	Elisa	
1955	The Bachelor	Extra	Uncredited
1956	Vendicata!		
1957	The Doll That Took the Town (The Woman of the Day)	Liliana Attenni	
1958	Il Conte di Matera	Greta Tramontana, Rambaldo's daughter	
1958	Toto, Peppino and the Fanatics	Girl	
1959	Vite perdute	Anna	
1959	Il padrone delle ferriere	Claire de Beaulieu	
1959	World of Miracles	Laura Damiani	
1959	Caterina Sforza, la leonessa di Romagna	Caterina Sforza	
1960	Un militare e mezzo	Anita Rossi	
1961	Sua Eccellenza si fermò a mangiare	Silvia	
1961	5 marines per 100 ragazze	Grazia	
1961	Duel of the Titans	Julia	
1962	Eva	Francesca Ferrara	
1963	The Shortest Day	Naja, an Austrian spy	
1963	Don't Tempt the Devil	Gina Bianchi	
1964	The Black Tulip	Caroline "Caro" Plantin	
1964	Coplan Takes Risks	Ingrid Carlsen	
1965	How to Murder Your Wife	Mrs. Ford	
1965	The Dolls	Luisa	(segment "La telefonata")
1965	The Possessed	Tilde	
1965	Casanova 70	Gigliola	
1965	Made in Italy	Virginia	(segment "3 'La Donna', episode 1")
1965	Kiss the Other Sheik	Dorothea	(segment "L'ora di punta"), also known as The Man, the Woman and the Money
1966	The Birds, the Bees and the Italians	Milena Zulian	
1966	A Maiden for a Prince	Giulia	
1966	Assault on a Queen	Rosa Lucchesi	
1966	Not with My Wife, You Don't!	Julie Ferris / Lieutenant Julietta Perodi	
1967	The 25th Hour	Suzanna Moritz	
1967	The Girl and the General	Ada	
1967	Arabella	Arabella	
1967	Anyone Can Play	Luisa	
1968	The Girl Who Couldn't Say No	Yolanda	Nominated—Nastro d'Argento for Best Actress
1968	Better a Widow	Rosa Minniti	
1969	If It's Tuesday, This Must Be Belgium	John's Beautiful Cousin in Rome	
1969	The Christmas Tree	Catherine Graziani	
1969	The Secret of Santa Vittoria	Caterina Malatesta	
1970	Le Temps des loups	Stella Monzoni	
1970	The Voyeur	Claude	
1971	The Statue	Rhonda Bolt	
1971	Love Me Strangely	Nathalie Revent	
1971	Roma Bene	Duchess Silvia Santi	
1972	The Pebbles of Étretat	Alny	
1972	Bluebeard	Elga	
1973	Night Flight from Moscow	Annabel Lee	
1973	White Fang	Sister Evangelina	
1974	Challenge to White Fang	Sister Evangelina	
1977	Beyond Good and Evil	Elisabeth Nietzsche	Nastro d'Argento for Best Supporting Actress; Golden Grolla for Best Actress
1979	Ernesto	Ernesto's Mother	
1979	Bugie bianche	Luisa Herrighe	
1980	The Cricket	Wilma Malinverni	David di Donatello for Best Actress; Golden Grolla for Best Actress
1982	Miss Right	Anna	
1983	Time for Loving	Adriana Balestra	David di Donatello for Best Supporting Actress; Nastro d'Argento for Best Supporting Actress
1984	Amarsi un po'	Princess Marisa Cellini	
1987	I Love N.Y.	Anna Cotone	
1989	I ragazzi di via Panisperna (Via Panisperna Boys)	Ettore Majorana's Mother	
1989	Merry Christmas... Happy New Year	Elvira	Nastro d'Argento for Best Actress; Nominated—David di Donatello for Best Actress
1994	La Reine Margot	Catherine de Medici	Cannes Film Festival Best Actress Award; Nastro d'Argento for Best Supporting Actress; César Award for Best Supporting Actress; Nominated—David di Donatello for Best Supporting Actress
1995	One Hundred and One Nights	Herself – in Cannes	
1996	Follow Your Heart	Olga	Nastro d'Argento for Best Actress; Italian Golden Globe for Best Actress; Nominated—David di Donatello for Best Actress
2002	The Best Day of My Life	Irene	Nastro d'Argento for Best Supporting Actress; Flaiano Prize for Best Actress – Audience Award
2015	Latin Lover	Rita	Posthumous; Nominated—David di Donatello for Best Actress; Nominated—Italian Golden Globe for Best Actress

== Television ==
- Orgoglio e pregiudizio (television miniseries - 5 episodes) (1957) as Elizabeth Bennett
- Cenerentola (1961) as Cindarella
- Il caso Maurizius (1961)
- Una tragedia americana (1962) as Sondra Finchley
- Christopher Columbus (1985) as Dona Moniz Perestrello
- Uno di noi (1996)
- Desert of Fire (1997) as Christine Duvivier
- Balzac (1999) as Laure de Berny
- Rock Crystal (1999) as Sanna
- Le ali della vita (2000) as Sorella Alberta
- Piccolo mondo antico (2001) as Marchesa Orsola
- Il bello delle donne (2001) as Contessa Miranda Spadoni
- Caterina e le sue figlie (2005–2010) as Caterina
- L'onore e il rispetto (2006) as Ersilia Fortebracci

== Awards ==
David di Donatello
Best Actress
1980: The Cricket
Best Supporting Actress
1983: Time for Loving

Nastro d'Argento
Best Actress
1990: Merry Christmas... Happy New Year
1997: Follow Your Heart
Best Supporting Actress
1978: Beyond Good and Evil
1983: Time for Loving
1995: La Reine Margot
2002: The Best Day of My Life

César Award
Best Supporting Actress
1995: La Reine Margot

Cannes Film Festival
Best Actress
1994: La Reine Margot
