= The Kiss (1974 film) =

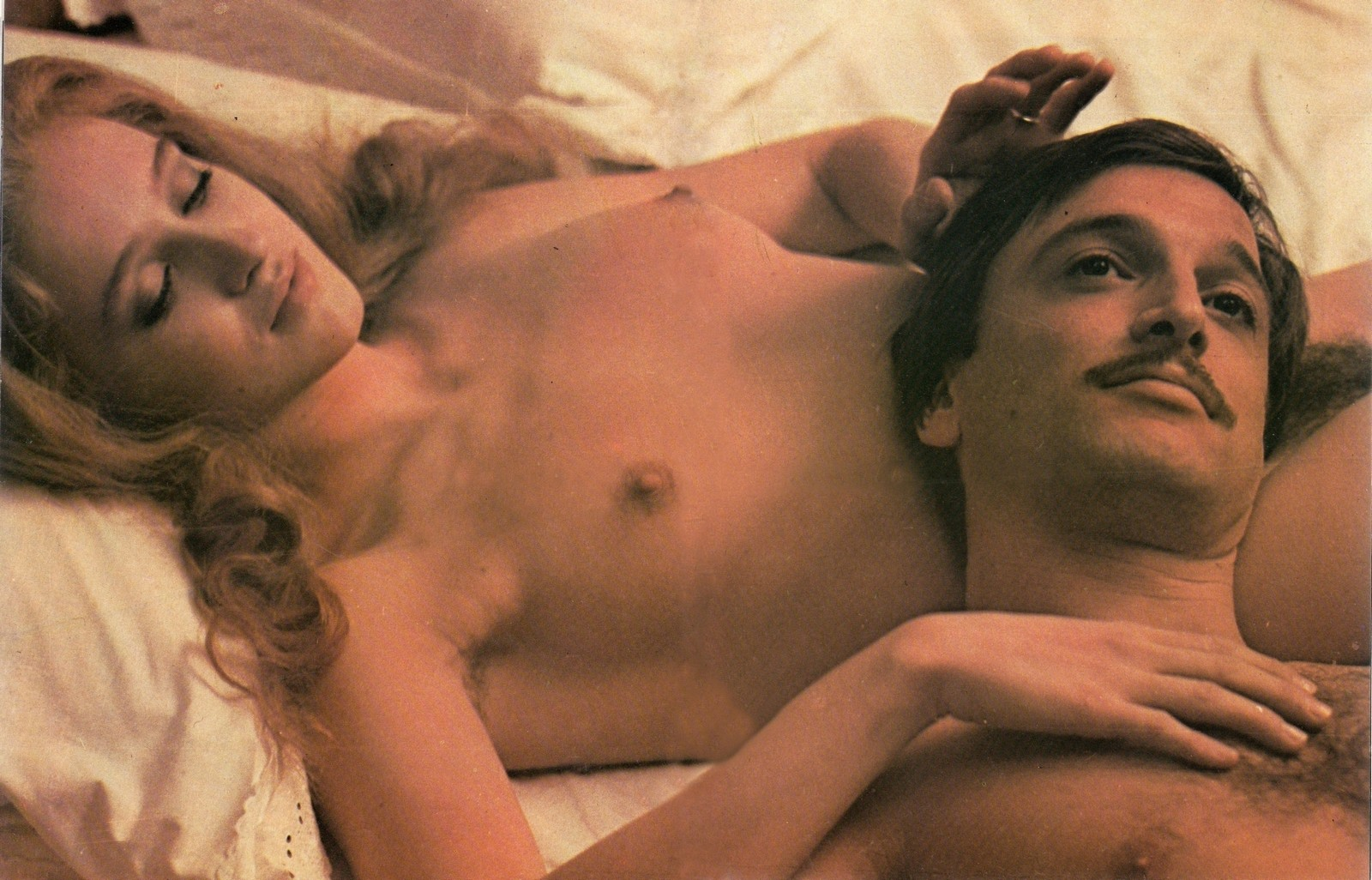
- Elena and Guido
- Directed by: Mario Lanfranchi
- Written by: Pupi Avati; Mario Lanfranchi
- Based on: Il bacio di una morta by Carolina Invernizio
- Starring: Maurizio Bonuglia; Eleonora Giorgi; Martine Beswick
- Cinematography: Claudio Collepiccolo
- Edited by: Luciano Anconetani
- Music by: Piero Piccioni
- Production company: InterVision
- Release date: 22 August 1974
- Running time: 90 minutes
- Country: Italy
- Language: Italian

The Kiss or The Kiss of Death (Italian: Il bacio) is a 1974 Italian historical drama film directed by Mario Lanfranchi and starring Maurizio Bonuglia, Eleonora Giorgi and Martine Beswick.

The film's sets were designed by the art director Giancarlo Bartolini Salimbeni. It was shot at the Elios Film Studios in Rome and on location in Venice.

== Plot ==
Countess Elena Rambaldi has an illegitimate brother, Alfonso, whom the elderly Count Rambaldi detests and has banished from the family home. The old Count dies of a heart attack the day he discovers Alfonso and his sister tenderly embracing. Elena, the sole heir to the family fortune, meets Guido by chance, falls in love with him, marries him—bestowing the family title upon him—and travels to Venice for their honeymoon. Amidst the city's ambiguous atmosphere, Guido is seduced and ensnared by the wicked dancer Nara, who is eager to get her hands on the Rambaldi title and wealth. Nara easily frames a clandestine meeting between Elena and Alfonso—who is about to leave for America—as adultery; she then attempts to poison the Countess right before the eyes of her husband, who is drugged and unaware. However, when Alfonso goes to give a final kiss to his sister—who has already been laid in her coffin—he discovers she is alive and brings her back to Venice. Guido begins to catch fleeting glimpses of the woman presumed dead; filled with remorse for his wrongdoing, he breaks away from Nara, who retaliates by taking him to court. The trial would end disastrously for the Count were it not for Elena herself appearing to unravel the mystery.

== Cast ==
- Maurizio Bonuglia as Guido Rambaldi
- Eleonora Giorgi as Elena Vergani - wife of Guido
- Martine Beswick as Nara Kotosky
- Valentina Cortese as Elizabeth Blixen
- Massimo Girotti as Eugenio Dazzi
- Brian Deacon as Alfonso - half-brother of Elena
- Vladek Sheybal as Portiere d'albergo
- Antonio Pierfederici
- Gianni Cavina as Gravedigger
- Barbara Vittoria Calori
- Franca Maresa
- Glauco Scarlini
- Luigi Zerbinati
- Giovanni Vannini as Doctor
- Vittorio Fanfoni as Lawyer of Nara
- Riccardo Berlingeri
- Gabriele Bentivoglio as Witness #1 at the duel
- Alessandro Perrella
- Corrado Annicelli
- Edoardo Toniolo
- Ines Pellegrini as Myosotis
- John Karlsen as Friedrich
- Antonio Spaccatini as Jeweller

== Bibliography ==
- Curti, Roberto (2017-09-21). Italian Gothic Horror Films, 1970-1979. McFarland. ISBN 978-1-4766-6469-9.
