= Lara Cardella =

Italian writer

Lara Cardella (born 13 November 1969 in Licata, Italy) is an Italian writer. She is best known for her best selling novel Good Girls Don't Wear Trousers.

== Career ==
Cardella's first book Good Girls Don't Wear Trousers (in Italian: Volevo i pantaloni), written when she was nineteen, caused a scandal in the small Sicilian community where she lived because it fiercely criticized what she perceived as the backwardness and chauvinism of contemporary Sicilian society. One commentator labeled her Italy's Salman Rushdie. The controversy surrounding the book, as well as the young age of its author, contributed to make it a huge bestseller in Italy and the novel was translated in many languages and published across the rest of Europe, in Brazil and Korea.

A film based on the novel, titled Volevo i pantaloni, came out in 1990.

In 1991 she wrote Intorno a Laura, a novel based on an original structure which combines the traditional novel structure and that of theatrical drama, showing she was able to experiment new solutions and themes.

Fedra se ne va and Una ragazza normale followed, in 1992 and 1994 respectively, but none of them matched the enormous success of her first book.

In 1995, perhaps in the effort of renewing her success as a writer, she wrote the sequel to her first novel: Volevo i pantaloni 2.

She then changed publisher, leaving Mondadori for Rizzoli. With this publisher she released Detesto il soft (1997), a dreamy novel centred on morbid sexuality, and Finestre accese (2000), her last novel so far, where the lives of the two main female characters are followed down the years through the entries in their personal journals and where Cardella addresses for the first time the theme of mafia.

== Themes ==
Through the years Cardella has experimented various styles and narrative solutions, from the traditional novel (Volevo i pantaloni, Una ragazza normale) to the contamination between novel and drama (Intorno a Laura), from the dreamlike atmospheres of Detesto il soft to the journal (Finestre accese). There are however some basic themes recurring in much of her work, as the main focus of the plot or lying under the surface, such as chauvinism, rape, the backward and negative aspects of Sicilian traditional society. In Una ragazza normale and Detesto il soft the subjects of sexuality and death are addressed in a fascinating morbid way. A general sense of pessimism and fatalism permeates much of her writings.

== Selected works ==
=== In English ===
- Good girls don't wear trousers, London, H.Hamilton, 1993

=== In Italian ===
- Finestre accese, Milan, Rizzoli, 2000
- Detesto il soft, Milan, Rizzoli, 1997
- Volevo i pantaloni 2, Milan, Mondadori, 1995
- Una ragazza normale, Milan, Mondadori, 1994
- Fedra se ne va, Milan, Mondadori, 1992
- Intorno a Laura, Milan, Mondadori, 1991
- Volevo i pantaloni, Milan, Mondadori, 1989
