= Massimo Ciavarro =

Italian actor

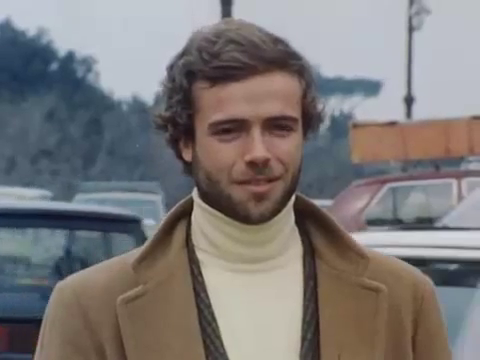
- Ciavarro in a movie still from 1987
- Born: 7 November 1957 (age 68); Rome, Italy
- Occupation: Actor

Massimo Ciavarro (born 7 November 1957) is an Italian actor and television personality.

== Biography ==
Born in Rome, Ciavarro started his career in 1972, as a fotoromanzi actor. He made his film debut in 1976, in the commedia sexy all'italiana Sorbola...che romagnola!, and was the star of a series of romantic comedy teen films in the first half of the 1980s. Since the 2000s he has focused his activities on television, appearing in TV series and on several reality shows, notably the sixth edition of L'Isola dei Famosi.

== Personal life ==
Ciavarro was married to actress Eleonora Giorgi from 1993 to 1996. They had a son, Paolo (born 1991).
