= Chiara Colizzi =

Italian voice actress

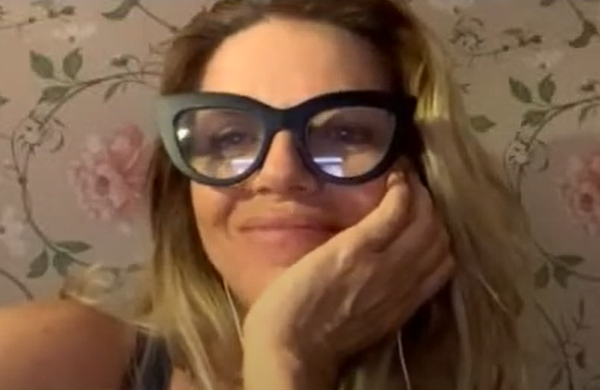
- Colizzi in 2023
- Born: 29 May 1968 (age 58); Rome, Italy
- Occupations: Voice actress; dubbing director
- Years active: 1990–present
- Children: 1
- Parents: Pino Colizzi (father); Manuela Andrei (mother)

Chiara Colizzi (born 29 May 1968) is an Italian voice actress.

== Biography ==
Colizzi is the official Italian voice of Nicole Kidman and Kate Winslet. She has also dubbed Emily Watson, Uma Thurman and Penélope Cruz in a majority of their work. In television roles, Colizzi provided the Italian voice of Elliot Reid (portrayed by Sarah Chalke) in Scrubs and she also dubbed Sarah Wayne Callies in Prison Break and The Walking Dead.

In animation, Colizzi dubbed Gloria in the Italian version of the Madagascar sequels as well as Princess Atta in A Bug's Life.

=== Personal life ===
Colizzi is the daughter of voice actors Pino Colizzi and Manuela Andrei. She also has one son.

== Voice work ==
| Year | Title | Role | Notes |
|---|---|---|---|
| 2003 | Little Bee Julia & Lady Life | Sara’s mother | Animated film |
| 2015 | Sissi: The Young Empress | Louise | Animated series |

=== Dubbing ===
==== Films (Animation, Italian dub) ====
| Year | Title | Role(s) | Ref |
|---|---|---|---|
| 1987 | The Chipmunk Adventure | Alvin Seville | |
| 1998 | A Bug's Life | Princess Atta | |
| 2000 | Titan A.E. | Akima Kunimoto | |
| 2001 | Recess: School's Out | Becky Detweiler | |
| 2003 | 101 Dalmatians II: Patch's London Adventure | Anita Radcliffe | |
| 2005 | Robots | Cappy | |
| 2006 | Barnyard | Daisy | |
| 2006 | Charlotte's Web | Charlotte | |
| 2006 | Azur & Asmar: The Princes' Quest | The Elf Fairy | |
| 2007 | Bee Movie | Trudy | |
| 2008 | Madagascar: Escape 2 Africa | Gloria | |
| 2009 | Astro Boy | "Our Friends" narrator | |
| 2009 | A Christmas Carol | Belle | |
| 2010 | Cats & Dogs: The Revenge of Kitty Galore | Catherine | |
| 2011 | Madagascar 3: Europe's Most Wanted | Gloria | |
| 2012 | Frankenweenie | Susan Frankenstein | |
| 2013 | Tarzan | Alice Greystoke | |
| 2013 | The Garden of Words | Yukari Yukino | |
| 2014 | The Book of Life | Mary Beth | |
| 2014 | Grendizer, Getter Robo G, Great Mazinger: Kessen! Daikaijuu | Princess Teronna | |
| 2016 | Your Name | Yukari Yukino | |
| 2016 | Kubo and the Two Strings | Sariatu | |
| 2018 | Dilili in Paris | Emma Calvé | |
| 2021 | PAW Patrol: The Movie | Carmen | |
| 2023 | PAW Patrol: The Mighty Movie | Carmen | |
| 2023 | Ruby Gillman, Teenage Kraken | Agatha Gillman | |

==== Films (Live action, Italian dub) ====
| Year | Title | Role(s) | Original actor | Ref |
|---|---|---|---|---|
| 1996 | Breaking the Waves | Bess McNeill | Emily Watson | |
| 1996 | 101 Dalmatians | Anita Campbell-Green-Dearly | Joely Richardson | |
| 1996 | Mars Attacks | Nathalie Lake, Sharona | Sarah Jessica Parker, Christina Applegate | |
| 1997 | Metroland | Marion Lloyd | Emily Watson | |
| 1997 | The Boxer | Maggie | Emily Watson | |
| 1997 | Titanic | Rose DeWitt Bukater | Kate Winslet | |
| 1998 | The Girl of Your Dreams | Macarena Granada | Penélope Cruz | |
| 1999 | Cradle Will Rock | Olive Stanton | Emily Watson | |
| 1999 | Angela's Ashes | Angela McCourt | Emily Watson | |
| 2000 | Quills | Madeleine "Maddy" LeClerc | Kate Winslet | |
| 2001 | Captain Corelli's Mandolin | Pelagia | Penélope Cruz | |
| 2001 | Vanilla Sky | Sofia Serrano | Penélope Cruz | |
| 2001 | Gosford Park | Elsie | Emily Watson | |
| 2001 | The Others | Grace Stewart | Nicole Kidman | |
| 2001 | Birthday Girl | Sophia / Nadia | Nicole Kidman | |
| 2002 | The Hours | Virginia Woolf | Nicole Kidman | |
| 2002 | Red Dragon | Reba McClane | Emily Watson | |
| 2002 | Phone Booth | Kelly Shepard | Radha Mitchell | |
| 2003 | The Life of David Gale | Bitsey Bloom | Kate Winslet | |
| 2003 | The Matrix Reloaded | Niobe | Jada Pinkett Smith | |
| 2003 | The Matrix Revolutions | Niobe | Jada Pinkett Smith | |
| 2003 | Le Divorce | Isabel Walker | Kate Hudson | |
| 2003 | Kill Bill: Volume 1 | Beatrix Kiddo / The Bride | Uma Thurman | |
| 2003 | Dogville | Grace Margaret Mulligan | Nicole Kidman | |
| 2003 | The Human Stain | Faunia Farley | Nicole Kidman | |
| 2003 | Cold Mountain | Ada Monroe | Nicole Kidman | |
| 2004 | The Life and Death of Peter Sellers | Anne Sellers | Emily Watson | |
| 2004 | Eternal Sunshine of the Spotless Mind | Clementine Kruczynski | Kate Winslet | |
| 2004 | Noel | Nina Vasquez | Penélope Cruz | |
| 2004 | Land of Plenty | Lana | Michelle Williams | |
| 2004 | Kill Bill: Volume 2 | Beatrix Kiddo / The Bride | Uma Thurman | |
| 2004 | Man on Fire | Lisa Ramos | Radha Mitchell | |
| 2004 | Melinda and Melinda | Melinda Robicheaux | Radha Mitchell | |
| 2004 | The Stepford Wives | Joanna Eberhart | Nicole Kidman | |
| 2004 | Birth | Anna | Nicole Kidman | |
| 2005 | Romance & Cigarettes | Tula | Kate Winslet | |
| 2005 | Sahara | Eva Rojas | Penélope Cruz | |
| 2005 | The Interpreter | Silvia Broome | Nicole Kidman | |
| 2005 | Be Cool | Edie Athens | Uma Thurman | |
| 2005 | Prime | Raffaela "Rafi" Gardet | Uma Thurman | |
| 2005 | The Producers | Ulla | Uma Thurman | |
| 2005 | Mozart and the Whale | Isabelle "Izzy" Sorenson | Radha Mitchell | |
| 2006 | Fur | Diane Arbus | Nicole Kidman | |
| 2006 | All the King's Men | Anne Stanton | Kate Winslet | |
| 2006 | Little Children | Sarah Pierce | Kate Winslet | |
| 2006 | My Super Ex-Girlfriend | Jennifer Johnson / G-Girl | Uma Thurman | |
| 2006 | Miss Potter | Millie Warne | Emily Watson | |
| 2007 | The Invasion | Dr. Carol Bennell | Nicole Kidman | |
| 2007 | The Golden Compass | Mrs. Coulter | Nicole Kidman | |
| 2007 | The Water Horse: Legend of the Deep | Anne MacMorrow | Emily Watson | |
| 2008 | Vicky Cristina Barcelona | María Elena | Penélope Cruz | |
| 2008 | Revolutionary Road | April Wheeler | Kate Winslet | |
| 2008 | The Reader | Hanna Schmitz | Kate Winslet | |
| 2008 | Fireflies in the Garden | Jane Lawrence | Emily Watson | |
| 2008 | Synecdoche, New York | Tammy | Emily Watson | |
| 2008 | The Accidental Husband | Emma Lloyd | Uma Thurman | |
| 2009 | Indiana Jones and the Raiders of the Lost Ark (2009 redub) | Marion Ravenwood | Karen Allen | |
| 2009 | Thick as Thieves | Alexandra Korolenko | Radha Mitchell | |
| 2010 | Rabbit Hole | Becca Corbett | Nicole Kidman | |
| 2010 | The Debt | Young Rachel Singer | Jessica Chastain | |
| 2010 | Percy Jackson & the Olympians: The Lightning Thief | Medusa | Uma Thurman | |
| 2010 | Shutter Island | Dolores Daniels | Michelle Williams | |
| 2010 | The Crazies | Judy | Radha Mitchell | |
| 2011 | Coriolanus | Virgilia | Jessica Chastain | |
| 2011 | Just Go with It | Devlin Adams | Nicole Kidman | |
| 2011 | Trespass | Sarah Miller | Nicole Kidman | |
| 2011 | My Week with Marilyn | Marilyn Monroe | Michelle Williams | |
| 2011 | Carnage | Nancy Cowan | Kate Winslet | |
| 2011 | Contagion | Dr. Erin Mears | Kate Winslet | |
| 2011 | Pirates of the Caribbean: On Stranger Tides | Angelica | Penélope Cruz | |
| 2011 | War Horse | Rose Narracott | Emily Watson | |
| 2012 | Anna Karenina | Countess Lidia Ivanovna | Emily Watson | |
| 2012 | Twice Born | Gemma | Penélope Cruz | |
| 2012 | Bel Ami | Madeleine Forestier | Uma Thurman | |
| 2012 | Playing for Keeps | Patti | Uma Thurman | |
| 2012 | Lawless | Maggie Beauford | Jessica Chastain | |
| 2012 | Zero Dark Thirty | Maya | Jessica Chastain | |
| 2013 | The Railway Man | Patricia Lomax | Nicole Kidman | |
| 2013 | The Book Thief | Rosa Hubermann | Emily Watson | |
| 2013 | Belle | Elizabeth Murray | Emily Watson | |
| 2013 | Oz the Great and Powerful | Glinda | Michelle Williams | |
| 2013 | Nymphomaniac | Mrs. H | Uma Thurman | |
| 2013 | Olympus Has Fallen | Leah Banning | Radha Mitchell | |
| 2013 | Mama | Annabel | Jessica Chastain | |
| 2013 | The Counselor | Laura | Penélope Cruz | |
| 2013 | Movie 43 | Beth | Kate Winslet | |
| 2013 | Labor Day | Adele Wheeler | Kate Winslet | |
| 2014 | Testament of Youth | Mrs. Brittain | Emily Watson | |
| 2014 | Divergent | Jeanine Matthews | Kate Winslet | |
| 2014 | A Little Chaos | Sabine de Barra | Kate Winslet | |
| 2014 | Interstellar | Murphy Cooper | Jessica Chastain | |
| 2014 | The Disappearance of Eleanor Rigby | Eleanor Rigby | Jessica Chastain | |
| 2014 | A Most Violent Year | Anna Morales | Jessica Chastain | |
| 2014 | Grace of Monaco | Grace Kelly | Nicole Kidman | |
| 2014 | Paddington | Millicent Clyde | Nicole Kidman | |
| 2015 | Ma Ma | Magda | Penélope Cruz | |
| 2015 | The Divergent Series: Insurgent | Jeanine Matthews | Kate Winslet | |
| 2015 | Steve Jobs | Joanna Hoffman | Kate Winslet | |
| 2015 | The Dressmaker | Myrtle "Tilly" Dunnage | Kate Winslet | |
| 2015 | Suite Française | Lucile Angellier | Michelle Williams | |
| 2015 | Secret in Their Eyes | Claire Sloan | Nicole Kidman | |
| 2015 | Strangerland | Catherine Parker | Nicole Kidman | |
| 2015 | A Royal Night Out | Queen Elizabeth | Emily Watson | |
| 2016 | Zoolander 2 | Valentina Valencia | Penélope Cruz | |
| 2016 | Grimsby | Rhonda George | Penélope Cruz | |
| 2016 | Triple 9 | Irina Vlaslov | Kate Winslet | |
| 2016 | Collateral Beauty | Claire Wilson | Kate Winslet | |
| 2016 | London Has Fallen | Leah Banning | Radha Mitchell | |
| 2016 | The Huntsman: Winter's War | Sara | Jessica Chastain | |
| 2016 | Miss Sloane | Elizabeth Sloane | Jessica Chastain | |
| 2016 | The Family Fang | Annie Fang | Nicole Kidman | |
| 2016 | Genius | Aline Bernstein | Nicole Kidman | |
| 2016 | Lion | Sue Brierley | Nicole Kidman | |
| 2017 | The Mountain Between Us | Alex Martin | Kate Winslet | |
| 2017 | Wonder Wheel | Ginny Rannell | Kate Winslet | |
| 2017 | Molly's Game | Molly Bloom | Jessica Chastain | |
| 2017 | All the Money in the World | Gail Harris | Michelle Williams | |
| 2017 | Murder on the Orient Express | Pilar Estravados | Penélope Cruz | |
| 2017 | Loving Pablo | Virginia Vallejo | Penélope Cruz | |
| 2017 | Kingsman: The Golden Circle | Chief of Staff Fox | Emily Watson | |
| 2017 | On Chesil Beach | Violet Ponting | Emily Watson | |
| 2017 | The Beguiled | Martha Farnsworth | Nicole Kidman | |
| 2017 | The Killing of a Sacred Deer | Anna Murphy | Nicole Kidman | |
| 2018 | Aquaman | Atlanna | Nicole Kidman | |
| 2018 | Boy Erased | Nancy Eamons | Nicole Kidman | |
| 2018 | I Feel Pretty | Avery LeClaire | Michelle Williams | |
| 2018 | Everybody Knows | Laura | Penélope Cruz | |
| 2018 | The Happy Prince | Constance Lloyd | Emily Watson | |
| 2019 | Bombshell | Gretchen Carlson | Nicole Kidman | |
| 2019 | The Goldfinch | Samantha Barbour | Nicole Kidman | |
| 2019 | After the Wedding | Isabel Andersen | Michelle Williams | |
| 2019 | Wasp Network | Olga Salanueva-González | Penélope Cruz | |
| 2020 | Ammonite | Mary Anning | Kate Winslet | |
| 2020 | The Prom | Angie Dickinson | Nicole Kidman | |
| 2021 | Being the Ricardos | Lucille Ball | Nicole Kidman | |
| 2021 | Official Competition | Lola Cuevas | Penélope Cruz | |
| 2021 | The Forgiven | Jo Henninger | Jessica Chastain | |
| 2022 | Hollywood Stargirl | Roxanne Martel | Uma Thurman | |
| 2022 | The 355 | Mason "Mace" Browne | Jessica Chastain | |
| 2022 | Avatar: The Way of Water | Ronal | Kate Winslet | |
| 2022 | The Northman | Queen Gudrún | Nicole Kidman | |
| 2022 | The Fabelmans | Mitzi Fabelman | Michelle Williams | |
| 2023 | Aquaman and the Lost Kingdom | Atlanna | Nicole Kidman | |
| 2023 | Ferrari | Laura Ferrari | Penélope Cruz | |
| 2023 | The Kill Room | Patricia | Uma Thurman | |
| 2024 | A Family Affair | Brooke Harwood | Nicole Kidman | |

==== Television (Animation, Italian dub) ====
| Year | Title | Role(s) | Notes | Ref |
|---|---|---|---|---|
| 1994–1995 | Free Willy | Marlene | Main cast | |
| 1996 | Animaniacs | Katie Ka-Boom | Recurring role | |
| 2001-2006 | Family Guy | Kate Winslet | 3 episodes | |
| 2001-2006 | Family Guy | Brooke Roberts | 3 episodes | |
| 2001-2006 | Family Guy | Uma Thurman / Mia Wallace | 3 episodes | |

==== Television (Live action, Italian dub) ====
| Year | Title | Role(s) | Notes | Original actor | Ref |
|---|---|---|---|---|---|
| 1995 | The Fresh Prince of Bel-Air | Lisa Wilkes | Recurring role; Season 5 | Nia Long | |
| 2001–2010 | Scrubs | Elliot Reid | Main cast | Sarah Chalke | |
| 2002 | Hysterical Blindness | Debby Miller | TV film | Uma Thurman | |
| 2005 | Extras | Kate Winslet | 1 episode | Kate Winslet | |
| 2005–2009, 2017 | Prison Break | Sara Tancredi | Main role; Seasons 1–2, 4–5 | Sarah Wayne Callies | |
| 2010 | Agatha Christie's Poirot | Mary Debenham | 1 episode | Jessica Chastain | |
| 2010–2013 | The Walking Dead | Lori Grimes | Main cast; Seasons 1–3 | Sarah Wayne Callies | |
| 2011 | Mildred Pierce | Mildred Pierce | TV miniseries | Kate Winslet | |
| 2015 | True Detective | Jordan Semyon | 8 episodes | Kelly Reilly | |
| 2015–2016 | Wayward Pines | Kate Hewson | Main cast | Carla Gugino | |
| 2017–present | Big Little Lies | Celeste Wright | Main cast | Nicole Kidman | |
| 2019 | Chernobyl | Ulana Khomyuk | TV miniseries | Emily Watson | |
| 2020 | The Third Day | Mrs. Martin | TV miniseries | Emily Watson | |
| 2025 | The Eternaut | Ana | TV miniseries | Andrea Pietra | |
