= Pino Colizzi =

Italian voice actor (1937–2026)

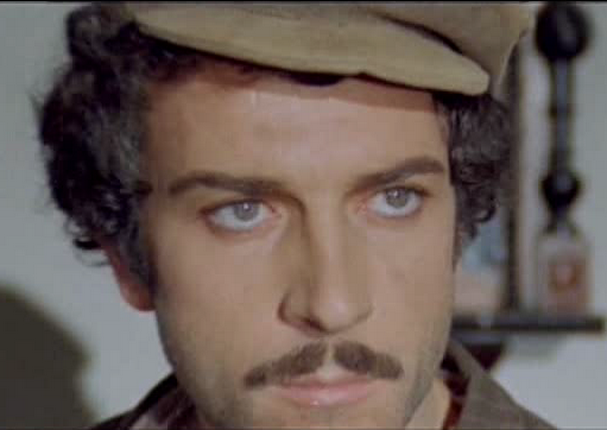
- Colizzi in Italian Graffiti (1973)
- Born: Giuseppe Colizzi; 12 November 1937; Rome, Italy
- Died: 14 February 2026 (aged 88); Formello (Rome), Italy
- Occupations: Actor; voice actor; dubbing director
- Years active: 1960–2015
- Spouse: Manuela Andrei (divorced)
- Children: 2, including Chiara Colizzi

Giuseppe "Pino" Colizzi (12 November 1937 – 14 February 2026) was an Italian actor, voice actor and dubbing director.

== Biography ==
Born in Rome, November 12, 1937, as Giuseppe Colizzi, he started his career on stage at 17 years old, then he graduated at the Accademia Nazionale d'Arte Drammatica Silvio D'Amico and in 1960 he got his first major role, playing the title character in an Italian TV adaptation of Tom Jones. His career became more intense between the 1970s and the early 1980s, when he starred in a number of successful TV series and genre films. In 1977, he was cast as Jobab in Franco Zeffirelli's TV series Jesus of Nazareth, also dubbing the main character, portrayed by Robert Powell, in the Italian version. Beginning in the 1980s, Colizzi focused on his activities as a voice actor and dubbing director.

He became a successful voice dubbing artist, having regularly dubbed over the voices of Jack Nicholson, James Caan, Richard Dreyfuss, Omar Sharif and Franco Nero, also dubbing Michael Douglas (a role which he shared with Oreste Rizzini) in a select number of his films. Some of Colizzi's most popular dubbing contributions include Superman (played by Christopher Reeve) in the Italian dub of the first three films of the Superman film series until being replaced by Sergio Di Stefano in the fourth film. He also dubbed Sonny Corleone in The Godfather, Sonny and Vito Corleone in The Godfather Part II, and Hooper in Jaws. He was the Italian voice of the title character in Disney's animated film Robin Hood, Julius Caesar in Asterix the Gaul and a sportscaster in one of Goofy's shorts, Tennis Racquet. Colizzi also supervised the dubbing process for all of Franco Zeffirelli's films.

Colizzi is also best known as a dubbing director, directing over 133 dubs. The dubs he directed include Pulp Fiction, Die Hard with a Vengeance, GoldenEye, The Devil's Advocate, The Matrix, Signs, Master and Commander: The Far Side of the World, and Sideways.

In 1999, he performed alongside Maggie Smith, Cher, and Judi Dench in Tea with Mussolini, portraying Dino Grandi, and kept acting in cinema until the 2010s, when he decided to focus his career on literature. He closed his on-screen career portraying Al Mustapha in the TV film Il profeta, inspired from Khalil Gibran's book The Prophet.

=== Personal life ===
With his ex-wife Manuela Andrei, Colizzi had two children, including voice actress Chiara Colizzi.

Colizzi died in Formello (Rome) on 14 February 2026, at the age of 88.

== Filmography ==
=== Cinema ===
- Everyone's in Love (1959)
- Labbra rosse (1960)
- Tom Jones (TV mini-series, 1960)
- 24 ore di terrore (1964)
- Metello (1970)
- Chronicle of a Homicide (1972)
- Black Turin (1972)
- Winged Devils (1972)
- I Kiss the Hand (1973)
- Italian Graffiti (1973)
- Il commissario De Vincenzi (TV series, 1974)
- A Common Sense of Modesty (1976)
- Born Winner (1976)
- Il medico... la studentessa (1976)
- Jesus of Nazareth (1977, TV mini-series)
- The Bishop's Bedroom (1977)
- Bermuda: Cave of the Sharks (1978)
- Puzzle (TV mini-series, 1978)
- Brothers Till We Die (1978)
- Vai avanti tu che mi vien da ridere (1982)
- Notturno (1983)
- Crime in Formula One (1984)
- La piovra (TV miniseries, 1984)
- Salomè (1986)
- Volevo i pantaloni (1990)
- Dicembre (1990)
- La fine dell'intervista (1994)
- Butterfly (TV series, 1995)
- Tea with Mussolini (1999)
- Il bello delle donne (TV series, 2001-2002)
- Sei come sei (2002)
- Holy Money (2009)
- Alaska (2015)
- Il profeta (TV film, 2016)

== Voice work ==
- Narrator in Death Rides Along
- Voice of the afterlife in The Beyond (1981)
- Peterson's recorded voice in House by the Cemetery
- Narrator of "Lungo la via d'un campo" segment in Degnità: aforismi, massime, postulati di una vita

=== Dubbing roles ===
==== Animation ====
- Robin Hood in Robin Hood
- Charlie B. Barkin in All Dogs Go to Heaven
- Narrator in Fantasia (1973 redub)
- Julius Caesar in Asterix the Gaul
- Skrawl in ChalkZone

==== Live action ====
- Clark Kent / Superman in Superman, Superman II, Superman III
- Sonny Corleone in The Godfather, Sonny Corleone and Vito Corleone in The Godfather Part II
- Matt Hooper in Jaws
- Richard Adams in The China Syndrome
- Dan Gallagher in Fatal Attraction
- William Foster in Falling Down
- Mark Forman in Heartburn
- Grady Tripp in Wonder Boys
- Tom Sanders in Disclosure
- Nick Conklin in Black Rain
- President James Dale / Art Land in Mars Attacks!
- Milo Tindle in Sleuth
- Sean McLennon in North Star
- Roy Neary in Close Encounters of the Third Kind
- Philip Blackwood in Her Alibi
- Jimmie Rainwood in An Innocent Man
- Peter Mitchell in Three Men and a Little Lady
- Jon Aldrich in Folks!
- Chris Leece in Stakeout
- Bill "BB" Babowsky in Tin Men
- Colin Harvey in Battle of Britain
- Chang in Star Trek VI: The Undiscovered Country
- Atahualpa in The Royal Hunt of the Sun
- J. J. "Jake" Gittes in The Two Jakes
- Charley Partanna in Prizzi's Honor
- Daryl Van Horne in The Witches of Eastwick
- Bill Rorish in Broadcast News
- Francis Phelan in Ironweed
- Harry Bliss in Man Trouble
- Benjamin L. Willard in Apocalypse Now
- Joe Vandeleur in A Bridge Too Far
- Bradford Crane in The Swarm
- David Linderby in Ashanti
- Charley Fortnum in The Honorary Consul
- Sherlock Holmes / Reginald Kincaid in Without a Clue
- Private Kelly in Kelly's Heroes
- Dave Garver in Play Misty for Me
- Jonathan Hemlock in The Eiger Sanction
- Mr. Klein in Monsieur Klein
- Michel Gerfaut in Three Men to Kill
- Choucas in For a Cop's Hide
- Roger Borniche in Flic Story
- John Reed in Reds
- Joe Pendleton in Heaven Can Wait
- George Roundy in Shampoo
- Nicky Wilson in The Fortune
- John McCabe in McCabe & Mrs. Miller
- W. P. Mayhew in Barton Fink
- Clarence Oveur in Airplane!
- Martin Stett in The Conversation
- Len Peterson in Jaws 2
- James Biggs in They Shoot Horses, Don't They?
- Bob Hyde in Coming Home
- The Detective in The Driver
- Harry in Husbands
- Brad Wesley in Road House
- Tybalt in Romeo and Juliet
- Harry York in Frances
- Charles Brubaker in Capricorn One
- John Blaine in Westworld
- Darman in Prince of Shadows
- Stony De Coco in Bloodbrothers
- Bill in Days of Heaven
- Father Da Costa in A Prayer for the Dying
- Lavrentiy Beria in The Inner Circle
- Rafer Janders in The Wild Geese
- John Shaft in Shaft, Shaft's Big Score!
- Logan Sharpe in They Call Me Mister Tibbs!
- General Adlon in Meteor
