= Vittorio Colizzi =

Italian virologist

Professor Vittorio Colizzi is an Italian virologist and one of the most eminent HIV/AIDS researchers in Europe. He directs the Immunochemical and Molecular Pathology laboratory in the biology department of Tor Vergata University in Rome. With his colleague Luc Montagnier he has participated in many conferences, particularly in Africa, to combat the propagation of HIV.
