= William Wolf (critic) =

American critic (1925–2020)

- Born: 1925
- Died: March 28, 2020 (aged 94); New York City, New York, U.S.
- Occupations: Critic, author

William Wolf (1925 – March 28, 2020) was an American film and theater critic and the author.

== Career ==
Wolf was a film critic for Cue and New York magazines in the 1960s–1980s. Wolf served two years as Chairman of the New York Film Critics Circle and was a member of the National Society of Film Critics, the New York Film Critics Online, the Online Film Critics Society, PEN, the American Theatre Critics Association, the International Association of Theatre Critics, and the American Association of University Professors. He served for four years as President of the Drama Desk, an organization of critics and writers on the theater, and previously served for two years on its nominating committee for the Drama Desk Awards and was on the Drama Desk Executive Board. At New York University, he was an adjunct professor and taught Film as Literature in the English Department and Cinema and Literature in the French Department. Wolf was particularly known for his Movie Preview course, now presented independently at Lincoln Center in the Elinor Bunin Munroe Center. During the course of his career, Wolf interviewed hundreds of film and theater notables and has covered the world's major film festivals. Among those he interviewed were Ingmar Bergman and Charlie Chaplin. Audio tapes of his interviews with directors, actors, producers, and others in the world of cinema and the stage constitute the William Wolf Film and Theater Interview Collection (1972–1998), part of the Rodgers and Hammerstein Archives of Recorded Sound, that he donated to the New York Public Library of the Performing Arts.

Wolf was the author of Landmark Films: The Cinema and Our Century, which he wrote in collaboration with his wife, Lillian Kramer Wolf, and of The Marx Brothers. He has contributed chapters on "Easy Rider" and "Duck Soup" to "The A List: 100 Essential Films" a collection of reviews by members of the National Society of Film Critics, and "The Eroticism of Words" and "Kinsey" chapters in the National Society's sequel, "The X List."

== Death ==
He died from complications brought on by COVID-19 on March 28, 2020, during the COVID-19 pandemic in New York (state).
