= Iowa Department of Cultural Affairs =

Agency in the US state of Iowa

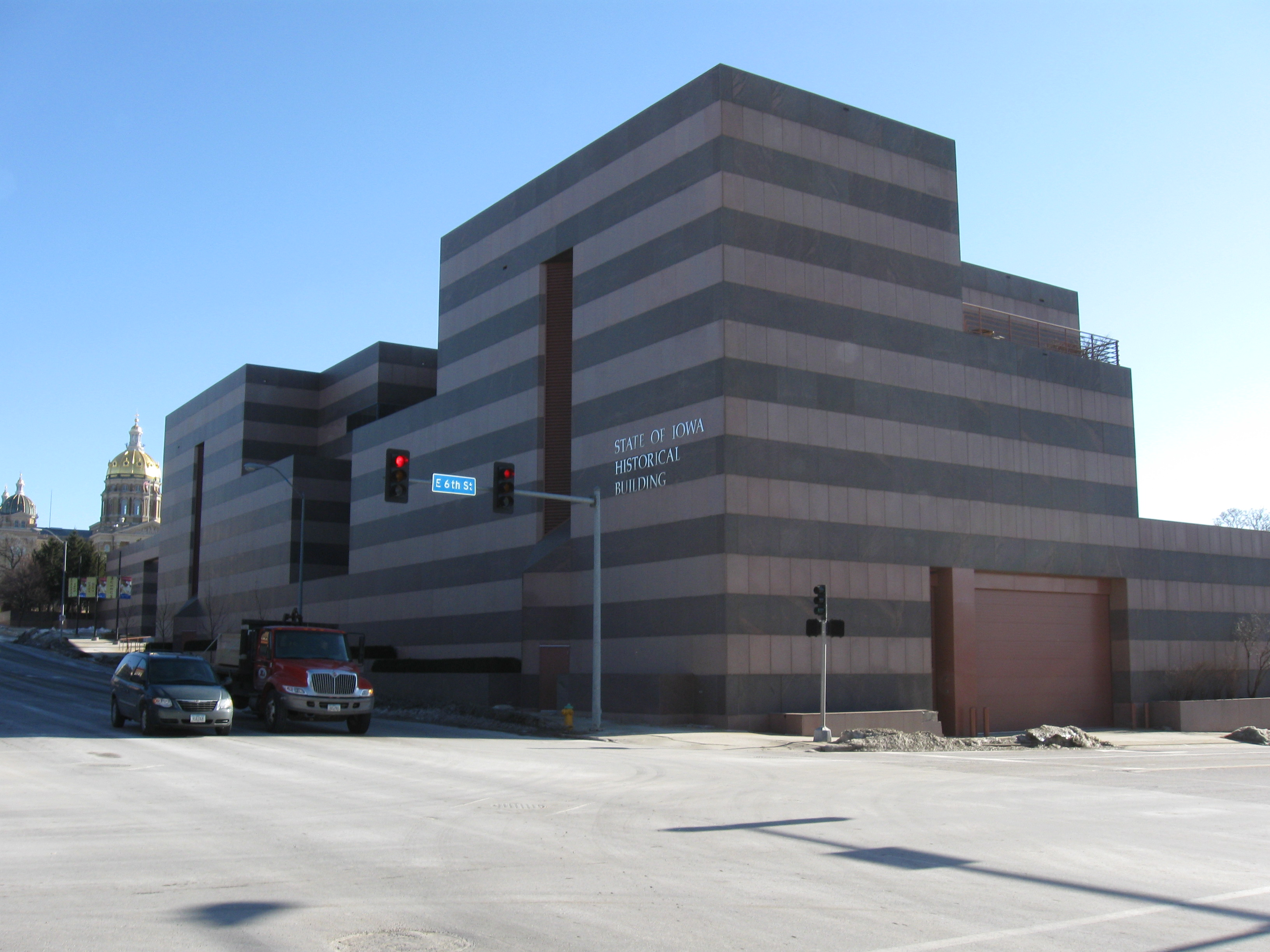
Iowa Department of Cultural Affairs/State Historical Society Building, Des Moines.

Iowa Department of Cultural Affairs is an agency of the Iowa state government, headquartered in Des Moines. Agencies of the department include the Iowa Arts Council, Produce Iowa, the State Historical Society of Iowa, the Iowa City and Des Moines research centers, and the Iowa State Society, Museum, and Preservation agency.

The department gives grants to artists in the state.
