= Angelo Rizzoli (publisher, born 1943) =

Italian publisher and producer

- Born: 12 November 1943; Como, Lombardy, Italy
- Died: 11 December 2013 (aged 70); Rome, Italy
- Other name: Angelone
- Occupations: Film producer and publisher
- Known for: RCS MediaGroup

Angelo Rizzoli (12 November 1943 – 11 December 2013) was an Italian film producer and publisher. He was son of Andrea Rizzoli, president of the RCS MediaGroup publishing house, and grandson of Angelo Rizzoli who founded the Italian publishing group Rizzoli Libri, later becoming RCS MediaGroup.

== Biography ==
Angelo Rizzoli Jr. was born in Como, Italy on 12 November 1943. At age 18 he discovered that he had been affected by multiple sclerosis, which left him a disability to the right hand and leg. Following the death of Angelo Rizzoli, at age 28 he became part of the family business and was named the head of the board of directors. Four years later, RCS MediaGroup purchased Italy's most circulated newspaper, Corriere Della Sera, a move that would place him under the interest of the Masonic Lodge Propaganda Due.

In 1981 the Corriere Della Sera was cited among the organizations part of the Propaganda Due scandals. In 1983 he was arrested, detained, and absolved thirteen months later after the Irish supreme court ruled that the funds had alluded to be retained by Rizzoli were in fact withdrawn by Zirka Corp and hidden within a Rothschild bank account in Zürich, ruling out Rizzoli's role in the scandal.

He later founded Rizzoli Audiovisivi, through which he produced television series for the Italian television networks RAI and Mediaset. In 1987, he came back for the big production slate through his new company Errefilm, which is only a hint of the rich film and television program the former head of the Rizzoli publishing empire the company had assembled during the past few years, through the October 12 start of Love and Fear, and named for the producer's initial, but also could stand for the word "reborn". In 1991 he married Melania De Nichilo, a medical doctor of the Chamber of Deputies and later Member of Parliament. He had three sons, Andrea Rizzoli, Arrigo Rizzoli, and Alberto Rizzoli.

Rizzoli was arrested in February 2013 on bankruptcy fraud charges related to his business dealings. Despite a series of illnesses including multiple sclerosis, kidney failure, hypertension, and diabetes, he denied domiciliary arrest and held in the Sandro Pertini detention care facility without access to physical therapy, which would permanently undermine his ability to walk. After five months he was released and transferred to the Gemelli hospital due to deteriorating health conditions, where he died on 11 December 2013.

== Bibliography ==
- Alberto Mazzuca, La Erre verde, Longanesi 1991.
- Pialuisa Bianco, "Schiavo d'un sindacato potente come un soviet", L'Europeo, n° 17 del 26 aprile 1991.
