= Giorgia Fiorio =

Italian photographer born 1967

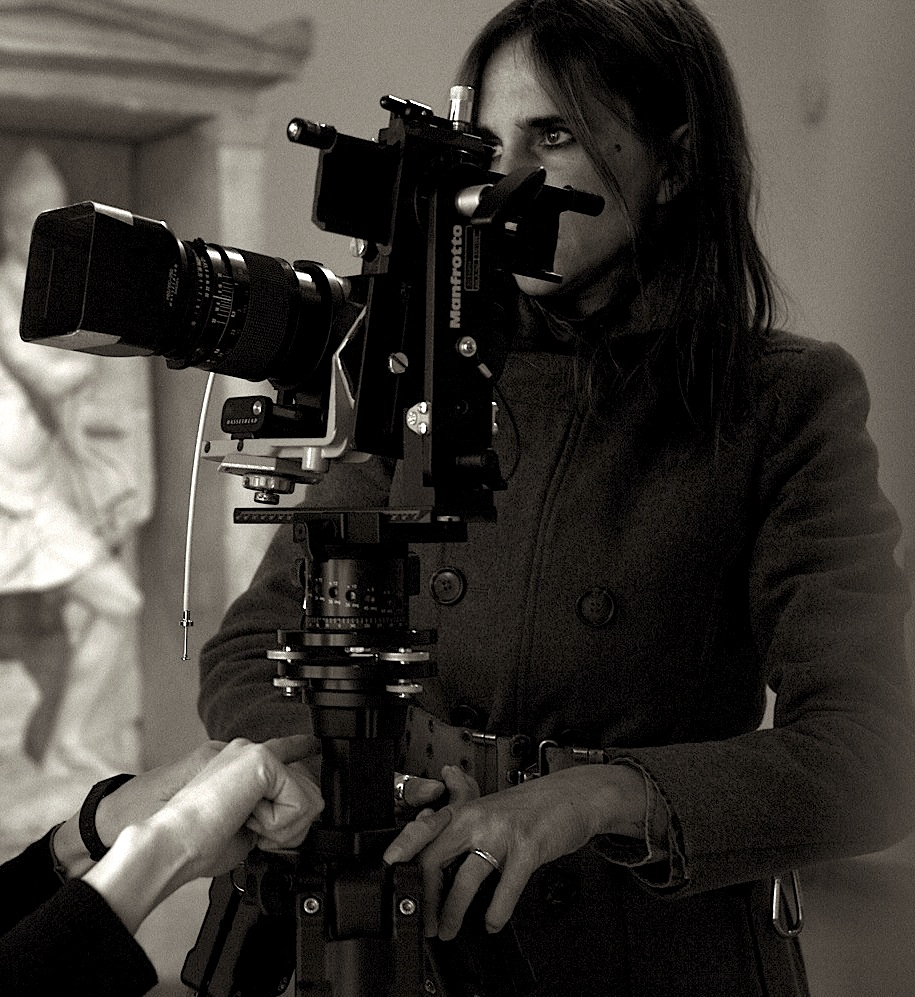
Giorgia Fiorio in Athens, as a photographer.

Giorgia Fiorio (born 23 July 1967 in Turin) is a photographer, artist, and essayist from Turin, Italy.

As a teenager, she was a pop singer, and performed at the San Remo Festival. At age twenty, she decided she wanted to be a photographer. She attended the International Center of Photography in New York City.

In 1995, Fiorio won the $10,000 Ernst Haas Prize for her documentary work. In 1997, Fiorio was named Documentary Photographer of the Year by the magazine American Photography.

== Discography ==
=== Albums ===
- 1984 - Giorgia Fiorio (LP)
- 1986 - Giorgia (LP)
- 1988 - Prende al cuore (LP)

=== Singles ===
- 1982 - Bimbo / Segreti
- 1983 - Avrò / Segreti
- 1983 - Un'altra estate / Indovinare
- 1984 - Se ti spogli / Bimbo
- 1986 - Pirates of Love / Take It or Leave It
- 1986 - Tell Me Why / Take It or Leave It
- 1986 - "Pirate of love" / "Pirate of love" (instrumental version)
- 1986 - "Take it or leave it" / "Pirate of love" (Radio version)
- 1987 - Rock Show / Clip Show
- 1987 - "Rock Show" / "You're the First the Last My Everything"
- 1988 - Io con te / Prende al cuore

== Books ==
- Fiorio, Giorgia (2001), Men, Hamburg Gruner und Jahr, OCLC 722760415
- Fiorio, Giorgia; Del Giudice, Daniele; Bauret, Gabriel, Rituale, OCLC 699783667
