= David di Donatello for Best Costumes =

Annual Italian film award

The David di Donatello for Best Costumes (Italian: David di Donatello per i migliori costumi), known as the David di Donatello per la migliore costumista prior to 2023, is a film award presented annually by the Accademia del Cinema Italiano (ACI, Academy of Italian Cinema) to recognize outstanding efforts on the part of film costume designers who have worked within the Italian film industry during the year preceding the ceremony. It was first presented during the 1981 edition of the David di Donatello award show.

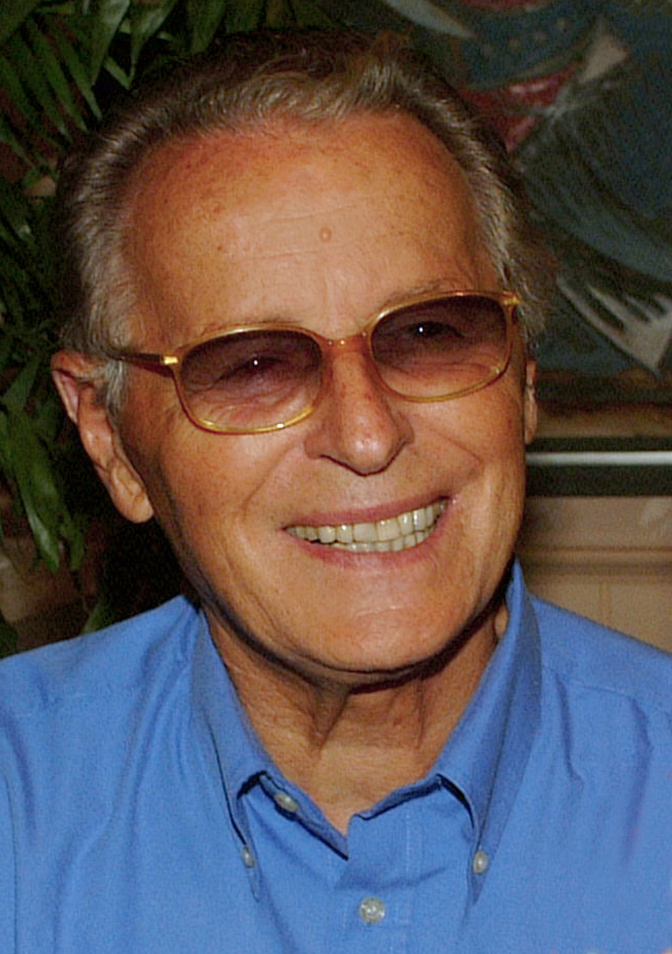
Piero Tosi was the first costume designer to win the prize in 1981, obtaining a total of three in his career.

== Winners and nominees ==
Winners are indicated in bold.

=== 1980s ===
1981

- **Piero Tosi** – The Lady of the Camellias
- Gabriella Pescucci – Three Brothers
- Luciano Calosso – Fontamara

1982

- **Gianna Gissi** – Il marchese del Grillo
- Luca Sabatelli – Portrait of a Woman, Nude
- Enzo Bulgarelli – Forest of Love

1983

- **Gabriella Pescucci** – That Night in Varennes
- Nicoletta Ercole – The Story of Piera
- Lucia Mirisola – State buoni se potete
- Lina Nerli Taviani – The Night of the Shooting Stars

1984

- **Nanà Cecchi** – Hearts and Armour
- Ezio Altieri – Le Bal
- Maurizio Millenotti – And the Ship Sails On

1985

- **Enrico Job** – Carmen
- Lina Nerli Taviani – Kaos
- Mario Carlini – A Proper Scandal

1986

- **Danilo Donati** – Ginger and Fred
- Gino Persico – Camorra
- Aldo Buti – The Venetian Woman

1987

- **Gabriella Pescucci** – The Name of the Rose
- Anna Anni and Maurizio Millenotti – Otello
- Gabriella Pescucci – The Family

1988

- **James Acheson** and **Ugo Pericoli** – The Last Emperor
- Nanà Cecchi – The Gold Rimmed Glasses
- Carlo Diappi – Dark Eyes

1989

- **Lucia Mirisola** – 'O Re
- Danilo Donati – Francesco
- Gabriella Pescucci – Splendor

=== 1990s ===
1990

- **Gianna Gissi** – Open Doors
- Milena Canonero and Alberto Verso – The Bachelor
- Maurizio Millenotti – The Voice of the Moon
- Danda Ortona – Street Kids
- Graziella Virgili – The Story of Boys & Girls

1991

- **Lucia Mirisola** – In the Name of the Sovereign People
- Odette Nicoletti – Captain Fracassa's Journey
- Francesco Panni – Mediterraneo
- Antonella Berardi – The Amusements of Private Life
- Lina Nerli Taviani – The Sun Also Shines at Night

1992

- **Lina Nerli Taviani** – Rossini! Rossini!
- Enrica Barbano – The Wicked
- Gianna Gissi – The Stolen Children

1993

- **Elisabetta Beraldo** – Jonah Who Lived in the Whale
- Lina Nerli Taviani – Fiorile
- Sissi Parravicini – Magnificat

1994

- **Piero Tosi** – Sparrow
- Maurizio Millenotti – The Secret of the Old Woods
- Gabriella Pescucci – For Love, Only for Love

1995

- **Olga Berlutti** – Farinelli
- Elisabetta Beraldo – Sostiene Pereira
- Moidele Bickel – La Reine Margot

1996

- **Jenny Beavan** – Jane Eyre
- Beatrice Bordone – The Star Maker
- Luciano Sagoni – Celluloide

1997

- **Danilo Donati** – Marianna Ucrìa
- Patrizia Chericoni and Florence Emir – Nirvana
- Lina Nerli Taviani – The Elective Affinities
- Francesca Sartori – The Prince of Homburg
- Alberto Verso – The Truce

1998

- **Danilo Donati** – Life Is Beautiful
- Vittoria Guaita – The Best Man
- Maurizio Millenotti – The Bride's Journey

1999

- **Maurizio Millenotti** – The Legend of 1900
- Gianna Gissi – The Way We Laughed
- Gino Persico – Ferdinando and Carolina

=== 2000s ===
2000

- **Sergio Ballo** – The Nanny
- Alfonsina Lettieri – Canone inverso
- Lucia Mirisola – La Carbonara

2001

- **Elisabetta Montaldo** – One Hundred Steps
- Maurizio Millenotti – Malèna
- Odette Nicoletti – Unfair Competition

2002

- **Francesca Sartori** – The Profession of Arms
- Nanà Cecchi – The Knights of the Quest
- Maria Rita Barbera – Light of My Eyes
- Silvia Nebiolo – Burning in the Wind

2003

- **Danilo Donati** – Pinocchio
- Mario Carlini and Francesco Crivellini – Incantato
- Elena Mannini – A Journey Called Love
- Francesca Sartori – The Soul Keeper
- Andrea Viotti – El Alamein: The Line of Fire

2004

- **Francesca Sartori** – Singing Behind Screens
- Gemma Mascagni – What Will Happen to Us
- Elisabetta Montaldo – The Best of Youth
- Silvia Nebiolo – Agata and the Storm
- Isabella Rizza – Don't Move

2005

- **Daniela Ciancio** – The Remains of Nothing
- Maria Rita Barbera – The Life That I Want
- Catia Dottori – Sacred Heart
- Gianna Gissi – An Italian Romance
- Gemma Mascagni – Manual of Love

2006

- **Nicoletta Taranta** – Romanzo Criminale
- Francesco Crivellini – The Second Wedding Night
- Annalisa Giacci – Fuoco su di me
- Tatiana Romanoff – My Best Enemy
- Lina Nerli Taviani – The Caiman

2007

- **Mariano Tufano** – Nuovomondo
- Maurizio Millenotti – Napoleon and Me
- Nicoletta Ercole – The Unknown Woman
- Mariarita Barbera – My Brother Is an Only Child
- Lina Nerli Taviani – The Lark Farm

2008

- **Milena Canonero** – I Viceré
- Ortensia De Francesco – Don't Waste Your Time, Johnny!
- Catia Dottori – Hotel Meina
- Maurizio Millenotti – Parlami d'amore
- Silvia Nebiolo and Patrizia Mazzon – Days and Clouds
- Alessandra Toesca – Quiet Chaos

2009

- **Elisabetta Montaldo** – The Demons of St. Petersberg
- Alessandra Cardini – Gomorrah
- Mario Carlini and Francesco Crivellini – Giovanna's Father
- Daniela Ciancio – Il divo
- Lia Morandini – Caravaggio

=== 2010s ===
2010

- **Sergio Ballo** – Vincere
- Luigi Bonanno – Baarìa
- Lia Francesca Morandini – The Man Who Will Come
- Gabriella Pescucci – The First Beautiful Thing
- Alessandro Lai – Loose Cannons

2011

- **Ursula Patzak** – Noi credevamo
- Alfonsina Lettieri – Amici miei – Come tutto ebbe inizio
- Nanà Cecchi – Christine Cristina
- Francesca Sartori – La Passione
- Roberto Chiocchi – Angel of Evil

2012

- **Lina Nerli Taviani** – We Have a Pope
- Rossano Marchi – Kryptonite!
- Alessandro Lai – Magnificent Presence
- Francesca Livia Sartori – Piazza Fontana: The Italian Conspiracy
- Karen Patch – This Must Be the Place

2013

- **Maurizio Millenotti** – The Best Offer
- Patrizia Chericoni – Siberian Education
- Grazia Colombini – It Was the Son
- Alessandro Lai – Apartment in Athens
- Roberta Vecchi and Francesca Vecchi – Diaz – Don't Clean Up This Blood

2014

- **Daniela Ciancio** – The Great Beauty
- Maria Rita Barbera – Those Happy Years
- Alessandro Lai – Fasten Your Seatbelts
- Bettina Pontiggia – Human Capital
- Cristiana Ricceri – The Mafia Kills Only in Summer

2015

- **Ursula Patzak** – Leopardi
- Marina Roberti – Black Souls
- Alessandro Lai – Latin Lover
- Lina Nerli Taviani – Wondrous Boccaccio
- Andrea Cavalletto – Greenery Will Bloom Again

2016

- **Massimo Cantini Parrini** – Tale of Tales
- Gemma Mascagni – The Correspondence
- Mary Montalto – They Call Me Jeeg
- Chiara Ferrantini – Don't Be Bad
- Carlo Poggioli – Youth

2017

- **Massimo Cantini Parrini** – Indivisible
- Cristiana Riccieri – At War with Love
- Catia Dottori – Like Crazy
- Beatrice Giannini and Elisabetta Antico – La stoffa dei sogni
- Cristina Laparola – Italian Race

2018

- **Daniela Salernitano** – Love and Bullets
- **Massimo Cantini Parrini** – Bloody Richard
- Nicoletta Taranta – Agadah
- Anna Lombardi – Brutti e cattivi
- Alessandro Lai – Napoli velata

2019

- **Ursula Patzak** – Capri-Revolution
- Giulia Piersanti – Call Me by Your Name
- Massimo Cantini Parrini – Dogman
- Loredana Buscemi – Happy as Lazzaro
- Carlo Poggioli – Loro

=== 2020s ===
2020

- **Massimo Cantini Parrini** – Pinocchio
- Nicoletta Taranta – 5 Is the Perfect Number
- Valentina Taviani – The First King: Birth of an Empire
- Daria Calvelli – The Traitor
- Andrea Cavalletto – Martin Eden

2021

- **Massimo Cantini Parrini** – Miss Marx
- Maurizio Millenotti – Hammamet
- Nicoletta Taranta – Rose Island
- Vanessa Sannino – The Macaluso Sisters
- Ursula Patzak – Hidden Away

2022

- **Ursula Patzak** – The King of Laughter
- Ginevra De Carolis – Diabolik
- Mary Montalto – Freaks Out
- Mariano Tufano – The Hand of God
- Maurizio Millenotti – I fratelli De Filippo

2023

- **Maria Rita Barbera** – Strangeness
- Carlo Poggioli – Caravaggio's Shadow
- Massimo Cantini Parrini – Chiara
- Daria Calvelli – Exterior Night
- Valentina Monticelli – Lord of the Ants

2024

- **Sergio Ballo and Daria Calvelli** – Kidnapped
- Loredana Buscemi – La chimera
- Massimo Cantini Parrini – Comandante
- Stefano Ciammitti – Io capitano
- Alberto Moretti – There's Still Tomorrow

2025

- **Massimo Cantini Parrini** – The Flood
- Mary Montalto – Gloria!
- Maria Rita Barbera – The Art of Joy
- Carlo Poggioli – Parthenope
- Andrea Cavalletto – Vermiglio

2026

- **Maria Rita Barbera and Gaia Calderone** – Primavera
- Susanna Mastroianni – Forbidden City
- Ursula Patzak – Duse
- Carlo Poggioli – La grazia
- Marina Roberti – The Tasters
