= Anna Anni =

Italian costume designer (1926–2011)

- Born: 21 November 1926; Marradi, Kingdom of Italy
- Died: 1 January 2011 (aged 84); Florence, Italy
- Occupation: Costume designer

Anna Anni (21 November 1926 – 1 January 2011) was an Italian costume designer, best known for her frequent collaborations with director Franco Zeffirelli. She was co-nominated with Maurizio Millenotti for the Academy Award for Best Costume Design for their work on Zeffirelli's 1986 film Otello.

Anni was born on 21 November 1926 in Marradi, Tuscany; she died in Florence on 1 January 2011.

== Selected filmography ==
| Year | Title | Director | Notes |
|---|---|---|---|
| 1982 | Pagliacci | Franco Zeffirelli | Television film |
| 1982 | Cavalleria rusticana | Franco Zeffirelli | Television film |
| 1986 | Otello | Franco Zeffirelli | with Maurizio Millenotti |
| 1999 | Tea with Mussolini | Franco Zeffirelli | with Jenny Beavan and Alberto Spiazzi |
| 2002 | Callas Forever | Franco Zeffirelli | with Alessandro Lai and Alberto Spiazzi |

== Awards and nominations ==
| Association | Year (Note: Indicates the year of ceremony. Each year is linked to the article about the awards held that year, wherever possible.) | Category | Work | Result | Ref. |
|---|---|---|---|---|---|
| Academy Awards | 1987 | Best Costume Design | Otello | Nominated | |
| British Academy Film Awards | 2000 | Best Costume Design | Tea with Mussolini | Nominated | |
| Ciak d'oro | 1987 | Best Costume Design | Otello | Nominated | |
| Ciak d'oro | 1999 | Best Costume Design | Tea with Mussolini | Nominated | |
| Ciak d'oro | 2003 | Best Costume Design | Callas Forever | Nominated | |
| David di Donatello Awards | 1987 | Best Costumes | Otello | Nominated | |
| Goya Awards | 2003 | Best Costume Design | Callas Forever | Nominated | |
| Nastro d'Argento Awards | 1987 | Best Costume Design | Otello | Nominated | |
| Nastro d'Argento Awards | 2000 | Best Costume Design | Tea with Mussolini | Won | |
| Nastro d'Argento Awards | 2003 | Best Costume Design | Callas Forever | Nominated | |
