= Alessandro Lai =

Italian costume designer (born 1970)

- Born: 22 January 1970 (age 56); Cagliari, Italy
- Education: University of Cagliari
- Occupation: Costume designer
- Years active: 1998-present

Alessandro Lai (born 22 January 1970) is an Italian costume designer.

== Life and career ==
Born in Cagliari, Lai graduated in letters from the University of Cagliari with a thesis about the relationship between Piero Tosi and Luchino Visconti; later he moved to Rome, where he became a pupil of Tosi at Sartoria Tirelli. He made his professional debut as assistant of Maurizio Millenotti in Giuseppe Tornatore's The Legend of 1900. He debuted as custume designer in 2000, in Giorgio Treves' Rosa and Cornelia.

Starting with Saturn in Opposition, Lai began a long professional association with director Ferzan Özpetek, and among the directors with whom he has collaborated are Franco Zeffirelli, Tinto Brass, Liliana Cavani, Francesca Archibugi. He also worked on television, mostly in Lux Vide productions such as Medici and Barabbas, and on stage, where he collaborated with Chiara and Riccardo Muti.

During his career he was awarded two Nastro d'Argento Awards, in 2002 for Senso '45, and in 2012 for Ozpetek's Magnificent Presence. In 2018, he won a Ciak D'Oro for Naples in Veils.

== Selected filmography ==
=== Cinema ===
- Rosa and Cornelia, directed by Giorgio Treves (2000)
- Sud Side Stori, directed by Roberta Torre (2000)
- Callas Forever, directed by Franco Zeffirelli (2002)
- Senso '45, directed by Tinto Brass (2002)
- Household Accounts, directed by Tonino Cervi (2003)
- Roundtrip, directed by Marco Ponti (2004)
- Vanilla and Chocolate, directed by Ciro Ippolito (2004)
- The Spectator, directed by Paolo Franchi (2004)
- Flying Lessons, directed by Francesca Archibugi (2007)
- Saturn in Opposition, directed by Ferzan Özpetek (2007)
- A Question of the Heart, directed by Francesca Archibugi (2009)
- Loose Cannons, directed by Ferzan Özpetek (2010)
- They Call It Summer, directed by Paolo Franchi (2012)
- Love Is Not Perfect, directed by Francesca Muci (2012)
- Magnificent Presence, directed by Ferzan Özpetek (2012)
- Fasten Your Seatbelts, directed by Ferzan Özpetek (2014)
- Unique Brothers, directed by Alessio Maria Federici (2014)
- ReWined, directed by Ferdinando Vicentini Orgnani (2014)
- An Italian Name, directed by Francesca Archibugi (2015)
- Latin Lover, directed by Cristina Comencini (2015)
- Ever Been to the Moon?, directed by Paolo Genovese (2015)
- Tommaso, directed by Kim Rossi Stuart (2016)
- Naples in Veils, directed by Ferzan Özpetek (2017)
- The King's Musketeers, directed by Giovanni Veronesi (2018)
- The Goddess of Fortune, directed by Ferzan Özpetek (2019)
- The Yellow Tie, directed by Serge Ioan Celebidachi (2025)
- Solo Mio, directed by the Kinnane Brothers (2026)

=== Television ===
- Virginia, la monaca di Monza, directed by Alberto Sironi (TV-movie, 2004)
- Barabbas, directed by Roger Young (TV-movie, 2012)
- Medici (TV series, 2016-2019)
- Devils (TV series, 2020-2022)
- Leonardo (TV series, 2021)
- Django (TV series, 2023)
- The Lions of Sicily (TV series, 2023)
