= Calosso (surname) =

Calosso is an Italian surname. Notable people with the surname include:

- Eugenia Calosso (1878–1914), Italian composer
- Giovanni Melchiorre Calosso (1759–1830), Italian clergy
- Giovanni Timoteo Calosso (1789–1865), Italian soldier
- Luciano Calosso (born 1953), Italian costume designer
