= Gabriella Pescucci =

Italian costume designer (born 1941)

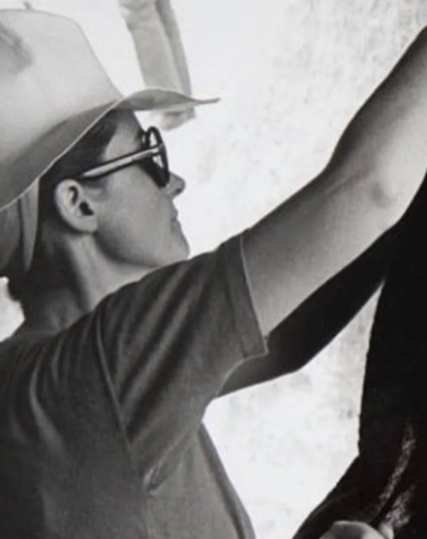
- Born: 17 January 1941 (age 85); Rosignano Solvay, Kingdom of Italy
- Occupation: Costume designer
- Years active: 1967–present

Gabriella Pescucci (Italian pronunciation: [ɡabriˈɛlla peˈskuttʃi]; born 17 January 1941) is an Italian costume designer. She has received numerous accolades, including an Academy Award, two BAFTA Film Awards, and two Emmy Awards, in addition to nominations for a BAFTA Television Award and five Costume Designers Guild Awards.

Pescucci gained prominence for her collaborations with directors Pier Paolo Pasolini, Federico Fellini, Sergio Leone, Terry Gilliam, Martin Scorsese, Tim Burton, and Neil Jordan. She has been nominated for the Academy Award for Best Costume Design three times, winning for The Age of Innocence (1993).

== Biography ==
Gabriella Pescucci was born in Tuscany in the province of Livorno. She studied art at Accademia, Florence. In 1966, she moved to Rome with the express intention of becoming a costume designer for the cinema. She began her career as an assistant to Piero Tosi on the sets of Pasolini's Medea and Visconti's Death in Venice. Pescucci took her first steps in cinema with Giuseppe Patroni Griffi at the start of the 70s, designing costumes that took inspiration from paintings by Carpaccio and Leonardo.

Her international debut was in 1984 with Once Upon a Time in America, for which she won the first of her two BAFTA Awards, the second being for The Adventures of Baron Munchausen by director Terry Gilliam and production designer Dante Ferretti.

She received many other nominations and awards, among which a David di Donatello with The Name of the Rose and an Oscar for The Age of Innocence in 1993. Some of her most popular works include costume design on Charlie and the Chocolate Factory, Les Misérables and Agora.

In addition to her film and television work, she has designed for the Opera, notably La Traviata at La Scala, Un ballo in maschera at the Kennedy Centre in Washington, D.C., and La bohème in Florence.

== Filmography ==
=== Film ===
Year	Title	Director	Notes
1967	How to Kill 400 Duponts	Steno	
1968	The Seven Cervi Brothers	Gianni Puccini	
1970	Many Wars Ago	Francesco Rosi	
1971	'Tis Pity She's a Whore	Giuseppe Patroni Griffi	
1974	The Sensual Man	Marco Vicario	
1974	The Driver's Seat	Giuseppe Patroni Griffi	
1974	The Murri Affair	Mauro Bolognini	
1975	The Divine Nymph	Giuseppe Patroni Griffi	
1976	The Inheritance	Mauro Bolognini	
1977	Il gabbiano	Marco Bellocchio	
1978	Orchestra Rehearsal	Federico Fellini	
1980	City of Women	Federico Fellini	
1981	Three Brothers	Francesco Rosi	
1981	Passion of Love	Ettore Scola	
1982	That Night in Varennes	Ettore Scola	
1984	Once Upon a Time in America	Sergio Leone	
1984	Good King Dagobert	Dino Risi	
1985	L'Orfeo	Claude Goretta	
1986	The Name of the Rose	Jean-Jacques Annaud	
1987	The Family	Ettore Scola	
1988	The Adventures of Baron Munchausen	Terry Gilliam	
1988	Haunted Summer	Ivan Passer	
1988	Splendor	Ettore Scola	
1989	What Time Is It?	Ettore Scola	
1992	Indochine	Régis Wargnier	
1993	The Age of Innocence	Martin Scorsese	
1993	For Love, Only for Love	Giovanni Veronesi	
1995	The Night and the Moment	Anna Maria Tatò	
1995	The Scarlet Letter	Roland Joffé	
1998	Dangerous Beauty	Marshall Herskovitz	
1998	Les Misérables	Bille August	
1998	Cousin Bette	Des McAnuff	
1999	A Midsummer Night's Dream	Michael Hoffman	
1999	Time Regained	Raúl Ruiz	
2003	Lost Love	Franco Battiato	
2004	Secret Passage	Ademir Kenović	
2004	Van Helsing	Stephen Sommers	with Carlo Poggioli
2005	Charlie and the Chocolate Factory	Tim Burton	
2005	The Brothers Grimm	Terry Gilliam	
2007	Beowulf	Robert Zemeckis	
2009	Agora	Alejandro Amenábar	
2010	The First Beautiful Thing	Paolo Virzì	
2011	The Jewel	Andrea Molaioli	
2011	The Wholly Family	Terry Gilliam	Short film
2019	The Burnt Orange Heresy	Giuseppe Capotondi	
2026	A Talent for Murder	Anton Corbijn	

=== Television ===
Year	Title	Notes
1984	Aurora	TV film
1985	Il trovatore	TV opera
1990	Norma	TV opera
1995	Solomon and Sheba	TV film
1995	Slave of Dreams	TV film
1996	Cavalleria rusticana	TV opera
1998	Manon Lescaut	TV opera
2011–2013	The Borgias	29 episodes
2014–2016	Penny Dreadful	27 episodes
2021–2023	Domina	16 episodes
2024	The Decameron	8 episodes

== Stage ==
Year	Title	Venue	Notes
1992	La traviata	La Scala	Opera directed by Manuela Crivelli
2001	Un ballo in maschera	Kennedy Centre	Opera directed by Carlo Battistoni
2007	La traviata	La Scala	Opera directed by Manuela Crivelli

Self-appearances
Year	Title	Notes
1994	The 66th Academy Awards	TV special
2001	Sergio Leone: Cinema, Cinema	TV documentary
2002	Lost in La Mancha	TV documentary
2005	Charlie and the Chocolate Factory: Designer Chocolate	TV documentary
2010	XXIV Premios Anuales de la Academia	TV special
2010	Dante Ferretti: Italian Scenographer	TV documentary

== Awards and nominations ==
Major associations

Academy Awards

Year	Category	Nominated work	Result	Ref.
1990	Best Costume Design	The Adventures of Baron Munchausen	Nominated	
1994	Best Costume Design	The Age of Innocence	Won	
2006	Best Costume Design	Charlie and the Chocolate Factory	Nominated	

BAFTA Awards

Year	Category	Nominated work	Result	Ref.
British Academy Film Awards
1985	Best Costume Design	Once Upon a Time in America	Won	
1990	Best Costume Design	The Adventures of Baron Munchausen	Won	
2006	Best Costume Design	Charlie and the Chocolate Factory	Nominated	
British Academy Television Craft Awards
2015	Best Costume Design	Penny Dreadful	Nominated	

Emmy Awards

Year	Category	Nominated work	Result	Ref.
Primetime Emmy Awards
2011	Outstanding Costumes for a Series	The Borgias (Episode: "Lucrezia's Wedding")	Won	
2012	Outstanding Costumes for a Series	The Borgias (Episode: "The Confession")	Nominated	
2013	Outstanding Costumes for a Series	The Borgias (Episode: "The Gunpowder Plot")	Won	

Miscellaneous awards

List of Gabriella Pescucci other awards and nominations
Award	Year (Note: Indicates the year of ceremony. Each year is linked to the article about the awards held that year, wherever possible.)	Category	Title	Result	Ref.
Capri Hollywood International Film Festival	2005	Capri Umberto Tirelli Award	The Brothers Grimm	Won	
César Awards	1993	Best Costume Design	Indochine	Nominated	
César Awards	2000	Best Costume Design	Time Regained	Nominated	
Ciak d'oro	1987	Best Costume Design	The Family	Won	
Ciak d'oro	1990	Best Costume Design	The Adventures of Baron Munchausen	Won	
Ciak d'oro	1997	Best Costume Design	Albergo Roma	Won	
Ciak d'oro	2010	Best Costume Design	The First Beautiful Thing	Won	
Costume Designers Guild Awards	2006	Excellence in Fantasy Film	Charlie and the Chocolate Factory	Nominated	
Costume Designers Guild Awards	2012	Excellence in Period/Fantasy for Television	The Borgias	Nominated	
Costume Designers Guild Awards	2014	Excellence in Period/Fantasy for Television	The Borgias	Nominated	
Costume Designers Guild Awards	2016	Excellence in Period Television	Penny Dreadful	Nominated	
Costume Designers Guild Awards	2017	Excellence in Period Television	Penny Dreadful	Nominated	
David di Donatello Awards	1981	Best Costumes	Three Brothers	Nominated	
David di Donatello Awards	1983	Best Costumes	That Night in Varennes	Won	
David di Donatello Awards	1987	Best Costumes	The Name of the Rose	Won	
David di Donatello Awards	1987	Best Costumes	The Family	Nominated	
David di Donatello Awards	1989	Best Costumes	Splendor	Nominated	
David di Donatello Awards	1994	Best Costumes	For Love, Only for Love	Nominated	
David di Donatello Awards	2010	Best Costumes	The First Beautiful Thing	Nominated	
Goya Awards	2010	Best Costume Design	Agora	Won	
Nastro d'Argento Awards	1975	Best Costume Design	The Murri Affair	Won	
Nastro d'Argento Awards	1976	Best Costume Design	The Divine Nymph	Won	
Nastro d'Argento Awards	1980	Best Costume Design	City of Women	Won	
Nastro d'Argento Awards	1983	Best Costume Design	That Night in Varennes	Nominated	
Nastro d'Argento Awards	1987	Best Costume Design	The Name of the Rose	Won	
Nastro d'Argento Awards	1990	Best Costume Design	The Adventures of Baron Munchausen	Won	
Nastro d'Argento Awards	1994	Best Costume Design	The Age of Innocence	Won	
Nastro d'Argento Awards	1996	Best Costume Design	The Night and the Moment	Nominated	
Nastro d'Argento Awards	2004	Best Costume Design	Lost Love	Nominated	
Nastro d'Argento Awards	2005	Best Costume Design	Van Helsing	Nominated	
Nastro d'Argento Awards	2006	Special Award for costumes	Charlie and the Chocolate Factory	Honored	
Nastro d'Argento Awards	2010	Best Costume Design	Agora and The First Beautiful Thing	Won	
Saturn Awards	1991	Best Costume Design	The Adventures of Baron Munchausen	Nominated	
Saturn Awards	2005	Best Costume Design	Van Helsing	Nominated	
Saturn Awards	2006	Best Costume Design	Charlie and the Chocolate Factory	Nominated	
