= Daniela Ciancio =

Italian costume designer

Daniela Ciancio (born 5 March 1965) is an Italian costume designer, noted chiefly for her film costumes. In 2005, she won the David di Donatello for Best Costumes for her work on the Antonietta De Lillo film Il resto di niente. Ciancio also designed the costumes for the 2013 film La grande bellezza.

== Biography ==
Ciancio graduated high school in 1983, and proceeded to study stage design at the Accademia di Belle Arti di Napoli, earning a diploma in scenography. In 1986, she began a collaboration with the Teatro di San Carlo and the Nuovo Teatro Nuovo di Napoli. In 1994, she was awarded a diploma at the Centro Sperimentale di Cinematografia, winning an internship with Piero Tosi. Her career has spanned cinema, theatre, opera and television.

== Career ==
=== Cinema ===
- The Face of an Angel (directed by Michael Winterbottom, 2014)
- La grande bellezza (Paolo Sorrentino, 2013)
- Il Divo (Paolo Sorrentino, 2008)
- Mission: Impossible III (J. J. Abrams, 2006)
- Il resto di niente (Antonietta De Lillo, 2005)

=== Opera ===
- Cavalleria Rusticana (Roberto de Simone, Teatro di San Carlo, 2007)
- Nabucco with Roberta Guidi di Bagno (S. Vizioli), Choregies d'Orange)
- Romeo and Juliet (D. Deane, Victoria and Albert Hall)

=== Television ===
- L'Oro di Scampia (M. Pontecorvo, 2014)
- Il clan dei Camorristi (A. Angelina and A. Sweet, 2013)
- Applausi e sputi (R. Tognazzi, 2012)
- La nuova squadra - Spaccanapoli (Alberto Bader, 2008)

=== Board service ===
Between 2009 and 2013 Ciancio has been a member of the board of the European Film Academy (EFA), European Film Award – Berlin and she is a jury member of the David di Donatello since 2005.

=== Teaching ===
Since 2004 Ciancio has taught costume design in, among other places, the “Scuola del Cinema Gianmaria Volonte’” (Rome) and “Lab Costume”.

=== Awards and honors ===
Year	Won / Nominated	Award	For
2005	won	David di Donatello for Best Costumes	Il resto di niente
2005	won	Ciak d'oro	Il resto di niente
2005	won	Premio Piero Tosi; Italia Film Festival	Il resto di niente
2005	won	Capitello d'Oro; Sannio Film Festival	Il resto di niente
2005	won	Diamanti al Cinema; CinCinecittà Holding/Kineo	Il resto di niente
2005	won	Diploma honoris causa in Fashion Design; Istituto Europeo di Design	Il resto di niente
2006	nominated	Nastro d'Argento	Il resto di niente
2006	nominated	Premio 35mm	Il resto di niente
2007	won	Cavalleria Rusticana	
2008	won	Premio Umberto Tirelli; Capri/Holliwood	Il Divo
2009	won	Premio Piero Tosi; Italia Film Festival	Il Divo
2009	won	Premio Girulá	Don Giovanni Ritorna dalla Guerra
2009	nominated	David di Donatello	Il Divo
2009	nominated	Ciak d'oro	Il Divo
2013	nominated	Nastro d'Argento	La grande bellezza
