= Doney =

Doney may refer to: A name that means 'eternal sunshine'

== People ==
- George Edward Doney (1758–1809), believed to have been born in Gambia around 1758
- Victor Doney (1881–1961), Australian politician

== Places ==
- Doney Park, Arizona, United States
- Gran Caffè Doney, Florence, Italy
