= Peter Taylor (film editor) =

English film editor (1922–1997)

- Born: Peter John Brough Taylor; 28 February 1922; Portsmouth, England
- Died: 17 December 1997 (aged 75); Rome, Italy
- Occupation: Film editor
- Years active: 1942–1991
- Awards: Oscar Award (1957)

Peter Taylor (18 February 1922 – 17 December 1997) was an English film editor with more than 30 credits. Perhaps his best remembered contribution is the editing of the 1957 film The Bridge on the River Kwai.

In his obituary for Taylor, Tony Sloman gives several examples to illustrate Taylor's editing. He writes:

By 1963 the British New Wave had beached, and Peter Taylor edited the superb This Sporting Life, the debut feature of the cine-literate director Lindsay Anderson. It is a remarkable study of working-class angst, with a cutting style like no other British feature before it, an ever-underrated achievement by Taylor, as Anderson received all the credit, as directors do. This Sporting Life remains, with The Bridge on the River Kwai, the supreme testament to Peter Taylor's craft and talent.

Taylor won an Academy Award for Best Film Editing for The Bridge on the River Kwai (1957), which was placed as the 36th best American film ever made in the 2007 American Film Institute listing. David Lean directed the film, about whom Ken Dancyger has noted that, "Lean may have made few films, but his influence has far exceeded those numbers. The role of editing in his films may help explain that influence." Lean himself had begun his own career as a film editor. Sloman comments on the relationship of Lean, Taylor, and the film's editing:

...film industry wags may assert that the editing Oscar came with the letter of engagement on a David Lean film - and in later years it is certainly true that Lean, a former editor, would himself dictate the precise nature of the cutting - none the less, Peter Taylor had served a long apprenticeship with Lean. His Oscar for Kwai was an honest vindication of his talent, for Taylor physically edited the film into shape, working closely with Lean only on the final cut.

Taylor moved to Rome, Italy around 1966. He edited three films with Italian director Franco Zeffirelli; both La Traviata (1983) and Otello (1986) were nominated for the BAFTA Award for Best Foreign Film.

== Selected filmography ==
The director of each film is indicated within the parentheses.

- Hobson's Choice (1954-David Lean)
- For Better, for Worse (1954-J. Lee Thompson). Thompson's third film as a director.
- Summertime (1955-David Lean)
- Portrait of Alison (1956-Guy Green)
- The Man Who Never Was (1956-Ronald Neame)
- The Bridge on the River Kwai (1957-David Lean)
- Luna de Miel or Honeymoon (1959-Michael Powell)
- The Mark (1961-Guy Green)
- Waltz of the Toreadors (1962-John Guillermin)
- This Sporting Life (1963-Lindsay Anderson)
- One Way Pendulum (1963-Peter Yates)
- Judith (1966-Daniel Mann)
- The Taming of the Shrew (1967-Franco Zeffirelli)
- Anzio (1968-Edward Dmytryk)
- Fangio: Una vita a 300 all'ora (1971-Hugh Hudson)
- La Traviata (1982-Franco Zeffirelli)
- Otello (1986-Franco Zeffirelli)
- The Penitent (1988-Cliff Osmond)

== See also ==
- List of film director and editor collaborations
