= Carmen Sheila =

Brazilian voice actress (1944–2024)

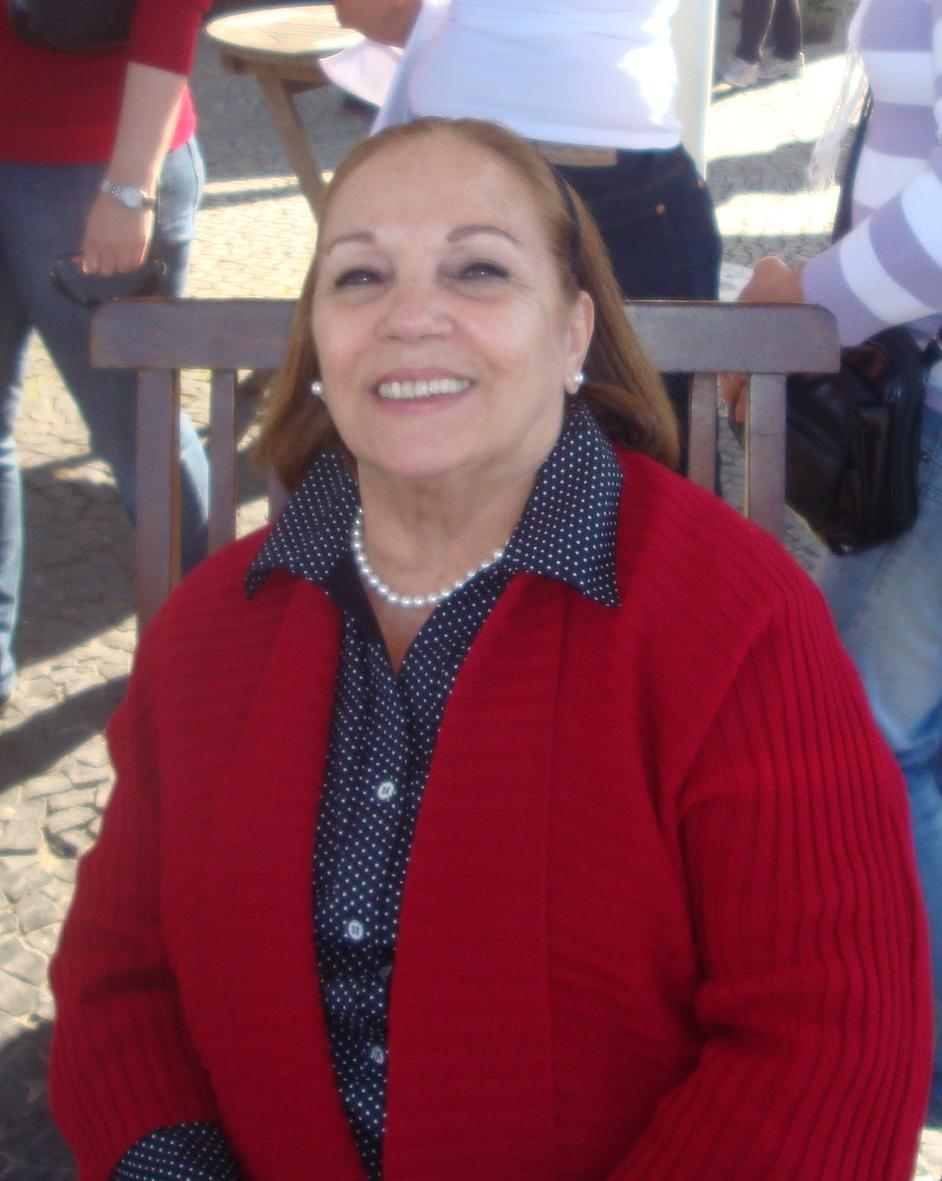
- Sheila in 2011
- Born: 23 May 1944; Rio de Janeiro, Federal District, Brazil
- Died: 16 May 2024 (aged 79); Rio de Janeiro, Rio de Janeiro, Brazil
- Occupation: Voice actress
- Years active: 1958–2024
- Notable work: Toy Story, The Lion King, Star Wars

Sheila da Silva e Souza (23 May 1944 – 16 May 2024), better known as Carmen Sheila, was a Brazilian voice actress.

== Early life and early career ==
Born Sheila da Silva e Souza in Rio de Janeiro on 23 May 1944, Carmen Sheila began her career by joining the Rio de Janeiro radio in 1958. In 1960, she entered the field of dubbing.

== Career ==
Sheila was the Brazilian voice of Cher in the films Tea with Mussolini and The Witches of Eastwick. She dubbed Shenzi in The Lion King. Sheila also dubbed actors, including Susan Sarandon in The Client; Jessica Lange in American Horror Story; Halle Berry in Boomerang and The Last Boy Scout; Carrie Fisher in Scream 3; and Kathy Bates in Titanic. Her dubbing credits include Dee Dee in Dexter's Laboratory, Mrs. Potato Head (Sra. Cabeça de Batata) in Toy Story, Elmyra (Felícia) in Tiny Toon Adventures, Mystique (Mística) in X-Men and X-Men: The Last Stand, Berta in Two and a Half Men, Huey (Huguinho) in DuckTales, Cheetara in ThunderCats, Sgt. Emily Hart/Steelheart in SilverHawks, Atsuko Urameshi in YuYu Hakusho, Delphine in Power Rangers, and Princess Leia in Star Wars.

== Death ==
Sheila died in Rio de Janeiro on 16 May 2024, aged 79.
