= Gran Caffè Doney =

Cafeteria in Italy

Coordinates: 43°46′15.13″N 11°15′5.56″E

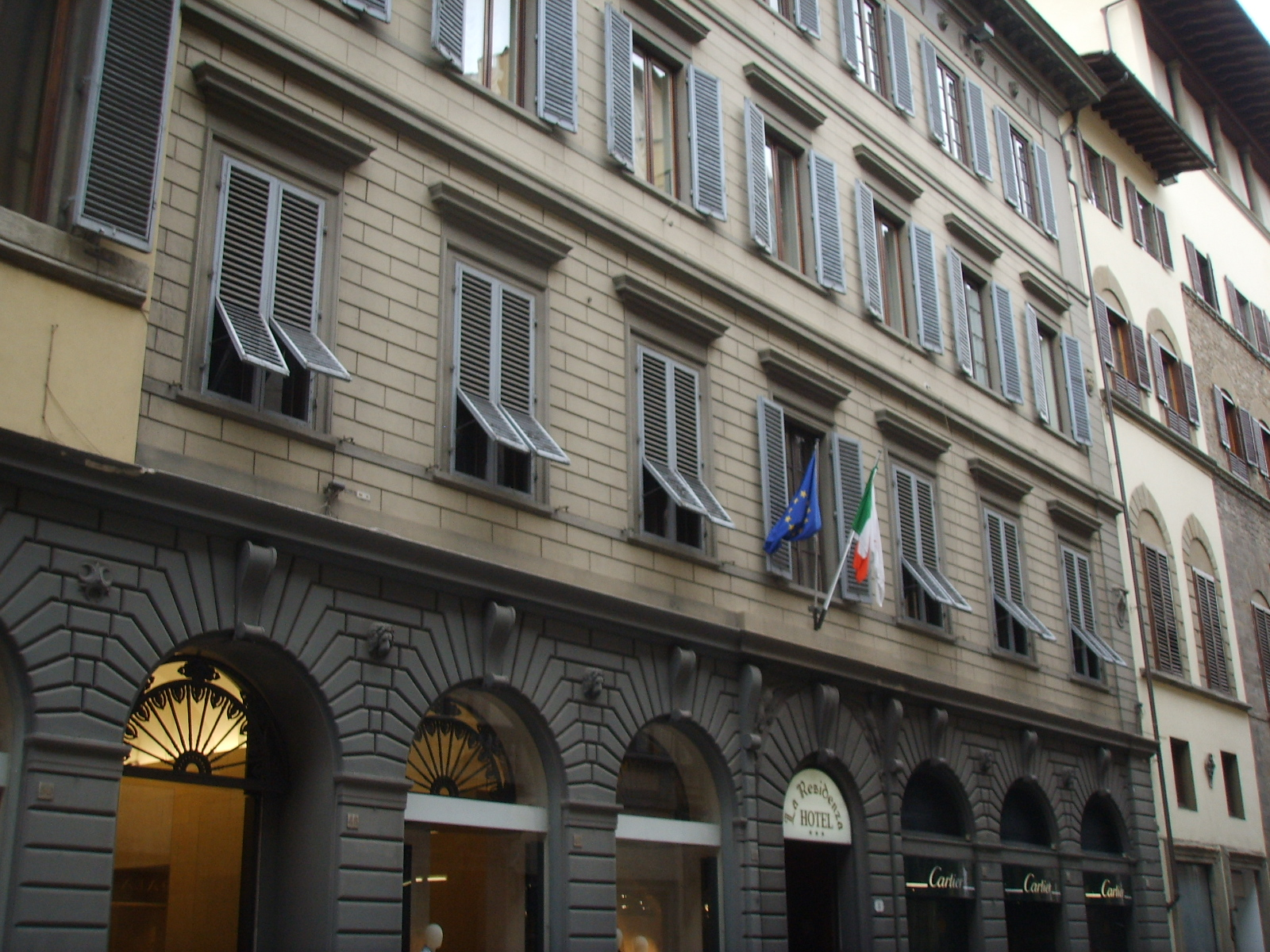
Exterior of the former Gran Caffè Doney in Florence

Gran Caffè Doney or Doney's was a cafeteria in Florence established in the 1850s by Gasparo Doney, a French nobleman discharged from Napoleon's army, who opened a French Patisserie, originally located at via del Castellaccio and then moved on Via Tornabuoni, near the British Consulate. In the 19th century, the Italian-English son-in-law Giacomo Thompson expanded the business by opening the Caffè Ristorante Doney at the Palazzina Reale della Cascine in the Cascine Park. The Doney was favoured by aristocracy and upper middle-class, particularly by British citizens living in Florence, such as The Scorpioni.

When Benito Mussolini attacked Abyssinia (now Ethiopia), the British expressed their public disapproval. This led to some outbreaks of Fascist violence at the Gran Caffè Doney in 1935–36.

The most famous customers of Gran Caffè Doney were socialite Violet Trefusis who was an acquaintance of Mussolini himself, and a group of elderly English ladies called The Scorpioni who resided in Florence between the World Wars.

The cafeteria closed down in 1986.

Gran Caffè Doney is also one of the main settings in Franco Zeffirelli's autobiographical film Tea with Mussolini.

== See also ==
- The Scorpioni
- Tea with Mussolini
