= Teresa Stratas =

Canadian-American operatic soprano

Teresa Stratas OC FRCMT(hon)
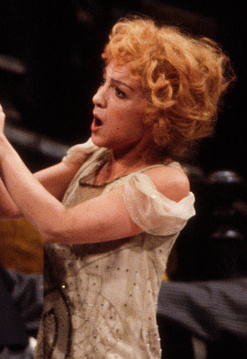
- Teresa Stratas in 1984
- Born: Anastasia Stratakis; 26 May 1938 (age 88); Oshawa, Ontario, Canada
- Education: The Royal Conservatory of Music
- Occupations: Opera Soprano, actress
- Honours: Order of Canada; The Royal Conservatory of Music

Teresa Stratas OC FRCMT(hon) (born Anastasia Stratakis on May 26, 1938) is a retired Canadian operatic soprano and actress of Greek descent. She is especially well known for her award-winning recording of Alban Berg's Lulu.

== Early life and career ==
Stratas was born to a struggling immigrant Cretan family in Oshawa, near Toronto, Ontario. At age 13, she performed Greek pop songs on the radio. She graduated from The Royal Conservatory of Music in Toronto where she studied singing with Irene Jessner. At age 20, Stratas made her professional opera debut as Mimì in La bohème at the Toronto Opera Festival. One year later in 1959, she co-won the Metropolitan Opera National Council Auditions, appearing later that year with the Metropolitan Opera as Poussette in Manon. She created the title role in Peggy Glanville-Hicks' Nausicaa at the Herod Atticus Theatre in Athens in 1961, made her Covent Garden debut as Mimì that same year and in 1962, she made her La Scala debut as Isabella in Manuel de Falla's Atlántida. She continued her career with the Metropolitan Opera, moved into leading roles and performed with leading opera houses around the world, including the Bolshoi, Vienna State, Berlin, Bavarian State (Munich), Paris, San Francisco and at the Salzburg Festival.

Her repertoire also included Zerlina in Don Giovanni, Despina in Così fan tutte, Cherubino and Susanna in The Marriage of Figaro, Liù in Turandot, Cio-Cio-San in Madama Butterfly, Micaëla in Carmen, Marguerite in Faust, the title role in La Périchole, Gretel in Hansel and Gretel, Lisa in The Queen of Spades, The Composer in Ariadne auf Naxos, Antonia in The Tales of Hoffmann, Mélisande in Pelléas et Mélisande, Marenka in The Bartered Bride, Desdemona in Otello, Mme Lidoine in Dialogues of the Carmelites, the title roles of Salome and Lulu, Jenny Smith in Rise and Fall of the City of Mahagonny (directed by John Dexter) and Marie Antoinette in John Corigliano's The Ghosts of Versailles. She is regarded as one of the foremost singing actresses of the twentieth century.

In March 1962, she appeared as a contestant on the CBS Game Show To Tell the Truth. Stratas and two other contestants had to convince the panelists that each of them was the real Teresa Stratas. Dorothy Kilgallen and Johnny Carson appeared on the episode as panelists along with Tom Poston and Dina Merrill. None of the panelists believed Stratas was really herself; giving all three contestants the top $1,000 prize to split among themselves and each received a carton of Salem cigarettes, the brand sponsoring the program.

== Career highlights ==
Among her career highlights was the creation of the role of Sardulla in the US premiere of Menotti's The Last Savage (Met, 1964). In 1974, she made a film (directed by Götz Friedrich) of Strauss's Salome with the Vienna Philharmonic under Karl Böhm. Pierre Boulez chose her to sing the title role in the first performance of Friedrich Cerha's completed version of Alban Berg's Lulu (Paris, 1979). In 1981 she performed the role of Mimi in La bohème at the Metropolitan Opera in New York. On 26 September 1989, she sang all three soprano roles in Puccini's Trittico, Giorgetta in Il tabarro, Angelica in Suor Angelica and Lauretta in Gianni Schicchi (Met). She created the role of Marie Antoinette in the premiere of John Corigliano's The Ghosts of Versailles (Met, 1991). At the opening night of the Met's 1994 season, she sang Nedda in Pagliacci opposite Luciano Pavarotti and Giorgetta in Il tabarro opposite Plácido Domingo.

Over the course of her thirty-six year career at the Metropolitan Opera, she appeared in 385 performances of 41 different roles. Her most frequently performed roles at the house include Liu in Turandot (27 performances between 1961 and 1995), Nedda in Pagliacci (27 performances between 1963 and 1994) and Mimì in La bohème (26 performances between 1962 and 1982). Her final performance with the company was on December 9, 1995, as Jenny in Rise and Fall of the City of Mahagonny. She was engaged to sing Marenka in a revival of The Bartered Bride during the 1996–97 season, but withdrew from the production prior to opening night, and never appeared at the Metropolitan again.

While rehearsing for Mahagonny in 1979, Stratas met the originator of her role, Lotte Lenya, who was also Kurt Weill's widow. Lenya gave her the scores of previously unpublished Weill songs which she had hoarded until that time, some of which Stratas later recorded on two albums, The Unknown Kurt Weill and Stratas Sings Weill.

She also starred in several film adaptations of operas, including Salome (1974), Amahl and the Night Visitors (1978), The Bartered Bride (1975), Pagliacci (1982) and La traviata (1983).

In 1988, she recorded the role of Julie La Verne in EMI's 3-CD set of the complete score of Kern and Hammerstein's classic musical Show Boat, conducted by John McGlinn. Also starring with her were Frederica Von Stade as Magnolia, Jerry Hadley as Gaylord Ravenal, and Bruce Hubbard as Joe. This was the first complete recording of the score, using Robert Russell Bennett's original 1927 orchestrations, Will Vodery's vocal arrangements, and all of Oscar Hammerstein II's uncensored lyrics. Critics acclaimed it as the finest recording of Show Boat ever made.

In the 1980s Stratas travelled to Calcutta and worked with Mother Teresa in an orphanage and at the Kalighat Home for the Dying. In the 1990s she again took time from her career to move into a Romanian hospital to clean cots and wash and care for the sick and dying orphans.

On September 25, 2008, Teresa Stratas returned to New York for an interview with the Metropolitan Opera Guild, her first public appearance in over a decade. She lives in Florida.

== Awards and recognition ==
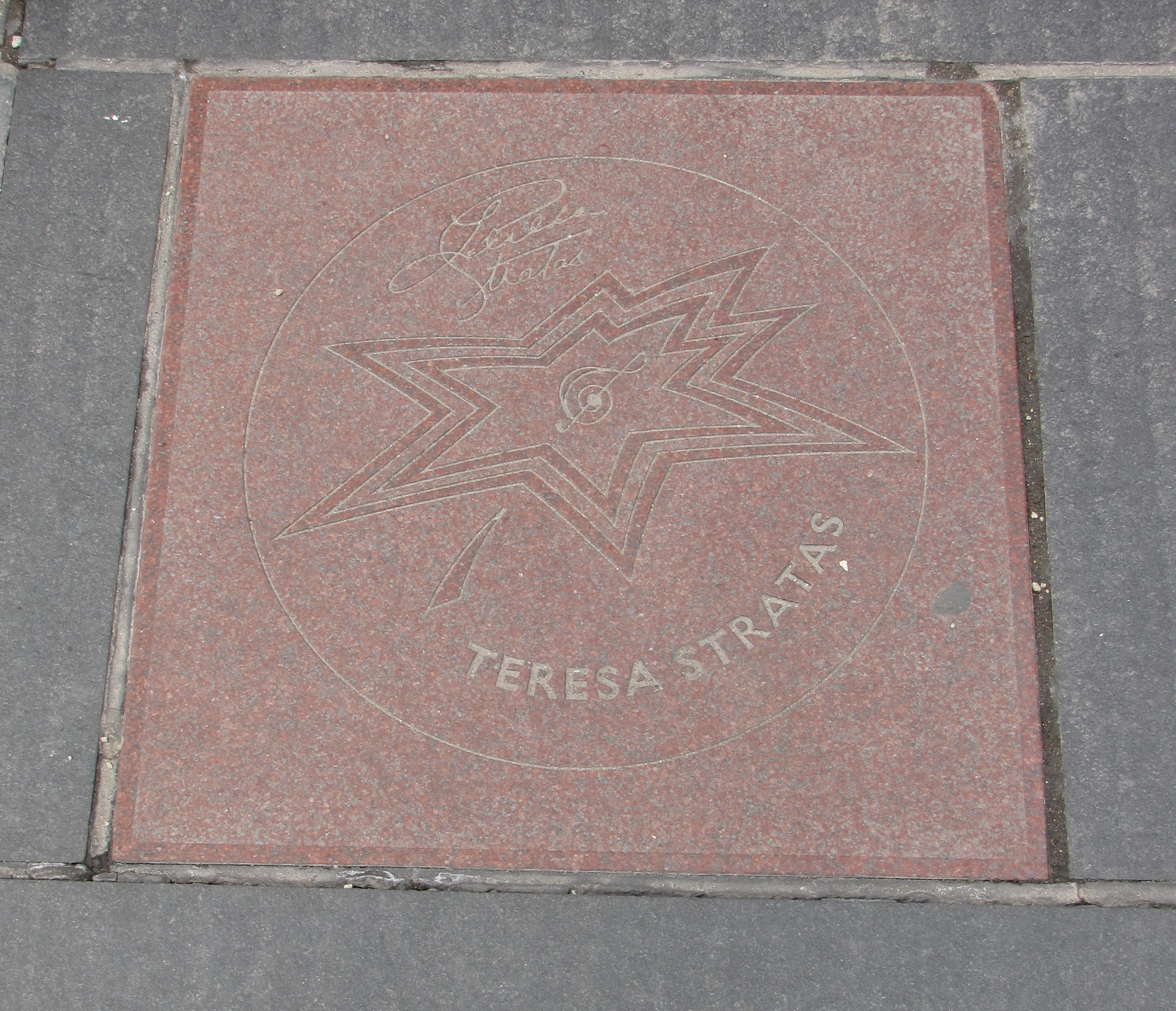
Stratas's star on Canada's Walk of Fame

- Grammy Awards & Grammy nominations
  - Grammy Award for Best Opera Recording and Grammy Award for Best Classical Album for Alban Berg's Lulu (1981)
  - Grammy Award for Best Opera Recording for Verdi's La traviata (1984)
- Drama Desk Award for Outstanding Actress – Musical for Rags (1987)
- Nominee for Tony Award for Best Leading Actress in a Musical for Rags (1987)
- Officer of the Order of Canada (1972)
- Artist of the Year Canadian Music Council (1980)
- Honorary LL D (McMaster University) (1986)
- Honorary LL D (University of Toronto) (1994)
- Honorary LL D (Eastman School of Music) (1998)
- Honorary D LITT (York University) (2000)
- Governor General's Performing Arts Award for Lifetime Artistic Achievement (2000)
- Star in Canada's Walk of Fame (2001)
- MasterWorks recipient for Alban Berg's Lulu (2005)

== Discography ==
- Alban Berg, Lulu, Stratas, Yvonne Minton, Hanna Schwarz, Franz Mazura, Kenneth Riegel, Robert Tear, Orchestre de l'Opéra de Paris, cond. Pierre Boulez, Deutsche Grammophon, 1981
- Teresa Stratas – The Unknown Kurt Weill, Nonesuch 79019
- Stratas Sings Weill, Nonesuch 79131
- September Songs: The Music of Kurt Weill, Sony Classical, 1997
- Verdi, La traviata. Stratas, Fritz Wunderlich, Hermann Prey. Cond. Giuseppe Patanè. Orfeo, 1965. Live performance.
- Peggy Glanville-Hicks: Nausicaa, Scenes from the Opera. Stratas, Athens Symphony Orchestra & Chorus
- Jerome Kern, Show Boat (1988 cast album). Stratas, Frederica von Stade, Jerry Hadley & Lillian Gish. Ambrosian Chorus and London Sinfonietta, conductor John McGlinn, EMI, 1988
- Lehár, Die lustig Witwe. Stratas, Zoltán Kelemen, Elizabeth Harwood, René Kollo, Werner Hollweg, Berliner Philharmoniker, conductor Herbert von Karajan, Deutsche Grammophon, 1973
- Lehár, Der Zarewitsch. Stratas, Wiesław Ochman, Paul Esser, Lukas Ammann, Harald Juhnke & Birke Bruck. Symphonie–Orchester Kurt Graunke, conductor Willy Mattes, DVD, Deutsche Grammophon/Unitel Classica 00440 073 4314, 1973

== Filmography ==
- Giuditta (1970) – Stratas, Schock – operetta F. Lehar (movie made in Germany)
- Paganini (1973) – Stratas, Theba – operetta F. Léhar directed by Wolfgang Ebert (movie made in Germany)
- Der Zarewitsch (1973) – Stratas, Ochman – operetta F. Lehar (movie made in Germany) directed by Arthur Maria Rabenalt
- Salome (1974) – title role, conducted by Karl Böhm, directed by Götz Friedrich
- The Bartered Bride (1978) – with Nicolai Gedda, and Jon Vickers, directed by John Dexter
- Amahl and The Night Visitors (1978) - with Robert Sapolsky, Willard White, Giorgio Tozzi and Nico Castel
- Rise and Fall of the City of Mahagonny (1979) – with Astrid Varnay and Richard Cassilly, directed by Dexter
- La bohème (1981) – as Mimì, with José Carreras and Renata Scotto, directed by Franco Zeffirelli
- Pagliacci (1982) – as Nedda, with Domingo, directed by Zeffirelli
- La traviata (1983) – as Violetta, with Domingo and Cornell MacNeil, directed by Zeffirelli
- Stratasphere: Portrait of Teresa Stratas (1989) – documentary
- Così fan tutte . Stratas, Edita Gruberová, Luis Lima, Ferruccio Furlanetto, Delores Ziegler, Vienna Philharmonic, conductor Nikolaus Harnoncourt. Directed by Jean-Pierre Ponnelle. Deutsche Grammophon
- The Blasphemers' Banquet (1989)
- The Ghosts of Versailles (1991) – Stratas, Fleming, Horne, Hagegård, G. Quilico, Berberian, Met Opera, conductor James Levine. Directed by Colin Graham
- Under the Piano (1996) – Teresa Stratas, Amanda Plummer, Megan Follows. Directed by Stefan Scaini
- The Canadians (1961) Western starring Robert Ryan as a Mountie and directed by Burt Kennedy. Filmed in Canada.

== See also ==
- Mozart: Così fan tutte (Alain Lombard recording)
