= Carlo Poggioli =

Italian costume designer

Carlo Poggioli is an Italian costume designer.

== Biography ==
Poggioli studied and graduated in stage and costume design at the Istituto D'Arte and the Accademia di Belle Arti in Naples.

After completing his studies, Poggioli worked in Rome as assistant for some of the most important Italian costume designers, including Gabriella Pescucci, Piero Tosi, Maurizio Millenotti. He worked on such major productions as Jean-Jacques Annaud's The Name of the Rose, Terry Gilliam's The Adventures of Baron Munchausen, Federico Fellini's The Voice of the Moon, Martin Scorsese's The Age of Innocence, Franco Zeffirelli's Sparrow, and more. He also worked alongside Ann Roth as assistant on The English Patient and, as associate designer on The Talented Mr. Ripley, directed by Anthony Minghella.

In opera productions, Poggioli worked with director Liliana Cavani (La Traviata, La Scala), Mauro Bolognini (Norma, Teatro Bellini di Catania), Franco Zeffirelli (Aida and Boheme, Teatro dell' Opera di Roma and Tel Aviv Opera House). He designed costumes for productions directed by Ruggero Cappuccio and orchestras directed by Riccardo Muti, including Falstaff (La Scala), Nina ossia La pazza per amore (Teatro Alla Scala e Piccolo di Milano), and Il ritorno di Don Calandrino, at the Salzburg Opera Theatre.

As a costume designer for television and film, Poggioli has designed costumes for Marquise directed by Vera Belmont, Nick Willing's Jason and the Argonauts, The Mists of Avalon, directed by Uli Edel, Cold Mountain, directed by Anthony Minghella, Van Helsing, directed by Steven Sommers, Doom directed by Andrzej Bartkowiak, The Fine Art of Love, directed by John Irvin, The Inquiry directed by Giulio Base, The Brothers Grimm, directed by Terry Gilliam, The Palace, directed by Roman Polanski, and many more.

== Recognition ==
- 2008 Genie Award for Best Achievement in Costume Design – Silk – Won (with Kazuko Kurosawa)
- 2005 Saturn Award for Best Costumes – Van Helsing – Nominated (with Gabriella Pescucci)
- 2005 Silver Ribbon for Best Costume Design – Van Helsing – Nominated (with Gabriella Pescucci)
- 2004 BAFTA Award for Best Costume Design – Cold Mountain – Nominated (with Ann Roth)
- 2002 Emmy Award for Outstanding Costumes for a Miniseries, Movie or a Special – The Mists of Avalon – Nominated (with Giovanni Casalnuovo and Lindsay Pugh)
