= Otello (1986 film) =

1986 film

- Theatrical release poster
- Directed by: Franco Zeffirelli
- Screenplay by: adaptation: Franco Zeffirelli; Masolino D'Amico
- Based on: Othello (play) by William Shakespeare; Otello (libretto) by Arrigo Boito
- Produced by: Yoram Globus; Menahem Golan; John Thompson
- Starring: Plácido Domingo; Katia Ricciarelli; Justino Díaz
- Cinematography: Ennio Guarnieri
- Edited by: Peter Taylor
- Music by: Giuseppe Verdi (from Otello)
- Distributed by: Cannon Films
- Release date: 28 August 1986
- Running time: 122 minutes
- Countries: Italy; Netherlands
- Language: Italian

Otello is a 1986 film based on the Giuseppe Verdi opera of the same name, which was itself based on the Shakespearean play Othello. The film was directed by Franco Zeffirelli and starred Plácido Domingo in the title role, Katia Ricciarelli as Desdemona and Justino Díaz as Iago. For the film's soundtrack, Lorin Maazel conducted the Orchestra and Chorus of the Teatro alla Scala. The film premiered in West Germany on 28 August 1986 and received a U.S. theatrical release on 12 September 1986. It was nominated for a Bafta Award and a Golden Globe for Best Foreign Language Film.

== Plot ==
With only a few exceptions, the film follows the same plot as the opera. Iago plots and brings about Otello's downfall by convincing him that his wife Desdemona is engaged in an affair with the young lieutenant Cassio, provoking Otello to murder her in a blind rage. However, in a major change from the opera, Otello kills Iago at the end by throwing a spear at him, while in the stage version he only wounds him with his sword.

== Cast ==
- Plácido Domingo as Otello
- Katia Ricciarelli as Desdemona
- Justino Díaz as Iago
- Petra Malakova as Emilia
- Urbano Barberini as Cassio
- Massimo Foschi as Lodovico
- Edwin Francis as Montano
- Sergio Nicolai as Roderigo
- Remo Remotti as Brabantio
- Antonio Pierfederici as Doge

== Production ==
Menahem Golan and Yoram Globus of Cannon Films worked out a deal with popular operatic tenor Plácido Domingo to finance him in a film version of an opera. They wanted the singer to appear in an adaptation of Verdi's Il trovatore. Domingo, however, suggested instead that they film Otello, his signature role. While working with Italian director Franco Zeffirelli on a stage production of Tosca at the Metropolitan Opera, Domingo discussed the possibility of collaborating again on another opera film. They had previously made television versions of Cavalleria rusticana and Pagliacci together, as well as a theatrically released film of Verdi's La Traviata. Zeffirelli agreed to direct Domingo in Otello.

Shooting was scheduled to begin in 1985 at Heraklion, Crete. Soon before the filming was to start, Mexico City was devastated by a massive earthquake. Domingo cancelled all his engagements in order to help with rescue efforts. Once the project came close to being scrapped, Domingo agreed to appear in Crete for the filming. Zeffirelli later recalled that the tenor used his hard work on Otello to help forget the traumatic sights in Mexico of the injured and dead (which included some of his family members).

== Music ==
For the most part, the film follows the original score of the opera with several noticeable exceptions. The entire "Willow Song" ("Salce, salce"), Desdemona's solo aria, which is largely considered one of the most beautiful moments in the work, is omitted. However, her "Ave Maria", which follows immediately, is retained in the film. There are, at various points, smaller additional cuts in the music, such as the moment at the end of the storm scene when the chorus is cut short and the film skips to the recitativo between Iago and Roderigo. This contrasts with stage productions of Otello, where the opera is rarely cut. There are also two additions: the extra music from the rarely performed third act ballet (written for the opera's Paris premiere) is inserted into the festivities of the first and third acts in the film.

In some scenes, Zeffirelli was able to use the medium of film to show aspects of his interpretation that could not be done onstage. In the movie, when Iago is informing Otello about Cassio's supposed dream in which he apparently said to Desdemona, "Let us hide our loves", we see Cassio singing the words, not Iago, as in the original stage version. Here Zeffirelli is showing the audience the image of Iago's fabricated dream as Otello is imagining it. Another of Zeffirelli's interpretive decisions was to show, complete with screams and sound effects, a flashback of marauding soldiers attacking an African village and snatching Otello (as a baby) from his mother, while the adult Otello and Desdemona sing their Act I love duet.

On the soundtrack album of the opera, released by EMI, the music is presented with no cuts or additions, as it is when Otello is performed on the stage. The soundtrack album, however, has not proved to be as popular as Plácido Domingo's first recording of the opera, conducted by James Levine and released in 1978 by RCA Victor.

== Reception ==
Otello was named Best Foreign Film of 1986 by the U.S. National Board of Review of Motion Pictures. It was nominated for a Bafta Award for the Best Foreign Language Film in 1987, but the award was won by Akira Kurosawa's Ran. In the same category, it was also nominated for a Golden Globe. It was nominated for an Academy Award for Best Costume Design but lost to A Room with a View. The film was also entered into the 1986 Cannes Film Festival.

Leonard Maltin, in his Movie and Video Guide, called the film "nearly flawless". Vincent Canby in The New York Times, however, criticized Zeffirelli for some of his alterations to the opera's music. In an interview in Opera News, the film's star, Plácido Domingo, expressed similar displeasure in the movie's musical cuts. He also complained that the synchronization of the soundtrack with the film was improperly done, rendering the music half a step lower than it was recorded. In regard to his interpretation of Otello, he felt that some camera cutaways undermined what he was trying to express in his characterization. Overall, he deemed it a "good film" that "could have been better".

Stanley Kauffmann of The New Republic when reviewing Otello in 1986 described the movie as Franco Zeffirelli's best film.

== See also ==
- Shakespeare on screen
