= The Remains of Nothing =

2004 film by Antonietta De Lillo

- Directed by: Antonietta De Lillo
- Written by: Giuseppe Rocca
- Starring: Maria de Medeiros
- Cinematography: Cesare Accetta
- Edited by: Giogiò Franchini
- Music by: Daniele Sepe
- Release date: 2004
- Country: Italy
- Language: Italian

The Remains of Nothing (Italian: Il resto di niente) is a 2004 Italian historical drama film directed by Antonietta De Lillo.

It was screened out of competition at the 61st Venice International Film Festival. It won the David di Donatello Award for Best Costume Design (to Daniela Ciancio).

== Cast ==
- Maria de Medeiros as Eleonora
- Imma Villa as Graziella
- Rosario Sparno as Gennaro
- Raffaele Di Florio as Vincenzo Sanges
- Riccardo Zinna as Pasquale Tria
- Maria Grazia Grassini as Donna Vovò Fonseca
- Enzo Moscato as Gaetano Filangieri
- Cesare Belsito as King Ferdinand
- Giulia Weber as Maria Carolina
- Nunzia Di Somma as Luisa Sanfelice
- Ivan Polidoro as Vincenzo Cuoco
- Raffaele Esposito as Domenico Cirillo
- Emi Salvador as Ciro Pulcinella

== See also ==
- List of Italian films of 2004
