= Callas Forever =

- Poster for the US release
- Directed by: Franco Zeffirelli
- Screenplay by: Franco Zeffirelli; Martin Sherman
- Story by: Franco Zeffirelli
- Starring: Fanny Ardant; Jeremy Irons; Joan Plowright
- Cinematography: Ennio Guarnieri
- Edited by: Sean Barton
- Music by: Alessio Vlad
- Release date: 2002
- Countries: Italy; France; Spain; United Kingdom; Romania
- Languages: English; French; Italian

Callas Forever is a 2002 biographical film directed by Franco Zeffirelli, who co-wrote the screenplay with Martin Sherman. It is an homage to Zeffirelli's friend, internationally acclaimed opera diva Maria Callas, whom he directed on stage in Norma, La traviata, and Tosca. It was his last film before his death in 2019.

== Plot ==
The partially fictionalized film is set in 1977, the year in which Callas died, and centers on the making of a movie of Georges Bizet's Carmen. The diva, whose now-ragged voice is well past its prime, is persuaded to star in it by longtime friend and former manager Larry Kelly, who abandoned classical music to become a rock impresario. He insists by lip-synching to her old recording she will recapture her lost youth and leave behind a priceless legacy for her admirers, and his theory is supported by Callas confidante and journalist Sarah Keller.

Other characters include Michael, a handsome young painter of limited talent and ardent Callas fan with whom Larry is infatuated; Marco, the tenor who plays Don José in Carmen and flirts with his aging co-star, who responds to his advances; and Bruna, the housekeeper in Callas' Paris apartment.

Callas' passion for music and faith in herself are restored by the finished film. She refuses to lip-synch more filmed operas but agrees to star in a screen adaptation of Tosca if it is filmed live, using her own voice. When the financial backers walk out and the contract is canceled, she demands that Larry destroy Carmen, arguing its release would be contrary to her legacy of honest performances, even those she delivered on really awful nights when her fans wanted to close their ears and hide their eyes with embarrassment and disappointment.

== Production notes ==
The film was made in Bucharest, Romania, Córdoba in Andalusia, Spain, and Paris.

The costume designs were nominated for a Goya Award in Spain and a Silver Ribbon by the Italian National Syndicate of Film Journalists.

The film grossed $445,996 in the US, €1,249,657 in Italy, and €278,631 in Spain. It is available on DVD.

== Principal cast ==
- Fanny Ardant as Maria Callas
- Jeremy Irons as Larry Kelly
- Joan Plowright as Sarah Keller
- Jay Rodan as Michael
- Gabriel Garko as Marco
- Anna Lelio as Bruna
- Stephen Billington as Brendan
- Justino Díaz as a singer (Scarpia)
- Tara Marie Anderson as the Blonde Journalist

== Principal production credits ==
- Executive Producers ..... Marco Chimenz, Giovanni Stabilini
- Original Music ..... Alessio Vlad
- Cinematography ..... Ennio Guarnieri
- Production Design ..... Carlo Centolavigna, Bruno Cesari
- Art Direction ..... Luigi Quintili
- Costume Design ..... Karl Lagerfeld, Anna Anni, Alessandro Lai, Alberto Spiazzi

== Critical reception ==
In his review in The New York Times, Stephen Holden called it "the kind of what-if movie you might have expected to be made about Elvis Presley but not about the quintessential opera diva of the 20th century. A lip-synching hall of mirrors, it is essentially a piece of highbrow karaoke . . . Ms. Ardant displays an eerie command of the diva's body language: the way her lips could curl into an imperious sneer, her flame-throwing glare, her hands crossed prayerfully on her chest as she sank to her knees in agony. Yet there is something inescapably ghoulish in the spectacle of an actress (even a great one) lip-synching the role of an opera legend who is herself lip-synching to her old records to create a bogus product . . . If Callas Forever is compellingly acted . . . it is a skimpily produced movie that looks pasted together on a limited budget. The la-di-da ambience of divas and their courtiers rings true for its era, but the fussy hothouse atmosphere of unrestrained diva-worship is ultimately more than a little stifling."

Roger Ebert of the Chicago Sun-Times stated, "The visual style is all Zeffirelli, and it is interesting that the opera-within-the-film is not skimped on, as is usually the case in films containing scenes from other productions. Indeed, most of the budget seems to have gone to the moments of Carmen that we see; they look sumptuous and robust, and the surrounding film looks, well, like a low-budget art movie . . . Ardant . . . [has] the fiery passion needed for Carmen . . . [and] excels at playing a temperamental diva."

In Variety, Deborah Young described the film as "an impressionistic sketch" and added, "Opera buffs may be disappointed not to see their heroine depicted in her heyday, and casual viewers may be miffed not to get a melodramatic replay of her affair with Aristotle Onassis . . . [the] main body of the movie is weighed down by flat, expository dialogue and a lot of pedestrian filming . . . however . . . the Carmen sequences, which make up a sizable chunk of the film and are far and away the pic's most exhilarating sections, are graceful and fluid."

In The Guardian, Peter Bradshaw called it "a gallant, ghastly fantasy" and added, "half a pound of Roquefort left overnight in a glove compartment could not be cheesier. It's a camp extravaganza of such exquisite awfulness, such unembarrassable silliness, that you watch it hypnotised."

Mark Kermode of The Observer said it was "directed by Zeffirelli like a man still living in the Seventies, replete with ostentatious zooms and unfashionably smouldering close-ups."

Mick LaSalle of the San Francisco Chronicle enthused, "For Callas lovers, it doesn't get much better than this. The movie is rich with music and more than a few moments of painful exaltation, where the breath catches, the eyes fill and the skin tingles . . . Yet a familiarity with Callas or opera in general is hardly required for appreciating this film. Though campy at times, Callas Forever is a generous offering, full of flamboyant characters and grand performances . . . [the Callas Zeffirelli] gives us [is] a woman blessed and cursed by a terrible gift that makes normal life meaningless, while giving her a glimpse into a transcendence that eludes her. There are other ways of presenting Callas, but this is an especially powerful one."

In The New York Observer, Rex Reed opined, "You will go away devastated and raving about the great French actress Fanny Ardant as Callas. It's a titanic performance that redefines the term "tour de force."

Kevin Thomas of the Los Angeles Times called it "not only one of Zeffirelli's sumptuous productions but also a film that celebrates the sacredness of artistic integrity that to Zeffirelli Callas embodied fully . . . Ardant comes fully into her own in her portrayal of a great artist . . . [she] is a boldly striking beauty with a commanding star charisma . . . as an actress she has delved so deeply within herself that she doesn't have to resemble Callas closely because she has become her from frame one."
