= Eugenia Calosso =

Italian composer and conductor

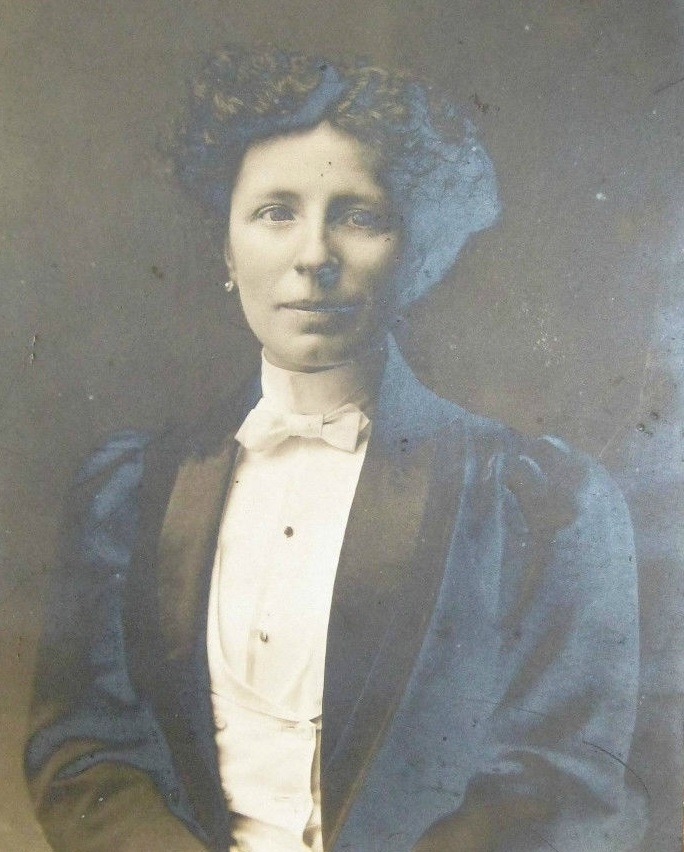
Eugenia Calosso

Eugenia Calosso (21 April 1878 – after 1914) was an Italian conductor and composer. She studied at the conservatory in Leipzig, and studied composition with Giovanni Cravero. She began her career as a conductor at the Casino Municipale in San Remo and continued concert tours of Europe until 1914. Calosso wrote madrigals, orchestral suites, and instrumental works for violin and piano, and more than fifty lieder. She wrote one opera, Vespero, with a libretto by Ernesto Ragazzoni.

== Life ==
Eugenia Calosso was born on 21 April 1878 in Turin, Piedmont. She studied at the conservatory in Leipzig, and studied composition with Giovanni Cravero. She began her career as a conductor at the Casino Municipale in San Remo and continued concert tours of Europe until 1914, conducting in Basle, Berlin, Brussels, Cologne, London and Paris.

Calosso wrote madrigals, lieder, orchestral suites, and instrumental works for violin and piano. She wrote about fifty lieder. She wrote one opera, Vespero with a libretto by Ernesto Ragazzoni.

She died after 1914.

In 2020 soprano Susan Nelson included one of Calosso's works, Foglie Secche, in a quarantine project to record one hundred pieces composed by women.
