= Rosa and Cornelia =

- Directed by: Giorgio Treves
- Cinematography: Camillo Bazzoni
- Music by: Franco Piersanti
- Release date: 25 August 2000
- Language: Italian

Rosa and Cornelia (Italian: Rosa e Cornelia) is a 2000 Italian drama film directed by Giorgio Treves. For her performance Stefania Rocca won a Globo d'oro.

== Cast ==
- Stefania Rocca: Rosa
- Chiara Muti: Cornelia
- Athina Cenci: Piera
- Massimo Poggio: Lorenzo
- Daria Nicolodi: Eleonora
