= Tea with Mussolini =

1999 film by Franco Zeffirelli

- U.S. theatrical release poster
- Directed by: Franco Zeffirelli
- Screenplay by: John Mortimer; Franco Zeffirelli
- Story by: Franco Zeffirelli (autobiography)
- Produced by: Clive Parsons; Riccardo Tozzi; Giovannella Zannoni; Frederick Muller; Marco Chimenz; Pippo Pisciotto
- Starring: Cher; Judi Dench; Joan Plowright; Maggie Smith; Lily Tomlin; Charlie Lucas; Baird Wallace; Massimo Ghini; Paolo Seganti; Michael Williams
- Cinematography: David Watkin
- Edited by: Tariq Anwar
- Music by: Stefano Arnaldi; Alessio Vlad
- Production companies: Cattleya; Cineritmo; Medusa Film; Film and General Productions
- Distributed by: Medusa Film (Italy); Universal Pictures (Select territories; through United International Pictures)
- Release dates: 26 March 1999 (Italy); 2 April 1999 (UK)
- Running time: 112 minutes
- Countries: United Kingdom; Italy
- Languages: English; Italian
- Budget: $12 million
- Box office: $45.5 million

Tea with Mussolini (Italian: Un tè con Mussolini) is a 1999 semi-autobiographical comedy-drama war film directed by Franco Zeffirelli, scripted by John Mortimer, telling the story of a young Italian boy's upbringing by a circle of British and American women before and during the Second World War.

At the 53rd British Academy Film Awards, Tea with Mussolini won the BAFTA Award for Best Actress in a Supporting Role (Maggie Smith). The film also nominated for BAFTA Award for Best Costume Design but lost to Sleepy Hollow.

== Plot ==
A group of cultured expatriate English women – the Scorpioni – meet for tea every afternoon in Florence, Italy in 1935. Luca is the young, out-of-wedlock son of an Italian businessman whose father has little interest in his upbringing. The boy's seamstress mother has recently died. His father's secretary, Mary Wallace, steps in to care for Luca, seeking support from her Scorpioni friends, including eccentric would-be artist Arabella. Luca learns about life and the arts. Elsa Morganthal, a rich young American widow whom Scorpioni matron Lady Hester Random barely tolerates, sets up a financial trust for Luca, as she was fond of his mother and still owes money for her dressmaking services.

When Italian Fascists attack the café during an afternoon tea, the uncertain position of the expatriate community is revealed. Lady Hester, widow of Britain's former ambassador to Italy, is an admirer of Benito Mussolini and she proudly recounts a "tea with Mussolini" at which she received personal assurances of their safety from him. Nonetheless, the Scorpioni find their position increasingly precarious. Luca's father decides Italy's future is with Germany rather than Britain and sends Luca to an Austrian boarding school.

Five years later, Luca plans to study art in Florence with Elsa's trust fund but finds that most British nationals are fleeing in anticipation of Mussolini's declaration of war on Great Britain. Mary has moved in with Lady Hester and the other English hold-outs. He follows the Scorpioni - including Hester's grandson Wilfred, disguised as a woman – to the Tuscan town of San Gimignano.

As the U.S. is not at war, Elsa and her American compatriot Georgie Rockwell, an openly lesbian archaeologist, remain free. Elsa uses Luca to deliver forged orders and funds to move the ladies from drab quarters to an upper class hotel. Believing Mussolini helped, Lady Hester brandishes the newspaper photo of her tea with Il Duce. Elsa, who is Jewish, has Luca deliver fake passports to Italian Jews as fascist persecution worsens. Luca, enamored of Elsa, becomes jealous to learn she's involved with Italian lawyer Vittorio.

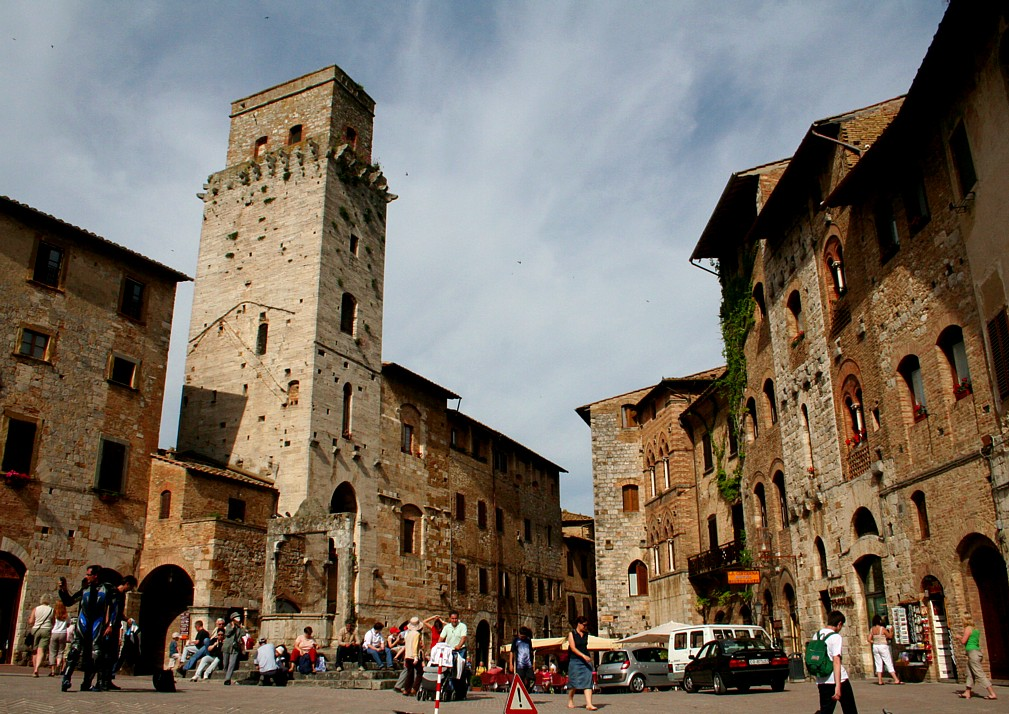
The Piazza Cisterna in San Gimignano, where many of the film's scenes were shot.

When the U.S. enters the war in 1941, Elsa and Georgie are interned with the British women. Vittorio is revealed as a con artist who embezzled Elsa's art collection and money, and plans to deliver her to the Gestapo in a phony escape to Switzerland. Luca knows and tells no one out of jealous spite, but has a change of heart and gives his trust fund money to the Italian resistance movement which Wilfred has joined. Elsa is unconvinced of Vittorio's betrayal. Lady Hester's praise of Mussolini earns her a rebuke from Mary which convinces her to assist Luca and Wilfrid in helping Elsa escape. Elsa reveals she supported Luca's mother with her pregnancy, so he could be there for her.

In July 1944, Arabella defends her frescoes from demolition by retreating German troops, joined by Georgie, Lady Hester and the English women. San Gimignano rejoices as the Scots Guards arrive to liberate the city. The British have orders to evacuate the Scorpioni but Lady Hester refuses, resolved to resume their former lives in Italy. Mary is delighted to see that Luca – now in British uniform – has become the "English gentleman" his father wished him to be.

Closing texts explain the mostly happy fates of the characters, concluding with the remark that Luca has become an artist and helped with the making of the film.

== Cast ==
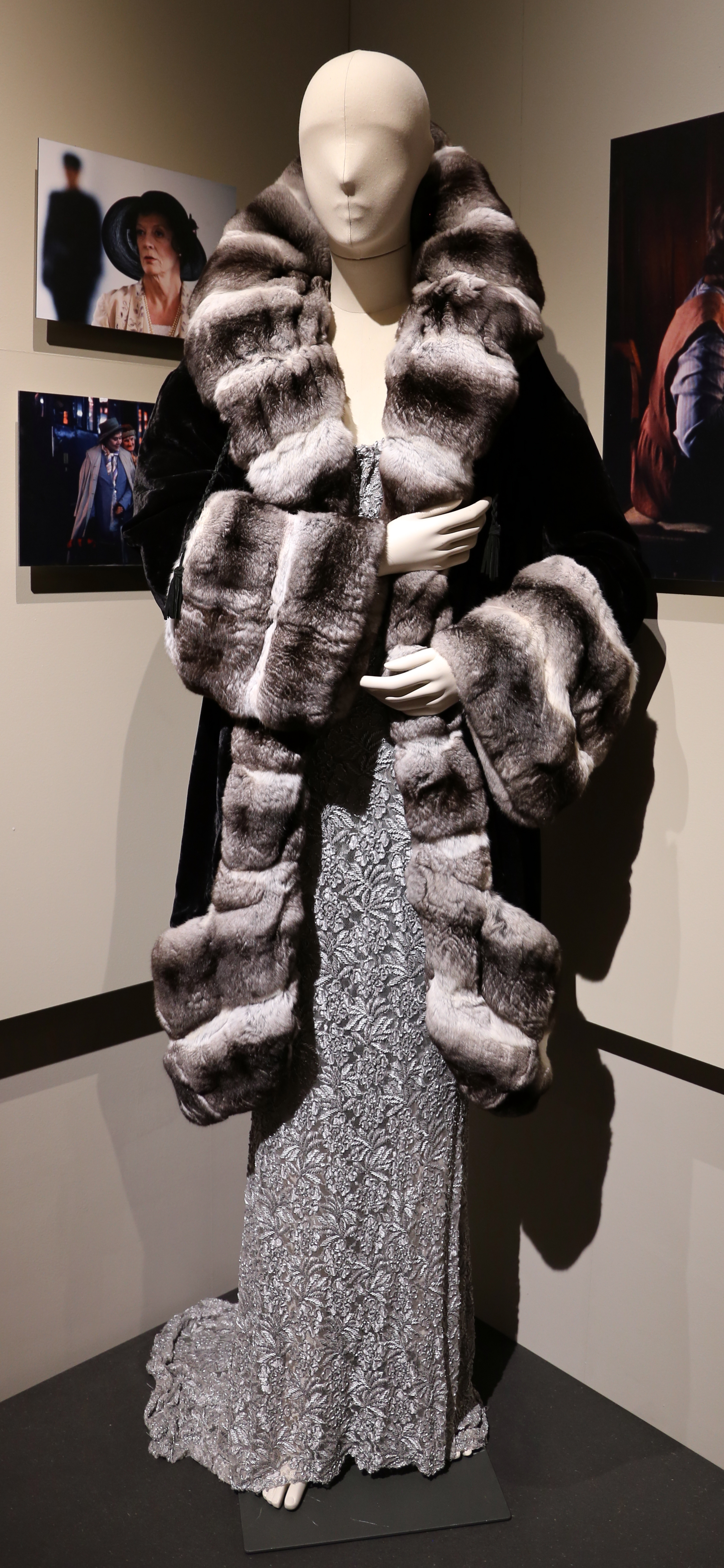
Costume for Cher, by Ermanno Scervino (Museo Zeffirelli, Florence)

- Joan Plowright as Mary Wallace, a British expatriate who becomes a surrogate mother for Luca
- Maggie Smith as Lady Hester Random, widow of the former British ambassador to Italy
- Cher as Elsa Morganthal Strauss-Armistan, a wealthy American socialite
- Judi Dench as Arabella, an aspiring artist and art lover
- Lily Tomlin as Georgina 'Georgie' Rockwell, an openly lesbian American archaeologist
- Tessa Pritchard as Connie Raynor, a journalist for The Morning Post
- Baird Wallace as Luca Innocenti, as a teenager
- Charlie Lucas as Luca Innocenti, as a child
- Paul Chequer as Wilfred 'Lucy' Random, Lady Hester's grandson
- Paolo Seganti as Vittorio Fanfanni, a lawyer and Elsa's lover
- Mino Bellei as Cesare, an art dealer and close friend of Elsa
- Massimo Ghini as Paolo Guarnieri Innocenti, Luca's father
- Michael Williams as the British Consul
- Claudio Spadaro as Benito Mussolini
- Pino Colizzi as Dino Grandi
- Paula Jacobs as Molly

Michael Williams, who was married to Judi Dench in real life, died not long after the film was finished. This film marks his last screen appearance.

== Production ==
Angela Lansbury was offered the role of Mary Wallace, but had to drop out when her husband became ill. Lady Hester Random is based upon a real resident of Florence whom Zeffirelli knew in his childhood. Zeffirelli mentions her and a couple of other ladies of the Scorpioni in his autobiography. He said: "I don't remember if she was called Hester, but I remember this terrible, fantastic woman. She was the dowager of the community. I remember the many outrageous things she did because she could afford to be arrogant and bossy."

== Reception ==
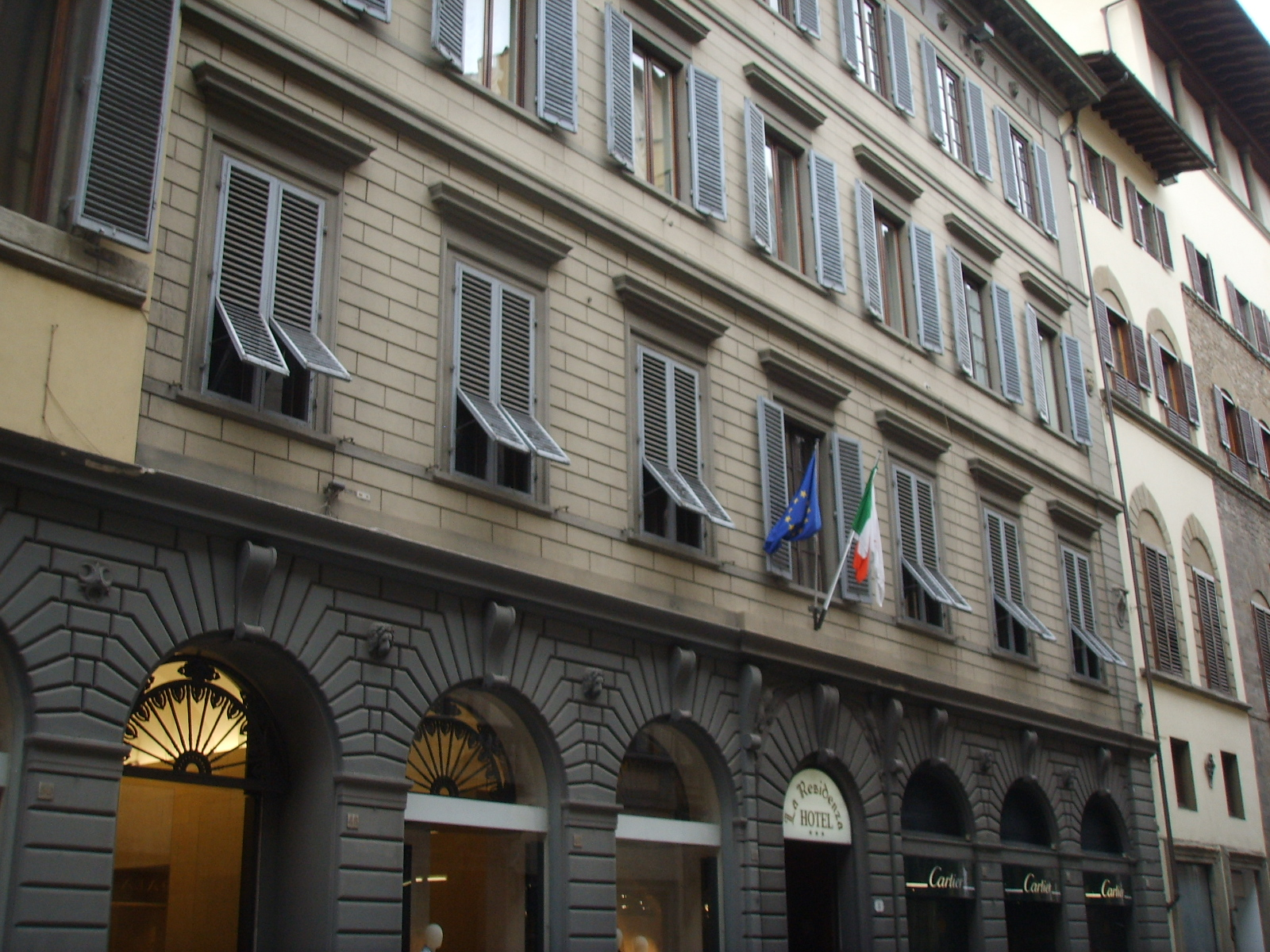
Exterior of the former Gran Caffè Doney in Florence, where the Scorpioni would meet

The film opened tenth at the U.S. box office with $1,633,183 for the weekend, eventually grossing a worldwide total of $45,566,200, considerably more than its budget. On Rotten Tomatoes, the film holds a rating of 64% from 39 reviews with the consensus: "Tea with Mussolini contains few surprises, but this amiably ambling drama is too likeable – and well-cast – to completely resist." Kevin Thomas of the Los Angeles Times wrote, "There are some scary, somber moments in this lushest of period pieces, yet Zeffirelli wisely sustains a gallant, predominantly blithe spirit throughout. Tea with Mussolini leaves you feeling that, if in reality not everything that Zeffirelli recalls had quite so much dash, whimsy and gallantry, it's the way it should have been."

== Awards and nominations ==
Won

- 2000 – BAFTA Awards – Best Performance by an Actress in a Supporting Role; Maggie Smith.
- 2000 – Hollywood Makeup Artist and Hair Stylist Guild Awards – Best Period Hair Styling Feature; Vivian McAteer.
- 2000 – Italian National Syndicate of Film Journalists – Best Costume Design (Migliori Costumi); Anna Anni, Alberto Spiazzi.

Nominations

- 1999 – Golden Trailer Awards – Best Drama.
- 2000 – BAFTA Awards – Best Costume Design; Jenny Beavan, Anna Anni, Alberto Spiazzi.

== See also ==
- Gran Caffè Doney
