= Cavalleria rusticana (1982 film) =

1982 film

- VHS cover with Plácido Domingo
- Based on: Cavalleria rusticana by Pietro Mascagni
- Written by: Guido Menasci; Giovanni Verga
- Directed by: Franco Zeffirelli
- Starring: Plácido Domingo; Elena Obraztsova
- Music by: Pietro Mascagni
- Country of origin: Italy
- Original language: Italian

Production
- Cinematography: Armando Nannuzzi
- Editor: Giorgio De Vincenzo
- Running time: 70 minutes

Original release
- Release: 1982

Cavalleria rusticana is a 1982 Italian film directed by Franco Zeffirelli based on Pietro Mascagni's 1890 opera of the same name. It stars tenor Plácido Domingo, mezzo-soprano Elena Obraztsova, and baritone Renato Bruson, all singing their own roles. Georges Prêtre conducted the Teatro alla Scala Orchestra and Choir for the movie's soundtrack. The film was made for broadcast on television. In 2003, it was released on DVD by Deutsche Grammophon, paired with Pagliacci (having earlier been released by Philips/Decca on DVD), also starring Plácido Domingo and directed by Franco Zeffirelli.

== Production ==
Initially, the Italian television network RAI expressed interest in recording the live opening night double-bill of Franco Zeffirelli's stage productions of Cavalleria rusticana and Pagliacci at the Teatro alla Scala. However, the director wanted to film the operas like movies instead of live stage productions. Over the course of two days, he filmed both operas on the stage of La Scala without an audience and in segments of ten minutes or less. He later added pick-up shots at a film studio in Milan. He also filmed some on location in Vizzini, Sicily, for greater authenticity.

== Reception ==
Originally shown on Italian television, it was later replayed on U.S. television to enthusiastic reactions.
