= Piero Tosi =

Italian costume designer (1927–2019)

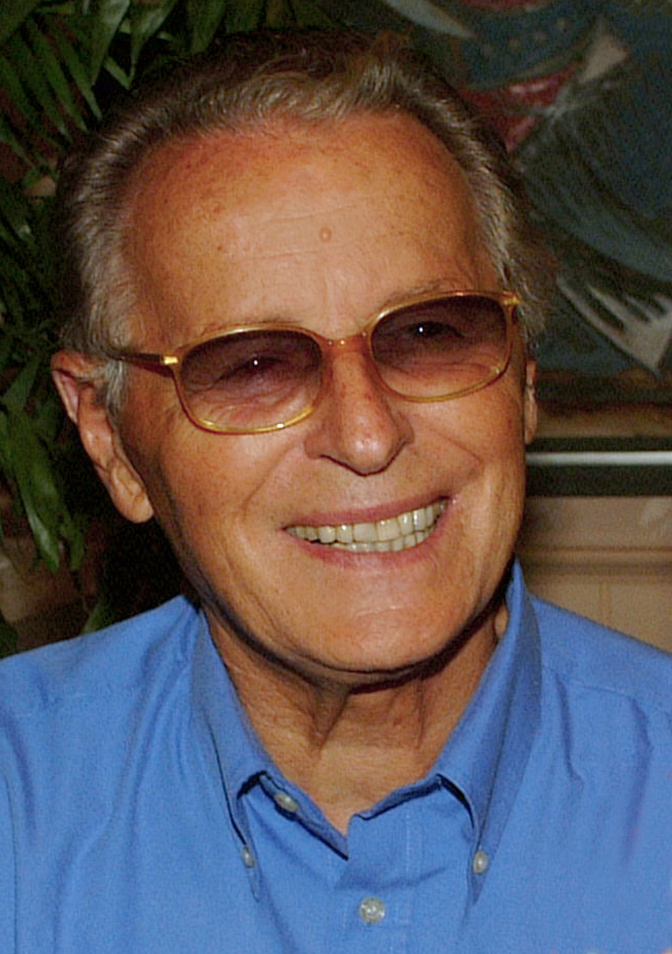
- Tosi in 2001
- Born: 10 April 1927; Sesto Fiorentino, Kingdom of Italy
- Died: 10 August 2019 (aged 92); Rome, Italy
- Occupation: Costume designer

Piero Tosi (10 April 1927 – 10 August 2019) was an Italian costume designer. He has received numerous accolades, including two BAFTA Awards and two David di Donatellos, in addition to nominations for five Academy Awards. In 2013, he became the first costume designer to receive an Academy Honorary Award as "a visionary whose incomparable costume designs shaped timeless, living art in motion pictures."

== Biography ==
Tosi's film credits include Bellissima, Senso, The Leopard, Yesterday, Today and Tomorrow, Death in Venice, The Night Porter, and La Traviata.

He was particularly known for his exhaustively researched and intricately detailed historical costumes.

He won the David di Donatello for Best Costumes twice, as well as the 50th Anniversary David in 2006. He also won the BAFTA Award for Best Costume Design twice, and was nominated for the Academy Award for Best Costume Design five times.

He died in Rome on 10 August 2019, at the age of 92.

== Filmography ==
=== Film ===
Year	Title	Director	Notes
1951	Bellissima	Luchino Visconti	
1953	Aida	Clemente Fracassi	Assistant costume designer
1953	Musoduro	Giuseppe Bennati	
1954	Senso	Luchino Visconti	
1955	Il padrone sono me	Franco Brusati	
1956	The Awakening	Mario Camerini	Also set decorator
1957	White Nights	Luchino Visconti	
1957	Vacanze a Ischia	Mario Camerini	
1958	Young Husbands	Mauro Bolognini	
1959	Policarpo	Mario Soldati	
1959	You're on Your Own	Mauro Bolognini	
1960	Il bell'Antonio	Mauro Bolognini	Also set decorator
1960	Rocco and His Brothers	Luchino Visconti	
1960	Love in Rome	Dino Risi	
1961	The Lovemakers	Mauro Bolognini	Also production designer
1961	On the Tiger's Back	Luigi Comencini	
1962	Boccaccio '70	Luchino Visconti	Segment: "Il Lavoro"
1962	Careless	Mauro Bolognini	Also set decorator
1963	The Leopard	Luchino Visconti	
1963	The Organizer	Mario Monicelli	
1963	Yesterday, Today and Tomorrow	Vittorio De Sica	
1963	La visita	Antonio Pietrangeli	
1964	The Ape Woman	Marco Ferreri	
1964	Marriage Italian Style	Vittorio De Sica	Tosi only designed costumes for Sophia Loren and Marcello Mastroianni
1966	After the Fox	Vittorio De Sica	
1967	The Witches	Mauro Bolognini; Vittorio De Sica; Pier Paolo Pasolini; Franco Rossi; Luchino Visconti	
1967	Matchless	Renato Castellani	
1967	The Stranger	Luchino Visconti	
1967	Arabella	Mauro Bolognini	
1967	Ghosts – Italian Style	Renato Castellani	with Enrico Sabbatini; Tosi only designed costumes for Sophia Loren
1968	Spirits of the Dead	Federico Fellini	Segment: "Toby Dammit"; Also supervising production designer
1969	The Damned	Luchino Visconti	
1969	Medea	Pier Paolo Pasolini	
1970	Metello	Mauro Bolognini	Costume supervisor
1970	So Long Gulliver	Carlo Tuzii	
1971	Bubù	Mauro Bolognini	
1971	Death in Venice	Luchino Visconti	
1973	Ludwig	Luchino Visconti	
1973	We Want the Colonels	Mario Monicelli	
1974	The Night Porter	Liliana Cavani	
1974	Conversation Piece	Luchino Visconti	Tosi only designed costumes for Silvana Mangano
1975	Libera, My Love	Mauro Bolognini	Also set decorator
1975	The Peaceful Age	Fabio Carpi	
1975	Down the Ancient Staircase	Mauro Bolognini	Also production designer
1976	The Innocent	Luchino Visconti	
1977	Beyond Good and Evil	Liliana Cavani	
1978	La Cage aux Folles	Édouard Molinaro	Tosi only designed costumes for Ugo Tognazzi and Michel Serrault
1978	Where Are You Going on Holiday?	Mauro Bolognini	Segment: "Sarò tutta per te"
1979	Hypochondriac	Tonino Cervi	
1981	The Lady of the Camellias	Mauro Bolognini	
1981	The Skin	Liliana Cavani	
1982	Più bello di così si muore	Pasquale Festa Campanile	Tosi only designed female disguise costumes for Enrico Montesano
1982	Beyond the Door	Liliana Cavani	
1983	La Traviata	Franco Zeffirelli	
1985	La Cage aux Folles 3: The Wedding	Georges Lautner	with Ambra Danon
1993	Sparrow	Franco Zeffirelli	
2004	The Keys to the House	Gianni Amelio	

=== Television ===
Year	Title	Notes
1990	Vendetta: Secrets of a Mafia Bride	3 episodes
1993	Albert Savarus	Television film

== Awards and nominations ==
Major associations

Academy Awards

Year	Category	Nominated work	Result	Ref.
1964	Best Costume Design – Color	The Leopard	Nominated	
1972	Best Costume Design	Death in Venice	Nominated	
1974	Best Costume Design	Ludwig	Nominated	
1980	Best Costume Design	La Cage aux Folles	Nominated	
1983	Best Costume Design	La Traviata	Nominated	
2014	Academy Honorary Award	—N/a	Honored	

BAFTA Awards

Year	Category	Nominated work	Result	Ref.
British Academy Film Awards
1972	Best Costume Design	Death in Venice	Won	
1984	Best Costume Design	La Traviata	Won	

Miscellaneous awards

List of Piero Tosi other awards and nominations
Award	Year (Note: Indicates the year of ceremony. Each year is linked to the article about the awards held that year, wherever possible.)	Category	Title	Result
Costume Designers Guild Awards	2003	President's Award	—N/a	Honored
David di Donatello Awards	1981	Best Costumes	The Lady of the Camellias	Won
David di Donatello Awards	1994	Best Costumes	Sparrow	Won
David di Donatello Awards	2006	50th Anniversary David	—N/a	Honored
Globo d'oro Awards	2000	Lifetime Achievement Award	—N/a	Honored
Nastro d'Argento Awards	1960	Best Costume Design	Policarpo	Won
Nastro d'Argento Awards	1961	Best Costume Design	Rocco and His Brothers	Nominated
Nastro d'Argento Awards	1962	Best Costume Design	The Lovemakers	Won
Nastro d'Argento Awards	1963	Best Costume Design	Careless	Won
Nastro d'Argento Awards	1964	Best Costume Design	The Leopard	Won
Nastro d'Argento Awards	1964	Best Costume Design	The Organizer	Nominated
Nastro d'Argento Awards	1969	Best Costume Design	Spirits of the Dead	Nominated
Nastro d'Argento Awards	1970	Best Costume Design	The Damned	Nominated
Nastro d'Argento Awards	1971	Best Costume Design	Metello	Nominated
Nastro d'Argento Awards	1972	Best Costume Design	Death in Venice	Won
Nastro d'Argento Awards	1974	Best Costume Design	Ludwig	Won
Nastro d'Argento Awards	1976	Best Costume Design	Down the Ancient Staircase	Nominated
Nastro d'Argento Awards	1981	Best Costume Design	The Lady of the Camellias	Won
Nastro d'Argento Awards	1983	Best Costume Design	La Traviata	Won
Nastro d'Argento Awards	1995	Best Costume Design	Sparrow	Won
Nastro d'Argento Awards	2014	Lifetime Achievement Award	—N/a	Honored
