= Splendor (1989 film) =

- Italian DVD cover
- Directed by: Ettore Scola
- Written by: Ettore Scola
- Starring: Marcello Mastroianni; Marina Vlady; Massimo Troisi
- Cinematography: Luciano Tovoli
- Edited by: Francesco Malvestito
- Music by: Armando Trovajoli
- Production companies: Cecchi Gori Group; Studio E.L. Gaumont
- Distributed by: Warner Bros. Italia (Italy); Gaumont Distribution (France)
- Release dates: 9 March 1989 (Italy); 17 May 1989 (France)
- Running time: 110 minutes
- Countries: Italy; France
- Language: Italian

Splendor is a 1989 Italian-French drama film directed by Ettore Scola.

== Plot ==
Jordan (Marcello Mastroianni) runs a struggling cinema called Splendor in a small town in Italy. Low ticket sales mean that the cinema is no longer a viable business, and Jordan reflects on his experiences running Splendor, from his arrival in the town as a child with his father. He meets French showgirl Chantal (Marina Vlady) at one of her performances, and she comes to work for him as an usher. Cinephile Luigi (Massimo Troisi) repeatedly attends screenings of Il Sorpasso in order to see Chantal, with whom he is besotted, and after a brief fling he begins working for Jordan as the projectionist. Attendance at the cinema decreases with the rise of television and Jordan considers bringing in strippers to try to solve his financial problems. Throughout are seen clips of the films shown at the cinema: Metropolis, It's a Wonderful Life, La Grande Guerra, Amarcord, amongst others.

== Cast ==
- Marcello Mastroianni as Jordan
- Massimo Troisi as Luigi
- Marina Vlady as Chantal Duvivier
- Paolo Panelli as Mr. Paolo
- Pamela Villoresi as Eugenia
- Giacomo Piperno as Lo Fazio

== Awards ==
- 1989 Cannes Film Festival Official Selection
- Nastro d'Argento Best Cinematography (Luciano Tovoli)
