= Pagliacci (1982 film) =

1982 film

- Plácido Domingo as Canio
- Written by: Ruggiero Leoncavallo
- Directed by: Franco Zeffirelli
- Starring: Plácido Domingo
- Country of origin: Italy
- Original language: Italian

Production
- Cinematography: Armando Nannuzzi
- Editor: Giorgio De Vincenzo
- Running time: 72 minutes

Original release
- Release: 1982

Pagliacci is a 1982 Italian film of Ruggero Leoncavallo's opera Pagliacci, directed by Franco Zeffirelli. All the actors, including Plácido Domingo and Teresa Stratas in the starring roles, were opera singers who sang their own parts. Pagliacci was shot at Milan's La Scala opera house and on a movie sound stage. Georges Prêtre conducted the Orchestra and Choir of La Scala.

The film was screened out of competition at the 1987 Cannes Film Festival. It was also shown on Italian and U.S. television and brought Zeffirelli an Emmy Award for Best Director in the category of Classical Music Programming. In 2003, Pagliacci was re-released on DVD by Deutsche Grammophon (having earlier been released by Philips/Decca on DVD), paired with Cavalleria rusticana (also starring Plácido Domingo).

== Plot ==
The story is set in southern Italy and recounts the tragedy of Canio, the lead clown (or pagliaccio in Italian) in a commedia dell'arte troupe, his wife Nedda, and her lover, Silvio. When Nedda spurns the advances of Tonio, another player in the troupe, he tells Canio about Nedda's betrayal. In a jealous rage Canio murders both Nedda and Silvio during a performance. Although Leoncavallo's opera was originally set in the late 1860s, Zeffirelli's production is updated to the interwar period.

== Cast ==
- Teresa Stratas as Nedda
- Plácido Domingo as Canio
- Juan Pons as Tonio
- Alberto Rinaldi as Silvio
- Florindo Andreolli as Beppe
- Alfredo Pistone as First Peasant
- Ivan Del Manto as Second Peasant

== Production ==
The Italian television network RAI had originally wanted to broadcast a live performance of Franco Zeffirelli's 1981 productions of Cavalleria rusticana and Pagliacci from the stage of La Scala. Zeffirelli, however, requested to be allowed to film the productions as if they were movies instead. In part, because both operas starred popular tenor Plácido Domingo, Unitel agreed to help finance the project. Zeffirelli insisted that Canadian soprano Teresa Stratas play Nedda, even though she was not originally cast in the stage production. Over the course of only two days, the director filmed both works at the opera house when it was not in use. He had a wooden platform built over the front seats of the auditorium, where he placed his cameras to film the action onstage. He later did pick-up shots at an Italian film studio.

== Soundtrack ==
For the movie's soundtrack, Georges Prêtre conducted the orchestra of the Teatro alla Scala in the opera house's orchestra pit, while each of the film's performers sang their own parts onstage while the cameras rolled. No audience, however, was present and it was recorded in segments. Plácido Domingo, who had frequently performed the role of Canio onstage since 1966, previously recorded the opera in 1971 under Nello Santi. Philips Records released the film's soundtrack on LP in 1985 and CD in 1990. It received a Grammy Award nomination for Best Opera Recording.

In a review of the soundtrack, the Montreal Gazette wrote: "Sound effects are included, which lend to the singing a credibility that you do not always feel on recordings." The article also praised Domingo and Statas' singing and noted that the original analog recordings of the movie were digitally remastered prior to the soundtrack's release. Although they were filmed together, the Pagliacci recording was originally released separately from the soundtrack for Cavalleria rusticana.
