= Sparrow (1993 film) =

1993 film by Franco Zeffirelli

- Directed by: Franco Zeffirelli
- Written by: Giovanni Verga (novel); Franco Zeffirelli; Allan Baker
- Produced by: Mario Cecchi Gori; Vittorio Cecchi Gori; Luciano Luna; Rita Rusic
- Starring: Angela Bettis; Johnathon Schaech; Vanessa Redgrave; Valentina Cortese; Frank Finlay
- Cinematography: Ennio Guarnieri
- Edited by: Richard Marden
- Music by: Claudio Capponi; Alessio Vlad
- Release date: 1993
- Running time: 106 minutes
- Country: Italy
- Languages: Italian; English

Sparrow (Italian: Storia di una capinera) is a 1993 Italian drama film directed by Franco Zeffirelli. It is an adaptation of Giovanni Verga's novel Storia di una capinera and was filmed in Sicily in 1993. It stars Angela Bettis, and premiered at the Tokyo International Film Festival in October 1993. It was the final film performance of Valentina Cortese.

== Plot ==
In the Two Sicilies, in cholera-ridden Sicily of 1854, Maria, a future nun, is evacuated from her convent home in Catania to her father's Mount Etna-shadowed villa. During her stay she falls in love with Nino, a family friend.

Things fall apart when Catania is declared safe for her to return to Sicily, meaning she dmust renounce her love and concentrate on serving God.

== Cast ==
- Angela Bettis as Maria Vizzini
- Johnathon Schaech as Nino Valentini
- Vanessa Redgrave as Sister Agata
- Valentina Cortese as Mother Superior
- Frank Finlay as Father Nunzio
- Sinéad Cusack as Matilde Vizzini
- Denis Quilley as Baron Cesaro
- Pat Heywood as Sister Teresa
- Eva Alexander as Annetta
- John Castle as Giuseppe Vizzini
- Gareth Thomas as Corrado
- Andrea Cassar as Gigi

== Awards and nominations ==
The film was awarded and nominated for awards in Italy and Portugal.

David di Donatello Awards

- David Award for Best Costume Design (Migliore Costumista) - Piero Tosi (won)

Italian National Syndicate of Film Journalists (Nastro d'Argento)

- Silver Ribbon for Best Costume Design - Piero Tosi (won)

Gramado Film Festival

- Golden Kikito Award for Best Latin Film (Melhor Filme) - Franco Zeffirelli (nomination)
