= Maurizio Millenotti =

Italian costume designer

Maurizio Millenotti (born 12 June 1946) is an Italian costume designer. He was nominated for two Academy Awards in the category Best Costume Design for the films Otello and Hamlet.
