= Luciano Calosso =

Italian costume designer (born 1953)

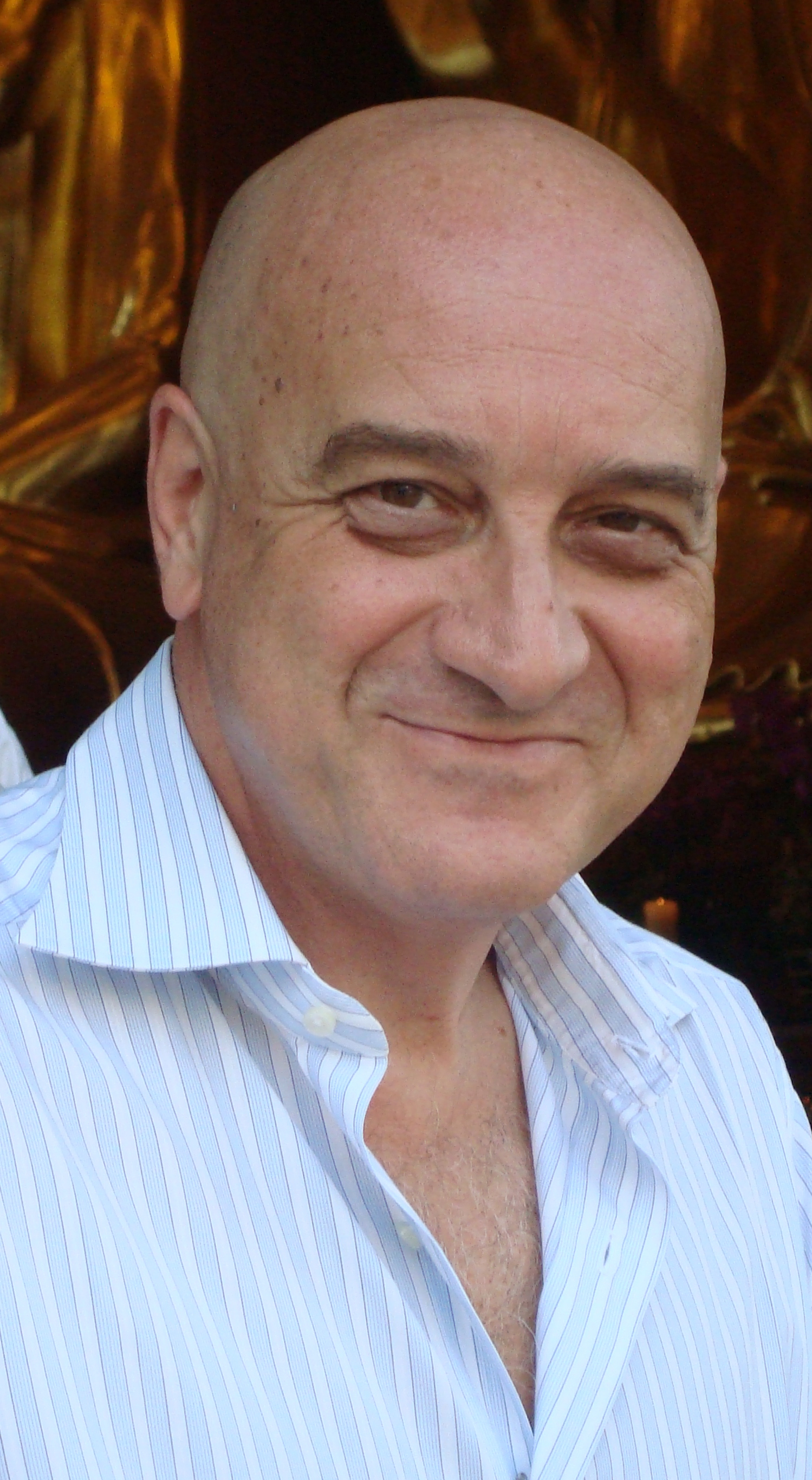
- Born: 23 October 1953; Rome, Italy
- Occupation: Costume designer

Luciano Calosso (Rome, 23 October 1953) is an Italian costume designer. In 1981, he received the Best Costume Designer Award at David di Donatello for Fontamara.

== Filmography ==
- Il giustiziere di mezzogiorno (1975)
- Noi non siamo angeli (1977)
- Fontamara (1980)
- Aiutami a sognare (1981)
- Honey (1981)
- La neve nel bicchiere (1986)
- I protagonisti di Fellini (1984)
- The Jeweller's Shop (1989)
- Il lungo viaggio (1987)
- Un poliziotto in città (1988)
- Il prato delle volpi (1989)
- The Wicked (1991)
- Sindrome veneziana (1991)
- Favola crudele (1991)
- Frate Julianus (TV series) (1991)
- Berlino '39 (1993)
- Stato d'emergenza (1992)
- Delitto passionale (1994)
- Caccia alle mosche (1993)
- Una sola debole voce (1999)
- Sos laribiancos - I dimenticati (2001)
