= Franco Zeffirelli =

Italian filmmaker (1923–2019)

Franco Zeffirelli OMRI
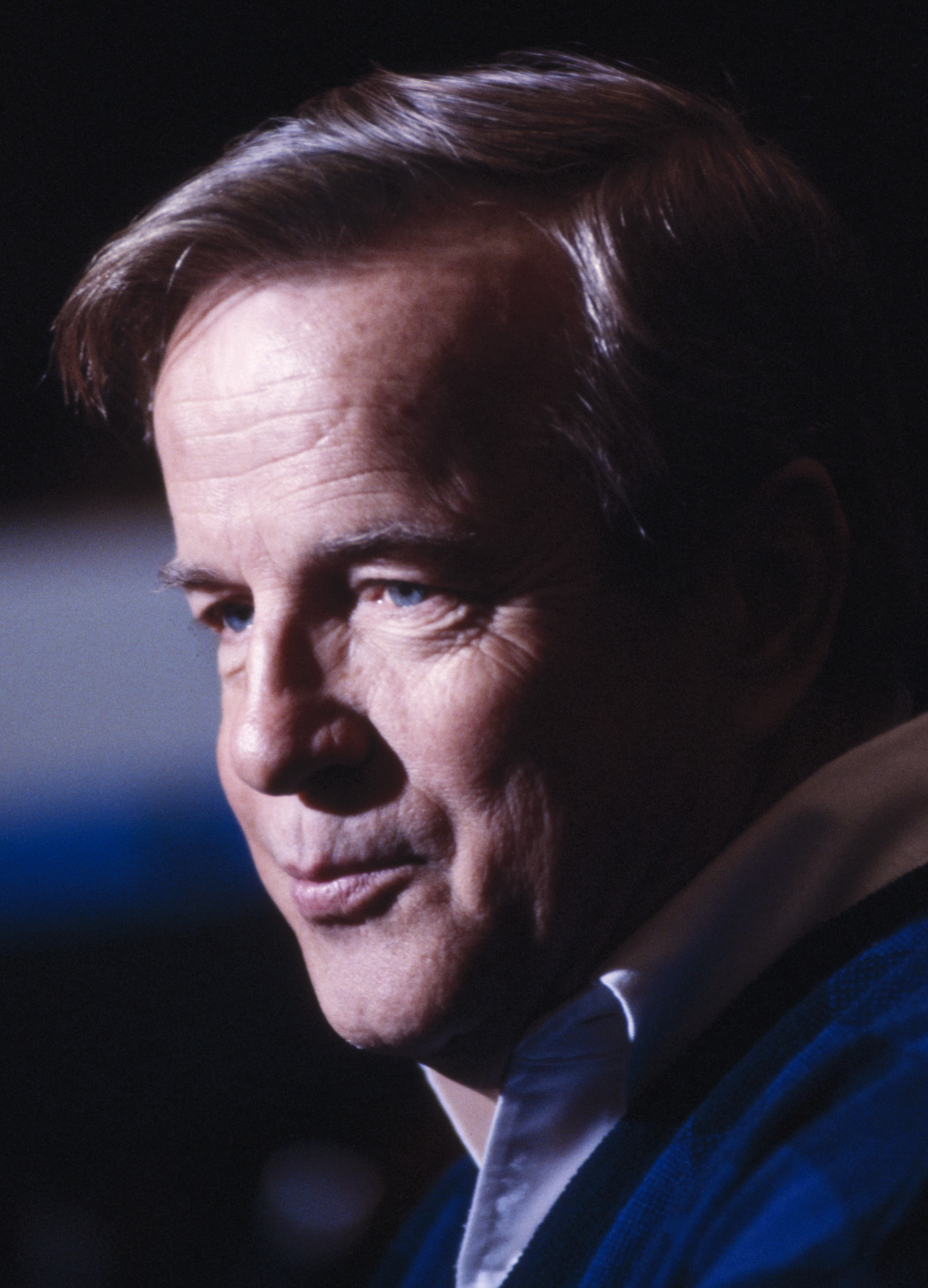
- Zeffirelli in 1972

Member of the Senate of the Republic
- In office 21 April 1994 – 29 May 2001
- Constituency: Catania

Personal details
- Born: Gian Franco Corsi Zeffirelli; 12 February 1923 Florence, Italy
- Died: 15 June 2019 (aged 96) Rome, Italy
- Party: Christian Democracy (before 1994); Forza Italia (1994–2001)
- Children: 2 (adopted)
- Education: Academy of Fine Arts of Florence
- Occupation: Film director; opera director; politician
- Military career
- Allegiance: United Kingdom
- Branch: British Army
- Service years: 1942–1945
- Units: 24th Guards Brigade
- Conflicts: World War II

Gian Franco Corsi Zeffirelli (Italian pronunciation: [ˈfraŋko ddzeffiˈrɛlli]; 12 February 1923 – 15 June 2019) was an Italian stage and film director, producer, production designer and politician. He was one of the most significant opera and theatre directors of the post–World War II era, gaining both acclaim and notoriety for his lavish stagings of classical works, as well as his film adaptations of the same.

Films he directed included the Shakespearean adaptations The Taming of the Shrew (1967), starring Elizabeth Taylor and Richard Burton; Romeo and Juliet (1968), for which he received a nomination for the Academy Award for Best Director; and Hamlet (1990), starring Mel Gibson and Glenn Close. His Biblical television miniseries Jesus of Nazareth (1977) won both national and international acclaim and is still frequently shown at Christmas and Easter in many countries.

A member of the Forza Italia party, he served as the Senator for Catania between 1994 and 2001.

A Grand Officer of the Order of Merit of the Italian Republic since 1977, Zeffirelli also received an honorary British knighthood in 2004. Zeffirelli was awarded the Premio Colosseo in 2009 by the city of Rome.

== Early life ==
Zeffirelli was born Gian Franco Corsi Zeffirelli in the outskirts of Florence, Tuscany, Italy, after an affair between Florentine Alaide Garosi, a fashion designer, and Ottorino Corsi, a wool and silk dealer from Vinci. Since both were married, Alaide was unable to use her surname or Corsi's for her child. She came up with "Zeffiretti", which are the "little breezes" mentioned in Mozart's opera Idomeneo, of which she was quite fond. However, it was misspelt in the register and became Zeffirelli. When he was six years old, his mother died and he subsequently grew up under the auspices of the English expatriate community and was particularly involved with the so-called Scorpioni, who inspired his semi-autobiographical film Tea with Mussolini (1999).

Italian researchers found that Zeffirelli was one of a handful of living people traceably consanguineous with Leonardo da Vinci. He was a descendant of one of da Vinci's siblings.

Zeffirelli graduated from the Accademia di Belle Arti Firenze in 1941 and, following his father's advice, entered the University of Florence to study art and architecture. After World War II broke out, he fought as a partisan with the Italian Resistance, before he met up with British soldiers of the 1st Battalion Scots Guards and became their interpreter. After the war, he re-entered the University of Florence to continue his studies, but when he saw Laurence Olivier's Henry V in 1945, he directed his attention toward theatre instead.

While working for a scene painter in Florence, he was introduced to Luchino Visconti, who hired him as an assistant director for the film La Terra trema, which was released in 1948. Visconti's methods had a deep impact on Zeffirelli's later work. He also worked with directors such as Vittorio De Sica and Roberto Rossellini. In the 1960s, he made his name designing and directing his own plays in London and New York City and soon transferred his ideas to the cinema.

== Career ==
=== Film ===
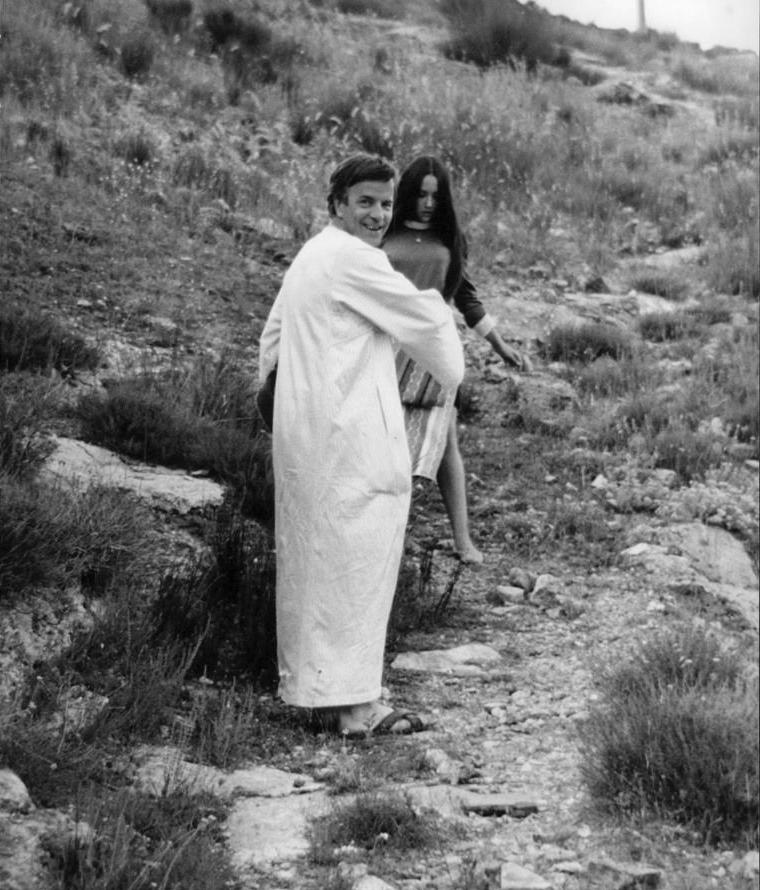
Zeffirelli with Olivia Hussey while filming Romeo and Juliet in 1967

Zeffirelli's first film as director was a version of The Taming of the Shrew (1967), originally intended for Sophia Loren and Marcello Mastroianni but featuring the Hollywood stars Elizabeth Taylor and Richard Burton in their stead. Taylor and Burton helped fund production and took a percentage of the profits rather than their normal salaries.

While he was editing The Taming of the Shrew, Zeffirelli's native Florence was devastated by floods. A month later, he released a short documentary, entitled Florence: Days of Destruction, to raise funds for the disaster appeal.

Zeffirelli's major breakthrough came the year after, when he presented two teenagers as Romeo and Juliet (1968). It made Zeffirelli a household name – no other subsequent work by him had the immediate impact of Romeo and Juliet. The film earned $14.5 million in domestic rentals at the North American box office in 1969. It was re-released in 1973 and earned $1.7 million in rentals.

Film critic Roger Ebert, for the Chicago Sun-Times, wrote: "I believe Franco Zeffirelli's Romeo and Juliet is the most exciting film of Shakespeare ever made".

After two successful film adaptations of Shakespeare, Zeffirelli went on to religious themes, first with a film about the life of St. Francis of Assisi titled Brother Sun, Sister Moon (1972), then his extended mini-series Jesus of Nazareth (1977) with an all-star cast. The latter was a major success in the ratings.

He moved on to contemporary themes with a remake of the boxing picture The Champ (1979) and the critically panned Endless Love (1981). In the 1980s, he made a series of successful films adapting opera to the screen, with such stars as Plácido Domingo, Teresa Stratas, Juan Pons and Katia Ricciarelli. He returned to Shakespeare with Hamlet (1990), casting Mel Gibson in the lead role. His adaptation of the Charlotte Brontë novel Jane Eyre (1996) was a critical success.

Zeffirelli frequently cast unknown actors in major roles: Leonard Whiting (Romeo in Romeo and Juliet), Graham Faulkner (St. Francis in Brother Sun, Sister Moon) and Martin Hewitt (David Axelrod in Endless Love).

=== Opera ===
Zeffirelli was a major director of opera productions from the 1950s in Italy and elsewhere in Europe as well as the United States. He began his career in the theatre as assistant to Luchino Visconti. Then he tried his hand at scenography. His first work as a director was buffo operas by Gioachino Rossini. He became a friend of Maria Callas and they worked together on a La traviata in Dallas, Texas, in 1958. Of particular note is his 1964 Royal Opera House production of Tosca with Maria Callas and Tito Gobbi. In the same year, he created Callas' last Norma at the Paris Opera. He also staged at the Vienna State Opera: Don Giovanni (1972), La Bohème (1963), and Carmen with Elena Obraztsova and Plácido Domingo in 1978. Zeffirelli also collaborated with Joan Sutherland, designing and directing her performances of Gaetano Donizetti's Lucia di Lammermoor in 1959. Over the years he created several productions for the Metropolitan Opera in New York, including La bohème, Tosca, Turandot and Don Giovanni. When the new Metropolitan Opera opened at Lincoln Center, he directed its first production, Samuel Barber's Antony and Cleopatra, starring Leontyne Price.

== Criticism ==
Zeffirelli received criticism from religious groups for what they call the blasphemous representation of biblical figures in his films. He also roused accusations of antisemitism for describing Martin Scorsese's The Last Temptation of Christ as a product of "that Jewish cultural scum of Los Angeles which is always spoiling for a chance to attack the Christian world."

Zeffirelli was a highly conservative Catholic, and served two terms in the Italian senate as a member of Silvio Berlusconi's centre-right Forza Italia party. He was criticized by members of the gay community for upholding the Catholic Church's position on homosexuality and by others for support of the Church's position on abortion. At one point he even called for capital punishment for women who had terminated a pregnancy.

He roused controversy again when he told a newspaper in 2006 that he had not suffered any harm when sexually abused by a priest as a child.

== Personal life ==
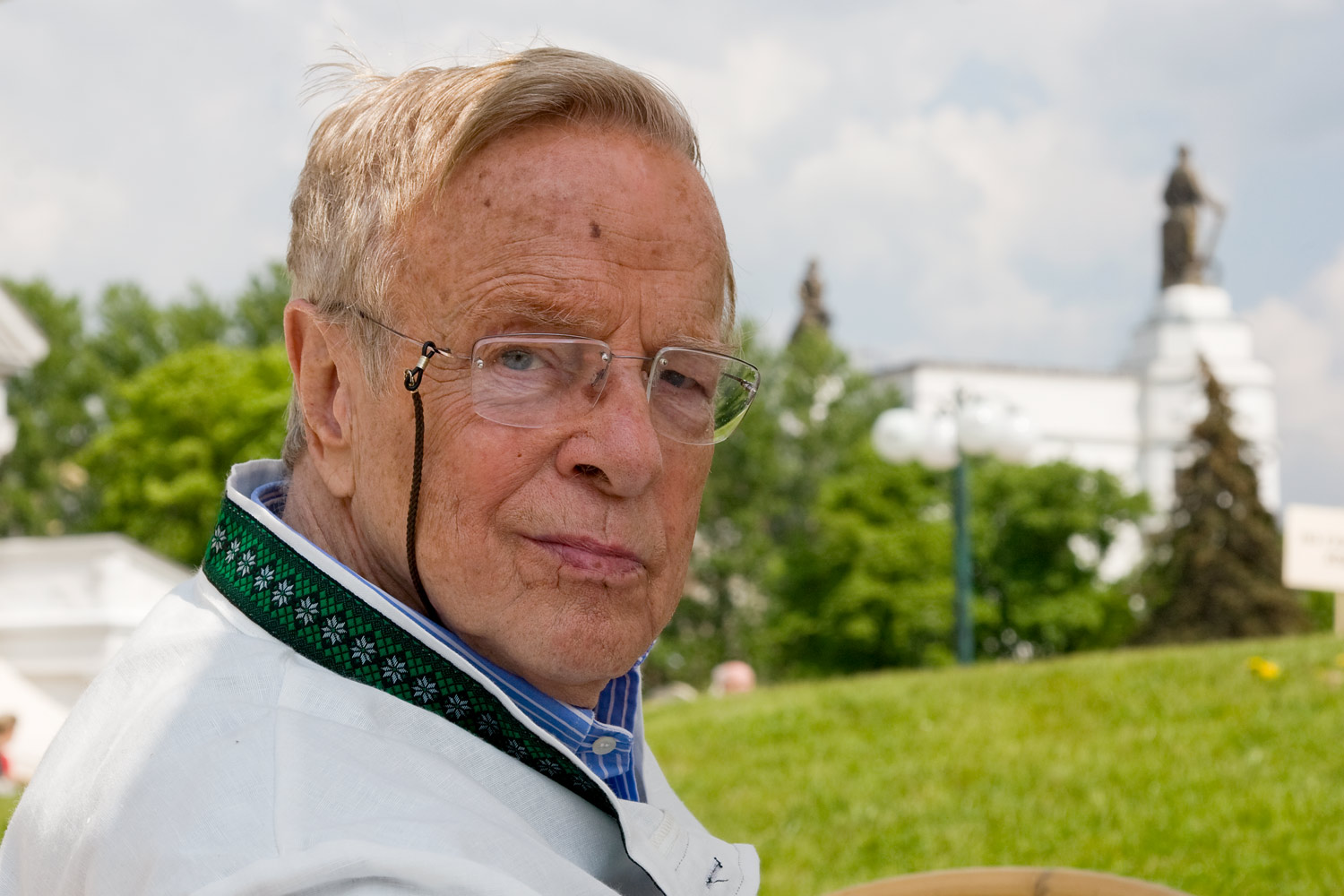
Zeffirelli in 2008

In 1996, Zeffirelli came out as gay, but thereafter preferred to be discreet about his personal life. Zeffirelli said that he considered himself "homosexual" rather than gay, as he felt the term "gay" was less elegant. Zeffirelli adopted two adult sons, men with whom he had lived and who worked for him for years, managing his affairs.

=== Allegations of sexual assault ===
Writer and film director Bruce Robinson claimed to have been the target of unwanted amorous attention from Zeffirelli during the filming of Romeo and Juliet, in which Robinson played Benvolio. Robinson says that he based the lecherous character of Uncle Monty in the film Withnail and I on Zeffirelli.

In 2018, the American actor Johnathon Schaech alleged that Zeffirelli sexually assaulted him during the filming of Sparrow (Storia di una capinera, 1993). Zeffirelli's son Giuseppe "Pippo", adopted by the filmmaker as an adult, issued a statement at the time denying the allegation.

=== Death ===
Zeffirelli died at his home in Rome, on 15 June 2019, aged 96.

== Honours ==
In 1996, he was awarded an honorary degree for services to the arts by the University of Kent at a graduation ceremony held in Canterbury Cathedral. In 1999, he received the Crystal Globe award for outstanding artistic contribution to world cinema at the Karlovy Vary International Film Festival. In November 2004, he was awarded an honorary knighthood by the United Kingdom.

=== Awards and nominations ===
Association	Year	Category	Work	Result	Ref(s)
Academy Awards	1969	Best Director	Romeo and Juliet	Nominated	
Academy Awards	1983	Best Art Direction	La Traviata	Nominated	
British Academy Film Awards	1969	Best Direction	Romeo and Juliet	Nominated	
British Academy Film Awards	1984	Best Film Not in the English Language	La Traviata	Nominated	
British Academy Film Awards	1984	Best Production Design	La Traviata	Won	
British Academy Film Awards	1987	Best Film Not in the English Language	Otello	Nominated	
British Academy Television Awards	1978	Best Single Play	Jesus of Nazareth	Nominated	
Cannes Film Festival	1986	Palme d'Or	Otello	Nominated	
David di Donatello Awards	1969	Best Director	Romeo and Juliet	Won	
David di Donatello Awards	1972	Best Director	Brother Sun, Sister Moon	Won	
David di Donatello Awards	1979	European David	—	Won	
David di Donatello Awards	1991	Best Foreign Film	Hamlet	Won	
David di Donatello Awards	2002	Special David	—	Won	
Directors Guild of America Awards	1969	Outstanding Directing – Feature Film	Romeo and Juliet	Nominated	
Flaiano Prizes	1996	Career Award	—	Won	
Globo d'oro	2013	Career Award	—	Won	
Golden Globe Awards	1969	Best Director	Romeo and Juliet	Nominated	
Golden Globe Awards	1969	Best English-Language Foreign Film	Romeo and Juliet	Won	
Golden Globe Awards	1983	Best Foreign Language Film	La Traviata	Nominated	
Golden Globe Awards	1987	Best Foreign Language Film	Otello	Nominated	
Nastro d'Argento Awards	1969	Best Director	Romeo and Juliet	Won	
Nastro d'Argento Awards	2013	Special Silver Ribbon	—	Won	
Karlovy Vary International Film Festival	1999	Crystal Globe	—	Won	
National Board of Review	1969	Best Director	Romeo and Juliet	Won	
Palm Springs International Film Festival	2003	Director's Achievement Award	—	Won	
Primetime Emmy Awards	1985	Outstanding Individual Achievement – Classical Music/Dance Programming – Directing	Pagliacci	Won	
Primetime Emmy Awards	1986	Outstanding Individual Achievements – Classical Music/Dance Programming	Great Performances: "Cavalleria Rusticana"	Won	
Razzie Awards	1982	Worst Director	Endless Love	Nominated	
Tony Awards	1962	Special Tony Award	Romeo and Juliet	Won	
Tony Awards	1963	Best Scenic Design	The Lady of the Camellias	Nominated	

== Selected filmography ==
- La Bohème (1965; production designer only)
- Florence: Days of Destruction (1966) (documentary short)
- The Taming of the Shrew (1967)
- Romeo and Juliet (1968) – Academy Award winner and nominee, director
- Brother Sun, Sister Moon (1972)
- Jesus of Nazareth (1977)
- Cavalleria rusticana (1978) with Tatiana Troyanos and Plácido Domingo (live Metropolitan Opera House – stage director)
- Pagliacci (1978) with Teresa Stratas, Sherrill Milnes and Plácido Domingo (live Metropolitan Opera House – stage director)
- Carmen (1978)
- The Champ (1979)
- Endless Love (1981) – Razzie Award nominee
- Pagliacci (1982) with Plácido Domingo and Teresa Stratas
- Cavalleria rusticana (1982) with Plácido Domingo and Elena Obraztsova
- La Bohème (1982) (live Metropolitan Opera – stage director)
- La Traviata (1982) – Academy Award nominee, BAFTA winner, art direction; with Teresa Stratas and Plácido Domingo
- Tosca (1985) (live Metropolitan Opera – stage director)
- Otello (1986) – BAFTA winner, foreign language film; with Plácido Domingo and Katia Ricciarelli
- Young Toscanini (1988)
- Hamlet (1990)
- Don Giovanni (live Metropolitan Opera – stage director)
- Don Carlo with Luciano Pavarotti and Daniela Dessì (live La Scala – stage director)
- Storia di una capinera (also known as Sparrow; 1993) with Sheherazade Ventura
- Jane Eyre (1996)
- Tea with Mussolini (1999)
- Callas Forever (2002)

== Bibliography ==
- Zeffirelli, Franco; John Tooley (interviews by Anna Tims), "How we made: Franco Zeffirelli and John Tooley on Tosca (1964)", The Guardian (London), 23 July 2012 on theguardian.com. Retrieved 11 August 2014.
