= List of compositions by Ennio Morricone =

Discography

Ennio Morricone discography
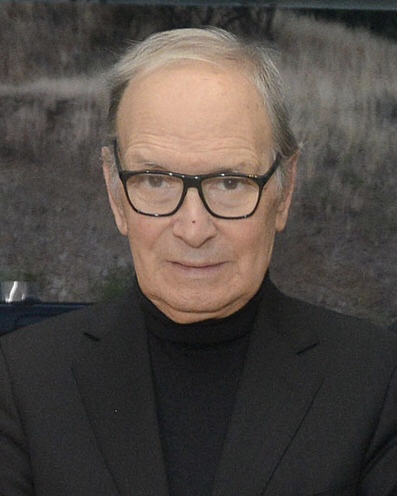
- Morricone in 2013
- Studio albums: 14
- Soundtrack albums: 470
- Live albums: 11
- Compilation albums: 116
- Tribute albums: 18
- Singles: 61
- Video albums: 4

This is a list of compositions by composer, orchestrator and conductor Ennio Morricone. He composed and arranged scores for more than 400 film and television productions. Morricone was considered one of the most influential and best-selling film composers since the late 1940s.

He has sold well over 70 million records worldwide, including 6.5 million albums and singles in France, over three million in the United States and more than two million albums in Korea.

In 1971, the composer received his first golden record (disco d'oro) for the sale of 1,000,000 records in Italy and a "Targa d'Oro" for the worldwide sales of 22 million.

His score for Sergio Leone's Once Upon a Time in the West is one of the top 5 best-selling original instrumental scores in the world today, with about 10 million copies sold.

His score for The Mission (1986) was also at one point the world's best selling score. Morricone's music for The Good, the Bad and the Ugly (1966) and Le Professionnel (1981) each sold over 3 million copies worldwide.

== Filmography ==
=== 1950s ===
Year	Title	Director	Notes
1955	Abandoned	Francesco Maselli	Orchestrations only Score composed by Giovanni Fusco
1959	La duchessa di Santa Lucia	Roberto Bianchi Montero	Orchestrations only Score composed by Giorgio Fabor
1959	Death of a Friend	Franco Rossi	Conducting only Score composed by Mario Nascimbene

=== 1960s ===
Year	Title	Director	Notes	Latest CD / Digital Release
1960	Run with the Devil	Mario Camerini	Orchestrations only Score composed by Piero Piccioni,	
1960	Lipstick	Damiano Damiani	Orchestrations only Score composed by Giovanni Fusco	
1960	L'Avventura	Michelangelo Antonioni	Orchestrations only Score composed by Giovanni Fusco	
1960	Le pillole di Ercole	Luciano Salce	Rejected score Replaced by Armando Trovajoli	
1961	The Fascist	Luciano Salce	First full score	
1961	The Last Judgment	Vittorio De Sica	Arrangements and Conducting only Score composed by Alessandro Cicognini,	
1962	L'italiano ha 50 anni	Francomaria Trapani	Orchestrations only Composed by Gino Peguri,	
1962	Gli italiani e le vacanze	Filippo Walter Ratti	Documentary film	
1962	I motorizzati	Camillo Mastrocinque		
1962	Crazy Desire	Luciano Salce		
1962	Il Sorpasso	Dino Risi	Orchestrations only Score composed by Riz Ortolani	
1962	Those Two in the Legion	Lucio Fulci	Arrangements and Conducting only Score composed by Luis Bacalov	
1962	Eighteen in the Sun	Camillo Mastrocinque		
1962	A Girl... and a Million	Luciano Salce		
1963	Violenza segreta	Giorgio Moser	Orchestrations only Score composed by Giovanni Fusco	
1963	Il Successo	Dino Risi		Beat Records / BCM9615 / 2023
1963	The Lizards	Lina Wertmüller	—N/a	
1963	Le monachine	Luciano Salce	—N/a	
1963	El Greco	—N/a		
1963	Gunfight at Red Sands	Ricardo Blasco; Mario Caiano	First Western film score	
1964	Una Nuova fonte di energia	Daniele G. Luisi	Documentary film	
1964	Malamondo	Paolo Cavara	—N/a	CAM Sugar / 2021
1964	I maniaci	Lucio Fulci	Composed with Carlo Rustichelli	
1964	I marziani hanno 12 mani	Franco Castellano; Giuseppe Moccia	—N/a	
1964	In ginocchio da te	Ettore Maria Fizzarotti	—N/a	
1964	A Fistful of Dollars	Sergio Leone	Silver Ribbon Award for Best Score	Beat Records / CDX1036 / 2024
1964	Bullets Don't Argue	Mario Caiano	—N/a	Beat Records / BCM9601 / 2024
1964	Two Escape from Sing Sing	Lucio Fulci	—N/a	Quartet Records / QR445 / 2021
1964	Before the Revolution	Bernardo Bertolucci	—N/a	
1964	Full Hearts and Empty Pockets	Camillo Mastrocinque	—N/a	Beat Records / BCM9622 / 2025
1965	A Pistol for Ringo	Duccio Tessari	—N/a	Quartet Records / QR550 / 2024
1965	Nightmare Castle	Mario Caiano	First horror film score	Beat Records / BCM9618 / 2024
1965	Agent 077: Mission Bloody Mary	Sergio Grieco	Title song only Score composed by Angelo Francesco Lavagnino	
1965	Highest Pressure	Enzo Trapani	Composed with Luis Enriquez Bacalov	
1965	Slalom	Luciano Salce	—N/a	
1965	Menage all'italiana	Franco Indovina	—N/a	
1965	Fists in the Pocket	Marco Bellocchio	—N/a	
1965	Thrilling	Carlo Lizzani; Gian Luigi Polidoro; Ettore Scola	Composed with Bruno Nicolai	
1965	Non son degno di te	Ettore Maria Fizzarotti	—N/a	
1965	Se non avessi più te	Ettore Maria Fizzarotti		
1965	Idoli controluce	Enzo Battaglia	—N/a	Beat Records / BCM9622 / 2025
1965	The Return of Ringo	Duccio Tessari	—N/a	Quartet Records / QR550 / 2024
1965	For a Few Dollars More	Sergio Leone	—N/a	
1966	Seven Guns for the MacGregors	Franco Giraldi	—N/a	
1966	Wake Up and Die	Carlo Lizzani	—N/a	GDM / CD CLUB 7117 / 2012
1966	The Hawks and the Sparrows	Pier Paolo Pasolini	Nominated – Silver Ribbon Award for Best Score	
1966	El Greco	Luciano Salce	—N/a	Quartet Records / QR604 / 2025
1966	Agent 505: Death Trap in Beirut	Manfred R. Köhler	Composed with Bruno Nicolai	Beat Records / BCM9615 / 2023
1966	The Battle of Algiers	Gillo Pontecorvo	Composed with Pontecorvo	Quartet Records / QR193 / 2015
1966	The Hills Run Red	Carlo Lizzani	—N/a	Quartet Records / QRSCE007 / 2010
1966	The Bible: In the Beginning	John Huston	First American film Uncredited; Composed with Toshiro Mayuzumi	
1966	Almost a Man	Vittorio De Seta	—N/a	
1966	How I Learned to Love Women	Luciano Salce	—N/a	GDM / 4406 / 2016
1966	For a Few Extra Dollars	Giorgio Ferroni	Composed with Gianni Ferrio	
1966	Florence: Days of Destruction	Franco Zeffirelli	Documentary film	
1966	Navajo Joe	Sergio Corbucci	—N/a	Film Score Monthly / FSM Vol. 10 No. 14 / 2007
1966	The Good, the Bad and the Ugly	Sergio Leone	—N/a	Quartet Records / QR436 / 2021
1967	The Hellbenders	Sergio Corbucci	—N/a	
1967	The Witches	Luchino Visconti; Mauro Bolognini; Pier Paolo Pasolini; Franco Rossi; Vittorio De Sica	Composed with Piero Piccioni	
1967	The Big Gundown	Sergio Sollima	—N/a	Beat Records / BCM9603 / 2022
1967	O.K. Connery	Alberto De Martino	Composed with Bruno Nicolai	
1967	Matchless	Alberto Lattuada	—N/a	
1967	Matchless	Alberto Lattuada	Composed with Gino Marinuzzi Jr.	
1967	Death Rides a Horse	Giulio Petroni	—N/a	Beat Records / BCM9589 / 2021
1967	The Rover	Terence Young	—N/a	
1967	Her Harem	Marco Ferreri	—N/a	
1967	The Girl and the General	Pasquale Festa Campanile	—N/a	
1967	China is Near	Marco Bellocchio	—N/a	
1967	Grand Slam	Giuliano Montaldo	—N/a	
1967	Face to Face	Sergio Sollima	—N/a	
1967	Arabella	Mauro Bolognini	—N/a	Quartet Records / QR578 / 2025
1967	Garden of Delights	Silvano Agosti	—N/a	
1967	Dirty Heroes	Alberto de Martino	Composed with Bruno Nicolai	
1968	Danger: Diabolik	Mario Bava	—N/a	
1968	Escalation	Roberto Faenza	—N/a	
1968	Come Play with Me	Salvatore Samperi	—N/a	
1968	A Sky Full of Stars for a Roof	Giulio Petroni	—N/a	
1968	Guns for San Sebastian	Henri Verneuil	Composed with Laurie Johnson	
1968	Comandamenti per un gangster	Alfio Caltabiano	—N/a	
1968	Run, Man, Run	Sergio Sollima	Composed with Bruno Nicolai	
1968	Theorem	Pier Paolo Pasolini	—N/a	
1968	Partner	Bernardo Bertolucci	—N/a	
1968	Galileo	Liliana Cavani	—N/a	
1968	A Quiet Place in the Country	Elio Petri	—N/a	Quartet Records / QR579 / 2025
1968	A Fine Pair	Francesco Maselli	—N/a	
1968	Bandits in Rome	Alberto De Martino	Composed with Bruno Nicolai	Quartet Records / QR441 / 2021
1968	The Great Silence	Sergio Corbucci	—N/a	
1968	The Mercenary	Sergio Corbucci	Composed with Bruno Nicolai	Beat Records / BCM9610 / 2023
1968	Once Upon a Time in the West	Sergio Leone	Nominated – Silver Ribbon Award for Best Score	
1969	Fräulein Doktor	Alberto Lattuada	—N/a	
1969	Vergogna, schifosi	Mauro Severino	—N/a	Quartet Records / QR462 / 2021
1969	Cuore di mamma	Salvatore Samperi	—N/a	Quartet Records / QR575 / 2025
1969	Alibi	Vittorio Gassman; Adolfo Celi; Luciano Lucignani	—N/a	
1969	The Lady of Monza	Eriprando Visconti	—N/a	
1969	Eat It	Francesco Casaretti	—N/a	
1969	Machine Gun McCain	Giuliano Montaldo	—N/a	Quartet Records / QR603 / 2025
1969	Metti, una sera a cena	Giuseppe Patroni Griffi	Silver Ribbon Award for Best Score	
1969	That Splendid November	Mauro Bolognini	—N/a	
1969	Tepepa	Giulio Petroni	—N/a	Beat Records / PTS001 / 2026
1969	Listen, Let's Make Love	Vittorio Caprioli	—N/a	
1969	Ecce Homo	Bruno Gaburro	—N/a	
1969	The Invisible Woman	Paolo Spinola	—N/a	Beat Records / BCM9612 / 2023
1969	What Did Stalin Do to Women?	Maurizio Liverani	—N/a	
1969	H2S	Roberto Faenza	—N/a	
1969	L'assoluto naturale	Mauro Bolognini	—N/a	
1969	The Five Man Army	Don Taylor	—N/a	
1969	Season of the Senses	Massimo Franciosa	—N/a	
1969	A Brief Season	Renato Castellani	—N/a	
1969	Unknown Woman	Luigi Comencini	—N/a	
1969	The Sicilian Clan	Henri Verneuil	—N/a	
1969	Burn!	Gillo Pontecorvo	—N/a	Quartet Records / QR594 / 2025
1969	The Red Tent	Mikhail Kalatozov	—N/a	

=== 1970s ===
Year	Title	Director	Notes	Latest CD / Digital Release
1970	Kill the Fatted Calf and Roast It	Salvatore Samperi	—N/a	
1970	Investigation of a Citizen Above Suspicion	Elio Petri	—N/a	Quartet Records / QR582 / 2025
1970	The Bird with the Crystal Plumage	Dario Argento	First collaboration with Argento	
1970	Metello	Mauro Bolognini	Nominated – Silver Ribbon Award for Best Score	Beat Records / BCM9611 / 2024
1970	The Most Beautiful Wife	Damiano Damiani	—N/a	
1970	The Fifth Day of Peace	Giuliano Montaldo	—N/a	
1970	I cannibali	Liliana Cavani	—N/a	
1970	Two Mules for Sister Sara	Don Siegel	—N/a	
1970	Hornets' Nest	Phil Karlson	—N/a	
1970	Violent City	Sergio Sollima	—N/a	
1970	When Women Had Tails	Pasquale Festa Campanile	—N/a	
1970	Forbidden Photos of a Lady Above Suspicion	Luciano Ercoli	—N/a	Beat Records / BCM9613 / 2023
1970	The Voyeur	Franco Indovina	—N/a	
1970	Compañeros	Sergio Corbucci	—N/a	Beat Records / BCM9591 / 2021
1970	La califfa	Alberto Bevilacqua	—N/a	
1971	Tre nel mille	Franco Indovina	—N/a	
1971	The Cat o' Nine Tails	Dario Argento	—N/a	
1971	A Lizard in a Woman's Skin	Lucio Fulci	—N/a	
1971	Sacco & Vanzetti	Giuliano Montaldo	Composed with Joan Baez, Silver Ribbon Award for Best Score	
1971	Veruschka: Poetry of a Woman	Franco Rubartelli	—N/a	Quartet Records / QR574 / 2025
1971	Cold Eyes of Fear	Enzo G. Castellari	—N/a	Beat Records / BCM9600 / 2021
1971	The Decameron	Pier Paolo Pasolini	—N/a	
1971	Black Belly of the Tarantula	Paolo Cavara	—N/a	
1971	The Fifth Cord	Luigi Bazzoni	—N/a	Quartet Records / QRLP48 / 2024
1971	Without Apparent Motive	Philippe Labro	—N/a	
1971	The Working Class Goes to Heaven	Elio Petri	—N/a	Quartet Records / QR580 / 2025
1971	'Tis Pity She's a Whore	Giuseppe Patroni Griffi	—N/a	
1971	Three women – 1943: An Encounter	Alfredo Giannetti	—N/a	
1971	Three women – The Automobile	Alfredo Giannetti	—N/a	
1971	Three women – The Sciantosa	Alfredo Giannetti	—N/a	
1971	The Case is Closed, Forget It	Damiano Damiani	—N/a	
1971	The Burglars	Henri Verneuil	—N/a	
1971	Short Night of Glass Dolls	Aldo Lado	—N/a	Quartet Records / QR556 / 2024
1971	Duck, You Sucker!	Sergio Leone	—N/a	
1971	Incontro	Piero Schivazappa	—N/a	
1971	Oceano	Folco Quilici	Documentary film	Quartet Records / QR597 / 2025
1971	Maddalena	Jerzy Kawalerowicz	Features "Chi mai"	Quartet Records / QR468 / 2021
1971	Four Flies on Grey Velvet	Dario Argento	—N/a	
1972	1870	Alfredo Giannetti	—N/a	
1972	Chronicles of a Homicide	Mauro Bolognini	—N/a	
1972	The Sicilian Checkmate	Florestano Vancini	—N/a	
1972	My Dear Killer	Tonino Valerii	—N/a	
1972	This Kind of Love	Alberto Bevilacqua	—N/a	Quartet Records / QR596 / 2025
1972	Winged Devils	Duccio Tessari	—N/a	
1972	When Women Lost Their Tales	Pasquale Festa Campanile	Composed with Bruno Nicolai	
1972	What Have You Done to Solange?	Massimo Dallamano	—N/a	Quartet Records / QR552 / 2024
1972	Devil in the Brain	Sergio Sollima	—N/a	Beat Records / BCM9627 / 2026
1972	Who Saw Her Die?	Aldo Lado	—N/a	
1972	Anche se volessi lavorare, che faccio?	Flavio Mogherini	—N/a	
1972	When Man is the Prey	Vittorio De Sisti	—N/a	
1972	Sonny and Jed	Sergio Corbucci	—N/a	
1972	Bluebeard	Edward Dmytryk	—N/a	
1972	The Canterbury Tales	Pier Paolo Pasolini	—N/a	
1972	The Master and Margaret	Aleksandar Petrović	—N/a	
1972	The Assassination (film)	Yves Boisset	—N/a	
1972	Life is Tough, Eh Providence?	Giulio Petroni	—N/a	Beat Records / BCM9608 / 2022
1972	La cosa buffa	Aldo Lado	—N/a	
1972	D'amore si muore	Carlo Carunchio	—N/a	
1972	I figli chiedono perché	Nino Zanchin	—N/a	
1972	The Master Touch	Michele Lupo	—N/a	
1972	What Am I Doing in the Middle of a Revolution?	Sergio Corbucci	—N/a	Beat Records / BCM9607 / 2023
1973	Fiorina la vacca	Vittorio De Sisti	—N/a	
1973	Night Flight from Moscow	Henri Verneuil	—N/a	Beat Records / BCM9592 / 2022
1973	Crescete e moltiplicatevi	Giulio Petroni	—N/a	
1973	When Love Is Lust	Vittorio De Sisti	—N/a	Decca / 0923382 / 2022
1973	Property is No Longer a Theft	Elio Petri	—N/a	Quartet Records / QR581 / 2025
1973	Revolver	Sergio Sollima	—N/a	Quartet Records / QR593 / 2025
1973	Woman Buried Alive	Aldo Lado	—N/a	Beat Records / CDCR153 / 2025
1973	Massacre in Rome	George P. Cosmatos	—N/a	
1973	Giordano Bruno	Giuliano Montaldo	—N/a	Quartet Records / QR602 / 2025
1973	Here We Go Again, Eh Providence?	Alberto De Martino	Composed with Bruno Nicolai	Beat Records / BCM9608 / 2022
1973	My Name Is Nobody	Tonino Valerii	—N/a	Beat Records / BCM9595 / 2021
1974	The Devil Is a Woman	Damiano Damiani	—N/a	
1974	Sarah's Last Man	Maria Virginia Onorato	—N/a	Quartet Records / QR510 / 2023
1974	Spasmo	Umberto Lenzi	—N/a	
1974	Last Days of Mussolini	Carlo Lizzani	—N/a	
1974	Around the World with Peynet's Lovers	Cesare Perfetto	Composed with Alessandro Alessandroni	
1974	Sex Advice	Vittorio De Sisti	—N/a	
1974	The Infernal Trio	Francis Girod	—N/a	
1974	Arabian Nights	Pier Paolo Pasolini	—N/a	Quartet Records / QR503 / 2022
1974	The Cousin	Aldo Lado	—N/a	CAM / Digital / 2025
1974	Almost Human	Umberto Lenzi	—N/a	
1974	Allonsanfàn	Paolo Taviani, Vittorio Taviani	—N/a	
1974	The Murri Affair	Mauro Bolognini	—N/a	
1974	The Secret	Robert Enrico	—N/a	Quartet Records / QR514 / 2023
1974	The Antichrist	Alberto De Martino	Composed with Bruno Nicolai	Beat Records / CDCR153 / 2025
1975	Autopsy (1975 film)	Armando Crispino	—N/a	
1975	Libera, My Love	Mauro Bolognini	—N/a	
1975	The Teenage Prostitution Racket	Mino Giarda, Carlo Lizzani	—N/a	CAM / Digital / 2024
1975	Last Stop on the Night Train	Aldo Lado	—N/a	
1975	The Night Caller	Henri Verneuil	—N/a	
1975	Space 1999	Lee H. Katzin, David Tomblin, and Ray Austin	—N/a	Beat Records / BCM9594 / 2023
1975	Léonor	Juan Luis Buñuel	—N/a	
1975	End of the Game	Maximilian Schell	—N/a	
1975	Weak Spot	Peter Fleischmann	—N/a	
1975	The Divine Nymph	Giuseppe Patroni Griffi	Composed with Cesare Andrea Bixio	
1975	Lips of Lurid Blue	Giulio Petroni	—N/a	
1975	The Flower in His Mouth	Luigi Zampa	—N/a	
1975	Down the Ancient Stairs	Mauro Bolognini	—N/a	
1975	The "Human" Factor	Edward Dmytryk	—N/a	Quartet Records / QR509 / 2023
1975	Salò, or the 120 Days of Sodom	Pier Paolo Pasolini	—N/a	
1975	The Sunday Woman	Luigi Comencini	—N/a	
1975	A Genius, Two Partners and a Dupe	Damiano Damiani	—N/a	
1975	Eye of the Cat	Alberto Bevilacqua	Composed with Clément Janequin	
1976	San Babila-8 P.M.	Carlo Lizzani	—N/a	
1976	Todo modo	Elio Petri	—N/a	
1976	1900	Bernardo Bertolucci	—N/a	
1976	A Sold Life	Aldo Florio	—N/a	
1976	And Agnes Chose to Die	Giuliano Montaldo	—N/a	
1976	The Inheritance	Mauro Bolognini	—N/a	
1976	The Desert of the Tartars	Valerio Zurlini	—N/a	Quartet Records / QR563 / 2024
1976	Down the Ancient Staircase	Mauro Bolognini	—N/a	
1977	Rene the Cane	Francis Girod	—N/a	
1977	Hitch-Hike	Pasquale Festa Campanile	—N/a	
1977	Stato interessante	Sergio Nasca	—N/a	Quartet Records / QR616 / 2026
1977	Exorcist II: The Heretic	John Boorman	—N/a	
1977	Orca	Michael Anderson	—N/a	
1977	Holocaust 2000	Alberto De Martino	—N/a	
1977	I Am the Law	Pasquale Squitieri	—N/a	
1977	Il mostro	Luigi Zampa	—N/a	
1977	The Cat	Luigi Comencini	—N/a	
1978	L'immoralità	Massimo Pirri	—N/a	
1978	One, Two, Two : 122, rue de Provence	Christian Gion	—N/a	
1978	Days of Heaven	Terrence Malick	Composed with Leo Kottke, BAFTA Award for Best Film Music; Nominated – Academy Award for Best Original Score	
1978	Stay As You Are	Alberto Lattuada	—N/a	
1978	La Cage aux Folles	Édouard Molinaro	—N/a	
1978	Corleone	Pasquale Squitieri	—N/a	
1978	Where Are You Going on Holiday?	Mauro Bolognini	Segment: "Sarò tutta per te"	
1979	A Dangerous Toy	Giuliano Montaldo	—N/a	
1979	The Humanoid	Aldo Lado	—N/a	Quartet Records / QR553 / 2024
1979	Dedicated to the Aegean Sea	Masuo Ikeda	—N/a	
1979	Lovers and Liars	Mario Monicelli	—N/a	
1979	Bloodline	Terence Young	—N/a	Quartet Records / QR542 / 2023
1979	The Meadow	Paolo Taviani, Vittorio Taviani	—N/a	
1979	Venetian Lies	Stefano Rolla	—N/a	
1979	Ogro	Gillo Pontecorvo	—N/a	
1979	La Luna	Bernardo Bertolucci	—N/a	
1979	Buone notizie	Elio Petri	—N/a	
1979	I as in Icarus	Henri Verneuil	Nominated – César Award for Best Original Music	

=== 1980s ===
Year	Title	Director	Notes	Latest CD / Digital Release
1980	The Blue-Eyed Bandit	Alfredo Giannetti	—N/a	CAM Sugar / 2021
1980	Il ladrone	Pasquale Festa Campanile	—N/a	
1980	La Cage aux Folles II	Edouard Molinaro	—N/a	
1980	Si salvi chi vuole	Roberto Faenza	—N/a	
1980	The Island	Michael Ritchie	—N/a	
1980	Fun is Beautiful	Carlo Verdone	—N/a	Cinevox / OSTPK 045 / 2023
1980	Men or Not Men	Valentino Orsini	—N/a	
1980	Windows	Gordon Willis	—N/a	
1981	Bianco, rosso e Verdone	Carlo Verdone	Nominated – David di Donatello for Best Score	
1981	Butterfly	Matt Cimber	Nominated – Golden Globe Award for Best Original Song; Nominated – Golden Raspberry Award for Worst Original Song; Nominated – Golden Raspberry Award for Worst Musical Score	
1981	Espion, lève-toi	Yves Boisset	—N/a	
1981	The Lady Banker	Francis Girod	—N/a	
1981	La disubbidienza	Aldo Lado	—N/a	
1981	Tragedy of a Ridiculous Man	Bernardo Bertolucci	—N/a	Cinevox Record / CDOSTPK053 / 2026
1981	The Lady of the Camellias	Mauro Bolognini	Nominated – David di Donatello for Best Score	
1981	The Professional	Georges Lautner	Featured "Chi mai" from "Maddalena" Nominated – César Award for Best Original Music	
1981	Buddy Goes West	Michele Lupo	—N/a	Cinevox / OSTPK 043 / 2022
1981	So Fine	Andrew Bergman	—N/a	
1981	White Dog	Samuel Fuller	—N/a	
1982	Copkiller	Roberto Faenza	—N/a	Quartet Records / QR586 / 2025
1982	A Time to Die	Matt Cimber	Composed with Robert O. Ragland	
1982	Blood Link	Alberto De Martino	—N/a	
1982	Nana	Dan Wolman	—N/a	
1982	The Thing	John Carpenter	Nominated – Golden Raspberry Award for Worst Musical Score	
1983	The Ruffian	José Giovanni	—N/a	Music Box Records / MBR-237 / 2024
1983	The Key	Tinto Brass	—N/a	
1983	Hundra	Matt Cimber	—N/a	
1983	Treasure of the Four Crowns	Ferdinando Baldi	—N/a	
1983	Le Marginal	Jacques Deray	—N/a	
1983	Thieves After Dark	Samuel Fuller	—N/a	
1983	Sahara	Andrew V. McLaglen	—N/a	
1984	Once Upon a Time in America	Sergio Leone	BAFTA Award for Best Film Music; Silver Ribbon Award for Best Score; Nominated – Golden Globe Award for Best Original Score	
1984	La Cage aux Folles III: The Wedding	Georges Lautner		
1985	Red Sonja	Richard Fleischer	—N/a	
1985	The Trap	Giuseppe Patroni Griffi	—N/a	
1985	The Repenter	Pasquale Squitieri	—N/a	Beat Records / BCM9629 / 2026
1986	The Venetian Woman	Mauro Bolognini	—N/a	
1986	The Mission	Roland Joffé	BAFTA Award for Best Film Music; Golden Globe Award for Best Original Score; Nominated – Academy Award for Best Original Score	
1987	Control	Giuliano Montaldo	—N/a	
1987	Farewell Moscow	Mauro Bolognini	—N/a	
1987	The Gold Rimmed Glasses	Giuliano Montaldo	David di Donatello for Best Score	
1987	Rampage	William Friedkin	—N/a	
1987	Quartiere	Silvano Agosti	—N/a	
1987	The Untouchables	Brian De Palma	BAFTA Award for Best Film Music; Grammy Award for Best Score Soundtrack for Visual Media; Silver Ribbon Award for Best Score; Nominated – Academy Award for Best Original Score; Nominated – Golden Globe Award for Best Original Score	
1988	A Time of Destiny	Gregory Nava	—N/a	
1988	Frantic	Roman Polanski	—N/a	
1988	Cinema Paradiso	Giuseppe Tornatore	Composed with Andrea Morricone BAFTA Award for Best Film Music; David di Donatello for Best Score; Nominated – Silver Ribbon Award for Best Score	
1989	Time to Kill	Giuliano Montaldo	—N/a	
1989	Casualties of War	Brian De Palma	Nominated – Golden Globe Award for Best Original Score	
1989	Fat Man and Little Boy	Roland Joffé	—N/a	

=== 1990s ===
Year	Title	Director	Notes	Latest CD / Digital Release
1990	Tie Me Up! Tie Me Down!	Pedro Almodóvar	Nominated – Goya Award for Best Original Score	
1990	The Palermo Connection	Francesco Rosi	—N/a	
1990	Hamlet	Franco Zeffirelli	—N/a	
1990	The Bachelor	Roberto Faenza	Nominated – David di Donatello for Best Score	
1990	The Big Man	David Leland	—N/aAKA Crossing the Line	
1990	Everybody's Fine	Giuseppe Tornatore	David di Donatello for Best Score	
1990	State of Grace	Phil Joanou	—N/a	
1990	Tre colonne in cronaca	Carlo Vanzina	—N/a	
1991	Bugsy	Barry Levinson	Nominated – Academy Award for Best Original Score; Nominated – Golden Globe Award for Best Original Score	
1991	Especially on Sunday	Marco Tullio Giordana; Giuseppe Tornatore	Composed with Andrea Morricone	
1991	Husband and Lovers	Mauro Bolognini	—N/a	
1991	Money	Steven Hilliard Stern	—N/a	Beat Records / BCM9599 / 2023
1992	City of Joy	Roland Joffé	—N/a	
1993	In the Line of Fire	Wolfgang Petersen	—N/a	
1993	Jonah Who Lived in the Whale	Roberto Faenza	David di Donatello for Best Score; Nominated – Silver Ribbon Award for Best Score	
1993	The Long Silence	Margarethe von Trotta	—N/a	
1993	The Escort	Ricky Tognazzi	Nominated – David di Donatello for Best Score	
1994	A Pure Formality	Giuseppe Tornatore	—N/a	Quartet Records / QR601 / 2025
1994	Love Affair	Glenn Gordon Caron	—N/a	
1994	Disclosure	Barry Levinson	—N/a	
1994	Wolf	Mike Nichols	Nominated – Grammy Award for Best Score Soundtrack for Visual Media	
1995	The Star Maker	Giuseppe Tornatore	Nominated – David di Donatello for Best Score; Nominated – Grammy Award for Best Score Soundtrack for Visual Media	
1995	Who Killed Pasolini	Marco Tullio Giordana	—N/a	
1995	The Night and the Moment	Anna Maria Tatò	—N/a	Beat Records / BCM9628 / 2026
1995	Sostiene Pereira	Roberto Faenza	—N/a	
1996	The Stendahl Syndrome	Dario Argento	—N/a	
1996	La Lupa	Gabriele Lavia	—N/a	
1996	We Free Kings	Sergio Citti	—N/a	
1996	The Nymph	Lina Wertmüller	—N/a	
1996	Strangled Lives	Ricky Tognazzi	—N/a	
1997	Cartoni animati	Franco Citti; Sergio Citti	—N/a	
1997	Lolita	Adrian Lyne	—N/a	
1997	U Turn	Oliver Stone	—N/a	
1998	The Legend of 1900	Giuseppe Tornatore	Golden Globe Award for Best Original Score; Nominated – David di Donatello for Best Score	
1998	The Phantom of the Opera	Dario Argento	—N/a	
1998	Bulworth	Warren Beatty	Nominated – Grammy Award for Best Score Soundtrack for Visual Media	
1998	What Dreams May Come	Vincent Ward	Rejected Score; Replaced by Michael Kamen	

=== 2000s ===
Year	Title	Director	Notes
2000	Canone Inverso – Making Love	Ricky Tognazzi	David di Donatello for Best Score; Silver Ribbon Award for Best Score
2000	Malèna	Giuseppe Tornatore	Nominated – Academy Award for Best Original Score; Nominated – David di Donatello for Best Score; Nominated – Golden Globe Award for Best Original Score
2000	Mission to Mars	Brian De Palma	—N/a
2001	Vatel	Roland Joffé	—N/a
2001	Aida of the Trees	Guido Manuli	—N/a
2001	Un altro mondo è possibile	Various	Documentary film
2001	La ragion pura	Silvano Agosti	—N/a
2002	Senso '45	Tinto Brass	—N/a
2002	Ripley's Game	Liliana Cavani	—N/a
2002	Carlo Giuliani, Boy	Francesca Comencini	Documentary film
2003	The End of a Mystery	Miguel Hermoso	—N/a
2003	Instructing the Heart	Giovanni Morricone	Composed with Andrea Morricone Nominated – Silver Ribbon Award for Best Score
2004	72 Meters	Vladimir Khotinenko	—N/a
2004	Guardians of the Clouds	Luciano Odorisio	—N/a
2005	Fateless	Lajos Koltai	—N/a
2005	E ridendo l'uccise	Florestano Vancini	—N/a
2006	The Unknown Woman	Giuseppe Tornatore	David di Donatello for Best Score
2006	Libertas	Veljko Bulajic	—N/a
2006	A Crime	Manuel Pradal	Music used from Mosca Addio (1987) & Dimenticare Palermo (1990)
2008	The Demons of St. Petersberg	Giuliano Montaldo	Nominated – Silver Ribbon Award for Best Score
2009	Baaria	Giuseppe Tornatore	David di Donatello for Best Score

=== 2010s ===
Year	Title	Director	Notes
2011	Love Story	Florian Habicht	—N/a
2013	The Best Offer	Giuseppe Tornatore	David di Donatello for Best Score; Silver Ribbon Award for Best Score
2015	Come What May	Christian Carion	Nominated – César Award for Best Original Music
2015	Il Sole è buio	Giuseppe Papasso	Documentary film Composed with Paolo Vivaldi
2015	The Hateful Eight	Quentin Tarantino	Academy Award for Best Original Score; ASCAP Award for Best Film Score; BAFTA Award for Best Film Music; Golden Globe Award for Best Original Score; Nominated – Grammy Award for Best Score Soundtrack for Visual Media; Nominated – Saturn Award for Best Music
2016	The Correspondence	Giuseppe Tornatore	Nominated – David di Donatello for Best Score

== Television films and series ==
=== 1960s ===
Year	Title	Notes
1960	Il Lieto Fine	Television film
1960	Gente che va e gente che viene	Television film
1961	Enrico '61	Documentary special
1961	Alla scoperta dell'America	Documentary special
1963-64	Smash	Theme music & 10 episodes

=== 1970s ===
Year	Title	Notes
1970-71	The Virginian	Theme music; Season 9
1973	Nessuno deve sapere	Theme music & 6 episodes
1975	Moses the Lawgiver	Miniseries
1975-77	Space: 1999	Italian-language version Theme music & 48 episodes
1976	Drammi gotici	Television film
1977	Forza Italia!	Documentary special
1978	Noi lazzaroni	Television film
1978	Il prigioniero	Television film
1978	1978 FIFA World Cup	Theme music
1978	Le mani sporche	Miniseries
1979	Orient-Express	Miniseries
1979	Dietro il processo	Television film

=== 1980s ===
Year	Title	Notes
1981	The Life and Times of David Lloyd George	Theme music & 9 episodes
1982	Marco Polo	Miniseries
1983	The Scarlet and the Black	Television film
1985	Via Mala	Miniseries
1985-95	La Piovra	Theme music & 36 episodes 7 d'Or for Best Music
1986	C.A.T. Squad	Television film
1987	The Secret of the Sahara	Miniseries
1987	The Betrothed	Theme music & 7 episodes
1988	Gli indifferenti	Miniseries
1989	The Endless Game	Miniseries
1989	Gli angeli del potere	Television film

=== 1990s ===
Year	Title	Notes
1990	Cacciatore di nave	Television film
1990	Voyage of Terror: The Achille Lauro Affair	Television film
1991	Il principe del deserto	Miniseries
1991	Piazza di Spagna	Theme music & 5 episodes
1992	Una storia italiana	Miniseries
1994	Missus	Miniseries
1994	Genesis: The Creation and the Flood	Television film
1994	Jacob	Television film
1995	Il barone	Miniseries
1996	Samson and Delilah	Television film
1997	Solomon	Television film
1997	In fondo al cuore	Miniseries
1997	Nostromo	Miniseries
1997	Il quarto re	Television film
1998	La casa bruciata	Television film
1998	Ultimo	Television film
1998	In fondo al cuore	Television film
1999	Ultimo 2 – La sfida	Television film
1999	Tower of the Firstborn	Television film
1999	I guardiani del cielo	Miniseries
1999	Nana	Miniseries

=== 2000s ===
Year	Title	Notes		
2000	Padre Pio: Between Heaven and Earth	Miniseries		
2001	La Piovra 10	Television film		
2002	Perlasca, un Eroe Italiano	Miniseries		
2002	Un difetto di famiglia	Miniseries		
2002	Il diario di Matilde Manzoni	Miniseries		
2002-03	Musashi	Theme music & 49 episodes		
2003	The Good Pope: Pope John XXIII	Miniseries		
2003	Maria Goretti	Television film		
2003	ICS L'amore ti da' un nome	Television film		
2003	Charlie Chaplin – Les années suisses	Documentary special		
2004	Ultimo 3 – L'infiltrato	Television film		
2005	Il Cuore nel Pozzo	Miniseries		
2005	Karol: A Man Who Became Pope	Miniseries		
2005	Cefalonia	Television film		
2005	Lucia	Television film		
2005	Bartali: The Iron Man	Miniseries		
2006	Karol: The Pope, The Man	Miniseries		
2006	La provinciale	Miniseries		
2006	Giovanni Falcone – L'uomo che sfidò Cosa Nostra	Miniseries		
2007	L'Ultimo dei corleonesi	Television film		
2008	Résolution 819	Television film		
2009	Pane e libertà	Miniseries		
2009	Quatraro Mysteriet	Theme music & 8 episodes		
2010	Mi Ricordo Anna Frank	Television film		
2010		Television film	Come un delfino – La serie	Theme music & 6 episodes
2012-13	L'isola	Television film	Theme music & 12 episodes	
2012	Sabato, domenica e lunedì	Television film	Television film	
2012	Paolo Borsellino: The 57 Days	Television film	Television film	
2013	Ultimo 4 – L'occhio del falco	Miniseries		

== Stage productions ==
- Il Lieto fine (Luciano Salce, 1959)
- Il Pappa Reale (Luciano Salce, 1960)
- Non approfondire (Enzo Trapani, 1961)
- La Chasse aux corbeaux (Anton Giulio Majano, 1962)
- Rascelinaria (Pietro Garinei, Sandro Giovannini, 1962)
- Filumena Marturano (2010)

== Radio productions ==
- Ventimila leghe sotto i mari (Francesco Ghedini, 1961)
- Tiempe d'ammore (Fausto Cigliano, Achille Millo, 1961)

== Advertising campaigns ==
Since 1984, Ennio Morricone composed original background music to several advertising campaigns. Most of the commercials were directed by Giuseppe Tornatore.

Year	Title	Producer	Director
1984	Motta	Motta	N/A
1989	Museo delle tradizioni e arti contadine	Mutac	Giuseppe Tornatore
1990	Grandmother	Chef Boyardee	Giuseppe Tornatore
1990	Mulino Bianco	Barilla Group	Giuseppe Tornatore
1990	Italiana petroli	Anonima Petroli Italiana	Giuseppe Tornatore
1995	Profumo	Dolce & Gabbana	Giuseppe Tornatore
1996	Pomeriggi al cinema	Pomeriggi al cinema	Giuseppe Tornatore
1996	San Pellegrino Calze (starring Antonio Banderas)	San Pellegrino Calze	Giuseppe Tornatore
2001	Come vorresti che fosse il futuro?	Telecom Italia	Andrew Douglas
2002	Il Cinema	Dolce & Gabbana	Giuseppe Tornatore
2002	Nissan El Grand	Nissan	Giuseppe Tornatore
2003	Sicily (starring Monica Bellucci)	Dolce & Gabbana	Giuseppe Tornatore
2003	Sky Cinema (starring John Travolta)	Sky Cinema	Giuseppe Tornatore
2008	Lancia Delta (starring Richard Gere)	Lancia	Harald Zwart
2009	Rose The One / L'Eau The One (starring Scarlett Johansson)	Dolce & Gabbana	Jean-Baptiste Mondino
2009	Mediaset Premium	Mediaset Premium	Matteo Pellegrini
2010	The One Gentleman	Dolce & Gabbana	Jean-Baptiste Mondino
2011	La Bellezza dello Spazio	Lancia	Ago Panini
2012	The One – Sport (starring Adam Senn)	Dolce & Gabbana	Mariano Vivanco
2013	Dolce, the Perfume	Dolce & Gabbana	Giuseppe Tornatore
2015	Dolce Rosa Excelsa (starring Sophia Loren)	Dolce & Gabbana	Giuseppe Tornatore
2015	Non è una crociera qualsiasi	MSC Crociere	Daniel Barber

== Selected films with music by Morricone ==
Year	Film	Director	Notes
1963	Gli imbroglioni	Lucio Fulci	
1963	Prima della rivoluzione	Bernardo Bertolucci	Songs of Morricone and Gino Paoli
1964	In ginocchio da te	Ettore Maria Fizzarotti	
1965	Non son degno di te	Ettore Maria Fizzarotti	
1965	Se non avessi più te	Ettore Maria Fizzarotti	
1966	Mi vedrai tornare	Ettore Maria Fizzarotti	
1966	O.K. Connery	Alberto de Martino	
1978	Germany in Autumn	Alexander Kluge	features Here's to You sung by Joan Baez
1981	Le Professionnel	Georges Lautner	It features Il vento, il grido
1995	Joseph	Roger Young	Songs of Ennio Morricone and Marco Frisina
1999	Election	Alexander Payne	music from Navajo Joe
2001	Cowboys Don't Kiss In Public	Michelle Trudo	
2003-04	Kill Bill	Quentin Tarantino	Kill Bill Vol. 1 features the main theme from Death Rides a Horse. Kill Bill Vol.2 features the tracks "L'Arena" (from Il mercenario), "Il Tramonto" (from The Good, the Bad and the Ugly), "Per Un Pugno di Dollari" (From Per un pugno di dollari),"A Silhouette of Doom" & "The Demise of Barbara" and "The Return of Joe" (from Navajo Joe).
2004	The Life Aquatic with Steve Zissou	Wes Anderson	The Life Aquatic with Steve Zissou soundtrack features "Here's To You", featuring Joan Baez.
2006	Jackass Number Two	Jeff Tremaine	It features the song "The Ecstasy of Gold" from The Good, the Bad and the Ugly.
2007	Death Proof	Quentin Tarantino	Death Proof soundtrack features the song "Paranoia Prima" from Cat O' Nine Tails soundtrack.
2007	Hot Rod	Akiva Schaffer	Hot Rod soundtrack features the song "A Gringo Like Me".
2008	Seven Pounds	Gabriele Muccino	
2009	Inglourious Basterds	Quentin Tarantino	Inglourious Basterds soundtrack features the tracks "The Verdict (La Condanna)" (from La resa dei conti), "L'incontro Con La Figlia" (from Il ritorno di Ringo), "Il Mercenario (Ripresa)" (from Il mercenario), "Algiers 1 November 1954" (Composed with Gillo Pontecorvo; from La battaglia di Algeri), "The Surrender (La resa)" (from La resa dei conti), "Mystic and Severe" (from Death Rides a Horse), "Un Amico" (from Revolver), and "Rabbia e Tarantella" (from Allonsanfàn).
2009	Couples Retreat	Peter Billingsley	
2010	The Book of Eli	Albert Hughes/Allen Hughes	Once Upon A Time In America
2012	Django Unchained	Quentin Tarantino	The Braying Mule, Sister Sara's Theme, Un Monumento, Ancora qui (music only)
2012	The Expendables 2	Simon West	The Good, the Bad & the Ugly
2014	American Sniper	Clint Eastwood	It features the song "The Funeral" from The Return of Ringo.

== Classical (absolute) music ==
Ennio Morricone's classical compositions include over 15 piano concertos, a trumpet concerto, 30 symphonic pieces, choral music, one opera and one mass. His first classical pieces date back to the late forties.

- Il Mattino (for voice and piano) 1946
- Imitazione (for voice and piano) 1947
- Iintimità (for voice and piano) 1947
- Barcarola funebre (for piano) 1952
- Preludio a una Novella senza titolo (for piano) 1952
- Distacco I (for voice and piano) 1953
- Distacco II (for voice and piano) 1953
- Verrà la morte (for contralto and piano) 1953
- Oboe sommerso (for baritone and five instruments) 1953
- Musica (for piano and string orchestra) 1954
- Sonata (for brass ensemble, piano and timpani) 1954
- Variations on a theme by Frescobaldi (for piano) 1955
- Cantata (for orchestra and mixed chorus singing a text by Cesare Pavese) 1955
- Sestetto (for flute, oboe, bassoon, violin, viola and cello) 1955
- Twelve Variations (for oboe d'amore, cello and piano) 1956
- Invenzione, canone e ricercare (for piano) 1956
- Concerto (for orchestra) 1957
- Distanze (for violin, cello and piano) 1958
- Requiem per un destino (for mixed chorus and orchestra) 1966
- Suoni per Dino (a piece for viola virtuoso Dino Asciolla using 2 magnetic tapes) 1969
- Proibito (for 8 trumpets) 1972
- Gestazione (for female voice and instruments plus pre-recorded electronic sounds and an ad lib string orchestra) 1980
- Totem secondo (for 5 bassoons and 2 contrabassoons) 1981
- Second Concerto (for flute, cello and orchestra) 1984–85
- Four Studies (for piano) 1984–89
- Frammenti di Eros (Cantata for soprano, piano and orchestra to a text by Sergio Miceli) 1985
- Cantata per L'Europa (for soprano, two vocal recitals, mixed chorus and orchestra) 1988
- Mordenti (for harpsichord) 1988
- Epos (for orchestra) 1989
- Study (for double-bass) 1989
- Reflessi (for cello) 1989–90
- Frammenti di giochi (for violin and harp) 1990
- Third Concerto (for guitar, marimba and string orchestra) 1990–91
- UT (for trumpet, timpani, bass drum and string orchestra) dedicated to his friend trumpet player Mauro Maur 1991
- Una via crucis ('Stations of The Cross' in various vocal and instrumental combinations and in collaboration with Michele Dall'Ongaro and Egisto Macchi)
- Fourth Concerto (for organ, two trumpets, two trombones and orchestra) 1993
- Vidi aquam (for soprano and small orchestra) 1993
- Elegia per Egisto (a piece for violin dedicated to his fellow-Nuova Consonanza member Egisto Macchi) 1993
- Il silenzio, il gioco, la memoria (for a chorus of children's voices singing a text by Sergio Miceli) 1994
- Partenope (an opera with a libretto by Guido Barbieri and Sandro Cappelletto) 1996
- Passaggio secondo (for flute, oboe, clarinet, bassoon, French horn, 20 strings and a vocal recital of a text by Allen Ginsberg) 1996
- Scherzo (for violin and piano) 1996; Ombra di lontana presenza (for viola, string orchestra and magnetic tape) 1997
- Nocturne and Passacaglia (for flute, oboe, clarinet, piano and strings) 1998
- Amen (for 6 choruses of mixed voices) 1998
- Pietre (for double chorus, percussion and cello) 1999
- For the Children Killed by the Mafia (for soprano, baritone, 6 instruments and two voices reciting a text by Luciano Violente) 1999
- Abenddämmerung (for violin, cello, piano and soprano or mezzo-soprano singing a text by Heinrich Heine) 2000
- If This Is a Man (for soprano, violin, strings and vocal recital of a text by Primo Levi) 2001
- Voci dal silenzio (for vocal recital, recorded voice, chorus and orchestra) 2002
- Finale (for two organs) 2002
- Riverberi (for flute, cello and piano) 2004
- Missa Papae Francisci (mass for double chorus, orchestra and organ) 2015
- Per i 40 anni (for mixed ensemble) 2020

== Live albums ==
- Ennio Morricone live (with Metropole Orchestra) (1987)
- Concerto Premio Nino Rota (1995)
- Ennio Morricone – Live (1995)
- Morricone dirige a Morricone (1998)
- Cinema Concerto: Ennio Morricone at Santa Cecilia (1999)
- Verona Arena Concerto (2002)
- La leggenda della pianista (2003)
- Focus: Ennio Morricone & Dulce Pontes (2004)
- Voci dal silenzio (2004)
- Morricone Conducts Morricone: The Munich Concert 2004 (2006)
- Note di Pace/Peace Notes: Live at Piazza San Marco, Venice (2008)
- Giorgio Armani presents Musica per il cinema (2CD)(2012)

== Studio albums ==
=== with Gruppo di Improvvisazione di Nuova Consonanza ===
- 1966 "Nuova Consonanza", LP RCA
- 1967 "The Private Sea of Dreams" (as Il Gruppo), LP RCA Victor
- 1968 "Improvisationen" LP Deutsche Grammophon
- 1970 "The Feed-back" (as The Group), LP RCA
- 1973 "Improvvisazioni a Formazioni Variate" (also known as "Gruppo d'Improvvisazione Nuova Consonanza"), LP General Music
- 1975 "Nuova Consonanza", LP Cinevox Records. Reissue 2007 CD Bella Casa
- 1976 "Musica su Schemi", LP Cramps Records. Reissue 2002: LP Get Back, CD Ampersand
- 1992 "1967–1975", CD Edition RZ
- 2006 "Azioni", CD Die Schachtel
- 2010 "Niente", CD Cometa Edizioni Musicali. Reissue 2012 LP The Omni Recording Corporation/The Roundtable
- 2011 "Eroina", CD Cometa Edizioni Musicali

=== with Mauro Maur ===
- La Tromba Classica Contemporanea (1993, Mauro Maur & Ennio Morricone)
- In the Line of Fire (1993, Mauro Maur & Ennio Morricone)
- Mauro Maur e i suoi Solisti (1996, Mauro Maur & Ennio Morricone)

=== with Chico Buarque ===
- Per un pugno di samba (1970, Chico Buarque & Ennio Morricone)
- Sonho de um Carnaval (2000, Chico Buarque & Ennio Morricone)
- De sa terra a su xelu (2002, Clara Murtas & Ennio Morricone)

=== other ===
- Focus (2003, Ennio Morricone & Dulce Pontes)
- Guardians of the clouds (2007, Carel Kraayenhof & Ennio Morricone)
- Paradiso (2011, Hayley Westenra & Ennio Morricone)
- Morricone.Uncovered (2012, Romina Arena & Ennio Morricone)
- Morricone 60 (2016, Ennio Morricone & Czech National Symphony Orchestra)

== Selected compilations ==
- Morricone: Belmondo (1971)
- Take off: Film Hits (1978)
- Oscar Valdambrini (1982)
- His Greatest Themes (1986)
- Film Music, Vol. 1: The Collection (1987)
- Film Music, Vol. 2 (1988)
- Once Upon a Time in the West: 20 Famous Film Tracks of Ennio Morricone (1989)
- Zijn Grootste Successen (1990)
- Chamber Music (1990)
- The Legendary Italian Westerns (1990)
- Original Film Musik Von Ennio Morricone (1993)
- 93 Movie Sounds (1994)
- Classic Ennio Morricone (1994)
- Spaghetti Western: The Ennio Morricone Collection (1995)
- The Ennio Morricone Anthology: A Fistful of Film Music (1995)
- An Ennio Morricone: Dario Argento Trilogy (1995)
- Anthology: Main Titles & Rare Tracks (1995)
- With Love: Music Composed & Conducted By (1995)
- Neapolitan Songs (1995)
- Best of Ennio Morricone (BMG) (1995)
- Love Themes (1995)
- Film Hits (1995)
- Western Movie Themes from Clint Eastwood Movies (1995)
- Film Festival (1995)
- Movie Classics: The Music of Ennio Morricone & Hugo Montenegro (1996)
- TV Film Music (1996)
- Time of Adventure (1996)
- Main Titles, Vol. 1 (1965–1995) (1996)
- Magic World of Ennio Morricone (1996)
- Once Upon a Time in the Cinema (1996)
- Time for Suspense (1996)
- Fear According to Morricone (1997)
- Singles Collection, Vol. 2 (1997)
- Film Music by Ennio Morricone (Disky) (1998)
- Movie Classics (1998)
- Ennio Morricone Songbook, Vol. 2: Western Songs & Ballads (1998)
- Mondo Morricone (1999)
- 1966–1987 (1999)
- Love Themes (1999)
- Main Titles, Vol. 3: 1965–1985 (1999)
- With Love, Vol. 2 (1999)
- The Gangster Collection (1999)
- Morricone 2000 (1999)
- The Thriller Collection (1999)
- Once Upon a Time in the West (Compilation) (1999)
- Selections from Chronicle (1999)
- Genius of Ennio Morricone (2000)
- The Very Best of Ennio Morricone (2000)
- Psycho Morricone (2001)
- 40th Commemoration: Ultimate Soundtracks Collection (2001)
- 40th Commemoration: Ultimate Italian Pops Collection (2001)
- 40th Commemoration: Ultimate Mood Music Collection (2001)
- Mondo Morricone Revisited, Vol. 1 (2002)
- More Mondo Morricone Revisited, Vol. 2 (2002)
- Molto Mondo Morricone, Vol. 3 (2002)
- Morricone in the Scene: Chase Morricone (2002)
- Bizarre Morricone (2002)
- Lounge Morricone (2002)
- Notte Morricone (2002)
- Vivid Sound (2002)
- Signor Morricone Tempo (2002)
- Psichedelico Jazzistico (2004)
- Erotica Morricone: So Sweet So Sensual (2004)
- Casa Della Musica (2004)
- A Celebration of Ennio Morricone's 75th Anniversary (2004)
- Great Melodies of Ennio Morricone (2004)
- Movie Masterpieces (2004)
- Morricone Aromatico (2004)
- Once Upon a Time... The Essential Ennio Morricone (2004)
- Film Music Maestro (2004)
- The Best of Ennio Morricone (Setteottavi) (2005)
- Morricone Happening (2005)
- Most Famous Hits (2005)
- Morricone Kill: Spaghetti Western Magic from the Maestro (2005)
- Morricone High (2005)
- Morricone in Love (2005)
- Maestro (2005)
- Crime and Dissonance (2005)
- Itinerary of a Genius (2005)
- Bandes Originales de Film (2005)
- The Library, Vol. 1 (Musiche Composte Per il Cinema) (2005)
- My Favorite Ennio Morricone Music (2005)
- Ennio Morricone Deluxe (2006)
- Il West di Morricone (2006)
- Una Storia Italiana (2006)
- Most Famous Hits: Ennio Morricone – Western Film Music: The Album (2006)
- Gold Collection (2006)
- Film Music by Ennio Morricone (Silva Screen) (2006)
- Morricone Award (2007)
- Morricone: Western (2007)
- Grand Collection (2007)
- World of Ennio Morricone (2007)
- Ennio Morricone (2007)
- The Soundtracks: 75 Themes from 53 Films (2007)
- 50 Movie Theme Hits: Gold Edition, Vol. 2 (2007)
- In Lounge (2007)
- Original Songs (2007)
- Morricone Award (CD + Book) (2007)
- Made In France (2007)
- Un'ora Con Ennio Morricone (2007)
- Edda Dell'Orso performs Ennio Morricone (2 CD) (2008)
- In Lounge, Vol. 2 (2008)
- The Platinum Collection: Original Soundtrack (2008)
- Morricone In The Brain (2009)
- Ennio Morricone Earbook 4 CD (2013)
- Cinema collection – I 30 capolavori della musica da film italiana (2013)
- L'essentiel d'Ennio Morricone (2013)
- The Ennio Morricone Pop Collection, Vol. 1 (2013)
- The Ennio Morricone Pop Collection, Vol. 2 (2013)

== Remix albums ==
- Ennio Morricone Remixes Vol.1 – 3-LP / CD (2003)
- Ennio Morricone Remixes Vol.2 – 3-LP (2 CD) (2004)
- Ennio Morricone Remixes – limited 7

== Box sets ==
- Ennio Morricone Chronicles 1959-1999 (1999, 10 CD Box)
- Io (2003, 4CD Box)
- Ennio Morricone OST (2003, 4CD Box)
- Mondo Morricone: The Trilogy (2004, 3CD Box)
- Ultimate Morricone Collection (2006, 24CD Box)
- The Complete Dollars Trilogy (2008, 4CD Box)
- The Complete Edition (2008, 15CD Box)

== DVDs ==
- Man & His Music (2004)
- Morricone conducts Morricone (2006)
- Arena Concerto (2007)
- Peace Notes: Live in Venice (2008)

== Tribute albums ==
- The Big Gundown by John Zorn (1985)
- The Film Music Collection of Ennio Morricone by pianist Richard Clayderman (1990)
- Pearls – Amii Stewart Sings Ennio Morricone by Amii Stewart (1990)
- Cinema Italiano (1991) by Henry Mancini
- Morricone by saxophonist Nobuya Sugawa (1998)
- Trilogy Plays Ennio Morricone by Tristan Schulze, Daisy Joplin and Aleksey Igudesman (1998)
- The Fantastic Movie Story of Ennio Morricone by pianist Richard Clayderman (1999)
- For a Few Guitars More – A Tribute to Morricone's Spaghetti Western Themes by various artists (2002)
- Enrico Pieranunzi, Marc Johnson, Joey Baron Play Morricone (2002)
- Dear Morricone by violinist Tatsuya Yabe (2003)
- Ennio Morricone: Tribute for Piano Produced & Arranged by Jeff & Carmen Kidwell. Played by Ron Chiles (2003)
- Roman by erhuist Jia Peng Fang (2003)
- Enrico Pieranunzi, Marc Johnson, Joey Baron Play Morricone 2 (2003)
- Le Romanze di Morricone by flautist Kaori Fujii (2003)
- Yo-Yo Ma Plays Ennio Morricone (2004)
- My Favourite Ennio Morricone Music presented by Junichiro Koizumi, former prime minister of Japan (2006)
- Di Domenico Plays Morricone (2007)
- We All Love Ennio Morricone by various artists (2007)

== Selected songs ==
Year	Performer	Song title	ITA	FRA	NL	UK	USA
1962	Milva	Quattro Vestiti	–	–	–	–	–
1962	Milva	La Tua Stagione	–	–	–	–	–
1963	Gianni Morandi	Go-kart Twist	–	–	–	–	–
1963	Peter Tevis	A Gringo Like Me	–	–	–	–	–
1963	Rita Pavone	Pel di Carota	52	–	–	–	–
1964	Gianni Morandi	Per Una Notte No	–	–	–	–	–
1964	Paul Anka	Il Tuo compleanno	28	–	–	–	–
1965	Maurizio Graf	Angel Face	29	–	–	–	–
1965	Ennio Morricone & La Sua Orchestra	Il Silenzio/Parlami D'Amore Mariù	–	–	–	–	–
1965	Ennio Morricone	A Fistful of Dollars	4	62	–	–	–
1965	Ennio Morricone	A Pistol for Ringo	32	–	–	–	–
1965	Dino	Il Ragazzo di ghiaccio	26	–	–	–	–
1966	Mina	Se Telefonando	6	–	–	–	–
1966	Dino	Ho messo gli occhi su di te	–	–	–	–	–
1966	Ennio Morricone	For a Few Dollars More	5	16	–	–	–
1967	Christy	Run Run	73	–	–	–	–
1967	Ennio Morricone	The Good, the Bad and the Ugly	45	–	–	–	–
1968	Christy	Deep Down	–	–	–	–	–
1968	Hugo Montenegro	The Good, the Bad and the Ugly	–	–	–	1	2
1969	Roy Budd	Hurry To Me	73	–	–	–	–
1969	Ennio Morricone	A Man With Harmonica	–	1	–	–	–
1969	Dalida	Il Clan Dei Siciliana	29	–	–	–	–
1969	Milva	Metti una sera a cena	–	–	–	–	–
1971	Massimo Ranieri	Io e te	5	–	–	–	–
1971	Ennio Morricone/Joan Baez	The Ballad of Sacco and Vanzetti (Here's To You)	4	25	–	–	–
1971	Astrud Gilberto	Casse	–	–	–	–	–
1971	7 Mladih	Za Šaku Dolara	–	–	–	–	–
1971	Ennio Morricone/Joan Baez	Here's To You	46	2	29	–	–
1972	Milva	Mia Madre Si Chiama Francesca	–	–	–	–	–
1972	Ennio Morricone	Giù la testa	11	6	–	–	–
1973	Ennio Morricone	God With Us	–	8	–	–	–
1973	Ennio Morricone	My Name Is Nobody	–	–	–	–	–
1973	Ennio Morricone & Bruno Nicolai	Indagine / La Cosa Buffa	–	–	–	–	–
1974	Mireille Mathieu	J'oublie La Pluie et le Soleil	–	–	–	–	–
1975	Mireille Mathieu	Mon Ami de Toujours	–	–	–	–	–
1975	Ennio Morricone	Tema di Mosè	25	–	–	–	–
1976	Ennio Morricone	Once Upon a Time in the West	–	–	25	–	–
1977	I Gladrags	Sunshine / Notturno Per Tre		–	–	–	–
1978	Ennio Morricone	El Mundial 78	23	–	–	–	–
1978	Ennio Morricone	Come Maddalena (Disco 78)	–	–	–	–	–
1978	The Bombers	Mexican	–	–	–	–	–
1981	Ennio Morricone	Chi mai	–	1	–	2	–
1982	Pia Zadora	It's Wrong For Me To Love You	–	–	–	–	–
1988	The Pet Shop Boys/Ennio Morricone	It Couldn't Happen Here	–	–	–	–	–
1994	Gérard Depardieu	To Obliterate The Past	–	–	–	–	–
1998	Sarah Brightman	Nella fantasia	–	–	–	–	–
1998	Andrea Bocelli	Come Un Fiume Tu	–	–	–	–	–
1999	Ennio Morricone & Roger Waters	Lost Boys Calling	–	–	–	–	–
1999	Down Low	Once Upon a Time	3	–	–	–	–
1999	Andrea Bocelli	Un Canto	–	–	–	–	–
2001	Josh Groban	You're Still You/Cinema Paradiso	–	–	–	–	–
2004	Isobel Campbell	Argomenti	–	–	–	–	–
2006	Amii Stewart	Love Song	–	–	–	–	–
2007	Céline Dion	I Knew I Loved You	–	–	–	–	–
2008	Tenniscoats/Tape	Come Maddalena	–	–	–	–	–
2010	Coolio	Change	–	–	–	–	–

All music composed by Ennio Morricone, lyrics written by various artists.

== Other song compositions ==
1961 – Faccio finta di dormire and Cicciona cha cha by Edoardo Vianello (lyrics by Carlo Rossi)
1962 – Quello che conta by Luigi Tenco (lyrics by Luciano Salce)
1963 – Pel di carota by Rita Pavone (lyrics by Franco Migliacci)
1963 – Nel corso by Gino Paoli (lyrics by Lina Wertmüller)
1963 – Ti ho conosciuto by Rita Pavone
1964 – Lonesome Billy by Peter Tevis
1964 – Domani prendo il primo treno by Paul Anka
1965 – L'amore gira by Rosy
1965 – Penso a te by Catherine Spaak
1965 – Le cose più importanti by Pierfilippi
1965 – Ho messo gli occhi su di te by Dino & Anna Moffo
1965 – Questi vent'anni miei by Catherine Spaak
1966 – Uccellacci e uccellini by Domenico Modugno
1967 – Vai via malinconia by Maysa Matarazzo
1968 – Scirocco by Renato Rascel
1968 – Canzone della libertà by Sergio Endrigo
1968 – Filastrocca vietnamita by Sergio Endrigo
1969 – Una breve stagione by Sergio Endrigo
1971 – Ho visto un film by Gianni Morandi
1989 – Libera l'amore by Zucchero

All songs composed by Ennio Morricone, lyrics written by various artists.

== Selected music certifications ==
Score/single/album	Sales	Certification date/info
A Fistful of Dollars (1964)	100,000 (F)); 1,500,000 (Italy)	Certification in 1981
The Good, the Bad and the Ugly (1966)	500,000 (RIAA); 3,000,000 (Worldwide)	14 August 1968
The Good, the Bad and the Ugly (song) (1968)	1,000,000 (Worldwide)	Hugo Montenegro version
Once Upon a Time in the West (1969)	800,000 (NL); 1,000,000 (F); 10 million (Worldwide)	Certification in 1992
La Cage aux Folles (1978)	500,000 (RIAA)	14 December 1995
Le Professionnel (1981)	902,900 (F); 3,000,000 (Worldwide)	certification in 2001
The Mission (1986)	500,000 (RIAA) (US); 50,000 (CDN); 100,000 (UK); 20,000 (Polen); 100,000 (F); 50,000 (ARG)	
Guardinas of the Clouds (2006)	30,000 (NL)	5 January 1981
Live at Arena – Verona (2006)	150,000 (I)	Live album
Voices of Silence (2007)	40,000 (I)	track dedicated to 9/11 attacks
We All Love Ennio Morricone (2007)	120,000 (I)	2008
