= Vittorio Duse =

Italian actor, screenwriter and film director

- Born: 21 March 1916; Loreto, Italy
- Died: 2 June 2005 (aged 89); Rome, Italy
- Other names: Victor Duncan; Victor Duse
- Occupation(s): Actor, film director, screenwriter
- Years active: 1941–2005

Vittorio Duse (21 March 1916 – 2 June 2005) was an Italian actor, screenwriter and film director.

== Biography ==
One of Duse's first roles was in Luchino Visconti's debut feature Ossessione (1942). Outside Italy, Duse is known for his role in The Godfather Part III as Don Tommasino in 1990, replacing Corrado Gaipa, who died one year prior to the film's release. Duse mostly starred in Italian films, although he also appeared in The Young Indiana Jones Chronicles, The Sopranos, and in When in Rome.

In 1989, Duse starred in the film Queen of Hearts, and he won the Jury Distinction Award at the Montréal World Film Festival.

== Death ==
Duse died on 2 June 2005 at the age of 89.

== Selected filmography ==
- Il cavaliere senza nome (1941)
- Girl of the Golden West (1942)
- Il leone di Damasco (1942)
- Giarabub (1942) – Un giocatore di carte
- Redenzione (1943)
- Il treno crociato (1943) – Sallustri (uncredited)
- Ossessione (1943) – L'agente di polizia
- I'll Always Love You (1943) – Il fidanzato di Clelia (uncredited)
- Two Anonymous Letters (1945) – Ettore
- The Sun Still Rises (1946) – Cesare
- Inquietudine (1946) – Pietro
- Tragic Hunt (1947) – Giuseppe
- Uomini senza domani (1948)
- Il cavaliere misterioso (1948)
- Guarany (1948)
- The Earth Cries Out (1949)
- La figlia della Madonna (1949)
- The Walls of Malapaga (1949) – L'agent / l'agente
- Return to Naples (1949) – Mario
- Notte di nebbia (1949)
- Le due madonne (1949)
- Altura (1949)
- Il sentiero dell'odio (1950)
- I'm the Capataz (1951) – Puchero
- Attention! Bandits! (1951) – Domenico
- Santa Lucia Luntana (1951)
- Salvate mia figlia (1951)
- Infame accusa (1952)
- Addio, figlio mio! (1953) – Il levantino, capo della banda
- Empty Eyes (1953) – Evasio, butler (uncredited)
- Frine, Courtesan of Orient (1953) – Ufficiale che trova la collana
- Terra straniera (1954)
- La peccatrice dell'isola (1954) – Ispettore de Santis
- Disonorata (senza colpa) (1954) – Sergio Vosulich
- Via Padova 46 (1954) – Policeman at the Airport (uncredited)
- Ultima illusione (1954)
- Il seduttore (1954) – Dante (uncredited)
- Disowned (1954) – Filippo
- Un giglio infranto (1956) – Il conte Zimmer
- A vent'anni è sempre festa (1957) – Piani
- The Loves of Salammbo (1960)
- A Man for Burning (1962) – Bastiano
- Odio mortale (1962) – Guercio
- A Girl... and a Million (1962) – Policeman at the studio (uncredited)
- Tempo di Roma (1962)
- The Leopard (1963)
- The Possessed (1965)
- Two Sergeants of General Custer (1965)
- I Knew Her Well (1965) – Guest at Paganelli's (uncredited)
- Requiescant (1967) – El Doblado
- Lo straniero (1967) – Lawyer
- Galileo (1968)
- Investigation of a Citizen Above Suspicion (1970) – Canes
- Lettera aperta a un giornale della sera (1970) – Butler
- Let's Have a Riot (1970) – Morelli
- The Syndicate: A Death in the Family (1970) – Mac Brown
- Corbari (1970) – Martino
- Un apprezzato professionista di sicuro avvenire (1971) – Father of Marco
- Alfredo, Alfredo (1972) – Giudice
- The Assassin of Rome (1972) – Director of 'Messaggero'
- Black Turin (1972) – Camarata
- Don Camillo e i giovani d'oggi (1972)
- Il caso Pisciotta (1972) – Il cappellano
- Amore e morte nel giardino degli dei (1972)
- Flatfoot (1973) – Police officer
- City Under Siege (1974) – Ragusa
- Il bacio di una morta (1974) – Cemetery caretaker
- Ready for Anything (1977) – The Butler
- I Am the Law (1977)
- Beast with a Gun (1977) – Caroli
- La bravata (1977)
- Queen of Hearts (1989) – Nonno
- The Godfather Part III (1990) – Don Tommasino
- Enchanted April (1991) – Domenico
- Il tempo del ritorno (1993)
- The Mysterious Enchanter (1996) – Father Medelana
- Ecco fatto (1998) – Man at laundrette
- Fate un bel sorriso (2000)
- When in Rome (2002) – Paolo's Grandfather (final film role)
