= Flavio Bucci =

Italian actor (1947–2020)

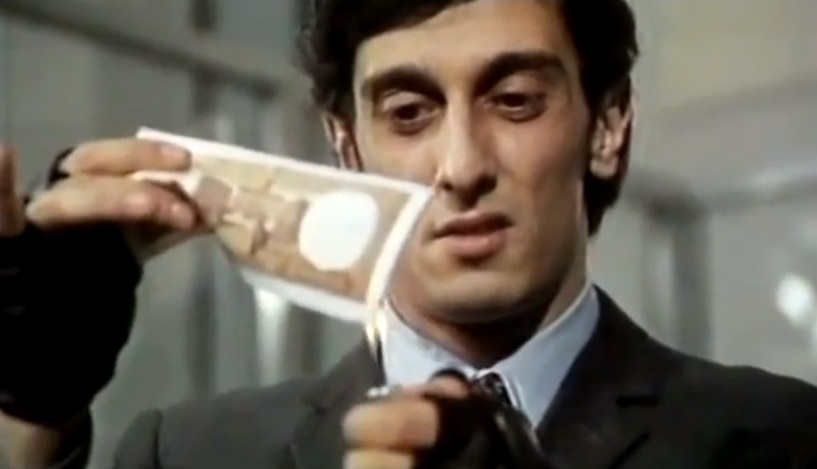
- Bucci in the movie Property Is No Longer a Theft (1973)
- Born: 25 May 1947; Turin, Italy
- Died: 18 February 2020 (aged 72); Fiumicino, Italy
- Occupations: Actor; voice actor; film producer
- Years active: 1971–2020
- Spouses: Micaela Pignatelli; Loes Kamsteeg
- Children: 3

Flavio Bucci (25 May 1947 – 18 February 2020) was an Italian actor, voice actor and film producer.

== Biography ==
Born in Turin, Bucci began appearing in film and television in 1971, making his debut appearance in the film The Working Class Goes to Heaven. He is known for playing Daniel, the blind pianist, in Dario Argento's Suspiria and for playing the thuggish Blackie in Aldo Lado's 1975 Night Train Murders. Another one of Bucci's iconic appearances was in the 1978 film Closed Circuit directed by Giuliano Montaldo, with whom he made several film collaborations with.

On stage, Bucci appeared in adaptations of Who's Afraid of Virginia Woolf?; The Clown and more. He also recited poems written by Giacomo Leopardi.

Bucci had a rare career as a voice dubber during the 1970s and 1980s. He dubbed John Travolta in his earlier films as well as Sylvester Stallone in The Lords of Flatbush. His character dubbing roles for television include Potsie Weber in the first two seasons of Happy Days and Luke Duke in the first five seasons of The Dukes of Hazzard.

=== Personal life ===
Bucci had two children from his marriage to actress Micaela Pignatelli, Alessandro and Lorenzo. He also had a son, Ruben from his second marriage to Dutch film producer Loes Kamsteeg.

On 18 February 2020, Bucci died of a heart attack in Fiumicino, at the age of 72.

== Filmography ==
=== Cinema ===
- The Working Class Goes to Heaven (1971) - Operaio
- Lover of the Great Bear (1971)
- Il generale dorme in piedi (1972) - Bucci (uncredited)
- Property Is No Longer a Theft (1973) - Total
- Last Stop on the Night Train (1975) - Blackie
- I giorni della chimera (1975)
- And Agnes Chose to Die (1976) - Il pugliese
- Strange Occasion (1976) - Réné Bernard - the director (segment "Italian superman")
- La Orca (1976) - Gino
- Suspiria (1977) - Daniel
- A Spiral of Mist (1977) - Vittorio Conte - The Doctor
- Dove volano i corvi d'argento (1977) - Simula
- Closed Circuit (1978, TV Movie) - Sociologist
- Gegè Bellavita (1978) - Gennarino Amato
- Ammazzare il tempo (1979) - Igor
- To Love the Damned (1980) - Riccardo 'Svitol'
- Men or Not Men (1980) - Enne 2
- The Homeless One (1981) - Il matlosa
- Il Marchese del Grillo (1981) - Fra' Bastiano
- The Magic Mountain (1982) - Ludovico Settembrini
- Dream of a Summer Night (1983) - Oberon
- The Incinerator (1984) - Hunchback
- The Two Lives of Mattia Pascal (1985) - Terenzio Papiano
- Tex and the Lord of the Deep (1985) - Kanas
- Woman of Wonders (1985) - Astolfo
- Il giorno prima (1987) - Herman Pundt
- Freckled Max and the Spooks (1987) - Mr. Talbot - the Werewolf
- Secondo Ponzio Pilato (1987) - Erode
- Com'è dura l'avventura (1987) - Padre Ribaldo
- Control (1987, TV Movie) - Pietro Brisani
- La posta in gioco (1988) - Gulli
- Anni 90 (1992) - Professor Moira ("Terapia di gruppo")
- Pierino Stecchino (1992)
- Amami (1993) - Piero Pagani
- Teste rasate (1993) - Riccardo
- Quando le montagne finiscono (1994) - Bepi Zomegnan
- Fratelli coltelli (1997) - Vannino
- My Dearest Friends (1998) - Botanico
- Frigidaire - Il film (1998) - Nat Krylov
- Lucignolo (1999) - Padre di Lucio
- Muzungu (1999) - Bishop
- Volesse il cielo! (2002) - Uomo Angelo
- Hotel Dajti (2002) - Andrea anziano
- Lettere al vento (2003)
- Caterina in the Big City (2003) - Lorenzo Rossi Chaillet
- Il silenzio dell'allodola (2005) - Direttore del carcere
- Flying Lessons (2007) - Leone, padre di Pollo
- La morte di pietra (2008) - Pierre
- Il Divo (2008) - Franco Evangelisti
- Fly Light (2009) - Barbone
- Border Line (2010)
- La scomparsa di Patò (2010) - Capitano Arturo Bosisio
- La grande rabbia (2016) - Virgilio, Padre Matteo
- Tutto può accadere nel villaggio dei miracoli (2016) - Armando Lucchi
- Il vangelo secondo Mattei (2016) - Franco Gravela
- Borghi e Demoni (2017) - Padre Superiore
- Agadah (2017) - Vecchio Moreno
- Il grande passo (2017) - Umberto Cavalieri
- Credo in un solo padre (2019) - Zio Domenico Bianco
- La Cornice (2019) - Il pittore

== Dubbing roles ==
=== Live action ===
- Danny Zuko in Grease
- Tony Manero in Saturday Night Fever
- Stanley Rosiello in The Lords of Flatbush
- Stuart Richards in Cruising
- Potsie Weber in Happy Days (seasons 1–2)
- Luke Duke in The Dukes of Hazzard (seasons 1–5)
