= Ghiglia =

Ghiglia is a surname. Notable people with the surname include:

- Benedetto Ghiglia (1921–2012), Italian composer, conductor, and pianist
- Oscar Ghiglia (1938–2024), Italian guitarist
