= Corrado Gaipa =

Italian actor (1925–1989)

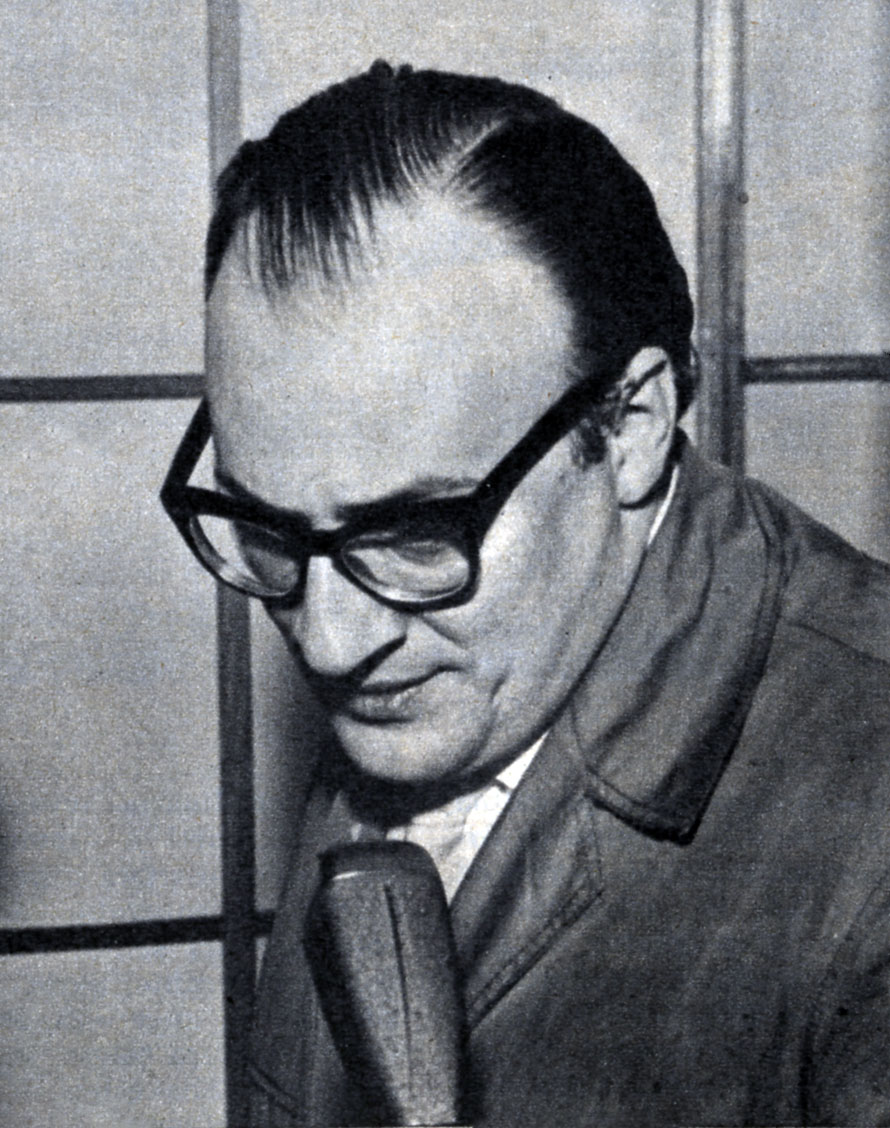
- Gaipa in 1959
- Born: 13 March 1925; Palermo, Italy
- Died: 21 September 1989 (aged 64); Rome, Italy
- Occupations: Actor; voice actor
- Years active: 1946–1989

Corrado Gaipa (13 March 1925 – 21 September 1989) was an Italian actor who specialized in films, television and dubbing.

A well known actor of Italian cinema, he was internationally known for his role as Don Tommasino in The Godfather, while his popularity in Italy was also connected to his activity as a voice dubber.

== Biography ==
Born in Palermo, Gaipa enrolled in the Silvio d'Amico Academy of Dramatic Arts, where he studied for three years and performed an adaptation of the play You Can't Take It with You. He then graduated in 1946. In 1948, Gaipa joined a theatre group based in Rome and began acting in radio dramas which were broadcast in many cities across Italy such as Turin, Florence and Milan. He also appeared in many films, beginning with That Splendid November (1969). He became well known worldwide playing Don Tommasino in the 1972 film The Godfather, directed by Francis Ford Coppola.

While also active on stage, radio and television, he was heavily active as a voice actor and especially as a dubber: he provided the Italian voice of Obi-Wan Kenobi (portrayed by Alec Guinness) in the Star Wars original trilogy as well as Bagheera in the Italian-Language version of The Jungle Book. He also dubbed over the voices of Lionel Stander, Eli Wallach, Peter Ustinov, Rod Steiger, Orson Welles, Burt Lancaster and Spencer Tracy. Gaipa assisted with the foundation of a dubbing company in the 1970s alongside Renato Turi, Giancarlo Giannini, Valeria Valeri, Oreste Lionello and other historical Italian dubbers.

== Illness and death ==
In Gaipa's later years, he developed serious health problems and went from using a walking stick to a wheelchair, ultimately dying in Rome on 21 September 1989, at the age of 64. At the time of his death, he had just signed to reprise the role of Don Tommasino in The Godfather Part III, which was instead passed on to Vittorio Duse.

== Filmography ==
=== Cinema ===
Year	Title	Role	Notes
1969	That Splendid November	Alfio	
1970	The Pizza Triangle	President of Tribunal	
1970	Metello	Badolati	Also dubbing Frank Wolff's role
1971	The Man with Icy Eyes	Isaac Thetman	
1971	The Fifth Cord	Andrea's Chief	
1972	Shadows Unseen	Günther Rosenthal	
1972	Execution Squad	Lawyer Armani	
1972	The Sicilian Connection	Don Calogero	
1972	Without Family	Judge	
1972	The Eroticist	Don Gesualdo	Also dubbing Lionel Stander's role
1972	The Godfather	Don Tommasino	Sicilian sequence
1972	My Dear Killer	Head of Insurance Company	
1972	The Pisciotta Case	Direttore del carcere	
1973	1931: Once Upon a Time in New York	Mob Boss	
1973	Giordano Bruno	Confessore di Giovanni Mocenigo	
1973	The Boss	Avvocato Rizzo	
1973	The Black Hand	Lawyer	
1973	Chino	Padre	
1973	I Kiss the Hand	Don Emilio Grisanti	
1973	Tony Arzenta	Tony Arzenta’s father	
1973	Secrets of a Call Girl	Doctor	
1974	The Sinful Nuns of Saint Valentine	Father Honorio de Mendoza	
1974	What Have They Done to Your Daughters?	Prosecutor	
1974	Prigione di donne	Magistrate	
1976	Illustrious Corpses	Supposed Mafioso	
1977	The Red Nights of the Gestapo	Udo Kassbaum	
1977	The Criminals Attack… The Police Respond!	Doctor	
1977	Crazy Desires of a Murderer	Inspector	
1977	A Spiral of Mist	Pietro San Germano	

=== Television ===
Year	Title	Role	Notes
1971	La rosa bianca	Kurt Huber	TV film
1971	Bernadette Devlin		TV film
1972	Le inchieste del commissario Maigret	Germain Cageot	1 episode
1973	Napoleone a Sant'Elena	Lord Liverpool	TV miniseries
1974	Ho incontrato un'ombra	Buache	TV miniseries
1975	Portrait of a Veiled Woman	Nebbia	TV miniseries
1975	Il marsigliese	Tanino Sciacca	TV miniseries
1975	L'invitto	Retana	TV film
1976	Dov'è Anna?	Loris	TV miniseries
1977	La mossa del cavallo	Il maestro	TV miniseries (Segment: "L'ultima notte")
1977	The Godfather: The Complete Novel for Television	Don Tommasino	TV miniseries
1978	Storie della camorra	Onorevole Colajanni	TV miniseries
1979	La dama dei veleni	Guido Santacroce	TV miniseries
1980	L'eredità della priora	Don Vincenzo	TV miniseries
1980	Sam & Sally	Dr. Jesse	1 episode
1982	Il fascino dell'insolito	L'uomo dei manichini	1 episode
1982	Marco Polo	Senator	1 episode

=== Documentaries ===
Year	Title	Notes
1984	Giuseppe Fava: Siciliano come me	

== Voice work ==
Year	Title	Role	Notes
1965	West and Soda	Additional voices	Animated film
1968	VIP my Brother Superman	Colonel	Animated film
1978	Jazz Band	Narrator	Uncredited
1983	Help Me Dream	Narrator	Uncredited
1983	A School Outing	Narrator	Uncredited
1988	Sposi	Narrator	Uncredited

=== Dubbing ===
==== Films (Animation, Italian dub) ====
Year	Title	Role(s)	Ref
1967	The Jungle Book	Bagheera	
1967	Asterix the Gaul	Abraracourcix	
1968	Asterix and Cleopatra	Obelix	
1968	Winnie the Pooh and the Blustery Day	Owl	
1970	The Aristocats	Scat Cat	

==== Films (Live action, Italian dub) ====
Year	Title	Role(s)	Original actor	Ref
1959	South Wind	Marquis Macri	Annibale Ninchi	
1960	Everybody Go Home	Quintino Fornaciari	Martin Balsam	
1963	The Leopard (Italian: Il Gattopardo)	Don Fabrizio Corbera	Burt Lancaster	
1963	The Eye of the Needle	Don Salvatore	Ernesto Calindri	
1966	Chimes at Midnight	John Falstaff	Orson Welles	
1967	Operation St. Peter's	Joe Ventura	Edward G. Robinson	
1967	Guess Who's Coming to Dinner	Matt Drayton	Spencer Tracy	
1967	In the Heat of the Night	Bill Gillespie	Rod Steiger	
1967	The Dirty Dozen	Archer J. Maggot	Telly Savalas	
1967	Attack on the Iron Coast	Frederick Grafton	Maurice Denham	
1968	The Shoes of the Fisherman	Cardinal Leone	Leo McKern	
1968	House of Cards	Charles Leschenhaut	Orson Welles	
1968	The Day of the Owl	Don Mariano Arena	Lee J. Cobb	
1968	Never a Dull Moment	Leo Joseph Smooth	Edward G. Robinson	
1968	Once Upon a Time in the West	Brett McBain	Frank Wolff	
1968	The Ruthless Four	Sam Cooper	Van Heflin	
1968	Krakatoa, East of Java	Harry Connerly	Brian Keith	
1968	Blackbeard's Ghost	Captain Blackbeard	Peter Ustinov	
1968	Hang 'Em High	Adam Fenton	Pat Hingle	
1968	The Lion in Winter	Captain William Marshall	Nigel Stock	
1968	2001: A Space Odyssey	Frank Poole's father	Alan Gifford	
1968	Will Penny	Alex	Ben Johnson	
1968	Chitty Chitty Bang Bang	Lord Scrumptious	James Robertson Justice	
1968	Rosemary's Baby	Roman Castevet	Sidney Blackmer	
1968	Pistol for a Hundred Coffins	J. Texas Corbett	Piero Lulli	
1968	May God Forgive You... But I Won't	Stuart	Luigi Pavese	
1969	Tepepa	Colonel Cascorro	Orson Welles	
1969	The Big Bounce	Sam Mirakian	Van Heflin	
1969	The Brain	Frankie Scannapieco	Eli Wallach	
1969	The Secret of Santa Vittoria	Italo Bombolini	Anthony Quinn	
1969	On Her Majesty's Secret Service	M	Bernard Lee	
1969	Battle of Britain	Sir David Kelly	Ralph Richardson	
1969	Fellini Satyricon	Trimalchio	Mario Romagnoli	
1969	Simón Bolívar	Mr. Hernandez	Julio Peña	
1970	Metello	Betto Lampredi	Frank Wolff	
1970	When Women Had Tails	Grr	Frank Wolff	
1970	The Kremlin Letter	Bresnavitch	Orson Welles	
1970	Between Miracles	Oreste Micheli	Lionel Stander	
1970	Too Late the Hero	Captain Hornsby	Denholm Elliott	
1970	La Horse	Auguste Maroilleur	Jean Gabin	
1970	The McMasters	McMasters	Burl Ives	
1970	Investigation of a Citizen Above Suspicion	Plumber	Salvo Randone	
1971	Ten Days' Wonder	Théo Van Horn	Orson Welles	
1971	Lawman	Vincent Bronson	Lee J. Cobb	
1971	Scandalous John	John McCanless	Brian Keith	
1971	A Clockwork Orange	Tramp	Paul Farrell	
1971	Bananas	Sanchez	David Ortiz	
1972	The Eroticist	Cardinal Maravidi	Lionel Stander	
1972	Don Camillo e i giovani d'oggi	Peppone	Lionel Stander	
1972	Treasure Island	Long John Silver	Orson Welles	
1972	Duck Soup	Ambassador Trentino of Sylvania (1972 dubbing)	Louis Calhern	
1972	Roma	Roman Eating in Terrace	Mimmo Poli	
1972	Roma	Music Hall Compere	Galliano Sbarra	
1972	Roma	Trattoria Waiter	Nino Terzo	
1972	Roma	Cinema Spectator with Family	Dante Cleri	
1973	The Exorcist	William F. Kinderman	Lee J. Cobb	
1973	The Man Who Loved Cat Dancing	Harvey Lapchance	Lee J. Cobb	
1973	Soylent Green	Solomon Roth	Edward G. Robinson	
1973	Scorpio	Sergei Zharkov	Paul Scofield	
1973	Ludwig	Father Hoffmann	Gert Fröbe	
1973	Amarcord	Aurelio Biondi	Armando Brancia	
1974	The Sensual Man	Baron Castorini	Lionel Stander	
1974	Innocence and Desire	Salvatore Niscemi	Lionel Stander	
1975	Russian Roulette	Commander Petapiece	Denholm Elliott	
1975	Barry Lyndon	Captain Grogan	Godfrey Quigley	
1975	The Hindenburg	Emilio Pajetta	Burgess Meredith	
1975	My Friends	Niccolò Righi	Bernard Blier	
1975	Deep Red	Rodi	Furio Meniconi	
1975	The Big Sleep	General Sternwood (1975 redub)	Charles Waldron	
1976	The Omen	Carl Bugenhagen	Leo McKern	
1976	The Inheritance	Gregorio Ferramonti	Anthony Quinn	
1976	Dog's Heart	Police Chief	Enzo Robutti	
1977	Star Wars: Episode IV – A New Hope	Obi-Wan Kenobi	Alec Guinness	
1977	The Greatest	Angelo Dundee	Ernest Borgnine	
1977	The Deep	Adam Coffin	Eli Wallach	
1977	Wifemistress	Head Doctor	Armando Brancia	
1977	Julia	Dashiell Hammett	Jason Robards	
1978	Damien - Omen II	Carl Bugenhagen	Leo McKern	
1978	Convoy	Lyle "Cottonmouth" Wallace	Ernest Borgnine	
1979	1941	Angelo Scioli	Lionel Stander	
1980	Star Wars: Episode V – The Empire Strikes Back	Obi-Wan Kenobi	Alec Guinness	
1980	Private Benjamin	Colonel Clay Thornbush	Robert Webber	
1981	Great White	Ron Hamer	Vic Morrow	
1983	Star Wars: Episode VI – Return of the Jedi	Obi-Wan Kenobi	Alec Guinness	
1983	Zeder	Professor Chesi	John Stacy	
1986	Ginger and Fred	Admiral Aulenti	Friedrich von Ledebur	
1987	Il mistero del panino assassino	Arno dei conti Vicini	Francisco Rabal	
1989	New York Stories	Psychiatrist	Marvin Chatinover	
