= The Haunting of Helena =

- Theatrical release poster and DVD cover
- Directed by: Christian Bisceglia
- Screenplay by: Christian Bisceglia
- Produced by: Manuela Cacciaman; Inti Carboni; Francesca Cingolani
- Starring: Harriet MacMasters-Green; Sabrina Jolie Perez; Jarreth J. Merz
- Cinematography: Antonello Emidi
- Edited by: Alessandro Palazzi
- Music by: Michele Josia
- Production company: One More Pictures
- Distributed by: RaiTrade
- Release dates: August 24, 2012 (Turkey); June 18, 2013 (United States)
- Running time: 84 minutes
- Country: Italy
- Language: English

The Haunting of Helena (also known as Fairytale in other countries) is a 2012 Italian supernatural horror film, written and directed by Christian Bisceglia and filmed in Italy. The film stars Harriet MacMasters-Green and Sabrina Jolie Perez.

The film was released as part of the Bloody Disgusting Selects line.

== Plot ==
Sophia is a recently divorced college professor who lives in Italy with her daughter Helena. The two of them are in a car accident on the same day that Helena loses her first tooth, and soon afterwards Helena begins to report strange visions to her mother. Investigating the history of the apartment in which they live, Sophia discovers that during the period of Fascist Italy, the man who lived there brutally tortured his wife by removing her teeth and locking her in a closet to die. Helena begins speaking to an invisible apparition in the closet, and later begins buying teeth from other children at school, saying that she needs to give them to the tooth fairy. A teacher from her school investigates this cruel and unusual behaviour, only to be attacked by a swarm of mosquitoes and killed. After ignoring a warning to leave the apartment from the elderly man who lives upstairs, they are attacked by the toothless ghost of the woman who died there. Sophia throws the teeth at her and they escape while she attempts to insert them into her mouth.

Eighteen months later, Helena has been institutionalized and is completely nonverbal. Her father has returned to Italy, and believes that Sophia is no longer capable of looking after her. While Helena is alone in her room, bloody teeth begin to rain from the ceiling, only to vanish moments later. The door to the closet in which the woman died begins to appear in other locations, and when Helena's father opens it he is consumed by a swarm of mosquitoes and killed. The doctors at the institution begin to question Sophia's fitness as a parent as her behaviour becomes increasingly erratic, and the pressure on her intensifies when her dead ex-husband's bloody teeth are found in Helena's locker. She begins to have visions of the murderer standing at the window of the abandoned psychiatric wing of the institution, and goes to investigate it.

Locating the murderer's file, Sophia is able to piece the evidence together and discover the hiding place of the dead woman's teeth. When the closet door appears to her again she throws them in, believing that it will satisfy the spirit. Helena immediately begins to speak again, and it appears that the haunting has come to an end. When she views a recorded interview with the murderer, however, she discovers that his wife was a serial killer who preyed upon children, eating the flesh from their faces, and he killed her in order to stop her from killing others. It is revealed that the elderly man who tried to warn Sophia witnessed her crimes as a child. Running through the institution, she comes across a patient whose face has been mauled, and he tells her that the ogre has her teeth once more. Reaching Helena's room, she walks in, then slowly backs out. She finally collapses and screams in horror.

Some time later, Sophia is a patient at the same institution. She is shown sitting on a bench, looking up at the abandoned psychiatric wing. Helena's ghost is now standing at the window along with the dead woman's husband, trapped in place with half of her face missing.

== Cast ==
- Harriet MacMasters-Green as Sophia
- Sabrina Jolie Perez as Helena
- Jarreth J. Merz as Robert
- Matt Patresi as Patrick
- Paolo Paoloni as Ferri
- Giuliano Montaldo as Dr. Fabiano
- Susanna Cornacchia as The Fairy
- Marco Fattibene as Battista Greco
- Lucrezia Tosi as Ghost Child
- Massimiliano Carnevale as Asylum Patient
- Angela Presepi as Miss Cavendish
- Marco Basile as Marco
- Melania Maccaferri as Nurse Manuela
- Alice Filippi as Nurse Alice
- Alessia Cannavale as Baby Sitter

== Reception ==
The Haunting of Helena has received primarily negative reviews, most of which have focused on the movie's clichéd plot line and the poor acting ability of both leads. Chuck Bowen of Slant described the film as being so close to the work of Guillermo del Toro that "he could almost reasonably consider filing a plagiarism suit against The Haunting of Helena's producers," while Bill Goodykoontz of The Arizona Republic stated that it "chugs along pretty well until the plot holes begin to pile up." Yell! Magazine gave The Haunting of Helena 2.5 stars, stating that it had a few redeeming qualities, especially the final twist, but that overall the film "had too many issues to fall in love with it."
