= The Reckless =

1965 Italian drama film

Una bella grinta
- Directed by: Giuliano Montaldo
- Written by: Lucio Battistrada; Armando Crispino; Giuliani G. De Negri; Giuliano Montaldo
- Produced by: Giuliani G. De Negri
- Starring: Renato Salvatori; Norma Bengell
- Cinematography: Erico Menczer
- Edited by: Attilio Vincioni
- Music by: Piero Umiliani
- Distributed by: Variety Distribution
- Release date: 18 February 1965
- Running time: 100 minutes
- Country: Italy
- Language: Italian

The Reckless (Italian: Una bella grinta) is a 1965 Italian drama film directed by Giuliano Montaldo. It was entered into the 15th Berlin International Film Festival.

== Cast ==
- Renato Salvatori ... Ettore Zambrini
- Norma Bengell ... Luciana, moglie di Ettore
- Antonio Segurini... Marco, amante di Luciana
- Marina Malfatti
- Dino Fontanesi
- Raffaele Triggia
- Claudine Auger
- Iginio Marchesini
- Gino Agostini
- Enrico Rame
