= The Entrepreneur =

- Directed by: Giuliano Montaldo
- Written by: Giuliano Montaldo; Andrea Purgatori
- Starring: Pierfrancesco Favino; Carolina Crescentini
- Cinematography: Arnaldo Catinari
- Music by: Andrea Morricone
- Release date: 2011
- Running time: 94 minutes
- Country: Italy

The Entrepreneur (Italian: L'industriale) is a 2011 Italian drama film directed by Giuliano Montaldo. The film premiered out of competition at the 2011 Rome Film Festival. It won three Italian Golden Globes for best film, cinematography and best music and the special jury prize to Pierfrancesco Favino. Additionally, it was also nominated to four Nastro d'Argento Awards (for best script, best actress, best cinematography and best scenography).

== Cast ==
- Pierfrancesco Favino: Nicola
- Carolina Crescentini: Laura
- Eduard Gabia : Gabriel
- Francesco Scianna: Ferrero
- Elena Di Cioccio: Marcella
- Andrea Tidona: Barbera

== See also ==
- List of Italian films of 2011
