= Outlaws of Love =

1963 film

- Directed by: Paolo and Vittorio Taviani; Valentino Orsini
- Edited by: Erico Menczer
- Music by: Giovanni Fusco
- Release date: 1963
- Country: Italy
- Language: Italian

I fuorilegge del matrimonio, internationally released as Outlaws of Love, is a 1963 Italian anthology comedy film. It is the second and last film directed both by Paolo and Vittorio Taviani and Valentino Orsini.

It is inspired by the draft law presented by the Socialist Senator Renato Luigi Sansone to the approval of the so-called "small divorce".

== Cast ==
- Ugo Tognazzi: Vasco Timballo
- Annie Girardot: Margherita
- Romolo Valli: Francesco
- Scilla Gabel: Wilma
- Marina Malfatti: Rosanna
- Enzo Robutti
- Gabriella Giorgelli
