= Closed Circuit (1978 film) =

1978 film

- Directed by: Giuliano Montaldo
- Screenplay by: Nicola Badalucco; Mario Gallo; Giuliano Montaldo
- Story by: Nicola Badalucco; Mario Gallo
- Produced by: Mario Gallo
- Starring: Flavio Bucci; Aurore Clément; Tony Kendall; Ettore Manni; Brizio Montinaro; Loris Bazzocchi; Giuliano Gemma; William Berger
- Cinematography: Giuseppe Pinori
- Edited by: Olga Pedrini
- Music by: Egisto Macchi
- Production company: Filmalpha
- Distributed by: RAI
- Release date: February 1978
- Running time: 88 minutes
- Country: Italy
- Language: Italian

Closed Circuit (Italian: Circuito chiuso) is a 1978 Italian made-for-television mystery film directed by Giuliano Montaldo. It was entered into the 28th Berlin International Film Festival.

The film concerns the police investigation of the murder of a cinema attendee who is shot dead during a matinée showing of a Spaghetti Western starring Giuliano Gemma.

== Plot ==
The film begins with various people attending a movie screening and the staff getting ready. Some audience members exhibit unusual behavior, such as the secret lovers in a back row or the man who uses the restroom for a suspiciously long time. There are men, women and children in the movie theater. A western is being shown. The movie is not age-restricted, as the lady at the box office explains to visitors.

During the screening, a man who had sat down next to a young couple is shot dead. The incident occurs at the end of the western, when two gunslingers fight a duel and shots are fired. It is unclear who shot the man in the movie theater.

A panic follows. The movie theater is quickly closed so that no one can leave. The police arrive; the inspector is assured that the murderer and the murder weapon must still be in the movie theater.

The inspector interrogates the individual visitors. He can understand the suspicious behavior of some of them: For example, he learns that the two lovers are married to other people and have been meeting secretly in the movie theater. Two crooks who want to leave the movie theater in secret are caught. But the inspector can't prove anything about them either.

The detective learns that the victim was a single pensioner who was fascinated by cinema and photography. This does not lead him any further either.

The inspector has the incident reconstructed. To do this, the visitors have to sit on the same chairs as when they first saw the western. In this reconstruction, a popular usher from the movie theater sits in the seat of the murdered man, and is also mysteriously shot at the end of the western.

Finally, the Ministry of Defense gets involved, as the murdered man had worked there, albeit only as an accountant. Time is of the essence, because the visitors trapped in the movie theater want to go home.

Another reconstruction takes place, this time with one of the commissioner's superiors sitting in the seat in question. Before the gunshot in the film takes place, he stands up and runs through the movie theater, filled with fear, because the gunslinger on the screen is looking directly at him and aiming his revolver at him. In the end, the movie gunslinger shoots this victim too.

The movie cannot be switched off, and after the third victim is shot, the physical film disappears from the projector. The police experts have, in the meanwhile, discovered what kind of firearm was used to shoot the previous victims: a Colt from 1863.

The case remains officially unsolved. At the end of the movie, the inspector and one of the visitors, a sociologist, have a philosophical conversation. In it, the sociologist quotes from science fiction novels and points out that people kill each other with the machines they create. Moreover, according to the sociologist, images are more powerful than reality.

== Cast ==
- Flavio Bucci - Il sociologo
- Tony Kendall - Roberto Vinci
- Aurore Clément - Gabriella
- William Berger - Il pistolero sfidante
- Giuliano Gemma - Il pistolero
- Luciano Catenacci - Vice-questore
- Giovanni Di Benedetto - Nonno
- Mattia Sbragia - L'adolescente
- Franco Balducci - Aldo Capocci
- Guerrino Crivello - Piccoletto
- Alfredo Pea - Garzone
- Laura D'Angelo - La maschera al cinema

== Production ==
In an interview conducted before his death in 2023, director Giuliano Montaldo cited that the Ray Bradbury short story The Veldt was a direct inspiration on the screenplay, though it was not ultimately an official adaptation. In the film's conclusion, while not named, Bradbury is name-checked and the story and its denouement are discussed by the detective and the sociologist.

Though never directly mentioned or named within the movie, the western scenes on the screen were taken from Giulio Petroni's 1968 film A Sky Full of Stars for a Roof, which starred William Berger and Giuliano Gemma. Gemma recreated his character's appearance in new footage shot by Montaldo to make his film gunslinger sentient and aware of the audience.

Shown only on Italian television initially, it received a U.S. Blu-ray release from Severin Films in 2023.
