= Lover of the Great Bear =

- Directed by: Valentino Orsini
- Written by: Valentino Orsini; Mino Roli; Florestano Vancini
- Starring: Giuliano Gemma; Senta Berger
- Cinematography: Mario Vulpiani
- Edited by: Heide-Maria Haschke; Roberto Perpignani
- Music by: Benedetto Ghiglia
- Release date: 1971
- Language: Italian

Lover of the Great Bear (Italian: L'amante dell'Orsa Maggiore, French: La ligne de feu, German: Nur der letzte kam durch, also known as The Smugglers) is a 1971 Italian-French-West German drama film directed by Valentino Orsini and starring Giuliano Gemma and Senta Berger. It is loosely based on the Polish novel Kochanek Wielkiej Niedźwiedzicy by Sergiusz Piasecki.

== Cast ==
- Giuliano Gemma as Vladek
- Senta Berger as Fela
- Bruno Cremer as Saska
- Francesca Romana Coluzzi as Berna
- Spiros Focás as Alfred
- Nicoletta Machiavelli as Leonia
- Flavio Bucci
- Peter Capell
- Alessandro Haber as Topo
- Antonio Piovanelli as Ivan
- Sybil Danning
- Nazzareno Zamperla as Smuggler (uncredited)
