= Tzavalas Karousos =

Greek actor

Tzavalas Karousos Τζαβαλάς Καρούσος
- Born: 8 September 1904; Lefkada, Greece
- Died: 3 January 1969 (aged 64); Paris, France
- Occupation: Stage actor

Tzavalas Karousos (Greek: Τζαβαλάς Καρούσος; 8 September 1904 – 3 January 1969) was a Greek actor.

== Career ==
He was born in Lefkada and first acted in the theatre participating in the Veakis-Nezer (Nesser) theatrical company. With theatrical studies in France and other European countries, he played at the National Theatre during the golden period of Fotos Politis. After the war he took part at the theatrical company and with the Greek Folklore Theatre with Manos Katrakis.

He first acted in the National Theatre and succeeded Aimilios Veakis. He switched to the modern Greek work and first starred in many Greek movies (I zavoliara, Orgi, Antigone, Anthropos yia oles tis doulies, Faidra, etc.) The role which made him famous was Shylock in The Merchant of Venice by Shakespeare. He later finished his acting career due to the dictatorship. He last appeared at the Piraeus Public Theatre. He left for Paris, where he remained until his death at age 64 in 1969.

== Filmography ==
Year	Film	Transliteration and translation	Role
1933	Despinis dikigoros	Δεσποινίς δικηγόρος (Lady Judge)	-
1943	I foni tis kardias	Η φωνή της καρδιάς (Voice of the Heart)	-
1954	To koritsi tis yitonias	Το κορίτσι της γειτονιάς (Girl From The Neighbourhood)	Petros
1959	I zavoliara	Η ζαβολιάρα	Konstantis
1959	Sarakatsanissa	Σαρακατσάνισσα	-
1959	Navagia tis zois	Ναυάγια της ζωής	-
1959	Matomeno iliovasilemma	Bloody Twilight	
1961	Irthes arga	Ήρθες αργά (You Came Late)	Petros
1961	Epikindini apostoli	Επικίνδυνη αποστολή	Captain Mihalis
1961	Antigone	Αντιγόνη (Antigoni or Andigoni)	Tiresias
1962	Orgy	Οργή (Oryi)	-
1962	Phaedra	Φαίδρα (Fedra or Faidra)	-
1062	Otan i mira kiverna	Όταν (When My Fate Governs)	-
1963	Tereza	Τερέζα	-
1963	Kourastika na s'apoktiso	Κουράστηκα να σ' αποκτήσω (I Am Tired To Acquisit)	-
1964	Rigameno spiti	Ρημαγμένο σπίτι (Shooken House)	-
1964	Ta dakria mou ine kafta	Τα δάκρυά μου είναι καυτά	-
1965	Vana	Βάνα	-
1965	Me idrota ke dakria	Με ιδρώτα και δάκρυα (With Sweat And Tears)	-
1965	To lathos	Το λάθος (Wrong)	-
1965	Ta dihtya tis dropis	Τα δίχτυα της ντροπής	Vrassidas
1965	Afiste me na ziso	Αφήστε με να ζήσω (Leave Me Alone To Live)	Georgios Vranas
1966	I parastratimeni	Η παραστρατημένη	-
1966	Anthropos yia oles tis doulies	Άνθρωπος για όλες τις δουλειές (A Person For All These Works)	Captain Manolis
1967	I voskoi	Οι βοσκοί	Vlahopoulos
1967	Kolonaki diagogi miden	Κολωνάκι: διαγωγή μηδέν	Stefanos Kotsomitros
