= Christian Bisceglia =

Italian film director

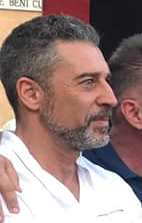
- Christian Bisceglia in 2019
- Born: 18 November 1967 (age 58); Paderno Dugnano, Italy
- Occupations: Film director, screenwriter
- Years active: 2001-present

Christian Bisceglia (born 18 November 1967) is an Italian film director and screenwriter. He was born in a small town near Milan, but he is Messinese of adoption.

== Biography ==
In 2019, he shoots in English, directed in collaboration with the director Ascanio Malgarini, the film Cruel Peter, a horror film set in his Messina. The film premiered at the Ancient theatre of Taormina on the occasion of the annual Taormina Film Fest. The director, is ever more active in the United States, and the movie will be released in US cinemas (and on demand) in 2020, distributed by Vertical Entertainment.

== Selected filmography ==
- Agente matrimoniale (2006)
- The Haunting of Helena (2012)
- Cruel Peter (2019)
