= Corbari =

- Directed by: Valentino Orsini
- Cinematography: Sebastiano Celeste
- Edited by: Roberto Perpignani
- Music by: Benedetto Ghiglia
- Release date: 1970
- Country: Italy
- Language: Italian

Corbari (also known as Mission Corbari) is a 1970 Italian war-drama film written and directed by Valentino Orsini. It is based on real life events of Italian partisan Silvio Corbari.

== Cast ==
- Giuliano Gemma as Silvio Corbari
- Tina Aumont as Ines
- Antonio Piovanelli as Adriano Casadei
- Frank Wolff as Ulianov
- Daniele Dublino as Lt. Alfredo Conti
- Spiros Focas as Orlandi
- Renato Romano as Fascist commander
- Bill Vanders as Ricciardi
- Alessandro Haber as Michele
- Adolfo Lastretti as Corriere della Notte editor
- Vittorio Duse as Martino
