= Attention! Bandits! =

Achtung! Banditi!
- Film poster
- Directed by: Carlo Lizzani
- Written by: Giuseppe Dagnino
- Produced by: Giorgio Agliani
- Starring: Gina Lollobrigida; Andrea Cecchi; Vittorio Duse; Lamberto Maggiorani; Giuseppe Taffarel; Maria Laura Rocca; Franco Bologna; Pietro Tordi
- Cinematography: Gianni Di Venanzo
- Edited by: Enzo Alfonzi
- Music by: Mario Zafred
- Distributed by: Cooperativa Spettatori Produttori Cinematogr
- Release date: 10 November 1951
- Running time: 90 minutes
- Country: Italy
- Language: Italian

Achtung! Banditi! also known as Attention! Bandits! is a 1951 Italian war film directed by Carlo Lizzani and starring Gina Lollobrigida and Andrea Checchi.

== Cast ==
- Gina Lollobrigida as Anna
- Andrea Checchi as the engineer
- Lamberto Maggiorani as Marco
- Giuseppe Taffarel as Commander Vento
- Vittorio Duse as Domenico
- Giuliano Montaldo as Lorenzo
- Franco Bologna as Gatto
- Maria Laura Rocca as the diplomat's lover
- Pietro Tordi as the diplomat
- Ferdinando Cost as a German official
- Bruno Berellini as a blond man
- Pietro Ferro as a partisan
- Lucia Feltrin as the courier
- Giuseppe Mantero as Pietro
- Domenico Grassi as a German soldier
