= My Dearest Son =

- Directed by: Valentino Orsini
- Written by: Vincenzo Cerami; Giuliani G. De Negri; Valentino Orsini
- Story by: Furio Scarpelli; Valentino Orsini
- Starring: Ben Gazzara; Sergio Rubini; Valeria Golino; Mariangela Melato
- Cinematography: Luigi Kuveiller
- Edited by: Roberto Perpignani
- Music by: Guido & Maurizio De Angelis
- Release date: 1985
- Country: Italy
- Language: Italian

My Dearest Son (Italian: Figlio mio infinitamente caro) is a 1985 Italian drama film. It represents the last film written and directed by Valentino Orsini. It is also the film debut of Italian actor Sergio Rubini.

== Cast ==
- Ben Gazzara as Avv. Antonio Morelli
- Sergio Rubini as Marco Morelli
- Valeria Golino as Francesca
- Mariangela Melato as Stefania
