= Spiros Focás =

Greek actor (1937–2023)

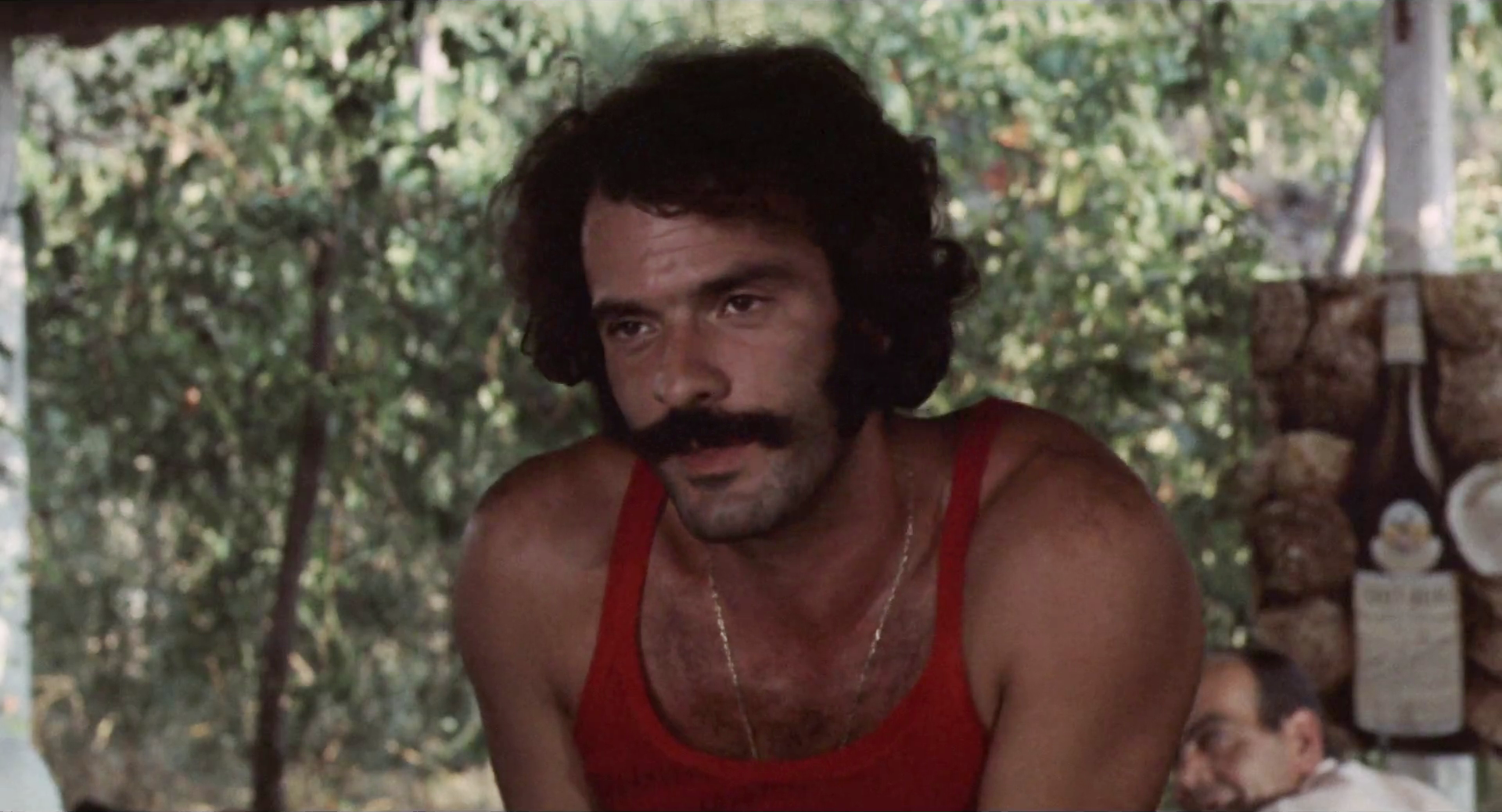
- Focás in Basta guardarla, 1970
- Born: Spyridon Androutsopoulos; 17 August 1937; Patras, Greece
- Died: 10 November 2023 (aged 86); Eleusis, Greece
- Occupation: Actor
- Years active: 1959–2019
- Spouse: Lilian Panagiotopoulou (m. 2013)

Spiros Focás (Greek: Σπύρος Φωκάς; 17 August 1937 – 10 November 2023) was a Greek actor.

== Life and career ==
Spyros Fokas was born Spyridon Androutsopoulos in Patras on 17 August 1937.

Focás made his first appearance in 1959. He first appeared in Andreas Lambrino's film Bloody Twilight in 1959. The film was screened at the 1959 Cannes Film Festival and was the starting point for his international career.

After this distinction, being also a graduate of Kostis Michalidis drama school, Spyros Focás did not take long to take the risk and go to Italy, to the studios of Cinecittà, where he took advantage of the auditions and the opportunities presented to him. Thus, he participated in international productions, such as in the films A Matter of Time by Vincente Minnelli and Rocco and His Brothers by Luchino Visconti, alongside Katina Paxinou.

Throughout his film career, he successfully acted in over 30 films, most of them in Italy and United States, and it is worth mentioning that he became particularly well-known and loved, also from his appearances in well-known theatres abroad. His presence on Greek television was also an important end, starring in many drama series.

=== Personal life and death ===
Focás had four marriages. While he had no biological children, he was the stepfather of the daughter of his fourth wife, Lillian, to whom he had been married since 2013.

Spiros Focás died in a rehabilitation center in Eleusis, where he had been receiving treatment since the previous summer, on 10 November 2023. He was 86. His remains were cremated on 14 November.

== Selected filmography ==
(*asterisk indicates starring role)

- Bloody Twilight (1959) - Giannos*
- Lygos, o leventis (1959) - Tasos Lygos
- Diakopes stin Kolopetinitsa (1959) - Alekos
- Death of a Friend (1959) - Bruno*
- Messalina (1960) - Lucio Massimo*
- Rocco and His Brothers (1960) - Vincenzo Parondi
- Apolytrosis (1961) - Ilias
- Psycosissimo (1961) - Pietro, l'autista
- Run with the Devil (1960) - Marco Belli
- Eighteen in the Sun (1962) - Johnny
- A Man for Burning (1962) - Jachino*
- Anima nera (1962)
- Egoismos (1964) - Kostas
- A Bullet Through the Heart (1966) - Navarra
- The Fear (1966) - Nikos*
- I Stefania (1966) - Giorgos Daponte
- Queen of Clubs (1966) - Alexandros*
- Ta skalopatia (1966)
- Erotas stin kafti ammo (1966) - Stefos Pergamos
- Psomi gia ena drapeti (1967) - Giovanni
- Hate Thy Neighbor (1968) - (as "Clyde Garner") Ken Dakota
- I zoi enos anthropou (1968) - Hristos Sgouros
- Ekeinoi pou xeroun n' agapoun (1968) - Petros
- Brosta stin aghoni (1968) - Timos
- Zorro in the Court of England (1969) - Pedro Suarez / Zorro*
- Corbari (1970)
- Basta guardarla (1970) - Fernando
- Lover of the Great Bear (1971) - Alfred*
- Lui per lei (1972)
- I Kiss the Hand (1973) - Luca Ferrante
- Shaft in Africa (1973) - Sassari
- Flavia the Heretic (1974) - the French Duke
- Mark Shoots First (1975) - Morini
- Ta paidia touy zevedaiou (1975)
- A Matter of Time (1976) - (uncredited)
- Holocaust 2000 (1977) - Harbin
- I anametrisi (1979)
- H stigmh ths alitheias (1979)
- Diamantia (1979)
- Sonia (1980) - Tonio
- Souvliste tous! Etsi tha paroume to kouradokastro (1981) - Iasonas
- To mithistorima ton tessaron (1981)
- Ta diamantia den lene psemmata (1981)
- Oi tyhodiohtes (1981) - Petros Georgiou
- Anametrisi (1982) - Petros Parisis
- I parexigisi (1983) - Nikos
- The Jewel of the Nile (1985) - Omar
- Fout Bol (1985)
- Black Tunnel (1986) - Colonel Jack Roth
- Rambo III (1988) - Masoud
- Tre colonne in cronaca (1990) - Anthony Bassouri - il socio di Leporino
- White Palace (1990) - George (uncredited)
- The Serpent of Death (1990) - Stavros
- To pethameno liker (1992) - Triandafillos
- O drapetis tou feggariou (1994)
- Sapounopetra: To hrima sto Laimo sas (1995)
- Karagioz Dream (1996)
- Biznes sta Valkania (1997)
- Ntaiana i prigipissa tou laou (1999)
- Vitsia gynaikon (2000) - Marios Venieris
- Alexandros kai Aishe (2002)
- Sti skia tou Lemmy Caution (2002)
- L'ospite segreto (2003) - Uncle
- O haros vgike pagania (2003)
- Min pernas, anavei kokkino (2003)
- Parta ola (2003)
- 448 BC: Olympiad of Ancient Hellas (2004) - Empedocles
- A Simple Love Story (2007)
- I diathiki tou ierea Ioanni Meslier (2009)
- Bring them back (2010)
- Promakhos (2014) - Fotis
- Vakxes (2015)
- Raw Trip (2016) - Sheriff
- O Thisavros (2017)
- Outlanders 2018 (2018)
