= Bloody Twilight =

1959 film

- Directed by: Andreas Labrinos
- Written by: Andreas Labrinos
- Produced by: Andreas Labrinos
- Starring: Efi Oikonomou
- Cinematography: Kostas Filippou
- Edited by: Kostas Filippou; Andreas Labrinos
- Music by: Kostas Kapnisis
- Release date: 1959
- Running time: 88 minutes
- Country: Greece
- Language: Greek

Bloody Twilight (Greek: Matomeno iliovasilemma) is a 1959 Greek drama film directed by Andreas Labrinos. It was entered into the 1959 Cannes Film Festival.

== Cast ==
- Efi Oikonomou as Dina Wistavsen
- Spiros Focás as Giannos
- Tzavalas Karousos
- Andreas Zisimatos
- Mihalis Kalogiannis
- Kakia Analyti as Hryso
- Kostas Rigopoulos
