= Control (1987 film) =

Il giorno prima
- Directed by: Giuliano Montaldo
- Screenplay by: Piero Angela; Jeremy Hole; Giuliano Montaldo; Brian Moore
- Story by: Piero Angela
- Produced by: Franco Cristaldi
- Starring: Zeudi Araya; Ben Gazzara; Erland Josephson; Kate Nelligan; Burt Lancaster; Flavio Bucci; Andrea Occhipinti; Ingrid Thulin
- Cinematography: Armando Nannuzzi
- Edited by: Ruggero Mastroianni
- Music by: Ennio Morricone
- Production companies: HBO Showcase; Les Films Ariane; Selena Audiovisuel; Cristaldi Film; Alliance Films; RAI
- Distributed by: Columbia Pictures (Italy); Acteurs Auteurs Associés (France); Alliance Films (Canada); HBO (United States)
- Release dates: February 14, 1987 (U.S.); April 3, 1987 (Italy)
- Running time: 107 minutes
- Countries: Italy; France; Canada; United States
- Language: English

Il giorno prima (internationally released as Control and Mind Control) is a 1987 Italian thriller film directed by Giuliano Montaldo and starring Burt Lancaster and Ben Gazzara. The story was written by Piero Angela and the screenplay was by Piero Angela, Jeremy Hole, Giuliano Montaldo and Brian Moore.

== Plot ==
This story takes place during an experiment concerning the psychological effects of mental fatigue on those locked in a fallout shelter for a long period of time. Twelve subjects are locked in a nuclear fallout shelter to see how long they can endure before mental breakdown occurs. After the experiment Dr. Herbert Monroe (Burt Lancaster) tells the world about this terrifying experiment and its outcome.

== Cast ==
Actor	Role
Burt Lancaster	Dr. Herbert Monroe
Ben Gazzara	Mike Zella
Kate Nelligan	Sarah Howell
Ingrid Thulin	Mrs. Havemeyer
Erland Josephson	Swanson
Flavio Bucci	Herman Pundt
Herman Pundt	Max Bloch
Andréa Ferréol	Rosy Bloch
Cyrielle Clair	Laura Swanson
William Berger	Mr. Peterson
Jean Benguigui	Max Bloch
Zeudi Araya	Sheba
Andrea Occhipinti	Matteo
Alfredo Pea	Dr. Paul Benoit

== Sources ==
- The Motion Picture Guide 1988 Annual: The Films of 1987
