= Giordano Bruno (film) =

- Directed by: Giuliano Montaldo
- Starring: Gian Maria Volonté; Charlotte Rampling
- Cinematography: Vittorio Storaro
- Edited by: Antonio Siciliano
- Music by: Ennio Morricone
- Release date: October 29, 1973
- Country: Italy
- Language: Italian

Giordano Bruno is a 1973 Italian biographical drama film directed by Giuliano Montaldo. It was produced by Carlo Ponti.

The film, which does not shy from presenting libidinous aspects of his behaviour, chronicles the last years of life of the philosopher Giordano Bruno (1548-1600), from the year 1592, when his ideas drew the attention of guardians of Roman Catholic doctrines, to his execution in 1600.

== Cast ==
- Gian Maria Volonté: Giordano Bruno
- Charlotte Rampling: Fosca
- Renato Scarpa: Fra' Tragagliolo
- Mathieu Carrière: Orsini
- Hans Christian Blech: Sartori
- Giuseppe Maffioli: Arsenalotto
- Mark Burns: Bellarmino
- Massimo Foschi: Fra Celestino
- Paolo Bonacelli
- José Quaglio
- Corrado Gaipa
