= And Agnes Chose to Die =

- Directed by: Giuliano Montaldo
- Written by: Nicola Badalucco; Giuliano Montaldo
- Starring: Ingrid Thulin; Stefano Satta Flores; Michele Placido; Aurore Clément; Ninetto Davoli; Eleonora Giorgi; Massimo Girotti
- Edited by: Franco Fraticelli
- Music by: Ennio Morricone
- Release date: 1976
- Language: Italian

L'Agnese va a morire, internationally released as And Agnes Chose to Die, is a 1976 Italian drama film directed by Giuliano Montaldo. It is based on a novel of the same name by Renata Viganò which won the Viareggio Prize in 1949.

== Plot ==
Agnese is a middle-aged woman from Comacchio who lives with her husband Palita, a member of the Italian Resistance. One day, her husband is deported to a concentration camp, where he will die; due to her loss she wants to help her companions by bringing food, information, weapons and news from one country to another. She therefore becomes a partisan relay: her life continues like this for six months but one day a German soldier kills her black cat for fun and that same night Agnese hits him by breaking his head with the butt of a machine gun and leaving him for dead. Agnese must escape and, consequently, become part of the clandestine life of the Resistance, becoming "mother Agnese": she prepares meals for partisans, checks that there are supplies for everyone, carries out housework, so as not to be noticed by the Germans. When, in the last harsh winter, a group of partisans are betrayed and exterminated by Germans stationed along the route that should take them beyond the lines, Agnese disobeys her commander by hiding the survivors in the house. The partisans are not well seen by the people and underestimated even by the Allies and, after the defeat of the partisan battle, Agnese returns to operate as a courier but, during a roundup, she is recognized by the soldier's officer who she thought she had killed and that instead she had only wounded and she is killed by him.

== Cast ==
- Ingrid Thulin: Agnese
- Stefano Satta Flores: il comandante
- Michele Placido: Tom
- Aurore Clément: Rina
- Ninetto Davoli: La disperata
- William Berger: Clinto
- Flavio Bucci: il pugliese
- Rosalino Cellamare: Zero
- Alfredo Pea: Tonitti
- Roger Worrod: British Officer
- Gino Santercole: Piròn
- Eleonora Giorgi: Vandina
- Johnny Dorelli: Walter
- Massimo Girotti: Palita
- Dina Sassoli: Minghina
- Gabriella Giorgelli: Lorenza
- Ornella Muti

== See also ==
- List of Italian films of 1976
