= Men or Not Men =

- Directed by: Valentino Orsini
- Written by: Valentino Orsini, Faliero Rosati, Giuliani G. De Negri
- Cinematography: Franco Di Giacomo
- Music by: Ennio Morricone
- Release date: 1980
- Country: Italy
- Language: Italian

Men or Not Men (Italian: Uomini e no) is a 1980 Italian war-drama film directed by Valentino Orsini. It is based on the novel with the same name by Elio Vittorini.

== Cast ==
- Flavio Bucci as Enne 2
- Monica Guerritore as Berta
- Ivana Monti as Lorena
- Massimo Foschi as El Paso
- Renato Scarpa as Cane Nero
- Francesco Salvi
- Michele Soavi
