= Andrea Morricone =

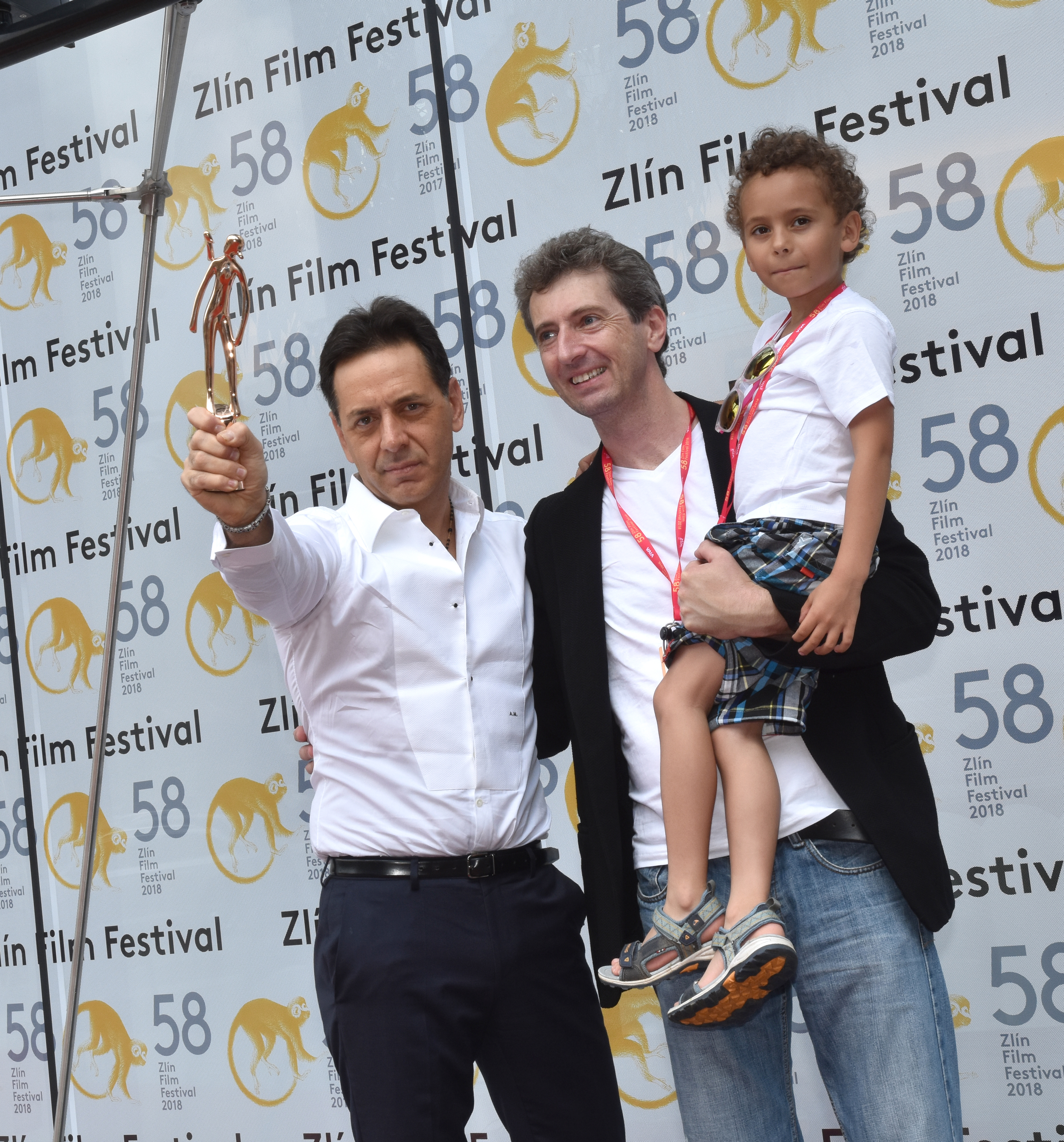
- Morricone (left) at the Zlín Film Festival premiere of 72 Hours in Bangkok in 2018

Background information
- Born: 10 October 1964 (age 61)
- Origin: Rome, Italy
- Occupations: Composer; arranger; conductor
- Years active: 1992–present

Andrea Morricone (Italian: [morriˈkoːne]; born 10 October 1964) is an Italian composer and conductor, known for his film scores. He is the third child, and second son, of late composer and Academy Award winner Ennio Morricone. He composed the film scores for the American films Capturing the Friedmans and Liberty Heights. He collaborated with his father on the score for Cinema Paradiso, for which they won a BAFTA Award for For Best Original Film Music. The Love Theme from Cinema Paradiso is a work by Andrea Morricone. He has also composed music for many other Italian films, including The Inquiry and The Entrepreneur. On 29 May 2018, Andrea Morricone received the "Golden Slipper" award at the 58th Zlín Film Festival, during the premiere of 72 Hours in Bangkok, in recognition of his contribution to world cinematography.
