= A Man for Burning =

1962 film

A Man for Burning Un uomo da bruciare
- Directed by: Paolo and Vittorio Taviani; Valentino Orsini
- Cinematography: Antonio Secchi
- Music by: Gianfranco Intra
- Release date: 1962
- Country: Italy
- Language: Italian

Un uomo da bruciare (internationally released as A Man for Burning) is a 1962 Italian drama film. It is the first feature film directed by Valentino Orsini and Paolo and Vittorio Taviani.

It entered the 1962 Venice Film Festival, in which it won the Italian Film Critics Award.

It is based on the life of the Sicilian union organizer Salvatore Carnevale.

== Cast ==
- Gian Maria Volonté: Salvatore
- Didi Perego: Barbara
- Spiros Focás: Jachino
- Turi Ferro: Don Vincenzo
- Marina Malfatti: Wilma
- Marcella Rovena
