= Valentino Orsini =

Italian film director

Valentino Orsini (19 January 1927 in Pisa – 26 January 2001 in Cerveteri) was an Italian film director.

After his first interests to arts (he had been sculptor, stage designer, cinema critic, cineclub animator) in his hometown, in 1954 Valentino Orsini directed with the brothers Paolo and Vittorio Taviani (born in the near small city of San Miniato) the documentary San Miniato: luglio 1944. After other documentaries, most with Taviani brothers, he realized his first fiction films in 1962 and in 1963, both with the two brothers. After other documentaries Orsini directed his first fiction film alone, I dannati della terra in 1969. Despite his few fiction films (but he realized a lot of documentaries all around the world) Orsini is highly considered for his role in renewing Italian cinema in 1960s and 1970s, facing subjects such as the peasants' fights in Sicily, the divorce, the underdeveloped countries. In his last films his civil commitment was less present. For several years, he was the main Film directing teacher at the National Film School, Centro Sperimentale di Cinematografia in Rome, Italy. Among his students: Gabriele Muccino, Francesca Archibugi, Fausto Brizzi, Salvatore Mereu, Giuseppe Petitto, Paolo Franchi.

== Filmography ==
- A Man for Burning (Italy, 1962): in collaboration with Paolo and Vittorio Taviani
- I fuorilegge del matrimonio (Italy, 1963): in collaboration with Paolo and Vittorio Taviani
- I dannati della terra (Italy, 1969)
- Corbari (Italy, 1970)
- Lover of the Great Bear (Italy/France/West Germany, 1971)
- Men or Not Men (Italy, 1980)
- My Dearest Son (Italy, 1985)
