= Benedetto Ghiglia =

Italian composer, conductor and pianist

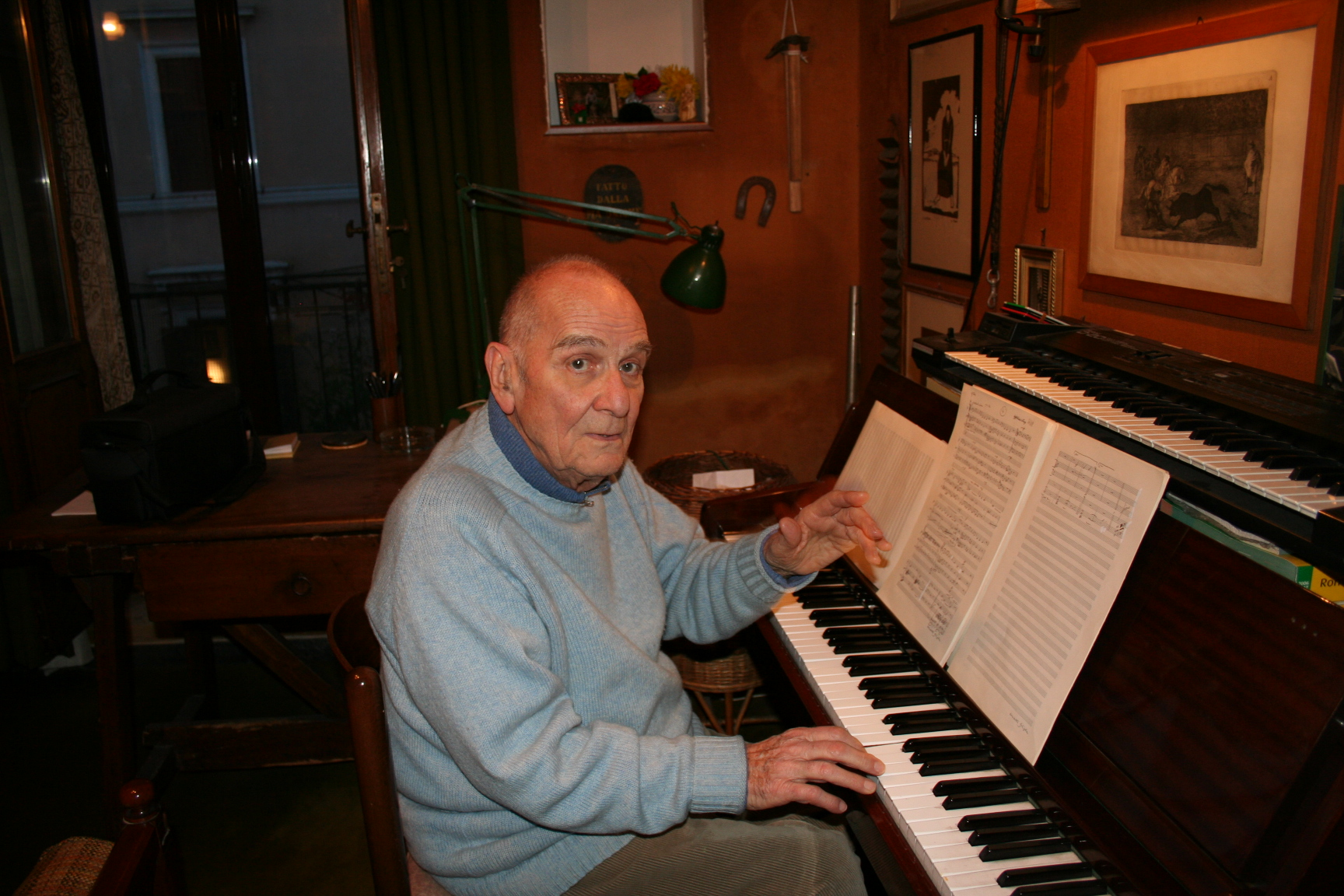
- Benedetto Ghiglia (2008)
- Born: 27 December 1921; Fiesole, Florence, Italy
- Died: 4 July 2012 (aged 90); Rome, Italy

Benedetto Ghiglia (27 December 1921 – 4 July 2012) was an Italian composer, conductor and pianist.

== Life and career ==
Born in Fiesole, Ghiglia graduated in composition and piano from the Florence Conservatory. He then started an activity as a chamber musician, both as solo and in couple with cellist Pietro Grossi.

Since the early 1950s Ghiglia focused his career on composing film scores, often working in the documentary genre. In 1976 he formed the stage company "Teatro-Canzone" with his wife Adriana Martino. He also composed incidental music for all the stage plays by Mario Missiroli. Between 1980 and 1985 he was vice-president of the Teatro dell'Opera di Roma.

== Selected filmography ==
- Adiós gringo (1965)
- Six Days a Week (1965)
- Espionage in Tangier (1965)
- I Knew Her Well (1965)
- Balearic Caper (1966)
- El Rojo (1966)
- Secret Agent Super Dragon (1966)
- 4 Dollars of Revenge (1966)
- Johnny Colt (1966)
- A Stranger in Town (1967)
- The Strange Night (1967)
- Pigsty (1969)
- Psychout for Murder (1969)
- Corbari (1970)
- Tulips of Haarlem (1970)
- Lover of the Great Bear (1971)
- St. Michael Had a Rooster (1972)
- Trevico-Turin: Voyage in Fiatnam (1973)
- To Forget Venice (1979)
