= Giuliano Montaldo =

Italian film director (1930–2023)

Giuliano Montaldo OMRI
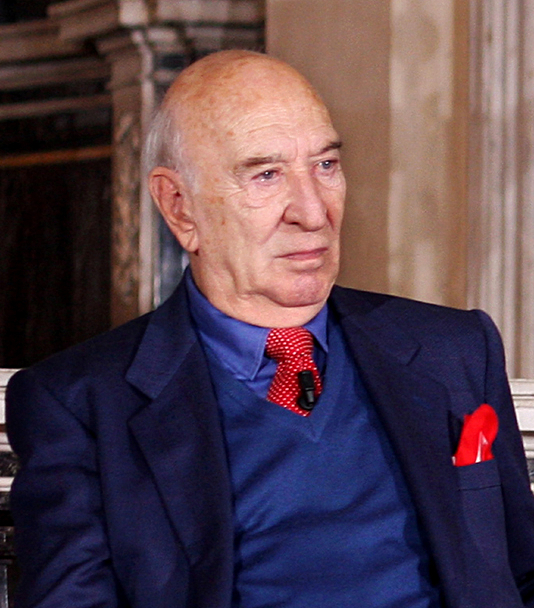
- Montaldo in 2012
- Born: 22 February 1930; Genoa, Italy
- Died: 6 September 2023 (aged 93); Rome, Italy
- Occupations: Director; screenwriter; actor
- Years active: 1951–2023
- Spouse: Vera Pescarolo
- Relatives: Vera Vergani (mother-in-law); Leo Pescarolo (brother-in-law)

Giuliano Montaldo OMRI (22 February 1930 – 6 September 2023) was an Italian film director, screenwriter, and actor. He was known internationally for his biographical docudrama Sacco & Vanzetti (1971), which was nominated for the Palme d'Or, and the historical miniseries Marco Polo (1982), which won the Primetime Emmy Award for Outstanding Limited Series. He served as the 5th President of the Accademia del Cinema Italiano.

== Biography ==
=== Early life and career ===
Montaldo was born in Genoa in 1930. He had his first acting experiences in "mass theatre" productions conducted by the Italian Communist Party. While he was still a young student, Montaldo was recruited by the director Carlo Lizzani for a role in the war drama Attention! Bandits! (1951). Following this experience he began an apprenticeship as an assistant director of Lizzani, Elio Petri, and Gillo Pontecorvo, as well as appearing in Abandoned (1955).

He was Pontecorvo's second unit director for The Battle of Algiers (1966). The director originally wanted him to play the part of Colonel Mathieu, leader of the French Army paratroopers and principal antagonist of the film. Montaldo talked him out of it, believing audiences wouldn't take the film seriously with him in the role.

"I took him aside and said, Gillo, listen: All through the movie you hear about this paratroop leader, Colonel Mathieu. Everybody is afraid of him, everybody is waiting for him, the audience expects to see a fierce fighter coming. Now, imagine a screening on a Saturday afternoon at the Adriano in Rome. Everyone is afraid, waiting for this Mathieu to show up, and when he appears, someone in the theater shouts, ‘It’s that jerk Montaldo, look!’ and the cinema breaks out with laughter. Is that what you want? Eventually he changed his mind."

In 1960, he made his debut as a director with Pigeon Shoot, about the partisan resistance, which entered a competition in Venice Film Festival in 1961.

=== International breakthrough ===
In 1965, he wrote and directed The Reckless, a cynical representation of the economic boom of Italy, winning the Special Prize of the Jury at 15th Berlin International Film Festival. He then directed the heist film Grand Slam (1967), which starred an international cast including Edward G. Robinson, Klaus Kinski, and Janet Leigh.

His cinema career continued with Machine Gun McCain, a US-set gangster picture starring John Cassavetes as a convicted bank robber recruited to rob a mob-run Las Vegas casino. The film also starred Peter Falk (in the first of several collaborations with Cassavetes), Britt Ekland and Gena Rowlands. It was nominated for the Cannes Film Festival's Palme d'Or, the first of two times Montaldo would be nominated for the honor.

Montaldo then directed a thematic trilogy about the abuses of the military, judicial and religious power. The first film, The Fifth Day of Peace (1970), was based on the 13 May 1945 German deserter execution. The second, Sacco and Vanzetti (1971), was about the trial, conviction, and executions of two Italian-American anarchists over false charges of murder. The film was a widespread critical success, earning Montaldo his second Palme d'Or nod, and is credited with spreading awareness of the duo's story worldwide. The soundtrack, written by Ennio Morricone and Joan Baez, is also well-regarded. The third film of Montaldo's trilogy was Giordano Bruno (1973), about the Italian philosopher and scientist who was executed by the Catholic Church for heresy.

In 1971, he was a member of the jury at the 7th Moscow International Film Festival.

In 1975, he was a second unit director for the Terence Hill-starring Spaghetti Western A Genius, Two Partners and a Dupe.

In 1978, he directed the thriller Closed Circuit. Originally produced for television, the film was nominated for the Golden Bear at the Berlin International Film Festival.

In 1982, he directed the internationally co-produced television miniseries Marco Polo. The series, which aired on NBC in the United States, was the first Western film or television production to be shot on-location in the People's Republic of China, including location shooting in the Forbidden City. The series won Outstanding Limited Series at the 34th Primetime Emmy Awards.

In 1987, he directed Control, an ensemble drama starring Burt Lancaster, Ben Gazzara, Kate Nelligan, Ingrid Thulin and Erland Josephson; and The Gold Rimmed Glasses, which was nominated for the Golden Lion at the Venice Film Festival.

In 1989, he directed Time to Kill (1989), with Nicolas Cage, based on Ennio Flaiano's novel of the Second Italo-Ethiopian War.

=== Later works and retirement ===
Between 1999 and 2008, he was the President of RAI's film production subsidiary Rai Cinema.

In 2008, after a nearly 20-year hiatus, he directed the Fyodor Dostoevsky biopic The Demons of St. Petersberg.

In 2011, he directed his final film, The Entrepreneur.

He retired from directing thereafter, but continued to make acting appearances. He won the David di Donatello for Best Supporting Actor for his role in the 2017 dramedy Friends by Chance.

== Accademia del Cinema Italiano ==
Montaldo was elected th 5th President of the Accademia del Cinema Italiano in 2016. He held the office until 2017. He was appointed Honorary President the following year, a position he held until his death in 2023.

== Honours ==
In 2002, Montaldo was ascended a Cavaliere di gran croce (Knight's Grand Cross) of the Order of Merit of the Italian Republic.

In 2008, he was awarded honorary citizenship of the city of Narni.

== Personal life ==
Montaldo was married to Vera Pescarolo, an assistant director and the daughter of actress Vera Vergani. Their daughter, Elisabetta Montaldo, is a costume designer.

In 2020, Fabrizio Corallo made the documentary Vera & Giuliano, about the private and professional life of the couple.

=== Death ===
Montaldo died on 6 September 2023, at the age of 93.

== Filmography ==
=== As director ===
| Year | Title | Notes |
|---|---|---|
| 1961 | Tiro al piccione | Also co-writer |
| 1963 | Nudi per vivere | Documentary |
| 1964 | Extraconiugale | |
| 1965 | The Reckless | |
| 1967 | Grand Slam | |
| 1969 | Machine Gun McCain | |
| 1970 | The Fifth Day of Peace | Also co-writer |
| 1971 | Sacco & Vanzetti | Also co-writer |
| 1973 | Giordano Bruno | Also co-writer |
| 1976 | And Agnes Chose to Die | |
| 1978 | Closed Circuit | TV movie |
| 1979 | A Dangerous Toy | Also co-writer |
| 1982 | Arlecchino | Short film |
| 1982 | Marco Polo | TV series |
| 1984 | L'addio a Enrico Berlinguer | Documentary |
| 1987 | Control | Also co-writer |
| 1987 | The Gold Rimmed Glasses | Also co-writer |
| 1989 | Time to Kill | Also co-writer |
| 1992 | Ci sarà una volta | Documentary |
| 1997 | Le stagioni dell'aquila | Documentary |
| 2008 | The Demons of St. Petersberg | Also co-writer |
| 2009 | L'oro di Cuba | Documentary |
| 2011 | The Entrepreneur | Also co-writer |

=== Acting roles ===
| Year | Title | Role | Notes |
|---|---|---|---|
| 1951 | Attention! Bandits! | Inspector Lorenzo | |
| 1953 | The Blind Woman of Sorrento | The Priest | |
| 1953 | At the Edge of the City | Don Antonio | |
| 1954 | Chronicle of Poor Lovers | Alfredo | |
| 1954 | High School | Religion teacher | |
| 1955 | Abandoned | Soldier from Tuscany | Cameo appearance |
| 1956 | Kean: Genius or Scoundrel | Audience member | Uncredited |
| 1957 | The Doll That Took the Town | Journalist | Uncredited |
| 1957 | The Most Wonderful Moment | Don Grazzini | |
| 1959 | My Wife's Enemy | Table football player | Uncredited |
| 1961 | The Assassin | Journalist | Uncredited |
| 1965 | The Reckless | Trade Union Secretary | Cameo appearance |
| 1965 | The Dreamer | Party guest | Uncredited |
| 1993 | The Long Silence | Prosecutor | |
| 1995 | Un eroe borghese | Guido Carli | |
| 2006 | The Caiman | Franco Caspio | |
| 2012 | The Haunting of Helena | Professor Fabiano | |
| 2016 | The Big Score | The General | |
| 2017 | Friends by Chance | Giorgio Gherarduci | Final film role |
