= Andrea Crisanti =

Italian production designer and art director (1936–2012)

- Born: 12 June 1936; Rome, Italy
- Died: 7 May 2012 (aged 75)
- Occupation: Art director
- Years active: 1959–2012

Andrea Crisanti (12 June 1936 – 7 May 2012) was an Italian production designer and art director.

== Career ==
Crisanti studied art at the Academy of Fine Arts in Rome. He began his film career as assistant set designer to Mario Garbuglia by working on the set of The Great War (1959) with Mario Monicelli. His independent debut came with Maciste in Hell (1962) by Riccardo Freda.

In 1970, Crisanti met Francesco Rosi, which proved crucial to the success of his career. He later worked on Cinema Paradiso (1988) and A Pure Formality (1994) by Giuseppe Tornatore, which won a David di Donatello Award. Sicily was one of his favourite places, and he recalled the pomp of the 17-century Bourbon period for the set of The Council of Egypt (2002) by Emidio Greco. Crisanti worked on Michelangelo Antonioni's Identification of a Woman (1982), Franco Zeffirelli's Young Toscanini (1988), Gianni Amelio's The Stolen Children (1992), and Andrei Tarkovsky's Nostalghia (1983).

He taught art at Rome's Centro Sperimentale di Cinematografia from 1995 until his death, and was president of A.S.C., the Set and Costume Designers Association.

== Filmography ==
=== Production designer ===
- Chronicle of a Death Foretold (1988)
- Cinema Paradiso (1988)
- Swallows Never Die in Jerusalem (1994)
- Colpo di luna (1995)
- A Pure Formality (1995)
- The Truce (1997)
- Viper (2001)
- The Emperor's New Clothes (2001)
- Strange Crime (2004)
- Sacred Heart (2005)
- Face Addict (documentary, 2005)
- The Lark Farm (2007)

=== Art director ===
- The Mattei Affair, 1972)
- Lucky Luciano (1973)
- Illustrious Corpses (1976)
- Three Tigers Against Three Tigers (1977)
- Christ Stopped at Eboli (1978)
- A Leap in the Dark (1980)
- Identification of a Woman (1982)
- Nostalghia (1983)
- Devil in the Flesh (1986)
- Young Toscanini (1988)
- The Palermo Connection (1990)
- Everybody's Fine (1990)
- The Stolen Children (1993)

=== Other ===
- Three Brothers (1981)
- Talcum Powder (1982)
- No Thanks, Coffee Makes Me Nervous (1982)

== Awards and recognition ==
BAFTA Awards

- 1991: Nominated for a BAFTA Film Award in the Best Production Design category for Cinema Paradiso (1988)

David di Donatello Awards

- 2006: Nominated in the category Best Production Design (Migliore Scenografo) for The Goodbye Kiss (2006)
- 2005: Won in the category Best Production Design (Migliore Scenografo) for Sacred Heart (2005)
- 1995: Won in the category Best Production Design (Migliore Scenografo) for A Pure Formality (1994)

Italian National Syndicate of Film Journalists

- 2007: Nominated for a Silver Ribbon in the category Best Production Design (Migliore Scenografia) for The Lark Farm (2007)
- 2006: Nominated for a Silver Ribbon in the category Best Production Design (Migliore Scenografia) for Sacred Heart (2005)
- 2003: Nominated for a Silver Ribbon in the category Best Production Design (Migliore Scenografia) for Facing Windows (2003)
- 2002: Won a Silver Ribbon in the category Best Production Design (Migliore Scenografia) for The Council of Egypt (2002)
