= Lucky Luciano (film) =

1973 film by Francesco Rosi

- US film poster
- Directed by: Francesco Rosi
- Screenplay by: Francesco Rosi; Lino Iannuzzi; Tonino Guerra; Jerome Chodorov
- Story by: Francesco Rosi
- Produced by: Franco Cristaldi; André Génovès
- Starring: Gian Maria Volonté; Rod Steiger; Edmond O'Brien; Charles Siragusa; Vincent Gardenia; Charles Cioffi; Silverio Blasi
- Narrated by: P. M. Pasinetti
- Cinematography: Pasqualino De Santis
- Edited by: Ruggero Mastroianni
- Music by: Piero Piccioni
- Production companies: Vides Cinematografica; Les Films de la Boétie; Harbor Productions
- Distributed by: Titanus Distribuzione (Italy); Cinema International Corporation (France)
- Release date: 1973
- Running time: 105 minutes
- Country: Italy; France
- Languages: Italian; English

Lucky Luciano is a 1973 biographical crime film about the Sicilian gangster Charles “Lucky” Luciano. It is directed by Francesco Rosi, and written by Rosi, Tonino Guerra, Lino Iannuzzi, and Jerome Chodorov. It stars Gian Maria Volonté as the title character, with Rod Steiger, Vincent Gardenia, Charles Cioffi, and Edmond O'Brien. Charles Siragusa, one of the real-life federal narcotics agents who pursued Luciano, plays himself in the film and also served as technical consultant. The film is an Italian and French co-production, filmed on-location in Italy and New York City.

== Plot ==
Born in Sicily as Salvatore Lucania, Charles “Lucky” Luciano rises to become “the boss of all bosses” of the American Mafia in the 1930s by eliminating his rivals for power. When eventually imprisoned, Luciano eventually secures his release by offering his services to military intelligence during World War II, receiving a commutation from New York Governor Thomas E. Dewey and subsequently being deported to Italy.

Settling in Naples, Luciano takes control of the underground drug trade, managing to avoid prosecution through the use of proxies, covertly running his operation out of a race track. Federal Bureau of Narcotics agent Charles Siragusa is assigned to bring down Luciano, managing to turn his associate Gene Giannini informant. Giannini tries to lure Luciano out of the country to Marseille, but Luciano refuses to talk business.

When Giannini fails to get Siragusa the results he wants, he allows the informant to spend a year in an Italian jail for carrying counterfeit currency. Giannini attempts to contact Siragusa by sending letters through his mistress, but she has begun an affair with Luciano who reads their contents and learns of his friend's double-dealing. Siragusa sends Giannini back to the United States to testify against Luciano, but he's assassinated on Luciano's orders before he can do so. Siragusa's superiors order him to halt his investigation. He accuses them of trying to cover for Dewey, claiming that he only commuted Luciano after the mobster bribed him, though they deny it.

By 1962, dozens of Luciano's associates in the drug trade have been arrested. The Italian authorities detain him and reveal they have discovered his smuggling scheme. Under immense stress, Luciano falls ill but seemingly recovers. Police tail him to the airport where he is to meet with a filmmaker writing a screenplay about his life, but he suffers a fatal heart attack and dies.

== Cast ==
- Gian Maria Volonté as Charles “Lucky” Luciano
- Charles Siragusa as himself, a U.S. narcotics agent
- Rod Steiger as Gene Giannini
- Edmond O'Brien as Harry J. Anslinger
- Vincent Gardenia as Colonel Charles Poletti
- Silverio Blasi as Italian Commissario
- Larry Gates as Judge William Bernard Herlands
- Magda Konopka as Contessa
- Dino Curcio as Don Ciccio
- Karin Petersen as Igea Lissoni
- Jacques Monod as French Commissioner
- Luigi Infantino as opera singer
- Carlo Mazzarella as radio journalist
- John Francis Lane as reporter in Naples
- P. M. Pasinetti as the narrator

== Style ==
Like Rosi's previous film The Mattei Affair, the film is presented in a docudrama style representing Rosi's notion of cine-inchieste (film investigation), avoiding the personal aspects of the biopic or gangster genre and focusing on the researched facts of Luciano's life and activities, and their broader implications.

== Production ==
Filming took place on-location in Genoa, Naples, Palermo and New York City. Studio scenes were shot at the Vides Cinematografica soundstages in Rome.

== Reception ==
In a retrospective review for The New Yorker, Michael Sragow wrote "It’s a peculiar political bio-pic. By casting Luciano’s real-life nemesis—the narcotics agent Charles Siragusa—as himself, Rosi hits on a docu-Brecht technique. The linchpin scenes dramatize Mob-government collusion that amounts to Mafiagate (both here and in Italy). In between come Siragusa’s bouts of edifying speechmaking—and his non-pro acting makes them oddly persuasive."

Derek Smith wrote for Slant Magazine, "While ostensibly a biopic, Lucky Luciano avoids the clear-eyed, paint-by-numbers approach we’ve come to expect from modern entries in the genre. Rosi displays little to no interest in the rise-and-fall narrative that could certainly be applied to the godfather of the American mafia or any oversimplified psychological analysis about the famed mobster. Luciano, played with stoic immutability by Gian Maria Volontè, is instead presented as something of a cipher, whose main function is as the primary link between America and Italy in the immediate aftermath of WWI, helping both sides to exploit black markets in mutually beneficial ways."

=== Accolades ===
Ceremony	Category	Recipient	Result
1974 Nastro d'Argento	Best Cinematography	Pasqualino De Santis	Nominated
1974 Valladolid International Film Festival	Best Film	Francesco Rosi	Nominated
1975 Turkish Film Critics Association Awards	Best Foreign Film	—N/a	Won

Lucky Luciano was shown as part of the Cannes Classics section of the 2013 Cannes Film Festival.

== See also ==
- List of Italian films of 1973
- List of French films of 1973
