= Gian Maria Volonté =

Italian actor (1933–1994)

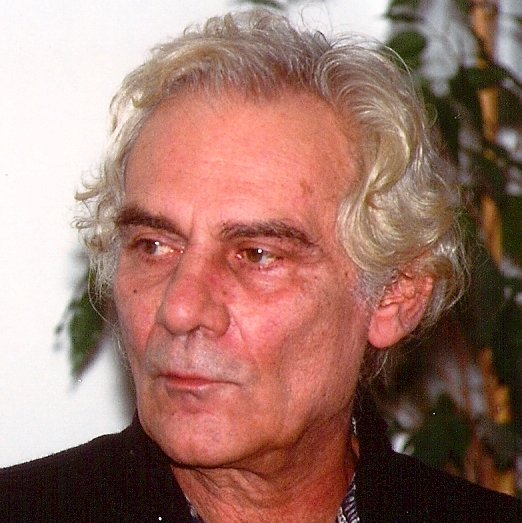
- Born: 9 April 1933; Milan, Kingdom of Italy
- Died: 6 December 1994 (aged 61); Florina, Greece
- Other names: John Wells; Johnny Wels
- Occupation: Actor
- Years active: 1957–1994
- Partners: Carla Gravina (1960–1970); Armenia Balducci; Angelica Ippolito (1980s–1994; his death)
- Children: 2
- Relatives: Claudio Camaso (brother)
- Website: www.gianmariavolonte.it

Gian Maria Volonté (Italian pronunciation: [ˈdʒam maˈriːa volonˈte]; 9 April 1933 – 6 December 1994) was an Italian actor and activist. He is known for his roles in Italian Western films: Ramón Rojo in Sergio Leone's A Fistful of Dollars (1964), El Indio in Leone's For a Few Dollars More (1965), El Chuncho Munoz in Damiano Damiani's A Bullet for the General (1966) and Professor Brad Fletcher in Sergio Sollima's Face to Face (1967) as well as high-profile social dramas depicting the political and social stirrings of Italian and European society in the 1960s and 1970s, including four films directed by Elio Petri – We Still Kill the Old Way (1967), Investigation of a Citizen Above Suspicion (1970), The Working Class Goes to Heaven (1971), and Todo modo (1976). He is also recognized for his performances in Jean-Pierre Melville's Le Cercle Rouge (1970), Giuliano Montaldo's Sacco & Vanzetti (1971) and Giordano Bruno (1973), and Francesco Rosi's Christ Stopped at Eboli (1979).

Among other accolades, Volonté won two David di Donatello Awards and three Nastro d'Argento Awards. He won the Best Actor Award at the 36th Cannes Film Festival for The Death of Mario Ricci (1983), and the Silver Bear at the 37th Berlin International Film Festival for The Moro Affair (1986). Director Francesco Rosi said that he "stole the soul of his characters".

== Early life ==
Volonté was born in Milan, Lombardy, but grew up in Turin, Piedmont. His father Mario was a Fascist officer from Saronno, north of Milan, who in 1944 was in command of the Black Brigades of Chivasso, near Turin. His mother, Carolina Bianchi, belonged to a wealthy Milanese industrial family, and his younger brother Claudio was an actor as well. He went to Rome to train for an acting career at the Accademia Nazionale di Arte Drammatica Silvio D'Amico, obtaining a degree in 1957.

== Career ==
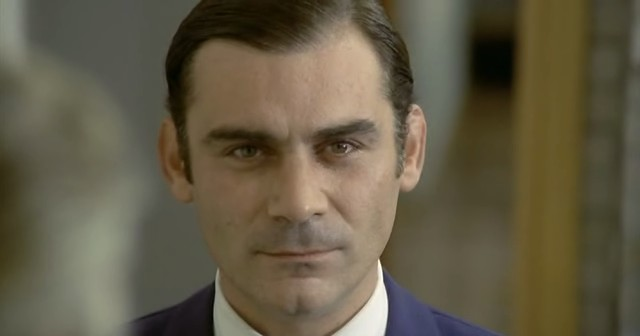
Volonté in Investigation of a Citizen Above Suspicion (1970)

Volonté made his debut in 1960 in Under Ten Flags, directed by Duilio Coletti. Just four years later, he played "Ramón Rojo" in A Fistful of Dollars (1964), and "El Indio" in For a Few Dollars More (1965), both for cash reasons as he considered the two films to be generic exploitation entertainment and was more interested in projects with a political message. Both films were directed by the then-unknown Sergio Leone, and Volonté's roles in them would bring him his greatest recognition from American audiences.

He played Carlo Levi in Christ Stopped at Eboli (1979), which was based on Levi's autobiographical account of his years in internal exile in Aliano, Southern Italy, in the 1930s. Volonté played the memorable role of the Bandito-turned-guerrilla, El Chuncho, in A Bullet for the General (1966).

Volonté's performances as memorable, neurotic characters, or as a gifted leader of brigands or revolutionaries, together with the unexpected, worldwide success of the films, gave him international fame. Volonté had already played comedies, including On the Tiger's Back (1961) by Luigi Comencini, and confirmed his versatility in For Love and Gold (1966). However, he found his main dimension in dramatic roles for Bandits in Milan (1968), by Carlo Lizzani, Slap the Monster on Page One (1972) by Marco Bellocchio, The Working Class Goes to Heaven (1972) by his friend Elio Petri, and Il sospetto (1975) by Francesco Maselli.

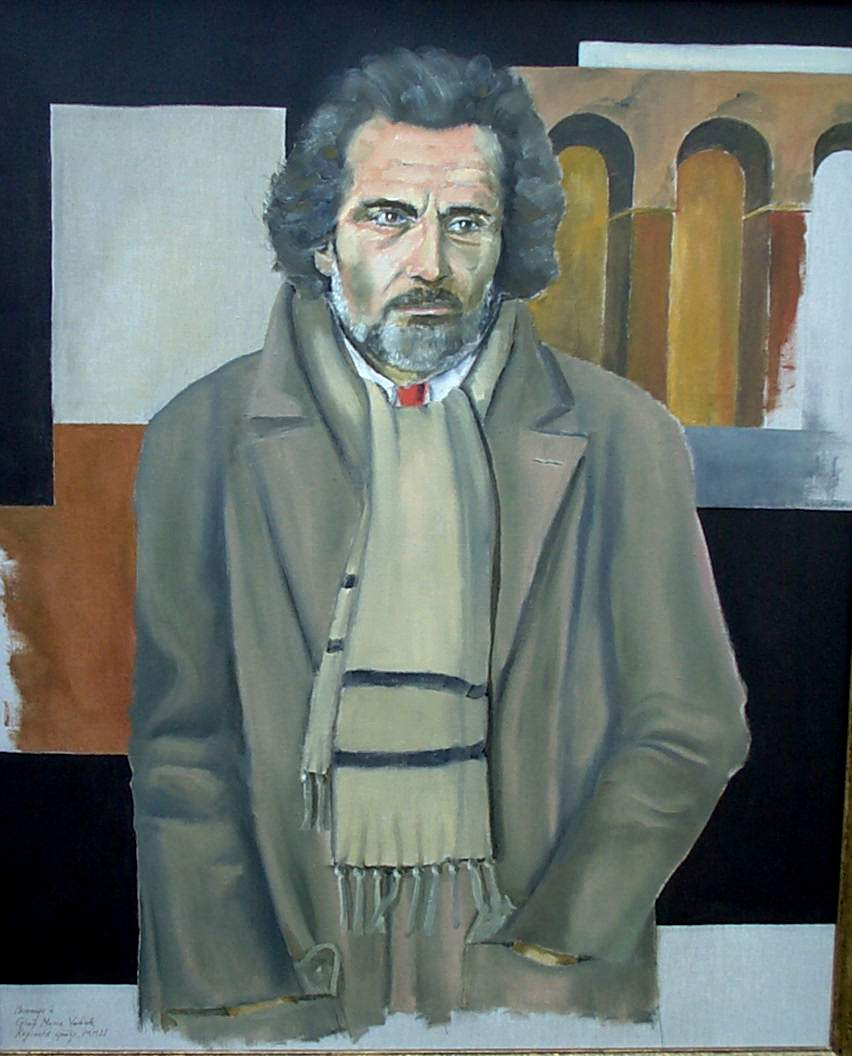
A homage to Gian Maria Volonté (seen in his role as Carlo Levi in Christ Stopped at Eboli) by Reginald Gray

In 1968, Volonté won a Silver Ribbon as best actor for A ciascuno il suo, also directed by Elio Petri. Volonté received the same award for two other performances: Petri's Investigation of a Citizen Above Suspicion (1971, winner of an Academy Award as best foreign film), considered by many to be his finest; and in The Abyss (1989).

In 1983 he won the award for Best Actor at the 1983 Cannes Film Festival for La Mort de Mario Ricci. Four years later, at the 37th Berlin International Film Festival, he won the Silver Bear for Best Actor for Il caso Moro. In 1988 Volonté starred in the Cannes Film Festival Official Selection, The Abyss, as a physician-alchemist. The film was directed by André Delvaux from Marguerite Yourcenar's famous novel of the same name. In 1990, Volonté was named Best European Actor for Porte aperte. In 1991, at the 48th Venice International Film Festival, he won the Golden Lion for career achievement.

== Critical reception and commentary ==
Writing for The New Yorker, critic Pauline Kael had much to say about Volonté's various performances. She called him "a chameleon-star, a fiery Italian Olivier", with the suggestion that he might have Olivier's impudent wit, too. Of his performance in Sacco and Vanzetti, she said that "when he marched to his death, you really felt it would take a lot of juice to kill him." Of his performance in The Mattei Affair, she called out his "zingy-lion eyes" and "foxy intensity." In The French Conspiracy, Kael mentions that he has the commanding presence to play [a Moroccan revolutionary]" noting that Volonté has "a conscious magnetism and the ability to project intelligence."

== Personal life ==
Volonté was a strong political activist and known for his pro-communist leanings. In 1981, he helped Oreste Scalzone to flee from capture in Italy to Denmark. He was the partner of Italian actress and Italian Communist Party deputy Carla Gravina for almost 10 years after they met when they played Romeo and Juliet in a theatre production in 1960. The two had a daughter Giovanna, born in the early 1960s. He was the long-time partner of director Armenia Balducci, who shared his political commitment and collaborated on several of his films. Actress Angelica Ippolito was his companion from the mid 1980s until his death in 1994.

== Death ==
Volonté died from a heart attack at the age of 61 in 1994 at Florina, Greece, during the filming of Ulysses' Gaze. Volonté's grave is in a small cemetery on the Sardinian island of La Maddalena, according to his wishes.

== Selected filmography ==
- Under Ten Flags (1960, directed by Duilio Coletti) as Samuel Braunstein
- Girl with a Suitcase (1961, directed by Valerio Zurlini) as Piero Benotti
- Journey Beneath the Desert (1961, directed by Edgar G. Ulmer) as Tarath
- Hercules and the Conquest of Atlantis (1961, directed by Vittorio Cottafavi) as Re di Sparta
- On the Tiger's Back (1961, directed by Luigi Comencini) as Papaleo
- A Man for Burning (1962, directed by Paolo and Vittorio Taviani and Valentino Orsini) as Salvatore
- The Four Days of Naples (1962, directed by Nanni Loy) as Stimolo (uncredited)
- Noche de verano (1963, directed by Jorge Grau) as Alberto Suárez
- Il terrorista (1963, directed by Gianfranco De Bosio) as Braschi, l'ingeniere
- A Fistful of Dollars (credited as "John Wells") (1964, directed by Sergio Leone) as Ramón Rojo
- The Magnificent Cuckold (1965, directed by Antonio Pietrangeli) as The Councillor
- For a Few Dollars More (1965, directed by Sergio Leone) as El Indio
- Seasons of Our Love (1966, directed by Florestano Vancini) as Leonardo Varzi
- Wake Up and Die (1966, directed by Carlo Lizzani) as Inspector Moroni
- For Love and Gold (1966, directed by Mario Monicelli) as Teofilatto dei Leonzi
- La strega in amore (1966, directed by Damiano Damiani) as Fabrizio
- A Gangstergirl (1966, directed by Frans Weisz)
- A Bullet for the General (1967, directed by Damiano Damiani) as El Chuncho Munoz
- We Still Kill the Old Way (1967, directed by Elio Petri) as Prof. Paolo Laurana
- Face to Face (1967, directed by Sergio Sollima) as Professor Brad Fletcher
- The Seven Cervi Brothers (1968, directed by Gianni Puccini)
- Bandits in Milan (1968, directed by Carlo Lizzani) as Pietro 'Piero' Cavallero
- Summit (1968, directed by Giorgio Bontempi)
- The Bandit (1969, directed by Carlo Lizzani) as Gramigna
- Under the Sign of Scorpio (1969, directed by Paolo and Vittorio Taviani) as Renno
- Investigation of a Citizen Above Suspicion (1970, directed by Elio Petri) as "Il Dottore", the Police Inspector
- Wind from the East (1970, directed by Jean-Luc Godard and the Dziga Vertov Group) as Le ranger nordiste
- Many Wars Ago (1970, directed by Francesco Rosi) as Lt. Ottolenghi
- Le Cercle Rouge (1970, directed by Jean-Pierre Melville) as Vogel
- Sacco e Vanzetti (1971, directed by Giuliano Montaldo) as Bartolomeo Vanzetti
- The Working Class Goes to Heaven (1971, directed by Elio Petri) as Lulù Massa
- The Mattei Affair (1972, directed by Francesco Rosi) as Enrico Mattei
- The Assassination (1972, directed by Yves Boisset) as Sadiel
- Slap the Monster on Page One (1972, directed by Marco Bellocchio) as Bizanti
- Lucky Luciano (1973, directed by Francesco Rosi) as Charles 'Lucky' Luciano
- Giordano Bruno (1973, directed by Giuliano Montaldo) as Giordano Bruno
- The Suspect (1975, directed by Francesco Maselli) as Emilio
- Letters from Marusia (1976, directed by Miguel Littín) as Gregorio
- Todo modo (1976, directed by Elio Petri) as M.
- I Am Afraid (1977, directed by Damiano Damiani) as Brigadiere Ludovico Graziano
- Christ Stopped at Eboli (1979, directed by Francesco Rosi) as Carlo Levi
- Ogro (1979, directed by Gillo Pontecorvo) as Izarra
- Stark System (1980, directed by Armenia Balducci) as Stark
- The Lady of the Camellias (1981, directed by Mauro Bolognini) as Plessis
- La Certosa di Parma (1982, TV miniseries, directed by Mauro Bolognini) as Count Mosca
- La Mort de Mario Ricci (1983, directed by Claude Goretta) as Bernard Fontana
- Il caso Moro (1986, directed by Giuseppe Ferrara) as Aldo Moro
- Chronicle of a Death Foretold (1987, directed by Francesco Rosi) as Dr. Cristo Bedoya
- Un ragazzo di Calabria (1987, directed by Luigi Comencini) as Felice
- The Abyss (1988, directed by André Delvaux) as Zénon
- Pestalozzi's Mountain (1989, directed by Peter von Gunten) as Pestalozzi
- Tre colonne in cronaca (1990, directed by Carlo Vanzina) as Alberto Landolfi
- Open Doors (1990, directed by Gianni Amelio) as Judge Vito Di Francesco
- A Simple Story (1991, directed by Emidio Greco) as Carmelo Franzò
- Funes, a Great Love (1993, directed by Raúl de la Torre) as Bergama
- Banderas, the Tyrant (1993, directed by José Luis García Sánchez) as Santos Banderas (final film role)
