= The Magliari =

I Magliari
- Directed by: Francesco Rosi
- Written by: Francesco Rosi; Suso Cecchi d'Amico
- Produced by: Franco Cristaldi
- Starring: Alberto Sordi; Renato Salvatori
- Cinematography: Gianni Di Venanzo
- Music by: Piero Piccioni
- Distributed by: Cristaldi Film
- Release date: 1959
- Running time: 121 minutes
- Countries: Italy, France
- Language: Italian

I magliari (internationally released as The Magliari) is a 1959 Italian drama film directed by Francesco Rosi. The film won the silver ribbon for best cinematography.

In 2008, the film was included on the Italian Ministry of Cultural Heritage’s 100 Italian films to be saved, a list of 100 films that "have changed the collective memory of the country between 1942 and 1978."

== Plot summary ==
Totonno is the leader of a gang of Italian workers who for years have been in West Germany. The group picks up rags and second hand cloths, marketing them to customers for sheer fabric with which to sew clothes. The work is dishonest.

Mario is a fellow Italian in Germany to work as a miner but decides to return to Italy after losing his job and family Totonno steals his passport to avoid the police and then offers Mario a job as “magliaro” (cloth seller). Mario decides to stay.

Totonno and his gang are exposed and decide to relocate to Hamburg. They encounters a band of Pole, who're doing the same dirty work. Mario begins an affair with Paula, the wife of a wealthy man.

== Cast ==
- Alberto Sordi: Ferdinando Magliulo, detto Totonno
- Belinda Lee: Paula Mayer
- Renato Salvatori: Mario Balducci
- Nino Vingelli: Vincenzo
- Aldo Giuffrè: Armando
- Aldo Bufi Landi: Rodolfo Valentino
- Josef Dahmen: Mr. Mayer

== Production ==
Filming took place in Hamburg, Germany in April–May 1959.

It was one of a series of sexually aggressive roles Lee played in Europe.

== Awards ==
It won best black and white photography at the Italian Film Critics Award.

== Reception ==
Senses of Cinema wrote "Unfairly neglected by critics and historians, the film is usually regarded a prelude to the Neapolitan director's ambitious, labyrinthine chronicles of power and corruption of the 1960s and 70s."
