= A Simple Story =

A Simple Story may refer to:

- A Simple Story (novel) by Elizabeth Inchbald
- A Simple Story, a novella by Shmuel Yosef Agnon, translated from the 1935 Hebrew original, Sippur Pashut
- "A Simple Story (poem), 1979, by Gwen Harwood
- A Simple Story (1960 film), a Soviet drama film
- A Simple Story (1970 film), a Tunisian drama film
- A Simple Story (1978 film), a French drama film
- A Simple Story (1991 film), an Italian drama film

== See also ==
- Una storia semplice (disambiguation)
