= The Moment of Truth (1965 film) =

1965 film

- Film poster
- Directed by: Francesco Rosi
- Written by: Pedro Beltrán; Ricardo Muñoz Suay; Pere Portabella; Francesco Rosi
- Starring: Miguel Mateo 'Miguelín'
- Cinematography: Pasqualino De Santis; Gianni Di Venanzo; Aiace Parolin
- Edited by: Mario Serandrei
- Music by: Piero Piccioni
- Release date: 3 March 1965
- Running time: 110 minutes
- Country: Italy
- Language: Italian

The Moment of Truth (Italian: Il momento della verità) is a 1965 Italian drama film directed by Francesco Rosi. It was entered into the 1965 Cannes Film Festival.

== Plot ==
Miguel leaves the countryside because he doesn't want to become a poor farmer like his father. In the big city he tries everything to make it but accomplishes nothing until he becomes a bullfighter.

== Cast ==
- Miguel Mateo 'Miguelín' as Miguel Romero 'Miguelín'
- José Gómez Sevillano
- Pedro Basauri 'Pedrucho' as himself
- Linda Christian as Linda, American woman
- Curro Carmona
- Luque Gago
- Salvador Mateo
- Gregorio Sánchez

== Reception ==
On Rotten Tomatoes, the film has an aggregate score of 80% based on 8 positive and 2 negative critic reviews.
