= Crisanti =

Crisanti is an Italian surname. Notable people with the surname include:

- Andrea Crisanti (1936–2012), Italian production designer and art director
- Gabriele Crisanti (1935–2010), Italian film producer
- Vincent Crisanti (born 1953), Canadian city councillor in Toronto
