= The Working Class Goes to Heaven =

1971 Italian film

- Italian film poster
- Italian: La classe operaia va in paradiso
- Directed by: Elio Petri
- Screenplay by: Elio Petri; Ugo Pirro
- Produced by: Ugo Tucci
- Starring: Gian Maria Volonté; Mariangela Melato; Gino Pernice; Luigi Diberti; Donato Castellaneta; Salvo Randone
- Cinematography: Luigi Kuveiller
- Edited by: Ruggero Mastroianni
- Music by: Ennio Morricone
- Production company: Euro International Films
- Distributed by: Euro International Films
- Release dates: 1971 (Italy); 11 May 1975 (New York)
- Running time: 125 minutes
- Country: Italy
- Language: Italian

The Working Class Goes to Heaven (Italian: La classe operaia va in paradiso), released in the US as Lulu the Tool, is a 1971 Italian satirical political drama film directed by Elio Petri. It depicts a factory worker's realisation of his own condition as a simple tool in the process of production. The film was awarded the Grand Prix du Festival International du Film at the 25th Cannes Film Festival, sharing it with Francesco Rosi's The Mattei Affair.

== Plot ==
Lulù Massa, 31 years old, has been working in the same factory for 15 years. Because the management uses his efficiency to justify their demands for higher output, he is disliked by his colleagues. Lulù cares neither for the unionists who demand higher pay rates and reduced working hours, nor the students outside the factory gates who appeal to the workers to rise up against the factory owners. From time to time, he visits his former colleague Militina who has been interred in a mental institution after collapsing under the working conditions. Militina fantasizes about militant actions and "breaking the wall".

When Lulù loses a finger in a working accident, his attitude changes drastically. He joins a radical faction among the workers who call a strike, has an affair with a female co-worker and invites the students to move into his flat. As a result, his lover Lidia leaves him together with her son. After the unionists have reached an agreement with the management, the employees return to work, except Lulù who has been fired for his agitational behaviour. Lulù goes to see the student protestors, who declare that he is of no use for them because he is an individual case.

Lulù, now on the verge of madness, only vaguely realises that Lidia and her son have moved back in and that the unionists have convinced the management to rehire him. Back in the factory, working in an assembly line with other colleagues, he recounts a dream in which he broke a wall, finding himself and his co-workers emerge from a fog.

== Cast ==
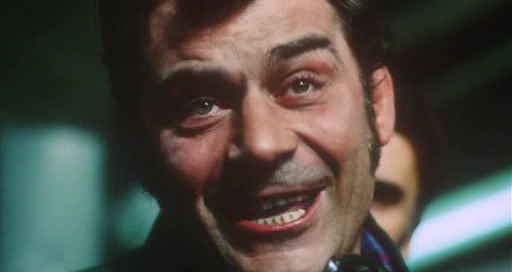
Gian Maria Volonté as Lulù.

- Gian Maria Volonté – Ludovico "Lulù" Massa
- Mariangela Melato – Lidia
- Gino Pernice – the syndicalist
- Luigi Diberti – Bassi
- Salvo Randone – Militina
- Donato Castellaneta – Marx
- Giuseppe Fortis – Valli
- Corrado Solari
- Flavio Bucci – Operaio
- Luigi Uzzo
- Giovanni Bignamini
- Ezio Marano – the timekeeper
- Adriano Amidei Migliano – the technician
- Antonio Mangano
- Lorenzo Magnolia
- Federico Scrobogna – Pinuccio

== Production ==
The factory scenes in The Working Class Goes to Heaven were shot in a factory in Novara, Piedmont, which had shut down and been occupied by its former workers, with many of the personnel serving as extras in the film. Other shooting locations included the Ospedale Maggiore di Novara and the Istituto Tecnico Industriale OMAR.

== Release ==
The Working Class Goes to Heaven premiered at the 1971 Mostra Internazionale del Cinema Libero ("International exhibition of free cinema") in Porretta Terme, Emilia-Romagna. Petri later claimed that, after the screening, filmmaker Jean-Marie Straub demanded that the film be burned. Other sources attribute this statement to film critic Pio Baldelli.

== Reception ==
The film's reception by the Italian press was mixed. The Segnalazioni cinematografiche lauded its "solid cinematographic language" and the precise portrayal of its central character, but criticised the "overabundance of themes and some long-windedness". Natalia Ginzburg in La Stampa accused the film of being superfluous and confusing, held together only by Gian Maria Volonté's presence.

In the Spring 1973 volume of Film Quarterly, James Roy MacBean compared The Working Class Goes to Heaven to the prison drama The Brig as a "jarringly abrasive" portrayal of factory work. The New York Times critic A. H. Weiler called the film "both fascinating and sobering" upon its 1975 New York premiere. Contrary to this, author Mira Liehm referred to it as a "weaker" Petri film and "heavy-handed" in her 1986 book on Italian Cinema.

== Awards ==
- Grand Prix du Festival International du Film, Special Mention Gian Maria Volonté, 25th Cannes Film Festival, 1972
- David di Donatello Award for Best Film, 1972
- Nastro d'Argento for Best Actress (Mariangela Melato) and Best Supporting Actor (Salvo Randone), 1972
