= Una storia semplice =

Una storia semplice may refer to:

- Una storia semplice (novel), a 1989 novel by Leonardo Sciascia
- Una storia semplice (film), a 1991 film directed by Emidio Greco
- Una storia semplice (album), a 2012 album by Italian band Negramaro
