= More Than a Miracle =

1967 film by Francesco Rosi

- Sophia Loren and Omar Sharif in More Than a Miracle
- Directed by: Francesco Rosi
- Screenplay by: Tonino Guerra; Raffaele La Capria; Giuseppe Patroni Griffi; Francesco Rosi
- Story by: Giambattista Basile
- Produced by: Carlo Ponti
- Starring: Omar Sharif; Sophia Loren; Dolores del Río
- Cinematography: Pasqualino De Santis
- Edited by: Jolanda Benvenuti
- Music by: Piero Piccioni
- Distributed by: MGM
- Release date: 1967
- Running time: 104 minutes
- Countries: Italy; France
- Language: English

More Than a Miracle (Italian: C'era una volta) is a 1967 film also titled Cinderella Italian Style and Happily Ever After. It stars Sophia Loren, Omar Sharif and Dolores del Río. The movie has a fairy tale narrative. Filmed in the countryside outside Naples, Francesco Rosi directed and Carlo Ponti produced. The theme music was a hit for Roger Williams, reaching #2 on Billboard's survey. Sergio Franchi recorded the title song (written by Kusik; Snyder; Piccioni) on his 1968 RCA Victor album, I'm a Fool To Want You.

== Plot ==
The film recounts the misadventures of a beautiful and temperamental village girl Isabella (Sophia Loren) and an ill-tempered Spanish prince, Rodrigo (Omar Sharif). The prince is a risk taker, avoiding his parents' wishes for him to marry. The movie starts with the prince trying to tame a wild horse in the courtyard, while his mother the queen, asks when he will do as his father wishes and marry? There are 7 princesses waiting to dine with him, for him to choose from, but the prince isn’t interested and tells his mother as much, as he rides off leaving the palace.

While riding the horse in the countryside, he is thrown off and loses the horse. The prince then walks to a hill where he sees a monk flying in the air above a group of laughing children. The monk comes down and tells him it’s time to find a wife. The monk then gives him a donkey and some flour, telling him to ask someone to make him seven dumplings. On the way back, he finds his horse in field where Isabella is putting vegetables she’s pulling out of the ground into a bag she has. The prince tells her its his horse, and she says the horse is hers. They both accuse each other of being a thief. At this moment the kings guards come by looking for the prince, he grabs her and forces her to hide in the bushes with him until they leave, and then tries to kiss her. She pushes him away. She takes his hiding as proof he is a thief, and protests the horse is hers. Growing tired of this, the prince pushes her into the dirt and throws her supplies off the horse as he jumps onto it and tries to ride it yet again. Isabella laughs as the horse throws him off, saying “see, he doesn’t know you”. She then cleans off her scrapes and takes her crops home, with the prince following her and riding circles around her the whole way.

Once Isabella reaches her home she is relieved to have lost the prince, but she hasn’t, and he knocks on her door demanding she use the flour to make him seven dumplings. She agrees just to be rid of him. She serves the dumplings, and there are only six. The prince asks where the seventh dumpling is, and she has no real answer and asks him to leave. He says without the seventh dumpling he will die, and proceeds to play dead in front of her house. Isabella initially thinks she killed him, but becomes angry at the ruse making her feel stupid. She says two can play that game, and knocks on all her neighbors doors to ask them for help because a “Spaniard died in front of my house”. The neighbors then steal the prince’s ring and bury his body in a shallow grave covered by leaves and tree branches.

Night comes and with it so does a storm. Isabella becomes worried about the prince and goes to where he is buried to check on him. Moving the branches she discovers he is gone, and an old woman/witch comes up to her and tells her she lost a prince. The old woman then takes Isabella to the woods where she meets a group of old witches and asks for their help locating the prince and if he loves her. The witches tell her he did love her, and argue with each other about what is the best spell to make a man fall in love with you, arguing over two specific methods. Another witch stares into water and successfully locates the prince at a nunnery and tells Isabella, but as this happens an owl screams causing the prince to catch a chill, and the wind to blow aggressively because of the magic. The owl flies towards Isabella scaring her, and she cries out for the Madonna, which causes all the old witches to scream and flee.

After the witches leave Isabella struggles to remember the two spells the old witches told her. Remembering only one fully, she puts the tip of her tongue in the keyhole of a lock, which instantly physically paralyzes the princes, making him completely unable to move.

The king of Spain orders Rodrigo to choose a wife among seven princesses within seven days, and for that he arranges a gathering, despite his attraction to Isabella. She joins the cooking team for the seven-day function while the prince searches for her in the countryside. With the help of witches and saints, Isabella finally conquers the heart of her prince and marries him.

== Cast ==
- Omar Sharif as Prince Rodrigo Fernandez
- Sophia Loren as Isabella Candeloro
- Dolores del Río as Queen Mother
- Georges Wilson as Jean-Jacques Bouché 'Monzu'
- Leslie French as Brother Giuseppe da Copertino
- Marina Malfatti as Olimpia Capece Latro, princess Altamura
- Carlo Pisacane as the witch
- Giacomo Furia as friar

== Reception ==
On review aggregator website Rotten Tomatoes, the film holds an approval rating of 43% based on 7 reviews, with an average rating of 5.0/10.

== See also ==
- List of American films of 1967
