= Christ Stopped at Eboli (film) =

- French poster for the film
- Directed by: Francesco Rosi
- Written by: Francesco Rosi; Tonino Guerra; Raffaele La Capria
- Produced by: Nicola Carraro; Franco Cristaldi
- Starring: Gian Maria Volonté; Paolo Bonacelli; Alain Cuny; Lea Massari; Irene Papas; François Simon
- Cinematography: Pasqualino De Santis
- Edited by: Ruggero Mastroianni
- Music by: Piero Piccioni
- Production companies: Rai 2 Vides Cinematografica; Action Films
- Distributed by: Titanus (Italy); Gaumont Distribution (France)
- Release date: 23 February 1979
- Running time: 150 minutes (1979 theatrical release); 220 minutes (uncut TV version)
- Countries: Italy; France
- Language: Italian
- Box office: $82,126

Christ Stopped at Eboli (Italian: Cristo si è fermato a Eboli), also known as Eboli in the United States, is a 1979 drama film directed by Francesco Rosi, adapted from the book of the same name by Carlo Levi. It stars Gian Maria Volonté as Levi, a political dissident under Fascism who was exiled in the Basilicata region in Southern Italy.

The film was shown out of competition at the 1979 Cannes Film Festival and was the first to receive a BAFTA Award for Best Foreign Language Film in 1983.

It was included in the book 1001 Movies You Must See Before You Die.

== Plot ==
Carlo Levi is a painter and writer from Turin. He also has a degree in medicine but has never practised it. Arrested in 1935 by Mussolini's regime for anti-fascist activities, he is confined to Aliano (Gagliano in the novel), a remote town in the region of Lucania, the southern 'instep' of Italy, known today as Basilicata. While the landscape is beautiful, the peasantry are impoverished and mismanaged. They are superstitious and insular; many have emigrated to the United States in search of employment. Since the local doctors are not interested in treating peasants, Levi begins to minister to their health in response to their appeals, establishing a strong relationship with the community.

== Principal cast ==
- Gian Maria Volonté as Carlo Levi
- Paolo Bonacelli as Don Luigi Magalone
- Alain Cuny as Baron Nicola Rotunno
- Lea Massari as Luisa Levi
- Irene Papas as Giulia Venere
- François Simon as Don Traiella
- Antonio Allocca as Don Cosimino

== Production ==
The film was mostly shot in Basilicata in the villages of Craco, Guardia Perticara, Aliano and La Martella, near Matera. Other scenes were filmed in Gravina in Puglia and Santeramo in Colle, Apulia.

== Reception ==
=== Critical response ===
Christ Stopped at Eboli has an approval rating of 90% on Rotten Tomatoes based on 10 reviews and an average rating of 8.10/10. AllMovie rated the film 4 stars out 5.

Mira Liehm, in her volume dedicated to Italian cinema from 1942 to the first half of the 1980s, defines Carlo Levi's book on which the film is based as legendary and writes, as regards the aesthetic language, that the film suffers negatively from the intention to satisfy both a television series and the big screen at the same time, so that Lucania, at the time one of the poorest regions of the peninsula, appears as a holiday resort. The Swiss critic Freddy Bauche adds, among other things, that the film, although an excellent technical exercise, does not follow the poetics present in Salvatore Giuliano, something that Levi's book, instead, could have made possible. Gian Piero Brunetta, besides highlighting the excellent interpretation of Gian Maria Volonté, writes by focusing on the aspects most closely linked to Italian politics treated by Rosi: "It is not ultimately a coincidence that, at a certain point in his career, he encounters the work of Carlo Levi (Christ Stopped at Eboli) or that of Leonardo Sciascia (Excellent Corpses is taken from The Context), two authors who, like him, have worked to try to penetrate the heart of things and to explain individual events in terms of a broader logic."

=== Accolades ===
Award	Category	Recipient	Result	Year	Ref
Chicago International Film Festival	Best Feature	Francesco Rosi	Nominated	1979	
David di Donatello	Best Film		Won	1979	
David di Donatello	Best Director	Francesco Rosi	Won	1979	
Nastro d'Argento	Best Supporting Actress	Lea Massari	Won	1979	
Moscow International Film Festival	Golden Prize	Francesco Rosi	Won	1979	
National Board of Review	Top Foreign Film		Won	1980	
French Syndicate of Cinema Critics	Best Foreign Film	Francesco Rosi	Won	1981	
BAFTA Awards	Best Foreign Language Film	Francesco Rosi	Won	1983	
