= Christ Stopped at Eboli =

1945 memoir by Carlo Levi

- Author: Carlo Levi
- Original title: Cristo si è fermato a Eboli
- Translator: Frances Frenaye
- Language: Italian
- Genre: Memoir
- Publisher: Einaudi
- Publication date: 1945
- English publication date: 1946
- ISBN: 9781250623089

Christ Stopped at Eboli (Italian: Cristo si è fermato a Eboli) is a memoir by Carlo Levi, published in 1945, giving an account of his exile from 1935–1936 to Grassano and Aliano, remote towns in Southern Italy, in the region of Lucania which is known today as Basilicata. In the book he gives Aliano the invented name Gagliano (based on the local pronunciation of Aliano).

"The title of the book comes from an expression by the people of Gagliano who say of themselves, 'Christ stopped short of here, at Eboli' which means, in effect, that they feel they have been bypassed by Christianity, by morality, by history itself—that they have somehow been excluded from the full human experience." Levi explained that Eboli, a location in the region of Campania to the west near the seacoast, is where the road and railway to Basilicata branched away from the coastal north–south routes.

The English translation by Frances Frenaye originally appeared in 1946.

== Background ==
Carlo Levi was a doctor, writer and painter, a native of Turin. In 1935, Levi's anti-fascist beliefs and activism led to his banishment by Benito Mussolini's fascist government to a period of internal exile in a remote region of southern Italy. Despite his status as a political exile Levi was welcomed with open arms, for the people of this area were naturally gracious hosts. His book, Christ Stopped At Eboli, focuses on his year in the villages of the Lucania region and the people he encountered there.

== Grassano and Gagliano ==
The villages of Grassano and Gagliano were extremely poor. They lacked basic goods because they had no shops. The typical meager diet consisted of bread, oil, crushed tomatoes, and peppers. The villages did not have many modern items, and those they did were not often used. The one public toilet (and only bathroom) in town did not have running water, and stood as a retreat for animals rather than people. Also, there was only one car in the area. Homes were sparsely furnished; the most frequent decoration was an American dollar, a photo of US president Roosevelt, or the Madonna di Viggiano displayed on their walls. Health care was atrocious. The two doctors in town were inept. The peasants did not trust them and counted on Levi's medical skills instead, though he was reluctant, and hadn’t practiced in years. Malaria took the lives of many villagers. Education was available, but the mayor who taught class spent more time smoking on the balcony than teaching the children.

The religious values were a mix of Catholicism and mysticism. While people were pious in the sense that they were moral and kind, they were motivated by beliefs in magic and mysticism more than religion. They rarely attended church, and in fact ostracized their priest, who was a drunk, and whose reputation had been ruined early in his career after he had sexual relations with a young student; he had been banished from one place to another for years, and eventually ended up in Gagliano. The priest, however, had just as much dislike for the locals, calling them "donkeys, not Christians." It seems Christianity was not fully embraced. Superstitions, gnomes, and spells seemed to shape daily life, rather than Christian beliefs. People did, however, attend church on holidays, and did respect the Madonna.

== Lucania: fascism and wars ==
The southern part of Italy did not completely support Mussolini and his fascist government, while northerners looked down on southerners and saw them as inferior citizens. Southerners felt torn from Italy, and looked instead towards America as a beacon of hope and prosperity. Levi writes: ”New York, rather than Rome or Naples would be the real capital of the peasants of Lucania, if these men without a country could have a capital at all.”

In 1935, when Italy started a war in Abyssinia (present day Ethiopia), the villagers were indifferent, and it did not affect them. Levi mentions only one man who enlisted to escape his troubled life at home. He notes, however, that the villagers also did not talk about World War I, even though many locals lost their lives.

Near the end of his stay Levi travels north for a funeral. After almost a year in Lucania, he feels inept he had not experienced before. Talking politics with friends , he observes their ignorance of southern issues, listening to them talk about ”the problems of the south”, who is to ascribe, and what can and should be done. They all think the state must take action – ”something concretely useful, and beneficent, and miraculous”. Levi chalks this up to fourteen years’ worth of indoctrination, which has subconsciously ingrained in them the idea of a united, utopian Italy.

== Film adaptation ==
In 1979, the book was adapted into a film, directed by Francesco Rosi and starring Gian Maria Volonté as Carlo Levi.

== Sources ==
- Stopped at Eboli — a brief review, The Booklocker
- Carlo Levi's Book Christ Stopped at Eboli, translated by Frances Frenaye, ISBN 9780141 183213
