= Morel's Invention (film) =

1974 film

- Film poster
- Directed by: Emidio Greco
- Written by: Adolfo Bioy Casares; Andrea Barbato; Emidio Greco
- Produced by: Mario Orfini; Ettore Rosboch
- Starring: Anna Karina
- Cinematography: Silvano Ippoliti
- Edited by: Mario Chiari
- Music by: Nicola Piovani
- Release date: 1974
- Running time: 110 minutes
- Country: Italy
- Language: Italian

Morel's Invention (Italian: L'invenzione di Morel) is a 1974 Italian science fiction film directed by Emidio Greco and starring Anna Karina. It is based on the novel The Invention of Morel by Adolfo Bioy Casares.

== Cast ==
- Anna Karina as Faustine
- Giulio Brogi as The Castaway
- John Steiner as Morel
- Anna-Maria Gherardi
- Ezio Marano
- Claudio Trionfi
- Laura De Marchi
- Valeria Sabel
- Roberto Herlitzka
