= The Mattei Affair =

1972 Italian film directed by Francesco Rosi

- Italian film poster
- Italian: Il Caso Mattei
- Directed by: Francesco Rosi
- Screenplay by: Francesco Rosi; Tonino Guerra; Nerio Minuzzo; Tito Di Stefano
- Story by: Francesco Rosi; Tonino Guerra
- Produced by: Franco Cristaldi
- Starring: Gian Maria Volonté
- Cinematography: Pasqualino De Santis
- Edited by: Ruggero Mastroianni
- Music by: Piero Piccioni
- Production companies: Vides Cinematografica; Verona Produzione
- Distributed by: Paramount Pictures
- Release dates: May 1972 (Cannes); 20 May 1973 (New York City)
- Running time: 116 minutes
- Country: Italy
- Language: Italian

The Mattei Affair (Italian: Il Caso Mattei) is a 1972 Italian drama film directed by Francesco Rosi. It depicts the life and mysterious death of Enrico Mattei, an Italian businessman who in the aftermath of World War II managed to avoid the sale of the nascent Italian oil and hydrocarbon industry to US companies and developed them in the Eni, a state-owned oil company which rivaled the "Seven Sisters" for oil and gas deals in Northern African and Middle Eastern countries.

The film shared the Grand Prix with The Working Class Goes to Heaven at the 1972 Cannes Film Festival. Italian star Gian Maria Volonté was the leading actor in both films.

The film is an innovative hybrid of documentary and fiction, representing Francesco Rosi's concept of cine-inchieste (film investigation). The flashback structure shows the influence of Citizen Kane and Rosi's Salvatore Giuliano (1962). Rosi remains faithful to his neo-realist roots with on-location shooting and non-professional actors. The main plot is interwoven with a fictionalized account of the director's own investigation into the death of his friend, the journalist Mauro De Mauro, who disappeared while doing research for the film. He was killed by the Sicilian Mafia, but like the death of Mattei, De Mauro's case was never solved.

In 2008, the film was included among the Italian Ministry of Cultural Heritage’s 100 Italian films to be saved, a list of 100 films that "have changed the collective memory of the country between 1942 and 1978."

== Synopsis ==
The film begins in 1962 with the recovery of the remains of Enrico Mattei, pilot Irnerio Bertuzzi, and American journalist William McHale, who crashed in Mattei's private plane in Bascapè, near Pavia, under unclear circumstances after a trip to Sicily. A flashback to 1945 reveals Mattei's appointment as commissioner of AGIP, tasked with selling it, but he defies orders and strengthens the company, making it a major European player. In 1970, filmmaker Francesco Rosi investigates Mattei's life, exploring political protection and a meeting with a U.S. oil magnate.

In 1960, Mattei, cunning yet brilliant, brokers a Soviet oil deal, challenging the dominance of Anglo-American oil trusts. He aims to offer better terms to Arab and African oil-producing nations, straining relations with the "seven sisters." The film then returns to 1970, when journalist Mauro De Mauro disappears. Authorities dismiss the Mattei connection, and the film recounts Mattei's final days in Sicily, including a crucial dinner and speech. In 1970, a suspect was arrested for De Mauro's disappearance, but journalists uncover a cover-up.

Rosi interviews experts suggesting Mafia sabotage or foreign intelligence involvement in Mattei's plane crash. Witnesses remain silent. The film concludes by revisiting the 1962 plane crash, connecting to the film's opening. Mattei's voice echoes his determination to challenge the oil monopoly worldwide.

== Cast ==
- Gian Maria Volonté - Enrico Mattei
- Luigi Squarzina - Journalist
- Furio Colombo - assistant
- Gianfranco Ombuen - Ing. Ferrari
- Edda Ferronao - Mrs. Mattei
- Accursio Di Leo - Sicilian important man #1
- Giuseppe Lo Presti - Sicilian important man #2
- Aldo Barberito - Journalist Mauro De Mauro
- Dario Michaelis - Carabinieri official
- Peter Baldwin - McHale (journalist)
- Franco Graziosi - Minister
- Elio Jotta - Head of commission
- Luciano Colitti - Bertuzzi
- Terenzio Cordova - Police official
- Camillo Milli - Change teller
- Jean Rougeul - American official
- Francesco Rosi - himself
