= Una storia semplice (novel) =

Short novel by Leonardo Sciascia

Una storia semplice (A Simple Story) is a short novel by Leonardo Sciascia. It was the last novel of the author to be published, shortly before his death. It is inspired by a real event, i.e. the theft of the Caravaggio Nativity with St. Francis and St. Lawrence, which happened in 1969. A film based on the novel was directed by Emidio Greco and released in 1991.

== English translations ==
Una storia semplice appeared as A Straightforward Tale in 1991, together with two other novels translated by Joseph Farrell, in the Carcanet The Knight and Death, & Other Stories volume. A slightly different edition later appeared at Harvill, The Knight and Death: Three Novellas (1992) and at Knopf (1992; republished by Vintage Books in 1993 as Open Doors and Three Novellas). The most recent edition appeared in 2003 at Granta, as part of The Knight and Death & One Way Another volume (republished in 2014). In 2010, a small London-based publisher, Hesperus Press, had the novel retranslated by Howard Curtis. It appeared – together with Candido – as A Simple Story.
