= A Pure Formality =

- DVD cover
- Directed by: Giuseppe Tornatore
- Written by: Giuseppe Tornatore; Pascal Quignard
- Produced by: Bruno Altissimi; Mario Cecchi Gori; Vittorio Cecchi Gori; Jean-Louis Livi; Alexandre Mnouchkine; Claudio Saraceni
- Starring: Gérard Depardieu; Roman Polanski
- Cinematography: Blasco Giurato
- Edited by: Giuseppe Tornatore
- Music by: Ennio Morricone
- Production companies: Cecchi Gori Group Tiger Cinematografica; DD Productions; Film Par Film; Orly Films; Sidonie; TF1 Films Production
- Distributed by: AFMD (1994, France); Penta Distribuzione (1994, Italy)
- Release dates: 15 May 1994 (Italy); 18 May 1994 (France); 12 January 1995 (Germany); 30 March 1995 (Spain)
- Running time: 111 minutes
- Countries: Italy; France
- Language: French

A Pure Formality (Italian: Una pura formalità) is a 1994 Italian-French drama thriller film directed by Giuseppe Tornatore, who also co-wrote the script with author Pascal Quignard. It stars Gérard Depardieu as a suspect and Roman Polanski as a police inspector. The story, which takes place over one night, centers on the interrogation of the former by the latter, pertaining to an initially unspecified crime.

== Plot ==
During a stormy night, in a remote and mountainous area, a gunshot is heard in a forest. A disoriented, rain-soaked man is then arrested and brought to the local, rundown police station.

The man, who has no identification documents and no memories of recent events, is interrogated by the police commissioner (station superintendent); he identifies himself as Onoff, a celebrated and famously reclusive writer. The commissioner, who turns out to be a literature enthusiast, is initially skeptical, as the man lacks Onoff's distinctive beard; he questions the detainee about Onoff's writings, and is ultimately satisfied that the man is indeed the famous author.

The commissioner eventually reveals that a murder has been committed and that Onoff is a suspect; he tries to establish events through careful interrogation and deduction, as Onoff contradicts himself multiple times. The two men verbally spar over the whole night; during a power outage caused by the weather, Onoff tries to escape but is recaptured after stepping into a wolf trap.

Onoff gradually recounts his life. He admits that much of his official biography has been invented and that his real name is Biagio Febbraio; his surname (February in Italian) comes from the fact that he was an abandoned child, found in February. He also acknowledges that he has been struggling with severe writer's block, eventually becoming unable to produce new books. His relationship with Paola, his secretary and lover, has deteriorated over time and they had an ugly spat the previous day.

Onoff ultimately comes to the realization that he is both the perpetrator and victim of the crime, having committed suicide earlier that evening, and that the police station is a supernatural place where he is being kept as part of his transition to the afterlife.

At dawn, Onoff quietly gets into a police truck. The commissioner, now friendly and courteous, congratulates him on the yet unpublished novel that he had completed just before dying.

== Cast ==
- Gérard Depardieu - Onoff
- Roman Polanski - Commissioner
- Sergio Rubini - Young officer
- Nicola Di Pinto - Captain
- Tano Cimarosa - Orderly
- Paolo Lombardi - Marshall
- Maria Rosa Spagnolo - Paola
- Massimo Vanni

== Production ==
An Italian-French coproduction, the film was made with 70% Italian financing. In the Italian-language version of the film, Gérard Depardieu and Roman Polanski were dubbed by Corrado Pani and Leo Gullotta, respectively. Interiors were shot at Cinecittà studios. Other scenes were filmed in rural areas of the Piedmont and Abruzzo regions of Italy; locations included Motta de' Conti and Santo Stefano di Sessanio.

The film's score, composed by Ennio Morricone, includes an end credits song performed by Gérard Depardieu.

== Reception ==
A Pure Formality competed as an Italian entry at the 1994 Cannes Film Festival, where it won no awards. It received a David di Donatello for Best Production Design (Andrea Crisanti).

Critical reception in Italy was mostly negative, though the film garnered positive feedback from some outlets, including Famiglia Cristiana and Il Giorno, who lauded the performances, suspenseful story, and Tornatore's directing choices. In France, Le Monde gave the film a mixed review, finding it theatrical and occasionnally meandering, but praising some of the atmosphere and the performances of Depardieu and Polanski. L'Express gave the film a positive review, finding it brilliant and "dantesque", whereas Télérama panned it, commenting that "everything rings false" and that the picture came as a major disappointment from the director of Cinema Paradiso.

Deborah Young of Variety found the film 'weird but fascinating". Despite her praise for the cinematography and the performances of Depardieu, Polanski, and Sergio Rubini as the commissioner's assistant, her overall review was mixed. She noted that "the puzzle at the heart of 'A Pure Formality' is basically intellectual, not criminal, and some viewers may find their interest flagging as the interrogation drags on and the literary angst takes over", although the final plot twist was likely to recaptivate audiences. Time Out called the picture a "stagey two-hander" depending heavily on its two leads for effect, though their performances couldn't "distract from the ludicrous contrivance of the film's threadbare central conceit". On review aggregator website Rotten Tomatoes, the film holds an approval rating of 80% based on 5 reviews, with an average rating of 6.9/10.

The film was commercially unsuccessful, both in Italy and in France. It received limited theatrical distribution in the United States, where it made $190,749 at the box office.

Tornatore later said that the film's poor reception had prompted him to begin production on his next one, The Star Maker, as soon as he could.

== Home video ==
A Pure Formality has been released on DVD and Blu-Ray, and on streaming services including Amazon Prime.
