= Silver Spoon Set =

1960 Italian film

- DVD
- Directed by: Francesco Maselli
- Written by: Ennio De Concini; Francesco Maselli
- Produced by: Franco Cristaldi
- Starring: Claudia Cardinale; Gérard Blain; Tomas Milian; Betsy Blair; Sergio Fantoni
- Cinematography: Gianni Di Venanzo
- Edited by: Ruggero Mastroianni
- Music by: Giovanni Fusco
- Distributed by: Les Films Ariane; Lux Film
- Release date: 5 October 1960
- Countries: Italy; France
- Language: Italian

Silver Spoon Set (Italian: I Delfini, lit. 'The Dolphins') is a 1960 Italian–French drama film directed by Francesco Maselli. It features an ensemble cast including Claudia Cardinale, Tomas Milian, Betsy Blair and Gérard Blain.

== Plot ==
The story takes place in an unnamed city of central Italy and follows a group of twentysomething friends, some of them from aristocratic families and mostly children of local wealthy industrialists; they are nicknamed the "dolphins" after the heir apparent to the throne of France. As the girls wait for marriage and the boys wait to start working in the family businesses, they stave off their boredom in parties and idle activities. The group includes Anselmo, the film's voice-over narrator and an aspiring artist who yearns to escape his milieu; the arrogant Alberto; Elsa, Anselmo's uninhibited sister; and Margherita Cherè, generally called just "Cherè", a somewhat older noblewoman who acts as their informal leader. During one of their parties, Marina, Anselmo's girlfriend, gets sick after drinking too much. This leads the group to meet Mario, the city's new doctor.

Cherè finds Mario attractive and invites him to one of their next parties. When Mario comes over with his girlfriend Fedora - his lodger's daughter - Alberto bets on a whim that he can steal her from him. Fedora, a lower-class girl who had always looked up to the wealthier youngsters, immediately allows herself to be seduced.

Mario, wounded in his pride, finds solace in a brief affair with Cherè. Fedora, who has been living hand to mouth with her mother since her father abandoned the family home, sees the advantages of being with the affluent Alberto; however, their relationship turns sour as his deep character flaws become obvious. She considers leaving him, but Alberto nastily reminds her that given her social position in such a small city, this would mean ruining her life as no man would be willing to take her any more. When Fedora becomes pregnant, their relationship worsens as Alberto believes she has deliberately set him up. Cherè, who seems to be looking for sources of income, considers marrying Ridolfi, an unscrupulous businessman. But Ridolfi ends up dating the younger and prettier Elsa, who accepts his advances out of boredom.

One night, Cherè gives a farewell party at her home as she prepares to leave town. Her friends unwittingly discover that she is broke, with her family home being repossessed, and that she is leaving just to avoid public disgrace: they do not hide their contempt for her. Mario, who is also present, gets into a fight with Alberto and beats him up. He declares his love to Fedora and proposes marriage to her. Fedora leaves with Mario, but laters reconsiders her decision after she sees her mother crying. The next day, when they all meet at the usual bar, Fedora abandons Mario and rejoins Alberto.

Later on, several members of the group end up marrying each other. Fedora marries Alberto; Anselmo marries Marina, gives up on his dreams of being an artist and starts working at his father's factory.

== Cast ==
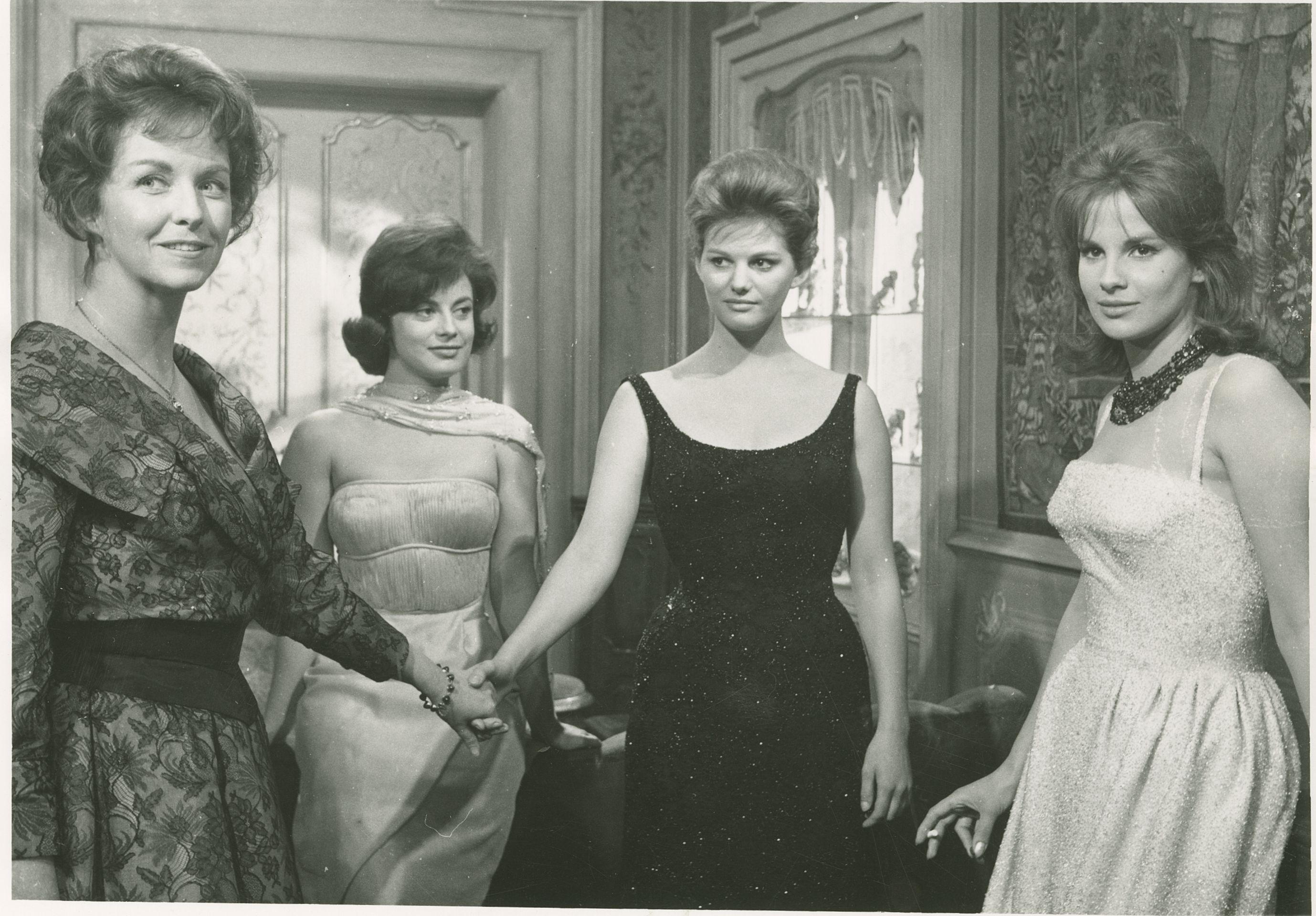
Actresses Betsy Blair, Anna Maria Ferrero, Claudia Cardinale and Antonella Lualdi in a scene from the film.

- Claudia Cardinale as Fedora Santini
- Gérard Blain as Anselmo Foresi
- Betsy Blair as Countess Margherita Cherè
- Sergio Fantoni as Dr. Mario Corsi
- Tomas Milian as Alberto De Matteis
- Anna Maria Ferrero as Marina
- Claudio Gora as Ridolfi
- Antonella Lualdi as Elsa Foresi
- Enzo Garinei as Guglielmo Bodoni
- Tina Lattanzi as Alberto's Mother
- Nora Bellinzaghi as Fedora's Mother
- Achille Majeroni as Old Actor
- Lydia Alfonsi as Young Actress

== Production ==
Principal photography took place essentially in Ascoli Piceno with some interiors being shot in Rome.

== Censorship ==
When I Delfini was first released in Italy in 1960 the Committee for the Theatrical Review of the Italian Ministry of Cultural Heritage and Activities rated the film as suitable for people 16 years and older. In order for the film to be screened publicly, the Committee recommended the removal of the scene where Alberto and Fedora are seen kissing in bed, because the kiss was considered excessively lustful. The reason for the age restriction, cited in the official documents, is that the subject and the scenes of the movie were considered inappropriate to the sensitivity of a minor.

== Restoration ==
The film was restored in 1998 by Cristaldifilm and the Centro Sperimentale di Cinematografia as part of Adotta un film - 100 film da salvare, a government-sponsored program aimed at preserving culturally significant Italian films.
