= P. M. Pasinetti =

Italian writer

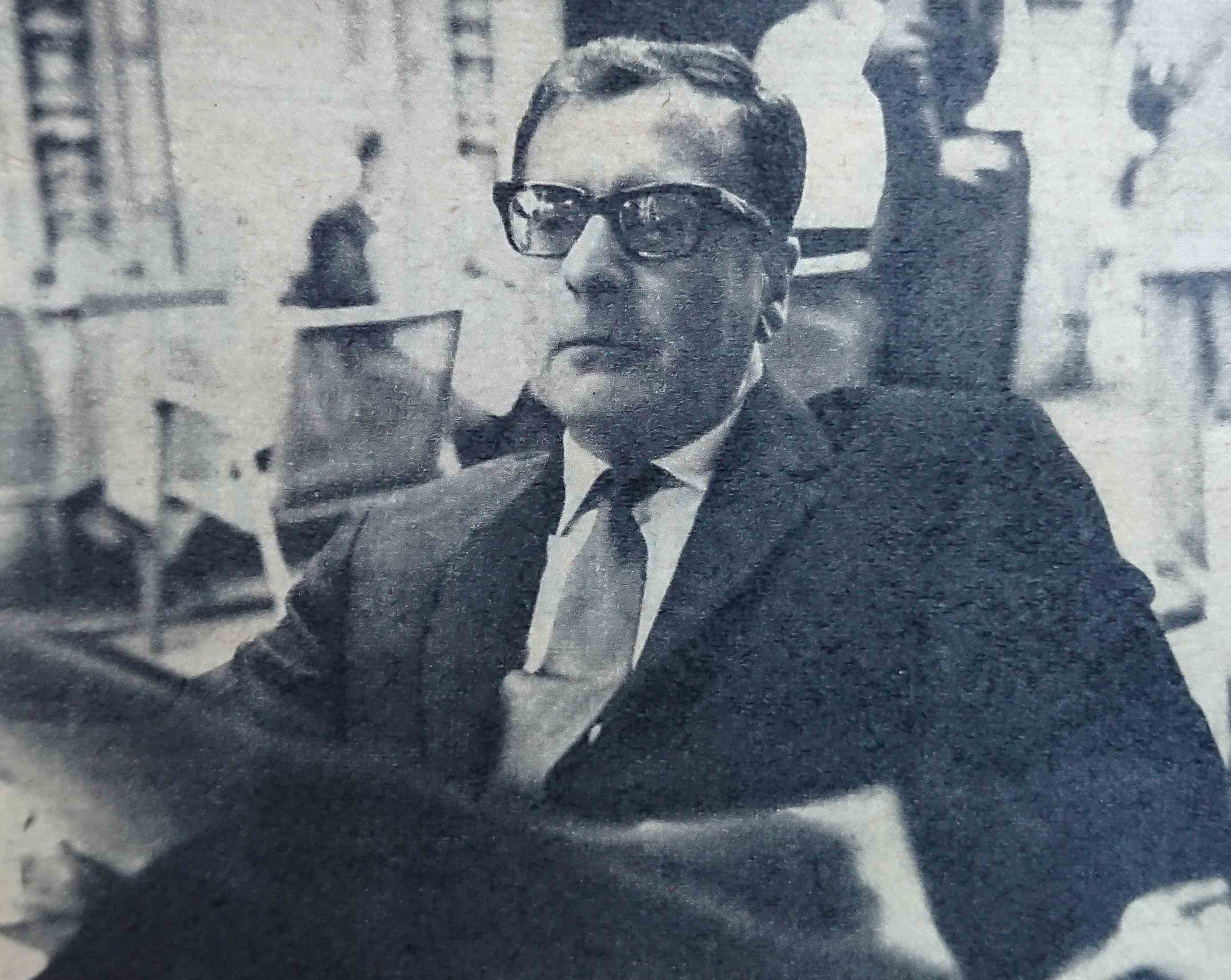
Pier Maria Pasinetti.

Pier Maria (P.M.) Pasinetti (24 June 1913 Italy – 8 July 2006) was an Italian-American novelist, professor and journalist. The Italian director Francesco Pasinetti was his older brother.

== Biography ==
Borin in Venice, Pasinetti went to the United States in 1935 to study literature and writing. He spent some time at the Louisiana State University and developed a friendship with "Southern Fellowship" poet and writer Robert Penn Warren.

Pasinetti’s first published fiction in English appeared in the Southern Review. He had been publishing journalism pieces in Italy since the age of eighteen. His first book, three novellas, was published in 1942. During World War II, he held lectureships in Goettingen, in lower Germany, and in Stockholm.

After the war Pasinetti returned to the United States in 1946, teaching briefly at Bennington College. He studied with René Wellek and earned a doctorate in comparative literature (the first ever awarded) from Yale University. In 1949, he accepted a professorship in comparative literature and Italian at UCLA. Until his death in 2006, Pasinetti divided his time between Venice, Italy and Beverly Hills, California.

He died at Venice in 2006.

== Work ==
Pasinetti was a corresponding journalist for Il Corriere della Sera (1960s-1990s), writing the column "Dall'estrema America" ("From Farthest America"). His novels include: Rosso veneziano or Venetian Red (1957), Il ponte dell'Accademia or From the Academy Bridge (1968), Melodramma or Melodrama (1993). Pasinetti helped found the Comparative Literature Department at UCLA. He was active as a scholar well into his 90s.

Pasinetti taught both comparative literature and Italian at the University of California at Los Angeles for over 40 years. He was a founding editor with Yale's Maynard Mack of the Norton Anthology of World Masterpieces. W.W. Norton & Company has been publishing this standard college text since the mid-1970s. Pasinetti's companion essays include those on Erasmus' "In Praise of Folly" and Machievelli's The Prince. Pasinetti also edited both the first and second editions of Norton's new "global" Anthology of World Literature.

Pasinetti served as a technical advisor for Joseph L. Mankiewicz's film Julius Caesar. Also produced in 1953, but in Italy, was Michelangelo Antonioni's film La signora senza camelie; Pasinetti wrote the screenplay with Antonioni, who was related to him by marriage. In this film, he also appears among the group of guests waiting for the arrival of the actress Clara Manni (Lucia Bosè) at a private house. In 1973, Pasinetti played a small acting part in Francesco Rosi's Lucky Luciano.
