= The Death of Mario Ricci =

1983 film

- Film poster
- Directed by: Claude Goretta
- Written by: Claude Goretta; Georges Haldas
- Produced by: Norbert Chalon
- Starring: Gian Maria Volonté
- Cinematography: Hans Liechti
- Edited by: Joële Van Effenterre
- Release date: May 1983
- Running time: 100 minutes
- Countries: Switzerland; France
- Language: French

The Death of Mario Ricci (French: La mort de Mario Ricci) is a 1983 Swiss-French drama film directed by Claude Goretta. It was entered into the 1983 Cannes Film Festival where Gian Maria Volonté won the award for Best Actor.

== Cast ==
- Gian Maria Volonté - Bernard Fontana
- Magali Noël - Solange
- Heinz Bennent - Henri Kremer
- Mimsy Farmer - Cathy Burns
- Jean-Michel Dupuis - Didier Meylan
- Michel Robin - Fernand Blondel
- Lucas Belvaux - Stephane Coutaz
- Claudio Caramaschi - Giuseppe Cardetti
- Roger Jendly - Francis
- Bernard-Pierre Donnadieu - Jacky Vermot
- Michel Cassagne - Armand Barbezat
- Michael Hinz - Otto Schmidhauser
- Marblum Jequier - Odette Simonet
- Jean-Claude Perrin - Edgar Simonet
- André Schmidt - Maurice Coutaz
