= News from the Excavations =

- Directed by: Emidio Greco
- Starring: Giuseppe Battiston; Ambra Angiolini
- Cinematography: Marco Sperduti
- Music by: Luis Enriquez Bacalov
- Release date: 2010
- Running time: 89 minutes
- Country: Italy

News from the Excavations (Italian: Notizie degli scavi) is a 2010 Italian drama film directed by Emidio Greco. It is based on the novel with the same name written by Franco Lucentini. It premiered, out of competition, at the 67th Venice International Film Festival. The film was awarded with two Globi D'Oro for best director and for best screenplay.

== Cast ==
- Giuseppe Battiston as the Professor
- Ambra Angiolini as the Marquis
- Iaia Forte as the Lady
- Giorgia Salari as Lea
