= Ehrengard =

1982 film by Emidio Greco

- Directed by: Emidio Greco
- Starring: Jean Pierre Cassel
- Cinematography: Giuseppe Lanci
- Music by: Wolfgang Amadeus Mozart
- Release date: 1982
- Country: Italy

Ehrengard is a 1982 Italian drama film directed by Emidio Greco. It is based on the novel with the same name written by Karen Blixen. It premiered at the 1982 Venice International Film Festival. However, due to the bankruptcy of the producers, it was not released theatrically until 2002.

== Cast ==
- Jean Pierre Cassel: Cazotte
- Audrey Matson: Ehrengard
- Lea Padovani: Granduchessa
- Christian Borromeo: Lotario
- Alessandro Haber: Matthias
- Caterina Boratto: Countess von Gassner

== See also ==
- List of Italian films of 1982
