= The Palermo Connection =

- Directed by: Francesco Rosi
- Written by: Francesco Rosi; Gore Vidal; Tonino Guerra
- Based on: Oublier Palerme by Edmonde Charle-Roux
- Produced by: Mario Cecchi Gori; Vittorio Cecchi Gori
- Starring: Jim Belushi; Mimi Rogers; Joss Ackland; Vittorio Gassman; Philippe Noiret
- Cinematography: Pasqualino De Santis
- Edited by: Ruggero Mastroianni
- Music by: Ennio Morricone
- Production companies: Cecchi Gori Group; Reteitalia; Gaumont
- Distributed by: Penta Film (Italy); Gaumont Distribution (France)
- Release date: 1990
- Running time: 100 minutes
- Countries: Italy; France
- Languages: English; Italian
- Box office: $197,000 (Italy)

Dimenticare Palermo (Forgetting Palermo) is a 1990 Italian political thriller film starring Jim Belushi, directed by Francesco Rosi and co-written by Gore Vidal. The film was released under the title The Palermo Connection in North America. The script is based on the Prix Goncourt winning novel Oublier Palerme (1966) by French author Edmonde Charles-Roux.

== Plot ==
Carmine Bonavia is candidate for mayor of New York City on the issue of drug legalization. During the campaign he gets married and travels to his ancestral home of Sicily, for the honeymoon. In the hotel in Palermo he meets a Sicilian prince who has been confined there for years because he crossed the mafia. He discovers the beauties of the Italian island but is also framed by men of power, for a crime he did not commit. He discovers that those men will stop at nothing to prevent the legalization of drugs, which threatens their business, and is forced to decide between joining them or going to prison.

== Cast ==
- James Belushi: Carmine Bonavia
- Mimi Rogers: Carrie
- Joss Ackland: the boss
- Vittorio Gassman: the 'Prince'
- Philippe Noiret: Gianni Mucci
- Carolina Rosi: the Italian journalist
- Beatrice Ring: the German student
- Marco Leonardi: the florist
- Marino Masé
- Sal Borgese
