= Gianni Di Venanzo =

Italian cinematographer

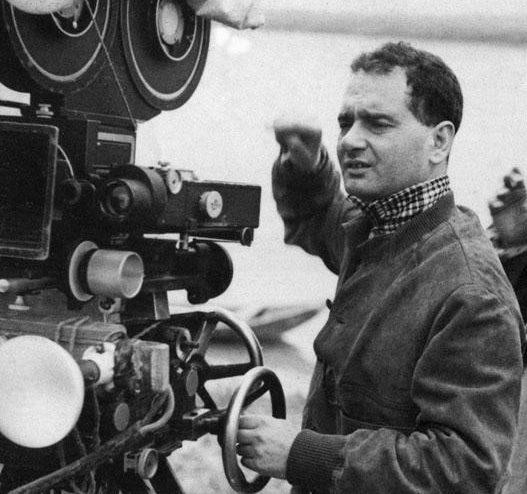
Gianni Di Venanzo

Gianni Di Venanzo (18 December 1920, Teramo, Abruzzo – 3 February 1966, Rome) was an Italian cinematographer.

Di Venanzo was one of the leading Italian post-war cinematographers with the unique distinction to be part of the neo-realist, post neo-realist and modern schools in Italian Cinema. He collaborated with several notable directors, working on Michelangelo Antonioni's L'amore in città (Love in the City), Le Amiche (The Girlfriends), Il Grido (The Outcry), La Notte (Night) and L'Eclisse (The Eclipse), Francesco Rosi's La sfida (The Challenge), I Magliari (The Magliari), Salvatore Giuliano, Le mani sulla città (Hands Over the City), and Il momento della verità (The Moment of Truth), Federico Fellini's 8½ and Giulietta degli spiriti (Juliet of the Spirits) and Joseph Losey's Eva. His last film was Joseph L. Mankiewicz's The Honey Pot (1967).

His work with Michelangelo Antonioni, Francesco Rosi and Federico Fellini made him one of the leading European masters of the camera of the middle part of the century.

His career was cut short when he died in Rome of viral hepatitis at the age of 45.

== Selected filmography ==
- The Captain of Venice (1951)
- At the Edge of the City (1953)
- Women and Soldiers (1954)
- Sunset in Naples (1955)
- Big Deal on Madonna Street (1958)
- Silver Spoon Set (1960)
- Il carabiniere a cavallo (1961)
- Bebo's Girl (1963)
- Time of Indifference (1964)
- The 10th Victim (1965)
