= Salvatore Giuliano (film) =

1962 Italian film

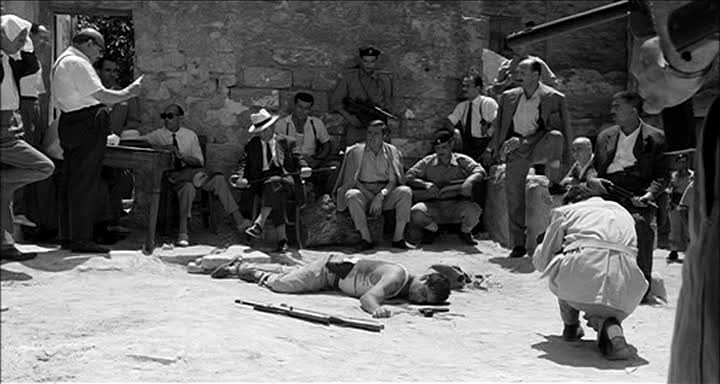
- Opening scene of Salvatore Giuliano
- Directed by: Francesco Rosi
- Screenplay by: Francesco Rosi; Suso Cecchi d'Amico; Enzo Provenzale; Franco Solinas
- Produced by: Franco Cristaldi
- Starring: Salvo Randone; Frank Wolff
- Cinematography: Gianni Di Venanzo
- Edited by: Mario Serandrei
- Music by: Piero Piccioni
- Production companies: Lux Film; Vides Cinematografica; Galatea Film
- Distributed by: Lux Film
- Release date: 28 February 1962 (Italy)
- Running time: 123 minutes
- Country: Italy
- Languages: Italian; Sicilian

Salvatore Giuliano is a 1962 Italian drama film directed by Francesco Rosi. Using techniques of the documentary film, it recounts the criminal career of famous Sicilian bandit Salvatore Giuliano between 1943 and his death in 1950. In 2008, the film was included in the Italian Ministry of Cultural Heritage's 100 Italian films to be saved, a list of 100 films that "have changed the collective memory of the country between 1942 and 1978."

== Plot ==
In 1950, Sicilian bandit Salvatore Giuliano is found dead in the courtyard of a rural village. According to the authorities' official announcement, Giuliano was killed in a shooting with the carabinieri. However, when asked by reporters some locals recall that they first heard three single gunshots and much later the report of a submachine gun.

In a series of nonlinear flashbacks dating to 1943, the film recounts Giuliano's criminal career, starting with him shooting a policeman. In 1945, Giuliano's gang is officially declared part of the military arm of the growing separatist party MIS fighting for Sicily's independence. The separatist movement is supported by the Allied Forces and the Sicilian Mafia. After the 1946 declaration of Sicily's autonomous status within the Italian state, MIS' former militant members are granted amnesty, but Giuliano proceeds with his illegal activities, entangled in kidnappings and blackmail. While still adored by the local people at first, his popularity wanes after the 1947 Portella della Ginestra massacre, where a force he has raised of his gang of mounted cavalry and conscripted local shepherds turned riflemen descends a May 1st gathering of supporters of the Italian Communist and Italian Socialist parties and murders eleven marchers. One after one, his confidants either are betrayed or cooperate with the police and turn informant. During a set-up backed by top carabinieri, Giualiano is shot in his bed by his right-hand man, Gaspare Pisciotta. Afterwards, the carabinieri, who had been waiting outside as backup, stage Giualiano's a death as having occurred during a shootout.

In a trial of massacre participants two years later, informant testimony sways the court and the voluntary participants are convicted and sentenced to life in prison, while the conscripts are acquitted. No action was taken on Pisciotta's charges that the Mafia and members of the authorities had given Giuliano the order for the massacre to put down the populist uprising. Over his loud protests he gets life as well.

In 1954, Pisciotta is poisoned in prison, with the complicity of the guards and a gang member he betrayed. The film ends with the shooting of a Mafia Mafia Don, the pentito who had served as intermediary with the carabinienari, in a public square in 1960.

== Cast ==
- Salvo Randone as President of Viterbo Assize Court
- Frank Wolff as Gaspare Pisciotta
- Pietro Cammarata as Salvatore Giuliano
- Sennuccio Benelli as Reporter
- Giuseppe Calandra as Minor Official
- Max Cartier as Francesco
- Fernando Cicero as Bandit
- Bruno Ukmar as Spy
- Cosimo Torino as Frank Mannino
- Federico Zardi as Pisciotta's Defense Counsel
- Francesco Rosi (narration)

== Production ==
After having been denied public funding, Salvatore Giuliano was produced by Franco Cristaldi with funding by the Banca Nazionale del Lavoro. Filming took place in 1961 at the locations of the actual events in Sicily, using mostly local non-professionals as actors.

Although the titular character of the film, Giuliano himself is seen only briefly, either as a dead man after his killing, or as an indistinct figure. By these means, Rosi (in the words of critic Michel Ciment) stressed his rejection of identification with his subject.

== Reception ==
Although it was denied the entry to the Venice Film Festival, Salvatore Giuliano was received well by Italian critics and audiences, was awarded numerous national film prizes and reached number ten in the list of the most successful Italian films of 1962.

While it received a Silver Bear at the 12th Berlin International Film Festival and was titled "a major Italian film" by the critic of weekly German newspaper Die Zeit, the reaction of New York Times critic Howard Thompson upon the film's 1964 New York premiere was reserved, titling it "a curiously disjointed drama with a superbly imaginative camera eye."

In later years, critics' opinions of the film were unanimously positive. In 2001 The Guardian/s Derek Malcolm called it "almost certainly the best film about the social and political forces that have shaped Sicily". In 2004, Terrence Rafferty of The New York Times acclaimed it an "exciting piece of filmmaking". In 2013, Michael Sragow of The New Yorker applauded Francesco Rossi as a "bravura director" and "inspired innovator".. Trevor Johnston of Time Out Film Guide lauded it in 2014 as "a landmark in political cinema".

Film historian Gino Moliterno argued in 2003 that "Rosi's highly original strategy in this landmark film is to aim at neither an "objective" journalistic documentary nor a fictional recreation but to employ as wide a range of disparate formal and stylistic elements as necessary to conduct a committed search for the truth that becomes, in a sense, its own narrative."

Director Martin Scorsese cited Salvatore Giuliano in 2013 as one of his twelve favorite films of all time.

== Awards ==
- Silver Bear for Best Director, 12th Berlin International Film Festival, 1962
- Grolla d'oro for Best Director, 1962
- Globo d'oro for Best Film, 1962
- Nastro d'argento for Best Director, Best Black-and-white Cinematography and Best Score, 1963

== See also ==
- Salvatore Giuliano, a 1986 Italian opera by Lorenzo Ferrero
- The Sicilian, a novel by Mario Puzo based on the life of Salvatore Giuliano
- The Sicilian, a film based on Puzo's novel, directed by Michael Cimino

== Bibliography ==
- Gesù Sebastiano (a cura di), Francesco Rosi, Giuseppe Maimone Editore, Catania 1993
- Kezich Tullio e Sebastiano Gesù (a cura di), Salvatore Giuliano, Giuseppe Maimone Editore, Catania 1993
- Annarita Curcio, Salvatore Giuliano: una parabola storica, https://www.doppiozero.com/materiali/salvatore-giuliano-una-parabola-storica
