= Pasqualino De Santis =

Italian cinematographer (1927–1996)

- Born: Pasquale De Santis; 24 April 1927; Fondi, Italy
- Died: 23 June 1996 (aged 69); Lviv, Ukraine
- Education: Centro Sperimentale di Cinematografia
- Occupation: Cinematographer
- Years active: 1950–1996
- Relatives: Giuseppe De Santis (brother)
- Awards: Academy Award for Best Cinematography; 1968 Romeo and Juliet; BAFTA Award for Best Cinematography; 1971 Death in Venice

Pasquale "Pasqualino" De Santis (24 April 1927 – 23 June 1996) was an Italian cinematographer.

== Biography ==
Born in Fondi, he was the brother of film director Giuseppe De Santis. They worked together in Non c'è pace tra gli ulivi, Uomini e lupi (1956), La strada lunga un anno (1958) and La garçonnière (1960).

He collaborated with Francesco Rosi in C'era una volta (1967), Uomini contro (1970), Il caso Mattei (1972), Lucky Luciano (1974), Cristo si è fermato a Eboli (1979), Tre fratelli (1981), Carmen (1984), Cronaca di una morte annunciata (1987), Diario napoletano (1992) and La tregua (1996), filmed in Ukraine, where he died.

He worked with Luchino Visconti (La caduta degli dei, 1969; Death in Venice, 1971; Conversation Piece, 1974; L'Innocente, 1976), Federico Fellini (Fellini: A Director's Notebook, 1969), Joseph L. Mankiewicz (The Honey Pot, 1966), Vittorio De Sica (Amanti, 1968), Joseph Losey (The Assassination of Trotsky, 1972), Carlo Lizzani (Torino nera, 1972), Robert Bresson (Lancelot du Lac, 1974; Le diable probablement, 1977; L'Argent, 1982), Ettore Scola (A Special Day, 1977; La terrazza, 1980), Giuliano Montaldo (Marco Polo, 1982).

== Awards and nominations ==
=== Academy Awards ===
| Year | Nominated work | Category | Result |
|---|---|---|---|
| 1969 | Romeo and Juliet | Best Cinematography | Won |

=== British Academy Film Awards ===
| Year | Nominated work | Category | Result |
|---|---|---|---|
| 1972 | Death in Venice | Best Cinematography | Won |

=== Primetime Emmy Award ===
| Year | Nominated work | Category | Result |
|---|---|---|---|
| 1982 | Marco Polo | Best Cinematography | Nominated |

=== César Awards ===
| Year | Nominated work | Category | Result |
|---|---|---|---|
| 1985 | Carmen | Best Cinematography | Nominated |
| 1986 | Harem | Best Cinematography | Nominated |

=== David di Donatello ===
| Year | Nominated work | Category | Result |
|---|---|---|---|
| 1981 | Three Brothers | Best Cinematography | Won |
| 1985 | Carmen | Best Cinematography | Won |
| 1990 | The Palermo Connection | Best Cinematography | Nominated |
| 1997 | The Truce | Best Cinematography | Nominated |

=== Golden Ciak Awards ===
| Year | Nominated work | Category | Result |
|---|---|---|---|
| 1990 | The Palermo Connection | Best Cinematography | Nominated |

=== Globo d'oro ===
| Year | Nominated work | Category | Result | Ref |
|---|---|---|---|---|
| 1997 | The Truce | Best Cinematography | Nominated | |

=== Nastro d'Argento ===
| Year | Nominated work | Category | Result |
|---|---|---|---|
| 1968 | More Than a Miracle | Best Cinematography | Nominated |
| 1969 | Romeo and Juliet | Best Cinematography | Won |
| 1970 | The Damned | Best Cinematography | Nominated |
| 1972 | Death in Venice | Best Cinematography | Won |
| 1974 | Lucky Luciano | Best Cinematography | Nominated |
| 1975 | Conversation Piece | Best Cinematography | Won |
| 1981 | Three Brothers | Best Cinematography | Won |
| 1987 | Chronicle of a Death Foretold | Best Cinematography | Nominated |
| 1998 | The Truce | Best Cinematography | Nominated |

=== Laurel Awards ===
| Year | Nominated work | Category | Result |
|---|---|---|---|
| 1970 | Romeo and Juliet | Best Cinematography | Nominated |
