= Three Brothers (1981 film) =

- Film poster
- Directed by: Francesco Rosi
- Written by: Tonino Guerra; Francesco Rosi
- Produced by: Giorgio Nocella; Antonio Macrì
- Starring: Philippe Noiret; Michele Placido
- Cinematography: Pasqualino De Santis
- Edited by: Ruggero Mastroianni
- Music by: Pino Daniele; Piero Piccioni
- Production companies: Iter Film; Gaumont
- Distributed by: Gaumont Distribution
- Release date: 15 May 1981 (France)
- Running time: 113 minutes
- Countries: Italy; France
- Language: Italian

Three Brothers (Italian: Tre fratelli) is a 1981 Italian film based on a work by Russian author Andrei Platonov. It was directed by Francesco Rosi and stars Philippe Noiret, Vittorio Mezzogiorno, Michele Placido and Charles Vanel.

The film won the Boston Society of Film Critics award for Best Foreign Film, and the Nastro d'Argento for Best Director and Actor. It received a nomination for an Academy Award for Best Foreign Language Film. It was screened out of competition at the 1981 Cannes Film Festival.

== Plot ==
An elderly woman, the matriarch of an Italian family, dies on a farm in Southern Italy. Her husband, Donato, summons their three adult children from the cities where they now reside, bringing them back to the farm where each grapples with challenging personal dilemmas. Raffaele, one of the sons and a judge in Rome, contemplates presiding over a terrorism trial, exposing himself to the danger of an attack. Another son, Rocco, resides in Naples, devout and working as an educator in a youth detention center, driven by his desire to assist troubled youth. Nicola, the third son, lives in Turin and works as a militant factory worker embroiled in a labor dispute while navigating a troubled marriage.

Each man copes with his grief in his unique manner while simultaneously confronting other emotional hurdles. The sons reflect on the past and envision the future; Raffaele grapples with visions of his downfall, Rocco dreams of rescuing Naples' youth from crime, drugs, and corruption, and Nicola seeks solace in the embrace of his estranged wife. As they collectively mourn, Donato and his young granddaughter, Nicola's child, delve into the rhythms of farm life.

== Cast ==
- Philippe Noiret - Raffaele Giuranna
- Michele Placido - Nicola Giuranna
- Vittorio Mezzogiorno - Rocco Giuranna and young Donato
- Andréa Ferréol - Raffaele's wife
- Maddalena Crippa - Giovanna
- Rosaria Tafuri - Rosaria
- Marta Zoffoli - Marta
- Tino Schirinzi - Raffaele's friend
- Simonetta Stefanelli - young Donato's wife
- Pietro Biondi - first judge
- Charles Vanel - Donato Giuranna
- Accursio Di Leo - first friend at bar
- Luigi Infantino - second friend at bar
- Girolamo Marzano - Nicola's friend
- Gina Pontrelli - the brothers' mother

== Reception ==
Three Brothers has an approval rating of 100% on review aggregator website Rotten Tomatoes, based on 5 reviews, and an average rating of 7.5/10.

== See also ==
- List of submissions to the 54th Academy Awards for Best Foreign Language Film
- List of Italian submissions for the Academy Award for Best Foreign Language Film
