= Raffaele La Capria =

Italian novelist and screenwriter (1922–2022)

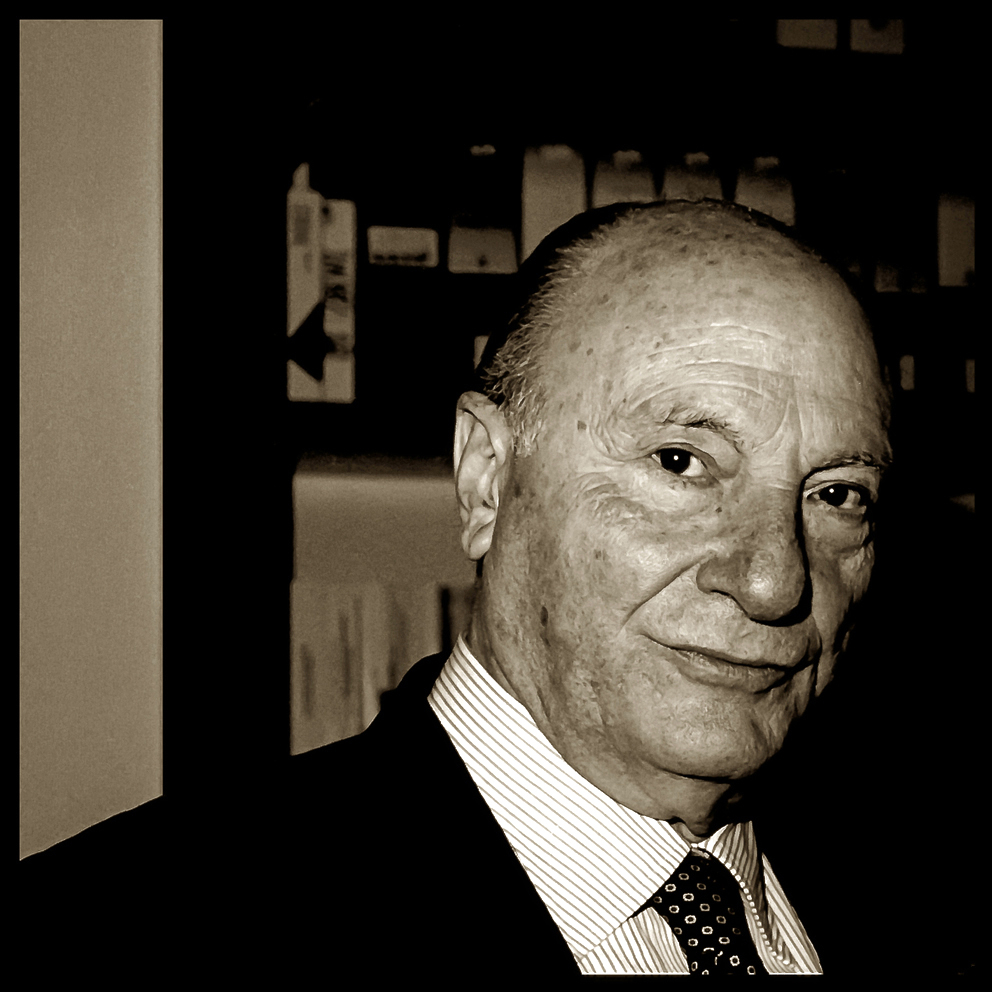
- Raffaele La Capria photographed by Augusto De Luca
- Born: 3 October 1922; Naples, Kingdom of Italy
- Died: 26 June 2022 (aged 99); Rome, Italy
- Occupations: Novelist; screenwriter
- Writing career
- Notable awards: Strega Prize; 1961; Premio Campiello; 2001 Lifetime Achievement; Viareggio Prize; 2005

Raffaele La Capria (3 October 1922 – 26 June 2022) was an Italian novelist and screenwriter.

His second novel, Ferito a morte (Mortal Wound), won Italy's most prestigious literary award, the Strega Prize, and is today considered a classic of Italian literature. Sandro Veronesi referred to it as "the best Italian novel of all time".

== Biography ==
La Capria was born in Naples, where he was to spend the formative years of his life. There he graduated in law, before staying in France, England, and the United States and then settling in Rome. He contributed to the cultural pages of the Corriere della Sera and was co-director of the literary journal Nuovi Argomenti. A particular interest was English poetry of the 1930s: as well as writing numerous articles he translated works including T. S. Eliot's Four Quartets. In the 1950s he wrote and produced a number of radio programmes for RAI on foreign contemporary drama. In 1957 La Capria was invited to participate in the International Seminar of Literature at Harvard University. In 1961 his novel Ferito a morte won the prestigious literary award Strega Prize.

La Capria worked as co-scriptwriter on a number of Francesco Rosi's films, including Le mani sulla città (1963), Uomini contro (1970), and Cristo si è fermato a Eboli (1979). In September 2001 he received a Premio Campiello lifetime achievement award and in 2005 L'estro quotidiano was selected as the winner of the Viareggio Prize for fiction.

La Capria was the widower of the actress Ilaria Occhini. He died in Rome on 26 June 2022, at the age of 99.

== Bibliography ==
- Un giorno d'impazienza, Milano-Roma, Bompiani, 1952; 1976.
  - (EN) A Day of impatience / First Affair, translated by William Weaver, Signet Books – New American Library, New York, 1955.
- Ferito a morte, Milano, Bompiani, 1961. (Strega Prize)
  - (EN) Mortal Wound, translated by Marguerite Waldman, Farrar, Straus And Company, 1964.
- La finestra. Sceneggiatura televisiva, con Mario Soldati, in "Sipario", a. 18, n. 202, 1963, p. 59–69.
- Amore e psiche, Milano, Bompiani, 1973. (Premio Campiello)
- Colapesce. Favola italiana, raccontata da, Milano, A. Mondadori, 1974.
- False partenze. Frammenti per una biografia letteraria, Milano, Bompiani, 1974.
- Variazioni sopra una nota sola, Roma, Cooperativa scrittori, 1977.
- Fiori giapponesi, Milano, Bompiani, 1978.
- In Lucania con Carlo Levi, con Saverio Strati, fotografia di Mario Carbone, commento di Gino Melchiorre, Cosenza, Lerici, 1979.
- Il bambino che non volle sparire, Teramo, Lisciani & Giunti, 1980.
- Tre romanzi di una giornata, Torino, Einaudi, 1982. ISBN 88-06-05383-3. [contiene: Un giorno d'impazienza; Ferito a morte; Amore e psiche]
- Il genio, con Damiano Damiani, in "Sipario", a. 38, n. 440, 1984, p. 99–114. [Da Il re ferito un prologo e due tempi di Damiano Damiani]
- L'armonia perduta, Milano, A. Mondadori, 1986. (Premio Napoli)
- Una visita alla centrale nucleare, con un'acquaforte di Franco Bassignani, Brescia, L'obliquo, 1987.
- La neve del Vesuvio, Milano, A. Mondadori, 1988. ISBN 88-04-31400-1. (Premio Grinzane Cavour)
- Letteratura e salti mortali, postfazione di Alfonso Berardinelli, Milano, A. Mondadori, 1990. ISBN 88-04-34212-9.
- Capri e non più Capri, Milano, A. Mondadori, 1991. ISBN 88-04-34559-4, (Premio Nazionale Rhegium Julii).
  - (EN) Capri and No Longer Capri, Thunder's Mouth Press, United States, 2017. ISBN 9781560255031.
- L'occhio di Napoli, Milano, A. Mondadori, 1994. ISBN 88-04-37910-3. (Premio Società dei Lettori, Lucca-Roma)
- Conversazione con Raffaele La Capria. Letteratura e sentimento del tempo, con Paola Gaglianone, saggio critico di Raffaele Manica, Roma, Omicron, 1995. ISBN 88-86680-03-1.
- L'apprendista scrittore, a cura di Stefania Brazzoduro, Roma, minimum fax, 1996. ISBN 88-86568-10-X.
- La mosca nella bottiglia. Elogio del senso comune, Milano, Rizzoli, 1996. ISBN 88-17-66067-1.
- Il sentimento della letteratura, Milano, Mondadori, 1997. ISBN 88-04-42275-0.
- Campania. Immagini del XIX secolo dagli archivi Alinari, Firenze, Alinari, 1997. ISBN 88-7292-204-6.
- Napolitan graffiti. Come eravamo, Milano, Rizzoli, 1998. ISBN 88-17-66096-5.
- Letteratura e libertà. Colloquio di Emanuele Trevi con Raffaele La Capria, Roma, Liberal, 1999.
- Ultimi viaggi nell'Italia perduta, Cava de' Tirreni, Avagliano, 1999. ISBN 88-8309-023-3.
- Lo stile dell'anatra, Milano, Mondadori, 2001. ISBN 88-04-48816-6.
- Cinquant'anni di false partenze ovvero L'apprendista scrittore, introduzione di Raffaele Manica, con un omaggio di Alfonso Berardinelli, Roma, minimum fax, 2002. ISBN 88-87765-63-4.
- Me visto da lui stesso. Interviste 1970–2001 sul mestiere di scrivere, a cura di Silvio Perrella, Lecce, Manni, 2002. ISBN 88-8176-274-9.
- Guappo e altri animali, disegni di Giosetta Fioroni, Lugo, Associazione Culturale Il Bradipo, 2003.
- Opere, a cura e con un saggio introduttivo di Silvio Perrella, Milano, A. Mondadori, 2003. ISBN 88-04-51361-6. [contiene False partenze (scelta) – Tre romanzi di una giornata; Colapesce; Fiori giapponesi; La neve del Vesuvio; L'armonia perduta; Capri e non più Capri (scelta); Ultimi viaggi nell'Italia perduta (scelta); L'occhio di Napoli (scelta); Letteratura e salti mortali; Il sentimento della letteratura; La mosca nella bottiglia; Lo stile dell'anatra]; nuova ed. rivista e accresciuta in due tomi, Milano, A. Mondadori, 2014. ISBN 978-88-04-63730-1. [Contiene: False partenze; Il mito della bella giornata; Roma; Altre false partenze; I ritorni a Napoli; Fiori giapponesi; Letteratura, senso comune e passione civile; L'amorosa inchiesta; Esercizi superficiali; Me visto da lui stesso]
- Palazzo Donn'Anna. La memoria immaginativa, Napoli, Electa Napoli, 2004. ISBN 88-510-0192-8.
- Positano in prosa, con Riccardo Bacchelli e Carlo Knight, Napoli, Guida, 2004. ISBN 88-7188-847-2.
- Caro Goffredo. Dedicato a Goffredo Parise, Roma, minimum fax, 2005. ISBN 88-7521-042-X.
- L'estro quotidiano, Milano, Mondadori, 2005. ISBN 88-04-53602-0. (Viareggio Prize)
- Racconti. Passeggiata con clementina. Ultima passeggiata con Guappo, disegni di Lucio Del Pezzo, Bagreria, Drago Artecontemporanea, 2005.
- L'amorosa inchiesta, Milano, A. Mondadori, 2006. ISBN 88-04-55331-6.
- 4 storie d'amore, illustrazioni di Mimmo Paladino, Bagheria, Drago, 2007. ISBN 978-88-95082-03-5.
- Amori, Lecce, Manni, 2008. ISBN 978-88-8176-991-9. [brani tratti da Un giorno d'impazienza; Ferito a morte; Amore e psiche; Fiori giapponesi; Lo stile dell'anatra]
- Chiamiamolo Candido. Un'antologia personale. Introdotta e accompagnata da una conversazione con Alessandro Piperno, Napoli, L'ancora del Mediterraneo, 2008. ISBN 978-88-8325-235-8.
- I mesi dell'anno, illustrazioni di Enrico Job, San Cesario di Lecce, Manni, 2008. ISBN 978-88-6266-057-0.
- L'apprendista giornalista (1958–2008), San Marco in Lamis, Istituto d'istruzione secondaria superiore "Pietro Giannone"-Centro documentazione Leonardo Sciascia/Archivio del Novecento, 2008.
- A cuore aperto, Milano, Mondadori, 2009. ISBN 978-88-04-58814-6.
- America 1957, a sentimental journey, Roma, Nottetempo, 2009. ISBN 978-88-7452-181-4.
- Un amore al tempo della Dolce Vita, Roma, Nottetempo, 2009. ISBN 978-88-7452-216-3.
- Napoli, Milano, Oscar Mondadori, 2009. ISBN 978-88-04-58525-1. [contiene L'armonia perduta; L'occhio di Napoli; Napolitan graffiti]
- Confidenziale. Lettere dagli amici, Padova, Il notes magico, 2011. ISBN 978-88-88341-28-6.
- Quando la mattina scendevo in piazzetta, Capri, La Conchiglia, 2011. ISBN 978-88-6091-020-2.
- La nostalgia della bellezza, Milano, Pagine d'arte, 2011. ISBN 978-88-96529-20-1. [Brani scelti da La mosca nella bottiglia]
- Esercizi superficiali. Nuotando in superficie, Milano, Mondadori, 2012. ISBN 978-88-04-61467-8.
- Doppio misto, Milano, Mondadori, 2012. ISBN 978-88-04-62385-4.
- La lezione del canarino, Milano, Il Sole 24 Ore, 2012. [contiene: Il peccato originale; La farfalla; La civettina; Il gufo reale; Il ciuchino; Una visita allo zoo; Il gabbiano; Il granchio; Il polpo; Gli avvoltoi; Cartoni animati; Il gatto; Lo scoiattolo; La bassotta; L'ultima passeggiata con Guappo; Caro Guappo; Il pavone; La lezione del canarino]
- Capri. L'isola il cui nome è iscritto nel mio, con Lorenzo Capellini, Argelato, Minerva, 2012. ISBN 978-88-7381-455-9.
- Novant'anni d'impazienza. Un'autobiografia letteraria, Roma, minimum fax, 2013. ISBN 978-88-7521-529-3.
- Umori e malumori. Diario 2012–2013, Roma, Nottetempo, 2013. ISBN 978-88-7452-463-1.
- La bellezza di Roma, Milano, Mondadori, 2014. ISBN 978-88-04-63795-0.
- Introduzione a me stesso, Roma, Elliot, 2014. ISBN 978-88-6192-666-0.
- Il guarracino che andava per mare, con un'opera di Massimo Nota e una nota di Silvio Perrella, Napoli, ilfilodipartenope, 2014.
- Storia di un'amicizia tra uno scrittore e un lettore. Lettere 1995–2001, con Beppe Agosti, Milano, Archinto, 2014. ISBN 978-88-7768-649-7.
- Al bar, con Umberto Silva, Roma, Nottetempo, 2015. ISBN 978-88-7452-573-7.
- Ai dolci amici addio, Roma, Nottetempo, 2016. ISBN 978-88-7452-603-1.
- Interviste con alieni, Salò, Damiani, 2016. ISBN 978-88-99438-04-3.
- L'isola il cui nome è iscritto nel mio, Argelato, Minerva, 2016. ISBN 978-88-7381-856-4.
- Il fallimento della consapevolezza, Milano, Mondadori, 2018. ISBN 978-88-04-70598-7.
- Di terra e mare, con Silvio Perrella, Bari-Roma, Laterza, 2018. ISBN 978-88-581-3186-2.
- La vita salvata. Conversazioni con Giovanna Stanzione, Milano, Mondadori, 2020. ISBN 978-8804730972.
