= Aliano =

- Comune
- Comune di Aliano
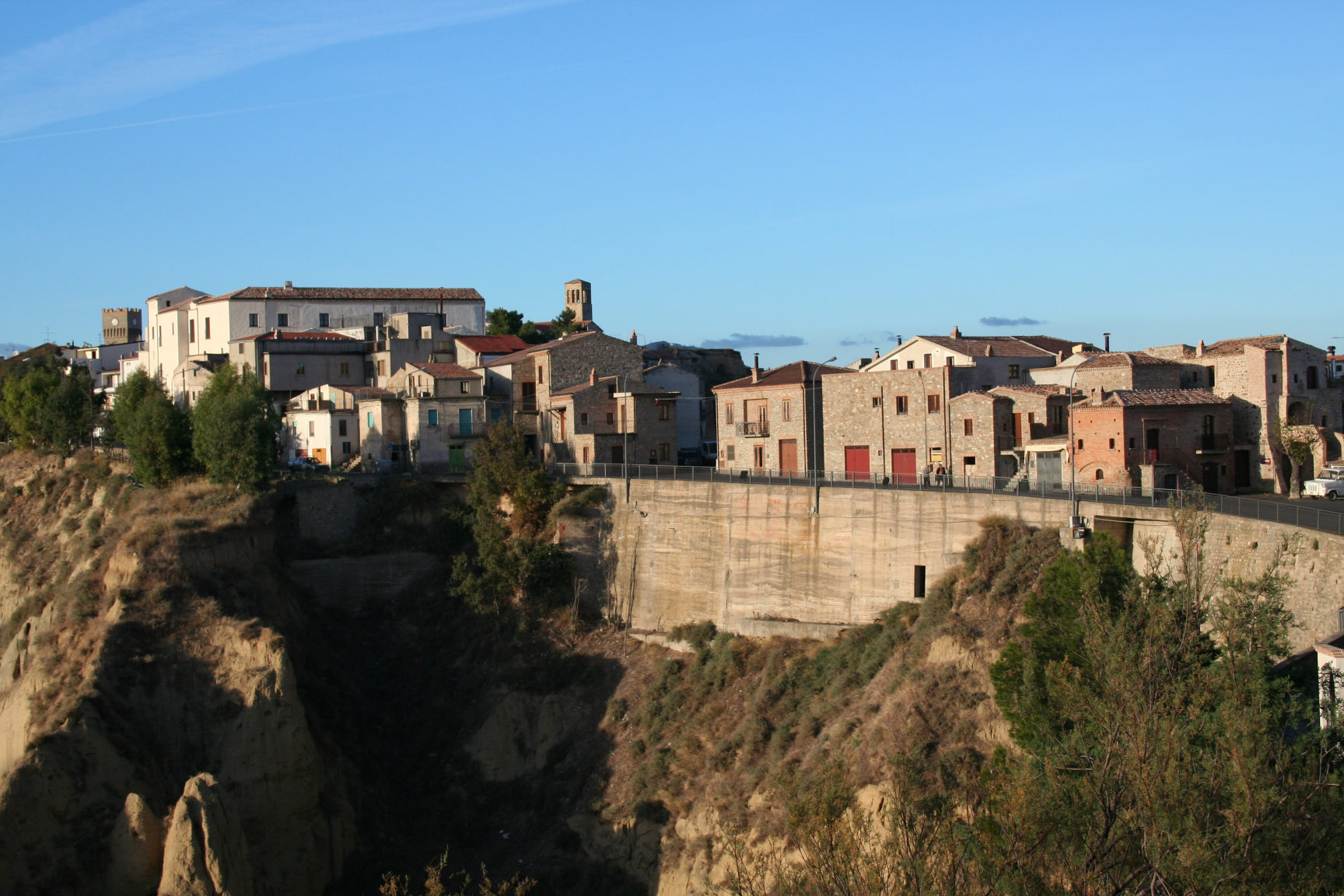
- View of Aliano

- Coat of arms

- Location within Italy Location within Basilicata
- Coordinates: 40°19′N 16°14′E
- Country: Italy
- Region: Basilicata
- Province: Matera (MT)
- Frazioni: Alianello

Government
  - Mayor: Luigi De Lorenzo

Area
  - Total: 98.41 km^{2} (38.00 sq mi)
- Elevation: 498 m (1,634 ft)

Population (1-1-2017)
  - Total: 975
  - Density: 9.91/km^{2} (25.7/sq mi)
- Demonym: Alianesi
- Time zone: UTC+1 (CET)
  - Summer (DST): UTC+2 (CEST)
- Postal code: 75010
- Dialing code: 0835
- ISTAT code: 077002
- Patron saint: St. Aloysius Gonzaga
- Saint day: June 21
- Website: Official website

Aliano is a town and comune in the province of Matera, which is located about 90 kilometres (56 mi) southwest of Matera, in the Southern Italian region of Basilicata.

Aliano was the setting of Carlo Levi's book Christ Stopped at Eboli (Italian: Cristo si è fermato a Eboli), where the town is called Gagliano according to the local pronunciation. Published in 1945, it gives an account of his exile in 1935–1936 in Aliano.

Like many towns in rural Italy it has suffered from migration to the cities and overseas where employment opportunities are better.

== Geography ==
Aliano is located atop calanchi, which are deforested, sandy soiled, rocky hills. Over the town's history, many homes were lost to landslides resulting from deforestation. In 1980 an earthquake shook the region and destroyed or made uninhabitable many of the town's historic buildings. Recent funding, partly from the European Union, has made renovations possible, and parts of the town's historic centre are once again habitable.

== Culture ==
Aliano has its own dialect, alianese, and the population keep many old traditions. One particular example is that, during carnevale male townspeople, dressed in papier mâché masks and hats covered with streamers, wearing long underwear and cow bells, march down the town's main street, throwing flour at gathered crowds and making grunting noises.

Some believe that the significance of the custom was to exorcise evil spirits prior to Lent.

Another tradition is the use of architecture to ward off the evil eye, the malocchio. Many of the town's older homes, including one in the town's historic square called casa con gli occhi ("house with eyes") are formed with two forward windows and a staircase leading from the ground up to the home's main floor. (The ground floor was probably stables for animals.) The combination of stairs and windows make the home look like a face. When lit from the inside, the windows may look like burning eyes, enough to scare away any bad spirits.

== Emigration ==
Population decline is a major problem in Aliano and other similarly sized towns in the poor regions of southern Italy. Lack of employment opportunities, lack of fertile land (if people wish to take up agriculture) and a decrease in interest in continuing the farm life of one's parents are major reasons for population loss. A higher percentage of young people from the South of Italy complete a university education than their peers in the north due to the unemployment situation. Professional jobs are few in southern Italian cities, thus considerable numbers of the villages' most promising young people move their families to the big industrial cities of the North, especially Milan and Bologna.

== Nearby ==
Some 4.2 kilometres (2.6 mi) south of Aliano is the tiny hamlet of Alianello, which is now almost a complete ghost town, after it was destroyed in the 1980 earthquake. Only a shepherd has been known to use some of the vacant homes to house some of his animals, where he keeps guinea pigs for food, and grazes his sheep and goats.
