= A Simple Story (1991 film) =

- Directed by: Emidio Greco
- Screenplay by: Andrea Barbato; Emidio Greco
- Produced by: Claudio Bonivento
- Starring: Gian Maria Volonté
- Cinematography: Tonino Delli Colli
- Music by: Luis Enriquez Bacalov
- Release date: 1991
- Country: Italy
- Language: Italian

A Simple Story (Italian: Una storia semplice) is a 1991 Italian drama film directed by Emidio Greco. It is based on the novel with the same name written by Leonardo Sciascia. It premiered at the 48th Venice International Film Festival, in which it entered the main competition. The film was awarded with a Nastro d'Argento for best screenplay, two Globi d'oro for best film and best screenplay and a Grolla d'oro for best actor to the ensemble cast.

== Plot ==
The Sciascia story unfolds with the arrival in Sicily of a medicine rep from Verona. He is unaware that he witnessed a double murder at a rural railway station until he hears about the event on his car radio. He calls on the local police station to help with the enquiries. The police have discovered the body of a retired ambassador, returned after years of absence, in his remote farmhouse, after he had called them about the discovery of an item (a stolen painting) rolled up in the attic. The police did not call that night, since the duty Inspector thought it might be a hoax (he knew the farm house to be abandoned). The following day the strange appearance of the retired ambassador's body, which appears to have been a suicide, raises suspicion that he may have been murdered. This is the investigating policeman's opinion but it is rejected by the Police Commissioner, who insists on a simple and uncomplicated suicide. There is a suggestion that the Carabinieri who have also turned up at the crime scene are aware of the alternative theory. Meanwhile, interrogation of the medicine rep from Verona clarifies that he had not seen the railway staff, but rather their murderers rolling up a "carpet" (actually the painting) in the station. The investigation proceeds with an old friend of the "suicide," a professor Franzo who reveals more about the telephone conversations they had exchanged before the ambassador's death. It looks to the police as though the farm buildings had been used for criminal activity for some time. The inspector, however, appears to be overly familiar with the inside of the main house and real doubts enter the Brigadiere's mind as to his real involvement in the crime. The judge insists unreasonably that the police Commissioner and Carabinieri should give him cast iron evidence if he is to proceed with any case, as in his view all he heard were conjectures. The estranged widow and son of the ambassador arrive and the extent of the family rift is evident. They appear to have relied on the local parish priest Don Cricco to oversee the mainly abandoned family properties in the area. The film ends with an accident in which the Inspector and Brigadiere exchange pistol shots, killing the Inspector. The police call it an accident.

== Cast ==
- Gian Maria Volonté: Professor Franzò
- Massimo Dapporto: The Inspector
- Ennio Fantastichini: The Commissioner
- Ricky Tognazzi: Brigadier Lepri
- Massimo Ghini: The representative of medicines
- Paolo Graziosi: Colonel of the Carabinieri
- Omero Antonutti: Father Cricco
- Gianmarco Tognazzi: Roccella's son
- Macha Méril: Roccella's mother
- Gianluca Favilla: The prosecutor
- Tony Sperandeo: The first agent
- Giovanni Alamia: The second agent
