= Franco Cristaldi =

Italian film producer (1924–1992)

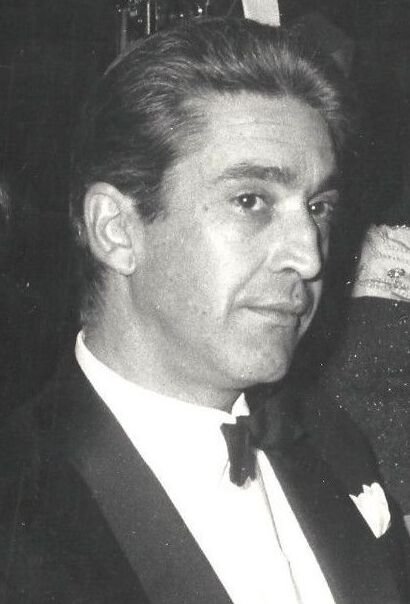
- Cristaldi in 1965
- Born: 3 October 1924; Turin, Italy
- Died: 1 July 1992 (aged 67); Montecarlo, Monaco
- Occupation: Film producer
- Spouses: Carla Simonetti (annulled) Zeudi Araya (m. 1983)
- Partner: Claudia Cardinale (1966–1975)
- Children: 2, including Massimo

Franco Cristaldi (3 October 1924 – 1 July 1992) was an Italian film producer, credited with producing (or co-producing) feature films from the 1950s to the 1990s.

== Career ==
In 1946, Cristaldi founded Vides Cinematografica in Turin. This production company initially produced short and documentary films, and would later be renamed to Cristaldifilm in the 1980s.

In the 1950s, Cristaldi changed his attention to feature films and moved to Rome. During his long career, he worked with directors and screenwriters such as Francesco Rosi, Pietro Germi, Mario Monicelli, Federico Fellini, Luchino Visconti, and Giuseppe Tornatore. A noted film producer from some years in his native Italy, some of Cristaldi's most successful films internationally included The Name of the Rose and Nuovo cinema Paradiso. (The former winning a César and two BAFTAs, and the latter winning several BAFTAs, the Grand Prix at Cannes, and Best Foreign Language Film at the 62nd Academy Awards).

In 1977, Cristaldi was elected president of the International Federation of Film Producers Associations, and was a member of the jury at the 1984 Cannes Film Festival.

== Personal life ==
Cristaldi was born in Turin in 1924 and studied at university for a time before focusing his interests on cinema.

He was first married to Carla Simonetti with whom he had a son, Massimo. He applied to the Vatican to have this marriage annulled, and from 1966 lived with actress Claudia Cardinale. Cristaldi claimed to have married Cardinale, but she refuted this, saying he threw a marriage party, without ever officially marrying her. He mentored Cardinale through her own film career, producing many of her films, until their separation in 1975. In 1983, he married Eritrean actress Zeudi Araya, who starred in several Cristaldi-produced films.

Cristaldi died in Monte Carlo in 1992, survived by his wife Zeudi, son Massimo, and adopted son Patrick, the son of Claudia Cardinale.

== Selected filmography ==
- A Hero of Our Times, (1955)
- Mio figlio Nerone, (1956)
- Le notti bianche, (1957)
- A Man of Straw, (1958)
- Big Deal on Madonna Street, (1958)
- Kapò, (1959)
- Piece of the Sky, (1959)
- Silver Spoon Set, (1960)
- Ghosts of Rome, (1961)
- The Assassin, (1961)
- Divorce, Italian Style, (1961)
- Salvatore Giuliano, (1962)
- Seduced and Abandoned, (1964)
- Sandra, (1965)
- Alibi, (1969)
- The Red Tent, (1969)
- Oh, Grandmother's Dead, (1969)
- The Audience, (1971)
- Lady Caroline Lamb, (1972)
- Amarcord, (1973)
- Christ Stopped at Eboli, (1979)
- Café Express, (1980)
- E la nave va, (1983)
- The Name of the Rose, (1986)
- Nuovo cinema Paradiso, (1988)
