= Emidio Greco =

Italian film director

- Born: 20 October 1938; Leporano, Italy
- Died: 22 December 2012 (aged 74); Rome, Italy
- Occupations: Film director, screenwriter
- Years active: 1974-2012

Emidio Greco (20 October 1938 – 22 December 2012) was an Italian film director and screenwriter, best known for the 1974 film Morel's Invention.

== Life and career ==
Born in Leporano, in the province of Taranto, Greco moved to Turin as a child. In 1964 he graduated at the Centro Sperimentale di Cinematografia, then, two years later, he started an activity as documentarist for RAI TV. In 1971 he attended Roberto Rossellini accompanying him in Chile for a filmed interview with Salvador Allende. In 1974 Greco made his directorial debut in a feature film with Morel's Invention that, well-received from critics, marked him as a real promise in Italian art cinema. His second film, Ehrengard, filmed in 1982, would be released just in 2002 due to the bankruptcy of the producers; from then on, he directed six more films, mainly literary works adaptations. In 1991 he was awarded with a Nastro d'Argento award for best screenplay for the film A Simple Story.

In 2004, Greco, together with Francesco Maselli, founded and organized the "Giornate degli Autori" section at the Venice Film Festival. He died in Rome at 74 after a brief illness.

== Filmography ==
- Morel's Invention (L'invenzione di Morel, 1974)
- Ehrengard (1982)
- Un caso d'incoscienza (1984, TV film)
- L'arte e la società (1988, documentary)
- A Simple Story (Una storia semplice, 1991)
- Milonga (1999)
- The Council of Egypt (Il consiglio d'Egitto, 2003)
- L'uomo privato (2007)
- News from the Excavations (Notizie dagli scavi, 2011)
