= Francesco Rosi =

Italian film director

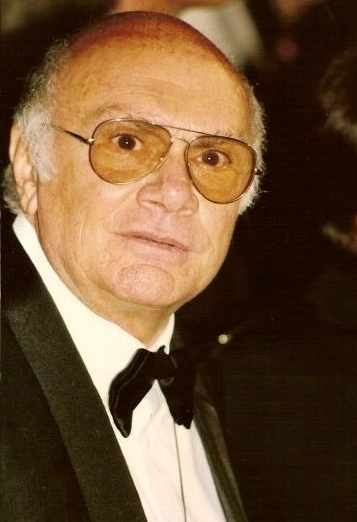
- Rosi at the Cannes Film Festival, 1991
- Born: 15 November 1922; Naples, Kingdom of Italy
- Died: 10 January 2015 (aged 92); Rome, Italy
- Education: University of Naples
- Occupations: Film director; screenwriter
- Years active: 1948–1997
- Children: 1
- Awards: Golden Lion (1963); Palm d'Or (1972); Honorary Golden Bear (2008); Golden Lion (2012, career)

Francesco Rosi (Italian: [franˈtʃesko ˈrɔːzi]; 15 November 1922 – 10 January 2015) was an Italian film director and screenwriter. His film The Mattei Affair won the Palme d'Or at the 1972 Cannes Film Festival. Rosi's films, especially those of the 1960s and 1970s, often appeared to have political messages, while the topics of his later films became less politically oriented and more angled toward literature. He made his debut with his first self-directed film in 1958 and continued to direct until 1997, his last film being the adaptation of Primo Levi's book, The Truce.

In 2008, 13 of his films were screened at the Berlin International Film Festival. He received the Honorary Golden Bear for Lifetime Achievement, accompanied by the screening of his 1962 film Salvatore Giuliano. In 2012 the Venice Biennale awarded Rosi the Golden Lion for Lifetime Achievement.

== Biography ==
=== Origins and early career ===
Rosi was born in Naples in 1922. His father worked in the shipping industry, but was also a cartoonist and had, at one time, been reprimanded for his satirical drawings of Benito Mussolini and King Vittorio Emmanuel III. He attended high school at Liceo Umberto I.

During the Second World War Rosi went to college alongside Giorgio Napolitano who later became Italian President. He studied law and then embarked on a career as an illustrator of children's books. At the same time he began working as a reporter for Radio Napoli. There he became friendly with Raffaele La Capria, Aldo Giuffrè and Giuseppe Patroni Griffi, with each of whom he would later often collaborate.

His show business career began in 1946 as an assistant to Ettore Giannini for the stage production of a work by Salvatore Di Giacomo. He then entered the film industry and worked as an assistant to Luchino Visconti on La Terra Trema ("The Earth Trembles", 1948) and Senso ("Sense", 1954). He wrote several screenplays, including Bellissima ("Beautiful", 1951) and The City Stands Trial ("Processo alla città", 1952), and shot a few scenes of the film Red Shirts ("Camicie rosse", 1952) by Goffredo Alessandrini. In 1956 he co-directed, with Vittorio Gassman, the film Kean – Genio e sregolatezza ("Kean – Genius and recklessness"), about the Shakespearean actor Edmund Kean.

His emergence as a director was his 1958 film La sfida (The Challenge), based on the story of Camorra boss Pasquale Simonetti, known as Pasquale 'e Nola, and Pupetta Maresca. The realist nature of this film caused a stir in alluding to mafia control of the government. Of the film, Rosi himself said, "A director makes his first film with passion and without regard for what has gone before". But David Shipman comments "... but this is in fact a reworking of La Terra Trema, with the Visconti arias replaced by Zavattini's naturalism."

The following year he directed The Magliari ("I magliari"), in which the main character, an Italian immigrant in Germany, travels between Hamburg and Hanover and clashes with a Neapalitan mafioso boss over control of the fabric market. Shipman writes:

I magliari (1959) also concerns racketeers, and they are rival con-men (Alberto Sordi, Renato Salvatori) preying on their compatriots, immigrant workers in Germany. Sordi, like the protagonist in La sfida, manages to antagonise his colleagues more than his rivals – and this was to be a continuing theme in Rosi's films. For the moment it means that both films end dispiritedly, and they are further weakened by an uncertain grasp of narrative – though that is partly hidden in the vigorous handling of individual scenes and the photography of Gianni Di Venanzo.

=== 1960s ===
Rosi was one of the central figures of the politicised post-neorealist 1960s and 1970s of Italian cinema, along with Gillo Pontecorvo, Pier Paolo Pasolini, the Taviani brothers, Ettore Scola and Valerio Zurlini. Dealing with a corrupt postwar Italy, Rosi's movies take on controversial issues, such as Salvatore Giuliano, a film that won the Silver Bear for Best Director at the 12th Berlin International Film Festival in 1962. The film examined the life of the Sicilian gangster Giuliano, using the technique of a long series of flashbacks. Shipman suggests that the film, with a "superb unity of the landscape and people of Sicily" ... "made Rosi's international reputation."

In 1963 he directed Rod Steiger in the film Hands over the City ("Le mani sulla città"), in which he denounced the collusion between the various government departments and the urban reconstruction programmes in Naples. The film was awarded the Golden Lion at the Venice Film Festival. The film, together with Salvatore Giuliano, is generally considered the first of his films concerning political issues, later to be expressed in the flexible and spontaneous acting of Gian Maria Volonté. Rosi himself explained the film's purpose: "What interests me passionately is how a character behaves in the relation to the collectivity of society. I'm not making a study of character but of society. To understand what a man is like in his private drama you must begin to understand him in his public life".

In The Moment of Truth ("Il momento della verità", 1965), Rosi changed what was planned as a documentary about Spain in to a film about bullfighter Miguel Marco Miguelin. Shipman comments: "The wide screen and colour footage of the corrida were incomparably superior to those seen outside Spain hitherto."

After this Rosi moved into the unfamiliar world of the movie fable with More Than a Miracle (also titled Cinderella Italian Style and Happily Ever After, Italian: "C'era una volta" – "Once Upon a Time ..."). Loosely based on Neapolitan fairy tales, the film starred Sophia Loren and Omar Sharif, although Rosi had initially asked for the part to be played by Marcello Mastroianni.

=== 1970s ===
His 1970 film Many Wars Ago ("Uomini contro") dealt with the futility of war, focusing on the Trentino Front of 1916–17 during World War I, where Italian officers made unrealistic demands of the men under their command. It was based on the novel Un anno sull'altopiano by Emilio Lussu. The lead is played by Mark Frechette and the cost of the film was such that Rosi needed to secure Yugoslavian collaboration. Shipman writes: "The Alpine battlefield has been imaginatively and bloodily re-created, and photographed in steely colours by Pasqualino De Santis, but Rosi's urge to say something important – doubtless intense after the last two films – resulted only in cliché: that military men are fanatics and war is hell."

The years 1972 to 1976 cemented Rosi's reputation internationally as a director who dealt with controversial subjects such as the mysterious death of oil magnate Enrico Mattei (The Mattei Affair, 1972, which won the Palme d'Or at Cannes Film Festival); the political machinations around gangster Lucky Luciano (Lucky Luciano, 1974), and corruption in the judiciary, Illustrious Corpses ("Cadaveri Eccellenti", 1976). During the preparation of The Mattei Affair Rosi was in contact with Mauro De Mauro, the Sicilian journalist murdered in mysterious circumstances for reasons which, it is suspected, included an investigation on behalf of Rosi, into the death of the president of the Italian state-owned oil and gas conglomerate Eni.

Lucky Luciano (1973) starred Gian Maria Volonté with Steiger in a sub-plot about another Italo-American. Edmond O'Brien featured as a UN man. Norman Mailer described the film as "the most careful, the most thoughtful, the truest, and the most sensitive to the paradoxes to a society of crime".

In 1976 followed Illustrious Corpses ("Cadaveri eccellenti"), based on the novel Equal Danger by Leonardo Sciascia, with Lino Ventura. The film is praised highly by Shipman, who describes it as: "a film so rich, so powerful and so absorbing that it leaves the spectator breathless. ... This is a film, rare in the history of cinema, in which location – as opposed to decor – is a character in its own right, commenting on the action." Writing in The Observer, Russell Davies said, "Few directors select their shots with such flamboyant intelligence as this".

In 1979 Rosi directed Christ Stopped at Eboli, based on the memoir of the same name by Carlo Levi, again with Volonté as the protagonist. It won the Golden Prize at the 11th Moscow International Film Festival and was to win BAFTA Award for Best Foreign Language Film in 1983. Rosi had been invited by the state-owned television service RAI to select a subject for filming, and the four-part television programme was cut into a 141-minute feature film which he described as "a journey through my own conscience". Shipman writes, "the film retains all the mystery of Rosi's best work – an enquiry where at least half the answers are withheld. In this enquiry there is a respect for the historical process, but the usual magisterial blend of art and dialectic is softened by a sympathy much deeper than that of Il Momento Della Verità. The occasional self-conscious shot that we associate with peasantry cannot mar it."

=== 1980s and 1990s ===
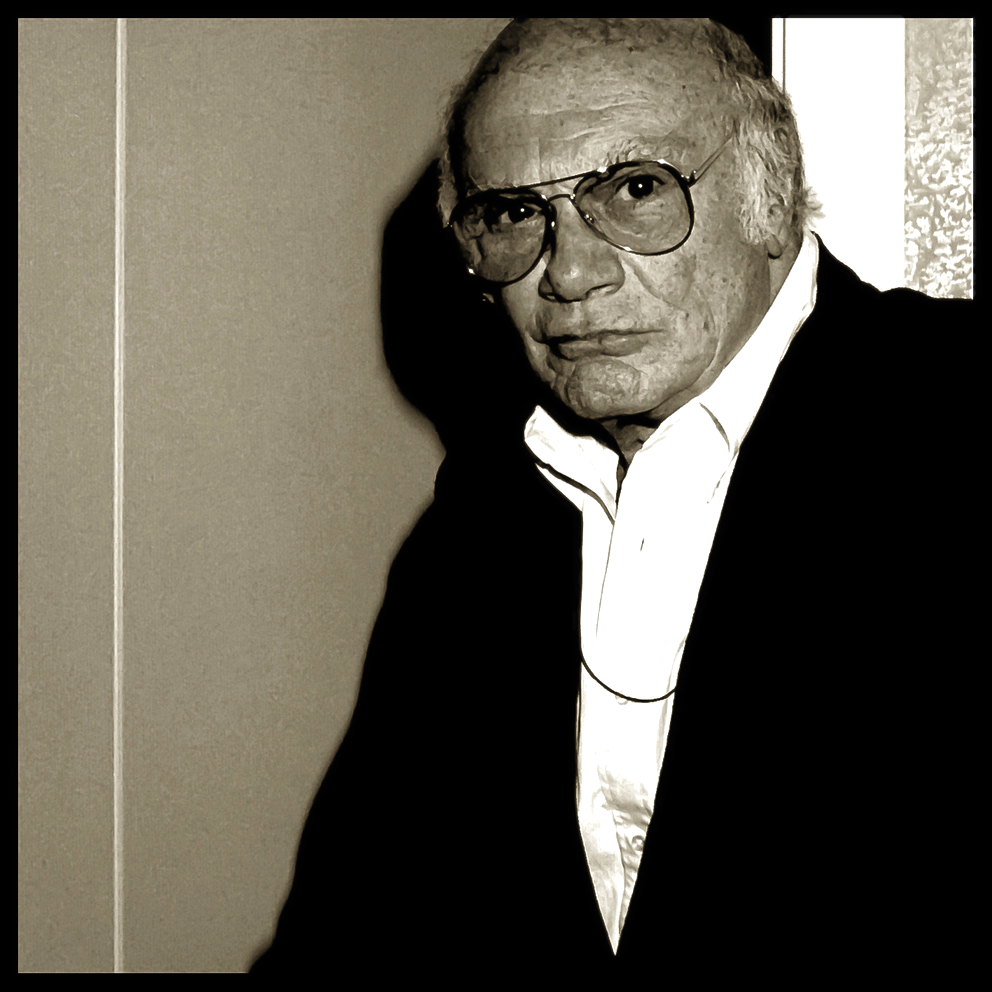
Francesco Rosi in 1995, photographed by Augusto De Luca

After another successful film Three Brothers ("Tre fratelli", 1981), with Philippe Noiret, Michele Placido and Vittorio Mezzogiorno, Rosi wanted to film the novel The Truce by Primo Levi, but the writer's suicide, in April 1987, forced the cancellation of the project. The film was finally made in 1997. He directed a film adaptation of Carmen (1984) with Plácido Domingo and subsequently he worked on Chronicle of a Death Foretold (1987), adapted from the novel by Gabriel García Márquez, which starred Gian Maria Volonté, Ornella Muti, Rupert Everett, Anthony Delon and Lucia Bosè. The film was shot in Mompox, Colombia.

In 1990 he directed The Palermo Connection ("Dimenticare Palermo") with Jim Belushi, Mimi Rogers, Vittorio Gassman, Philippe Noiret and Giancarlo Giannini. He then returned to the theatre direction with the comedies of Eduardo De Filippo: Napoli milionaria!, Le voci di dentro and Filumena Marturano, all performed by Luca De Filippo.

His last film as director was 1997's The Truce, based on holocaust survivor Levi's memoir, and starring John Turturro. Rosi described the film in a 2008 interview with Variety as being about "the return to life."

=== Recognition, later life and death ===
In 2008 his 1963 film Hands over the City was included on the Italian Ministry of Cultural Heritage's 100 Italian films to be saved, a list of 100 films that "have changed the collective memory of the country between 1942 and 1978."

The 58th edition of the Berlin International Film Festival in 2008 played tribute to Rosi by screening 13 films in its Homage section, a feature being reserved for film-makers of outstanding quality and achievement. He received the Honorary Golden Bear for Lifetime Achievement on 14 February 2008, accompanied by the screening of Salvatore Giuliano.

In 2009 he was awarded the Cavaliere della Legion d'Onore, in 2010 the "Golden Halberd" at the Trieste Film Festival and in May 2012 the Board of the Venice Biennale unanimously approved the proposal of its director Alberto Barber, to award Rosi the Golden Lion for Lifetime Achievement at its 69th show. Barber praised Rosi for his "absolute rigor in historic reconstruction, never making any compromises on a political or ethical level, combined with engaging storytelling and splendid visuals."

On 27 October 2010 he became an honorary citizen of Matelica, the birthplace of Enrico Mattei, while in 2013, in the presence of the Italian Minister of Cultural Heritage Massimo Bra, he was given the honorary citizenship of Matera, where he had shot three of his films. In 2014 he took part in the film Born in the USE, co-produced by Renzo Rossellini and directed by Michele Dioma.

In the last part of his life he lived on the Via Gregoriana in Rome near the Spanish Steps. In April 2010, his wife Giancarla Mandelli died.

Rosi died on 10 January 2015 at the age of 92, whilst at home, as a result of complications from bronchitis.

A memorial service was held in Rome on 10 January with the viewing of the body taking place at the Casa del Cinema, and with many fellow Italian film-makers, including fellow director Giuseppe Tornatore, in attendance. The President of Italy Giorgio Napolitano, Rosi's friend from their schooldays sent roses. The director Giuseppe Piccioni said Rosi's work gave Italy "identity and dignity" continuing, "Rosi was one of those artists who lived his work like a mission."

Director Paolo Sorrentino dedicates his 2015 movie Youth with a simple end credit "For Francesco Rosi".

=== Legacy ===
The Variety Movie Guide says of Rosi: "Most films by Francesco Rossi probe well under the surface of people and events to establish a constant link between the legal and the illegal exercise of power."

Writing Rosi's obituary in The Guardian, David Robinson and John Francis Lane said:

In his best films, the director Francesco Rosi ... was essentially a crusading, investigative journalist concerned with the corruption and inequalities of the economically depressed Italian south. He believed that “the audience should not be just passive spectators”: he wanted to make people think and question.

The British Film Institute, recognising that Rosi had made historical films, war pictures and family dramas, in a directorial career that spanned almost four decades, said "he will be remembered above all as the master of the ‘cine-investigation’ and an influence on several generations of artists, including the likes of Martin Scorsese, Francis Ford Coppola, Roberto Saviano and Paolo Sorrentino.

Interviewed by The New York Times after Rosi's death, actor John Turturro who played Primo Levi in Rosi's last film The Truce, called Rosi "something of a mentor". He said, "I would never have read all of Primo Levi’s work if not for him. There are a lot of films I never would have otherwise seen... He was a wonderful actor. He helped you physically as an actor. If he had trouble explaining something, he could act it out, and all the actors understood."

== Awards ==
=== BAFTA ===
Awarded by British Academy of Film and Television Arts:

- 1983 : BAFTA Award for Best Foreign Language Film – Christ Stopped at Eboli
- 1986 : nominated for Best Foreign Language Film – Carmen

=== Cannes Film Festival ===
Awarded at the Cannes Film Festival:

- 1972 : Palme d'Or – The Mattei Affair

=== Venice Biennale ===
- 1963 : Golden Lion – Hands over the City
- 2012 : Golden Lion for Lifetime Achievement

=== David di Donatello Award ===
- 1965 : Best Director – The Moment of Truth
- 1976 : Best Director – Illustrious Corpses
- 1976 : Best Film – Illustrious Corpses
- 1979 : Best Director – Christ Stopped at Eboli
- 1979 : Best Film – Christ Stopped at Eboli
- 1981 : Best Director – Three Brothers
- 1981 : Best Screenplay – Three Brothers
- 1985 : Best Director – Carmen
- 1981 : Best Film – Carmen
- 1985 : Best Cinematography – Carmen
- 1997 : Best Film – The Truce
- 1997 : Best Director – The Truce

=== Moscow International Film Festival ===
- 1979 : Grand Prix – Christ Stopped at Eboli

=== Silver Ribbon ===
The Nastro d'Argento, awarded by the Sindacato Nazionale Giornalisti Cinematografici Italiani:

- 1959: Best Original Film – The Challenge
- 1963: Best Director – Salvatore Giuliano
- 1981: Best Director – Three Brothers
- 2014: Lifetime Achievement Award

=== Academy Award for Best Foreign Language Film ===
- 1981 : nomination for Academy Award for Best Foreign Language Film – Three Brothers

=== Berlin Film Festival ===
Awarded at the Berlin International Film Festival:

- 1962 : Silver Bear for Best Director – Salvatore Giuliano
- 2008 : Honorary Golden Bear

=== BIF (Bari International Film Festival) ===
- 2010 : "Premio Federico Fellini" for artistic excellence

== Honours ==
- Italy * 1995: Cavaliere di gran croce dell'Ordine al merito della Repubblica Italiana
- Italy * 1987: Grande ufficiale dell'Ordine al merito della Repubblica Italiana
- France * 2009: Officier de la Légion d'honneur

== Filmography ==
=== Director ===
Rosi directed 20 films, starting with some scenes in Goffredo Alessandrini's Red Shirts. His last film was The Truce in 1997.

- 1952 – Red Shirts (Camicie rosse)
- 1956 – Kean (Kean – Genio e sregolatezza), co-directed with Vittorio Gassman.
- 1958 – The Challenge (La sfida)
- 1959 – The Magliari (I magliari)
- 1962 – Salvatore Giuliano
- 1963 – Hands over the City (Le mani sulla città)
- 1965 – The Moment of Truth (Il momento della verità)
- 1967 – More than a Miracle (C'era una volta...)
- 1970 – Many Wars Ago (Uomini contro)
- 1972 – The Mattei Affair (Il caso Mattei)
- 1973 – Lucky Luciano
- 1976 – Illustrious Corpses (Cadaveri eccellenti)
- 1979 – Christ Stopped at Eboli (Cristo si è fermato a Eboli)
- 1981 – Three Brothers (Tre fratelli)
- 1984 – Carmen
- 1987 – Chronicle of a Death Foretold (Cronaca di una morte annunciata)
- 1989 – 12 registi per 12 città, a collaboration work with 11 other directors.
- 1989 – The Palermo Connection (Dimenticare Palermo)
- 1992 – Neapolitan Diary (Diario napoletano)
- 1997 – The Truce (La tregua)

=== Writer ===
- Bellissima (1951)
- The City Stands Trial (1952)
- Racconti romani (1955)
- The Bigamist (1956)

=== Director and screenwriter ===
Original subjects

- La sfida (1958)
- The Magliari (1959)
- Salvatore Giuliano (1962)
- Hands over the City (1963)
- The Moment of Truth (1964)
- More Than a Miracle (1967)
- The Mattei Affair (1971)
- Lucky Luciano (1973)
- Diario napoletano (1992)

Non-original subjects

- Kean – Genio e sregolatezza (1956, subject by Dumas and Sartre)
- Many Wars Ago (1970, subject by Emilio Lussu)
- Illustrious Corpses (1976, from the novel by Leonardo Sciascia)
- Christ Stopped at Eboli (1979, taken from the eponymous novel by Carlo Levi)
- Three Brothers (1981, based on the story The Third Son by Andrei Platonov")
- Carmen (1984, taken from the opera by Bizet)
- Chronicle of a Death Foretold (1987, based on the novel by Gabriel García Márquez)
- The Palermo Connection (1990, taken from the eponymous novel of Edmonde Charles-Roux)
- The Truce (1997, taken from the eponymous novel by Primo Levi)

== Theatre ==
=== Director ===
- In Memory of a Lady Friend (Giuseppe Patroni Griffi, 1963)
- The Millions of Naples (Eduardo De Filippo, 2003)
- The Voices Within (Eduardo De Filippo, 2006)
- Filumena Marturano (Eduardo De Filippo, 2008)
