= Alain Cuny =

French actor (1908–1994)

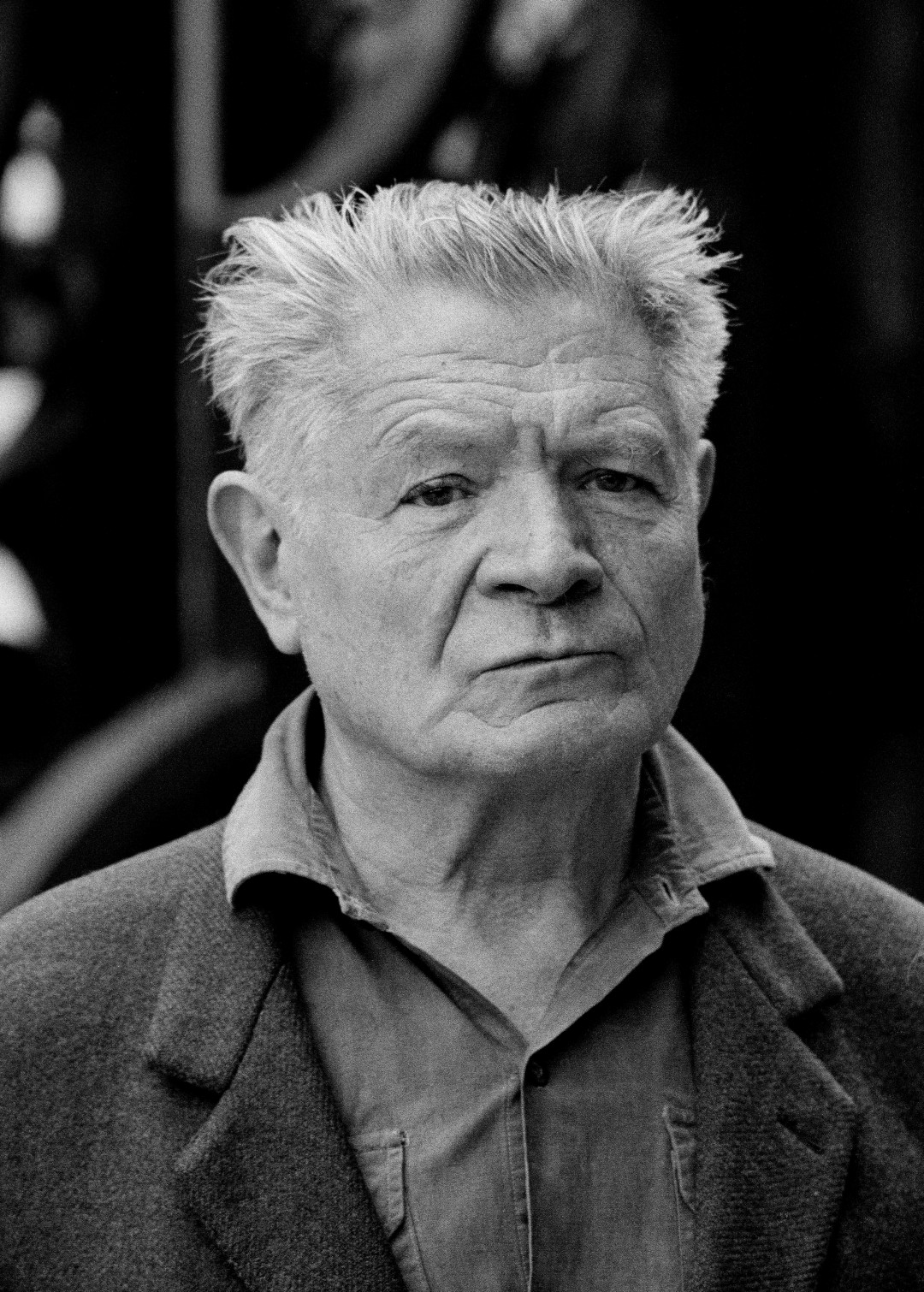
- Cuny in 1979
- Born: René Xavier Marie Alain Cuny; 12 July 1908; Saint-Malo, Brittany, France
- Died: 16 May 1994 (aged 85); Paris, France
- Resting place: Civry-la-Forêt 5
- Occupation: Actor
- Years active: 1941–1994

René Xavier Marie Alain Cuny (12 July 1908 – 16 May 1994) was a French actor of stage and screen. He was closely linked with the works of Paul Claudel and Antonin Artaud, and for his performances for the Théâtre national populaire and Odéon-Théâtre de France.

His film work included collaborations with directors Marcel Carné, Louis Malle, Jean-Luc Godard, Federico Fellini, Michelangelo Antonioni, Francesco Rosi and Luis Buñuel. He was nominated for the César Award for Best Supporting Actor for the 1988 film Camille Claudel, and won the Joseph Plateau Lifetime Achievement Award in 1992.

== Early life ==
René Xavier Marie Alain Cuny was born in Saint-Malo, Brittany. He was brought up by an aunt and spent a large part of his childhood with her, in Boucé, and spent several years in an orphanage. He developed an early interest in painting and from the age of 15 he attended the École des Beaux-Arts in Paris. He met Picasso, Braque and members of the surrealist group. He then began working in the film industry as a costume, poster and set designer and was employed on films of Cavalcanti, Feyder and Renoir. After a meeting with the actor-manager Charles Dullin, Cuny was persuaded to study drama and he began acting on stage in the late 1930s.

== Career ==
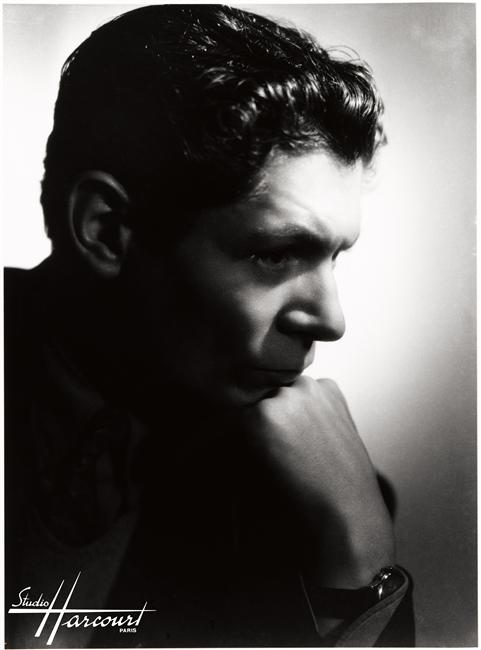
Studio Harcourt headshot of Cuny, 1945

In the theatre, Cuny became particularly linked with the works of Paul Claudel (who said of him after a performance of L'Annonce faite à Marie in 1944, "I have been waiting for you 20 years"). Another literary friend and hero was Antonin Artaud, "whose texts he read with supreme conviction at a time when Artaud was more or less an outcast, a situation reflected in Artaud's Van Gogh: The Man Suicided by Society, which Cuny interpreted in his voice's fabulous organ tones". Later Cuny worked with Jean Vilar at the Théâtre national populaire, and with Jean-Louis Barrault at the Odéon-Théâtre de France. His dramatic presence and measured diction made him well-suited to many classical roles.

His first major role in the cinema was as one of the devil's envoys in Marcel Carné's film Les Visiteurs du soir (1942). A few other romantic leading parts followed, but increasingly he appeared in supporting roles, especially in characterizations of intellectuals such as the tormented philosopher Steiner in La Dolce Vita (1960), directed by Federico Fellini. He worked frequently in Italian cinema and had close associations with Michelangelo Antonioni and Francesco Rosi as well as Fellini. One of his most admired film performances was in Rosi's Uomini contro (Many Wars Ago, 1970), as the rigidly authoritarian General Leone.

Among his French films were The Lovers (Les Amants, 1958), directed by Louis Malle, and Jean-Luc Godard's Détective (1985). He also appeared in the softcore porn film Emmanuelle (1974), a role which he said he took to show his contempt for the film business. In the same year, he played Sitting Bull in the absurdist western Touche pas à la femme blanche! (Don't Touch the White Woman!, 1974).

Towards the end of his career he returned to aspects of Claudel. He appeared in Camille Claudel (1988), a biographical film about the author's sister in which he played their father, Louis-Prosper Claudel. In 1991, he completed a long-planned film adaptation of a Claudel play The Annunciation of Marie (L'Annonce faite à Marie, 1991), a French-Canadian production in which he both directed and acted; it won him the Prix Georges-Sadoul. He also gave regular readings of Claudel's work at the Festival d'Avignon.

== Personal life ==
In 1962, he married Marie-Blanche Guidicelli. The couple divorced in 1969.

== Death ==
Cuny died in 1994 in Paris. He is buried in Civry-la-Forêt, west of Paris, where he had lived.

== Partial filmography ==
- 1940: Après Mein Kampf mes crimes (directed by Alexandre Ryder) - Marinus van der Lubbe
- 1941: Madame Sans-Gêne (directed by Roger Richebé) - Roustan
- 1941: Remorques (Stormy Waters) (directed by Jean Grémillon) - Un matelot du 'Mirva' (uncredited)
- 1942: Les Visiteurs du soir (directed by Marcel Carné) - Gilles - un ménestrel
- 1943: Le Baron fantôme (The Phantom Baron) (directed by Serge de Poligny) - Hervé
- 1946: Solita de Cordoue (directed by Willy Rozier) - Pierre Desluc
- 1951: Il Cristo proibito (The Forbidden Christ) (directed by Curzio Malaparte) - Antonio
- 1952: Camicie rosse (Red Shirts) (directed by Goffredo Alessandrini and Francesco Rosi) - Bueno
- 1952: Les Conquérants solitaires (directed by Claude Vermorel) - Pascal Giroud
- 1953: La signora senza camelie (The Lady Without Camelias) (directed by Michelangelo Antonioni) - Lodi
- 1953: Mina de Vanghel (directed by Maurice Barry and Maurice Clavel) - M. de Larçay
- 1953: Notre-Dame de Paris (The Hunchback of Notre Dame) (directed by Jean Delannoy) - Claude Frollo
- 1958: Les Amants (The Lovers) (directed by Louis Malle) - Henri Tournier
- 1960: La dolce vita (directed by Federico Fellini) - Steiner
- 1961: Scano Boa (directed by Renato Dall'Ara) - Cavarzvan
- 1962: La Croix des vivants (Cross of the Living) (directed by Ivan Govar) - Baron VonEggerth
- 1963: Peau de banane (Banana Peel)) (directed by Marcel Ophüls) - Hervé Bontemps
- 1963: La corruzione (Corruption) (directed by Mauro Bolognini) - Leonardo Mattioli
- 1965: Astataïon, ou Le Festin des morts (Mission of Fear) (directed by Fernand Dansereau) - Jean de Bréboeuf
- 1969: La Voie lactée (The Milky Way) (directed by Luis Buñuel) - L'homme à la cape / Man with cape
- 1969: Satyricon (directed by Federico Fellini) - Lica
- 1970: Uomini contro (Many Wars Ago) (directed by Francesco Rosi) - generale Leone
- 1971: La grande scrofa nera (directed by Filippo Ottoni) - Il Padre di Enrico
- 1971: Valparaiso, Valparaiso (directed by Filippo Ottoni)- Balthazar Lamarck-Caulaincourt
- 1972: L'udienza (directed by Marco Ferreri) - Padre gesuita
- 1972: Il maestro e Margherita (The Master and Margaret) (directed by Aleksandar Petrović) - Profesor Woland & Satana
- 1973: La rosa rossa (directed by Franco Giraldi)
- 1974: Touche pas à la femme blanche! (Don't Touch the White Woman!) (directed by Marco Ferreri) - Sitting Bull
- 1974: Emmanuelle (directed by Just Jaeckin) - Mario
- 1975: Two in the Amsterdam Rain (directed by Koreyoshi Kurahara)
- 1975: Irene, Irene (directed by Peter Del Monte) - Guido Boeri
- 1976: Cadaveri eccellenti (Illustrious Corpses) (directed by Francesco Rosi) - Judge Rasto
- 1976: I prosseneti (directed by Brunello Rondi) - Il conte Davide
- 1977: Jacques Prévert (directed by Jean Desvilles) - Himself
- 1978: El recurso del método (The Recourse to the Method) (directed by Miguel Littín) - El Académico
- 1978: La Chanson de Roland (The Song of Roland) (directed by Frank Cassenti) - Turpin / Le moine
- 1979: Cristo si è fermato a Eboli (Christ Stopped at Eboli) (directed by Francesco Rosi) - Barone Nicola Rotunno
- 1979: Roberte (directed by Pierre Zucca) - pur esprit (voice)
- 1981: Les Jeux de la Comtesse Dolingen de Gratz (directed by Catherine Binet)
- 1982: Les Maîtres du temps (directed by René Laloux) - Xul (voice)
- 1983: Quartetto Basileus (Basileus Quartet) (directed by Fabio Carpi) -
- 1985: Détective (directed by Jean-Luc Godard) - Old Mafioso
- 1987: Cronaca di una morte annunciata (Chronicle of a Death Foretold) (directed by Francesco Rosi) - Widower
- 1987: Lucky Ravi (directed by Vincent Lombard) - Plantation Owner
- 1987: Das weite Land (The Distant Land) (directed by Luc Bondy) - Aigner - le père d'Otto
- 1988: Umi e, See You (directed by Koreyoshi Kurahara) - Don Macine
- 1988: Camille Claudel (directed by Bruno Nuytten) - Louis-Prosper Claudel
- 1989: La Nuit de l'éclusier (directed by Franz Rickenbach) - Gutberg
- 1990: Les Chevaliers de la Table ronde (directed by Denis Llorca) - Merlin
- 1991: Sweet War, Farewell (directed by Silvano Agosti) - Crimen
- 1991: L'Annonce faite à Marie (The Annunciation of Marie) (directed by Alain Cuny) - Anne Vercors
- 1992: Le Retour de Casanova (The Return of Casanova) (directed by Édouard Niermans) - Marquis
