= Victoria Zinny =

Italian actress (born 1943)

- Born: 13 May 1943 (age 82); Buenos Aires, Argentina
- Occupation: Actress

Victoria Zinny (born 13 May 1943) is an Argentine-Italian film, stage and television actress, whose career spanned over 60 years.

== Life and career ==
Born in Buenos Aires, Zinny is the daughter of Ukrainian writer and socialite Julia Prilutzky Farny. She moved to Spain to study journalism at the University of Madrid. Noted by Luis Buñuel, in 1961 she made her acting debut in Viridiana. In 1964 and 1967 she had two children, Karl and Veronica, from the painter Jacques Harvey.

Moved to Italy, she specialized in dramatic roles, and after several supporting roles she got critical recognition for her performance in Pasquale Squitieri's Viaggia, ragazza, viaggia, hai la musica nelle vene. In 1976, she began a long relationship with Italian actor Remo Girone, whom she married in 1982. The couple often collaborated on stage, in films and on television.

== Selected filmography ==
- Viridiana, directed by Luis Buñuel (1961)
- Wild, Wild Planet, directed by Antonio Margheriti (1965)
- Quella piccola differenza, directed by Duccio Tessari (1970)
- The Blonde in the Blue Movie, directed by Steno (1971)
- Shoot the Living and Pray for the Dead, directed by Giuseppe Vari (1971)
- Viaggia, ragazza, viaggia, hai la musica nelle vene, directed by Pasquale Squitieri (1973)
- Keoma, directed by Enzo G. Castellari (1976)
- A Spiral of Mist, directed by Eriprando Visconti (1978)
- Starcrash, directed by Luigi Cozzi (1978)
- Hypochondriac, directed by Tonino Cervi (1979)
- Savage Breed, directed by Pasquale Squitieri (1980)
- Catherine and I, directed by Alberto Sordi (1980)
- Fantasma d'amore, directed by Dino Risi (1981)
- Il turno, directed by Tonino Cervi (1981)
- Journey with Papa, directed by Alberto Sordi (1982)
- A tu per tu, directed by Sergio Corbucci (1984)
- Everybody in Jail, directed by Alberto Sordi (1984)
- Quartiere, directed by Silvano Agosti (1987)
- Beyond the Door III, directed by Jeff Kwitny (1989)
- Atto di dolore, directed by Pasquale Squitieri (1990)
- La seconda ombra, directed by Silvano Agosti (2000)
- In Love and War, directed by John Kent Harrison (2001)
- Persona non grata, directed by Krzysztof Zanussi (2005)
- The Duchess of Langeais, directed by Jacques Rivette (2006)
- Black Sun, directed by Krzysztof Zanussi (2007)
- Rock Paper Scissors, directed by Yan Lanouette Turgeon (2013)
- Foreign Body, directed by Krzysztof Zanussi (2014)
- Mothers, directed by Liana Marabini (2017)
- Eter, directed by Krzysztof Zanussi (2018)
