= The Annunciation of Marie =

- Directed by: Alain Cuny
- Written by: Paul Claudel; Alain Cuny
- Produced by: Hugues Desmichelle
- Starring: Ulrika Jonsson; Christelle Challab; Roberto Benavente; Alain Cuny
- Music by: François-Bernard Mache
- Distributed by: Astral Bellevue Pathe Ltd; Les Films Sans Frontieres
- Release date: 18 December 1991 (France)
- Running time: 91 minutes
- Countries: France, Canada
- Language: French

The Annunciation of Marie (French: L'Annonce faite à Marie) is a 1991 French-Canadian film. It is an adaptation of the play of the same name by Paul Claudel.

== Production ==
The director of this film, the French stage and film actor Alain Cuny, was for years a friend and associate of the diplomat, playwright and symbolist poet Paul Claudel (1868–1955), whose sister Camille was possibly better known outside the French-speaking world. In fact, one of Cuny's late acting roles was in the 1988 film Camille Claudel, based on the sculptor's life. Before he died in 1955, the playwright asked that Cuny direct a picture based on his play L'Annonce faite a Marie, and in this somewhat stage-bound production, he honored that request. It was filmed in Montreal, Quebec, Canada and Civry-la-Foret, France.

== Plot ==
Set at the time of the Crusades, it tells the story of love and tragedy, intermingled with mysticism. Jacques is betrothed to marry Violane, a beautiful and gentle woman. When she discovers that she has leprosy, however, the marriage is off, and she retires to a life of prayer at an isolated hermitage. Instead, Jacques marries her sister Mara. When Jacques and Mara's child dies shortly after birth, Mara implores her saintly sister to come out of isolation to bring her child back to life.

== Release ==
The film was released in France on 18 December 1991. It also premiered at the Berlin International Film Festival on 15 February 1992. Ironically, it was never released internationally.

== Reception ==
In 1991 it won the Prix Georges Sadoul award and in 1992 it won the Prize of the Ecumenical Jury at the Berlin International Film Festival.
