= Sweet War, Farewell =

1991 drama film

- Directed by: Silvano Agosti
- Screenplay by: Silvano Agosti
- Produced by: Silvano Agosti
- Starring: Alain Cuny; Lou Castel
- Cinematography: Silvano Agosti
- Edited by: Silvano Agosti
- Music by: Daniele Iacono
- Release date: 1991
- Language: Italian

Sweet War, Farewell (Italian: Uova di garofano, lit. 'Carnation eggs') is a 1991 Italian coming-of-age drama film written and directed by Silvano Agosti and starring Alain Cuny. It premiered at the 48th Venice International Film Festival.

== Cast ==
- Alain Cuny as Crimen
- Federico Zanola as Silvano
- Lou Castel as Silvano as an adult
- Elisa Murolo as Elisa
- Severino Saltarelli as the father
- Paola Agosti as the aunt
- Toti Barone as the general
- Franco Piavoli as the doctor

== Production ==
The film recounts the director's childhood in the rural outskirts of Brescia at the time of World War II. It is an adaptation from Agosti's autobiographical novel Uova di garofano, first published in 1987.

== Release ==
The film had its world premiere at the 48th edition of the Venice Film Festival, in the Mattinate del Cinema Italiano ("Italian Cinema Mornings") sidebar.

== Reception ==
La Repubblica's film critic Paolo D'Agostini praised the film, describing it as "a dreamlike autobiography yet at the same time historically detailed, [...] a film rich in its harmony, perhaps because it faithfully reflects the personality of its author". Paolo Mereghetti also lauded the film, calling it "unjustly overlooked", "both delicate and harsh", and possessing "an evocative atmosphere that, while respecting historical reality, restores to childhood its inherent vitality, emotional depth, and human dignity.".

For this film, Agosti received a Nastro d'Argento nomination as best director, and won the Ciak d'Oro for best editing.
