= Mothers (2017 Italian film) =

Mothers is an Italian film written and directed by Liana Marabini. It is intended to show in a realistic manner the tragedy of the mothers of those young men who enlist in the jihad. The film was produced by Condor Pictures in association with Liamar Multimedia.

== Plot ==
This film shows the tragedy of women whose sons enlist in the Jihad. They are part of very distant worlds: Angela is a well-known writer, a rich widow who never remarried after her husband's death. She dedicated her life to her son, Sean, and to her writing. They live in Italy. Fatima is a Moroccan who emigrated very young with her husband Khalid. Their children Taarik and Nadia, are born in England. Taarik is an accomplished sportsman and very good in his studies. Both Sean and Taarik feel that the Western world doesn't correspond to their aspirations of absolute, of idealism and holiness. Omar, a Syrian who comes often to visit their campus at the British university where they both study, is in reality a recruiter for ISIS. He creates an Islamic confraternity and invites the two young men to be part of it. Sean and Taarik are fascinated by Omar, who shows them propaganda trailers and gives them books with the Prophet's sayings. But more to the point he gives them rules, a thing the young men need, but they don't find in the Western society, where neither the school, nor the family are able anymore to give rules, but only “weak thought” and destructive politically correct notions. The two young men decide to go to Syria. But here their paths diverge dramatically. While Taarik finds what he was looking for and aspires to become a martyr, Sean is disappointed to find out that the women are treated like merchandise and that the “movement” makes money with drugs. Despite the fact that he converts to Islam, his critical attitude towards the actions of the man he admired so much, bothers Omar, who decides that Sean (whose new name is Farid) will never be a good Muslim. In the meanwhile, the two mothers live their private hell, questioned by the anti-terrorist police, fired from their jobs, abandoned by their friends and families. All that because of the decision their sons have taken. Their friendship starts at the support group organized by Doctor Diana Fortis, where they meet other parents in their situation.

== Cast ==
- Remo Girone as Eric
- Rupert Wynne-James as Father Emmanuel
- Victoria Zinny as Dr. Diana Fortis
- Mara Gualandris as Angela
- Margherita Remotti as Fatima
- Francesco Riva as Sean
- Francesco Meola as Taarik
- Sergio Leone as Khalid
- Christopher Lambert
