= Rock Paper Scissors (2013 film) =

- Theatrical poster
- French: Roche papier ciseaux
- Directed by: Yan Lanouette Turgeon
- Written by: Yan Lanouette Turgeon, André Gulluni (consultant: Valérie Beaugrand-Champagne)
- Produced by: Christine Falco
- Starring: Roy Dupuis; Remo Girone; Samian; Roger Léger; Frédéric Chau; Fanny Mallette; Marie-Hélène Thibault; Réjean Lefrançois; Louis Champagne; France Pilotte; Victoria Zinny
- Cinematography: Jonathan Decoste
- Edited by: Carina Baccanale
- Music by: Ramachandra Borcar
- Production company: Camera Oscura
- Distributed by: Filmoption International
- Release date: 21 February 2013 (RCVQ)
- Running time: 117 minutes
- Country: Canada
- Language: French
- Budget: C$3 million
- Box office: C$107,000 (Québec)

Rock Paper Scissors (French: Roche papier ciseaux) is a 2013 Canadian thriller film from Québec directed by Yan Lanouette Turgeon, which he co-wrote with André Gulluni. The third film to be produced by Camera Oscura (after Marc Bisaillon's well-received La vérité and La lâcheté), producer Christine Falco described it as a work of hyperlink cinema (film choral). Lanouette Turgeon's debut feature is the story of three men—Boucane (Samian), Lorenzo (Remo Girone), and Vincent (Roy Dupuis)—whose lives are brought together through a strange sequence of events.

The film features music by composer and performer Ramachandra Borcar (also known as Ramasutra or DJ Ram).

== Plot ==
A young Aboriginal, Boucane, whose home life is mostly broken, leaves his reserve one summer night: freedom and a better life await him in Montréal. With only a bag containing clothes and a few possessions he heads south. He hooks up for a lift with Normand, a quirky old gangster whose truck contains suspicious cargo.

Lorenzo is an old Italian immigrant on his last dime, walking the streets in search of scrap metal that he then tries to sell in order to survive. His wife Rosa Maria has Alzheimer's and Lorenzo's goal is to fulfill the promise he made to Rosa Maria—to return her body for burial in Italy. His efforts at raising money for the trip are not enough.

Vincent, a doctor stripped of his medical license, works for the Chinese mafia, treating a clientele of thugs he secretly despises, while managing the organization's pharmaceutical needs. He is married and a few months away from becoming a father; the double life eats away at him. He is desperately seeking a way out.

Originally from France, Shaw Mue-Fan, known as "Muffin", is the common strand bringing these three men together. Well placed within the criminal organization, he is an enforcer with a knack for building alliances which has made him the youngest right arm in the history of the Montréal Triads.

Their fates collide on the night of a lunar eclipse beginning with a new kind of Russian roulette.

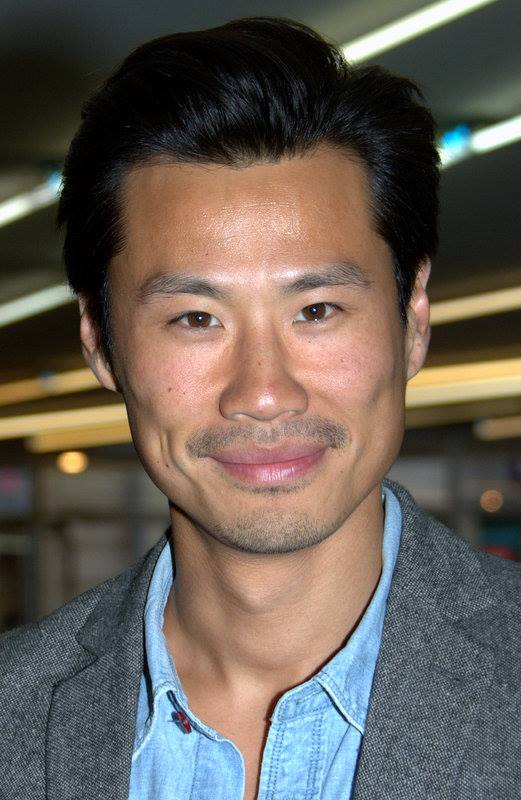
Frédéric Chau in 2014

== Cast ==
- Roy Dupuis as Vincent
- Remo Girone as Lorenzo Fumetti
- Samian as Boucane
- Roger Léger as Normand Labonté
- Frédéric Chau as Muffin
- Fanny Mallette
- Marie-Hélène Thibault as Beverly
- Réjean Lefrançois as Jovial
- Louis Champagne as Bobby
- France Pilotte as Pierrette
- Victoria Zinny as Rosa Maria

== Genres, style, and influences ==
Lanouette Turgeon and Gulluni had a hard time categorizing the film's genre themselves, the director saying the phrase "dark fairy-tale" (fable noire) came up at one point, because it corresponds well to the conventions of the thriller, and because while their past short film collaborations have also been quite dark, Rock Paper Scissors has a lighter side to it due to the presence of the element of random chance (le hasard). Several different genres have been used by critics to describe the film, from simple drama to black comedy and film polar, a francophone subgenre of mystery or detective film (drame policier). Charles-Henri Ramond suggests the film is reminiscent of the Québec B-movie films polars of the 1970s, particularly Denys Arcand's La maudite galette and Jacques Godbout's La gammick.

The film's title refers not only to the game Rock–paper–scissors but also stands for the three main characters in their respective story or character arcs, each filmed in a different style: Rock is Boucane's story (he wears a good-luck charm made from a stone), filmed in wide-open spaces, with elements of Western movies; Paper is Lorenzo's story (the "paper" he seeks is the money he desperately needs), filmed in warmer colours, accompanied by classical music and a stable frame; finally, Scissors is Vincent's story, marked by cold colours, chrome in particular, and shot with a hand-held camera.

The filmmakers, being great admirers of other films, in particular directors like Alejandro González Iñárritu and the Coen Brothers, included many nods to other films: the drug injection scene is inspired by the Russian roulette scene in Michael Cimino's The Deer Hunter, while the scene in which Boucane learns to shoot at bottles is an homage to Francis Mankiewicz's Le Temps d’une chasse. The overall form of the film was inspired by González Inárritu's masterwork Amores perros. A certain amount of the Paper part of the film is influenced by the films of Jean-Pierre Jeunet, while the way the Triads are presented is greatly influenced by Park Chan-wook's Old Boy.

== Production ==
=== Writing and casting ===
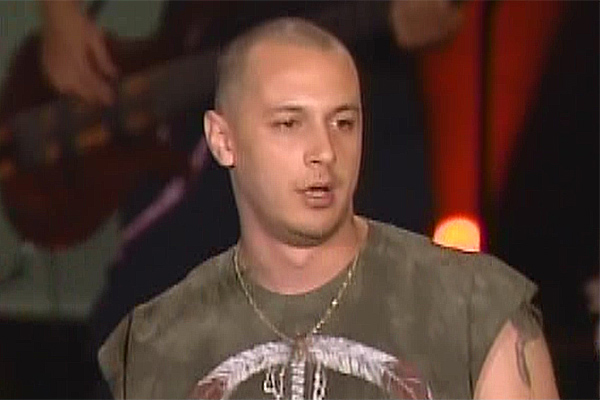
Samian

The director and his co-writer began working on Rock Paper Scissors after they had produced a pair of successful short films, Papillons noirs and Le revenant, after which Gulluni approached Lanouette Turgeon with a title and an idea for three different films which would be linked by their supporting characters; they quickly realized they could make a single feature if they worked hard enough on the script. They had to find something which would connect the three main characters, which was "easier said than done", as the entire process took them eight years with the re-writes.

The idea for the Aboriginal story was occurred shortly after Lanouette Turgeon met Algonquin rapper Samian at a film festival in France in 2005. The character was inspired directly from his own life: like Boucane, Samian left the First Nations reserve of Pikogan (near Amos) with a sack on his back to try his luck in Montréal, working regular jobs before making his name in music. Samian, who had to lose thirty pounds for the role (and some five years), only found out four years after the meeting that Lanouette Turgeon had effectively written a role based on his life. He agreed that Boucane, which is his first acting role, is a lot like him, and like many young Aboriginals who go to Montréal to start a new life, and find it is not easy.

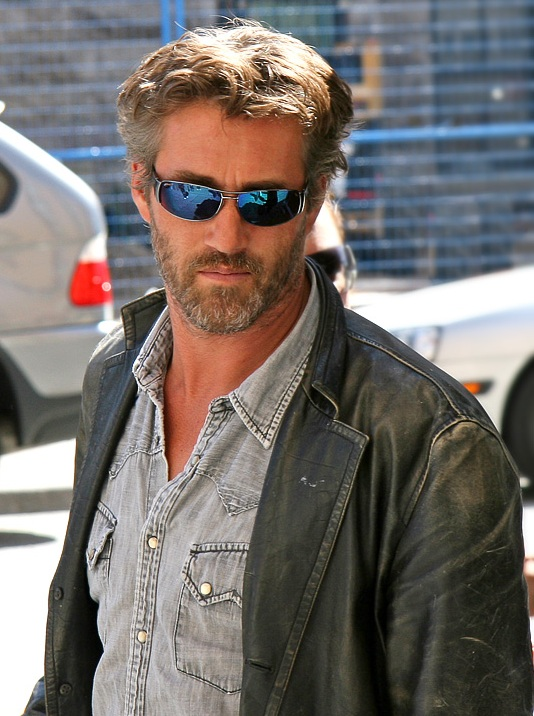
Roy Dupuis

To find an Italian francophone actor who was also the right age to play Lorenzo, the team went to France and held auditions, there being relatively few such actors in Québec. When veteran Italian stage and film actor Remo Girone auditioned for the part, Lanouette Turgeon knew immediately he had found the right actor; then, Girone's wife, Victoria Zinny, came in carrying a few DVDs of Girone's previous films, and the director asked if they would mind doing a screen test together. It "gave him the shivers" (frissons) to see them bringing his characters to life. The rest of his team felt the same.

Roy Dupuis was on board as soon as he had read the script. He liked the idea of the film starting with an Aboriginal in the "Grand Nord" moving slowly towards the cosmopolitan city of Montréal where everyone is just trying to get by. Dupuis considers the film daring and genuinely poetic.

In writing the story of Boucane and his trip with Normand, Lanouette Turgeon immediately thought of Roger Léger to play him. Léger called it a great and nuanced character.

Despite her long acting career, Rock Paper Scissors marked the first appearance by Marie-Hélène Thibault in a feature film. Her scenes as Beverley were shot in three days.

=== Financing ===
Funding for Rock Paper Scissors was secured in May 2011, in large part due to the involvement of star Roy Dupuis, who said that when he finds a project that strikes him as a piece of auteur cinema, he uses his influence to see to it the film gets made. The film received funding from Téléfilm Canada, SODEC, the Harold Greenberg Foundation (Bell Media), Société Radio-Canada, Fonds Quebecor, Astral Media, and Super Écran, as well as the Government of Canada in the form of a tax credit for Canadian film or video.

=== Filming ===
Principal photography took place in the city of Montréal and the surrounding area, as well as in the James Bay region, between 6 May to 2 June 2012, (26 days). In Montréal, scenes were shot in Chinatown, in the former Chinese Hospital in Villeray, and the area east of the Island. The film was shot with a projection ratio of 1:2.35, with the support of DCP and HDCAM SR.

=== Music ===
Ramachandra Borcar's score features music ranging from orchestral pieces for strings and brass instruments, to guitars and female vocals reminiscent of spaghetti Westerns, Chinese musical instruments, flamenco guitar, and electronic music, performed by thirty musicians including Richard White, Jonathan Cummins, Mikey Heppner, Lowell Campbell, Liu Fang, Phil Hornsey, and Borcar himself playing an array of rare electronic instruments like the swarmatron, modified omnichords and VCS3. The score was written in three different musical genres, each developed to flow with the script's three different stories. The main styles are: music inspired by spaghetti Westerns for Boucane's story, a more operatic sound with a large string orchestra for Lorenzo, and electro-acoustic music for Vincent. In an interview, Borcar admits he was not always sure it was working; his intention was for the styles to blend together as the stories came together: the spaghetti Western music transforms into a waltz.

In addition to the score, the film features several other instrumental pieces, including three by the Budos Band and two composed by Gabriel Fauré. Of particular significance is a selection from his Pavane, which plays during a key emotional moment: it is a piece which haunted Lanouette Turgeon during the eight years of work on the project, and for him, is inseparable from the character of Lorenzo.

== Release ==
The film's world premiere was as the opening feature at the 31st Rendez-vous du cinéma québécois, which is held in Montréal and Québec City, on 21 February 2013, at the Imperial Cinema in Montréal; it was released in theatres the next day, 22 February 2013.

=== Home media ===
A DVD was released in Québec on 11 June 2013, in the original French with English subtitles.

=== Soundtrack ===
A soundtrack album was released on 22 February 2013 from Semprini Records. It is also currently available on Spotify and iTunes.

==== Track listing ====
No.	Title	Length
1.	"Le Nord"	1:46
2.	"Ciseaux"	3:04
3.	"Attente"	2:20
4.	"Papier"	2:20
5.	"Roche"	1:00
6.	"L'église"	2:03
7.	"Mon inuit"	2:54
8.	"Un trois temps pour le cœur"	2:23
9.	"Un corps avant l'autre"	3:44
10.	"La livraison / Quatre roues"	1:53
11.	"Roche-papier-ciseaux"	4:50
12.	"La roulette"	5:48

== Reception ==
=== Commercial performance ===
Rock Paper Scissors was the fifth-highest-grossing film of the year in the province of Quebec by mid August 2013, collecting $107,000 in box office receipts.

=== Critical response ===
Shirley Noel calls the film daring and finds the script and its actors believable, and wishes that Samian and Léger's characters could have had a road movie feature on their own. Philippe Michaud gives the film 4.5 stars, saying the film captivates from beginning to end, impressed by the fact that often not a word is spoken, the camera resting on the face of an actor whose expression says everything, like in a spaghetti Western. Maxime Labreque says Lanouette Turgeon is a master filmmaker for managing the three interwoven stories, with different styles and film genres, the key to such a film being in its alternating scenes, timed, not systematically, but for the sake of better developing the stories. Annie Tanguay gives the film a 7.5/10, saying that despite being "Hollywood" kind of genre film, it is not very predictable.

Malcolm Fraser, writing for Cult MTL, says the director has a good command of suspense and atmosphere, opining that the film is at its best "in its quiet moments; the plot with Samian and Léger is the strongest, with the relationship between the two men building slowly and subtly". He is also impressed by the realistic portrayal of the criminal world, where characters regret their decisions yet feel they have no choice but to continue a life of crime. The film's main flaw is a common one, the interweaving of too many storylines. Reviewing the film for Le Devoir, Odile Tremblay found the film well put together, despite a few unrealistic elements and missing linkages. The acting is exceptional, the camera work imaginative, and the sets alternately wonderfully kitsch or blood-curdling, while Ramachandra Borcar's score, here classical, there exotically themed, keeps the action going without overwhelming it.

Brendan Kelly, writing for the Montreal Gazette, assigns the film 3.5 stars, stating at the start that while it is "by no means a perfect film", he admires its ambition and found many brilliant moments reminiscent of Quentin Tarantino at his best, while the "many fine actors" are "at the top of their game"; "things go a little bit off the rails in the late going, but up until then Lanouette Turgeon does a bang-up job of juggling these various narrative threads, and the drama has real emotional force." Francine Gaulin also gives the film 3.5 stars, noting the director's surprising mastery, stating the film's one weakness is a tendency to unnatural, expository dialogue. Assigning the film 3 stars, Charles-Henri Ramond calls it an enjoyable B-movie which reflects the social and ethnic reality of modern Québec, at times vascillating between a horror film and a psychological thriller which loses its way during the Russian roulette sequence somewhat, faulting it for having a fairly predictable ending. Jonathan Quesnel says the debut feature is done with panache, style and talent, borrowing here and there from, say, Wong Kar-wai or the Cohen Brothers, depicting a tableau of dark human despair with stunning aplomb; but the multiplicity of genres is also the film's weakness, undermining its coherence and integrity with so many stylistic nods to so many of the director's beloved films, rendering the tone uneven and less hard-hitting than it could be in the end. Yet, he thinks there is no doubt this is a promising filmmaker. Boris Nonveiller feels the film is neither really bad nor really good, the script being its weakest point, but still a good effort for a first film.

=== Accolades ===
- Jutra Award for Best Original Score (16th Jutra Awards, 2014) (Ramachandra Borcar)

The film was also nominated for Canadian Screen Award for Best Original Score at the 2nd Canadian Screen Awards, but lost to Enemy.
