= Garden of Delights (film) =

1967 film

- Directed by: Silvano Agosti
- Written by: Silvano Agosti
- Produced by: Enzo Doria
- Starring: Maurice Ronet; Evelyn Stewart; Lea Massari
- Cinematography: Aldo Scavarda
- Edited by: Silvano Agosti
- Music by: Ennio Morricone
- Release date: 1967
- Language: Italian

Garden of Delights (Italian: Il giardino delle delizie) is a 1967 Italian drama film written and directed by Silvano Agosti, at his directorial debut.

== Cast ==
- Maurice Ronet as Carlo
- Evelyn Stewart as Carla
- Lea Massari as the Woman in the Hotel
- Ruggero Miti

== Production ==
The film was heavily cut from censorship and producers, with the final result being very different from the original. Following this experience, Agosti decided to self-produce all his following films.

== Reception ==
The film has been described as "a loose string of quasi-autonomous images" in which "this emphasis on disjointed imagery becomes both a self-conscious alternative to classical storytelling and a thematisation of an existentialist experience of the palpable yet mysterious presence of both living and inanimate things".

According to Italian film critic Paolo Mereghetti the film is "a classic depiction of alienation", with Antonioni's and Fellini's influences, as well as "a grotesque, violent, and blasphemous flavor that echoes Bellocchio's Fists in the Pocket".
