= Shades of Truth (film) =

- Italian: Sfumature di verità
- Directed by: Liana Marabini
- Written by: Liana Marabini
- Starring: David Wall; Gedeon Burkhard; Jennifer Mischiati; Roberto Zibetti; Maria Pia Ruspoli; Victoria Zinny; Marie-Christine Barrault; Remo Girone; Giancarlo Giannini; Christopher Lambert
- Release date: 2 March 2015 (Italy)
- Countries: Italy, UK
- Language: Italian

Shades of Truth is an Italian movie, created and directed by Liana Marabini in 2015, about the life of Pope Pius XII and his relation with Nazi Germany. Its world premiere took place at the Vatican City on March 2, 2015, marking the anniversary of the birth of Eugenio Pacelli in 1876 and his appointment as Pope Pius XII in 1939. It was released in movie theaters all over the world in April 2015 and screened at the Cannes Film Festival in May of the same year. According to the director, Liana Marabini, Pope Pius XII saved at least 800,000 Jews.

== Cast ==
- David Wall as David Milano
- Gedeon Burkhard
- Jennifer Mischiati as Sarah
- Roberto Zibetti as Pope Pius XII
- Maria Pia Ruspoli
- Victoria Zinny
- Marie-Christine Barrault as Sister Maria Angelica
- Remo Girone
- Giancarlo Giannini as Aaron Azulai
- Christopher Lambert as Cardinal Ennio Salvemini
