= Nastro d'Argento Lifetime Achievement Award =

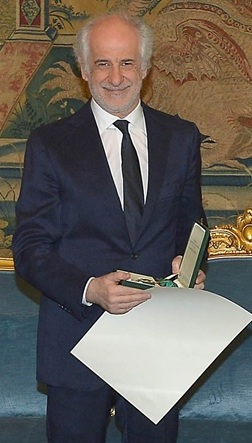
President Giorgio Napolitano receives the cast of the Oscar-winning film "The Great Beauty" at the Quirinale

The Nastro d'Argento (Silver Ribbon) is a film award assigned annually, since 1946, by Sindacato Nazionale dei Giornalisti Cinematografici Italiani ("Italian National Syndicate of Film Journalists") the association of Italian film critics.

This is the list of Nastro d'Argento awards for Lifetime Achievement.

== Recipients ==
- 1984 - Carlo Ludovico Bragaglia
- 1995 - Michelangelo Antonioni, Sophia Loren and Alberto Sordi
- 1996 - Ingmar Bergman
- 1998 - Nino Baragli
- 2001 - Armando Trovajoli
- 2003 - Luis Bacalov
- 2005 - Suso Cecchi d'Amico and Mario Monicelli
- 2006 - Stefania Sandrelli
- 2007 - Dino Risi
- 2008 - Piero De Bernardi, Giuliano Gemma, Carlo Lizzani and Vittorio Storaro
- 2010 - Ugo Gregoretti, Gilles Jacob, Ilaria Occhini and Armando Trovajoli
- 2011 - Emidio Greco, Fulvio Lucisano and Marina Piperno
- 2013 - Roberto Herlitzka
- 2014 - Marina Cicogna, Francesco Rosi and Piero Tosi
- 2018 - Gigi Proietti
- 2019 - Silvano Agosti
- 2020 - Toni Servillo

== See also ==
- Cinema of Italy
