= Vittorio Sgarbi =

Italian art critic, politician, and television personality (born 1952)

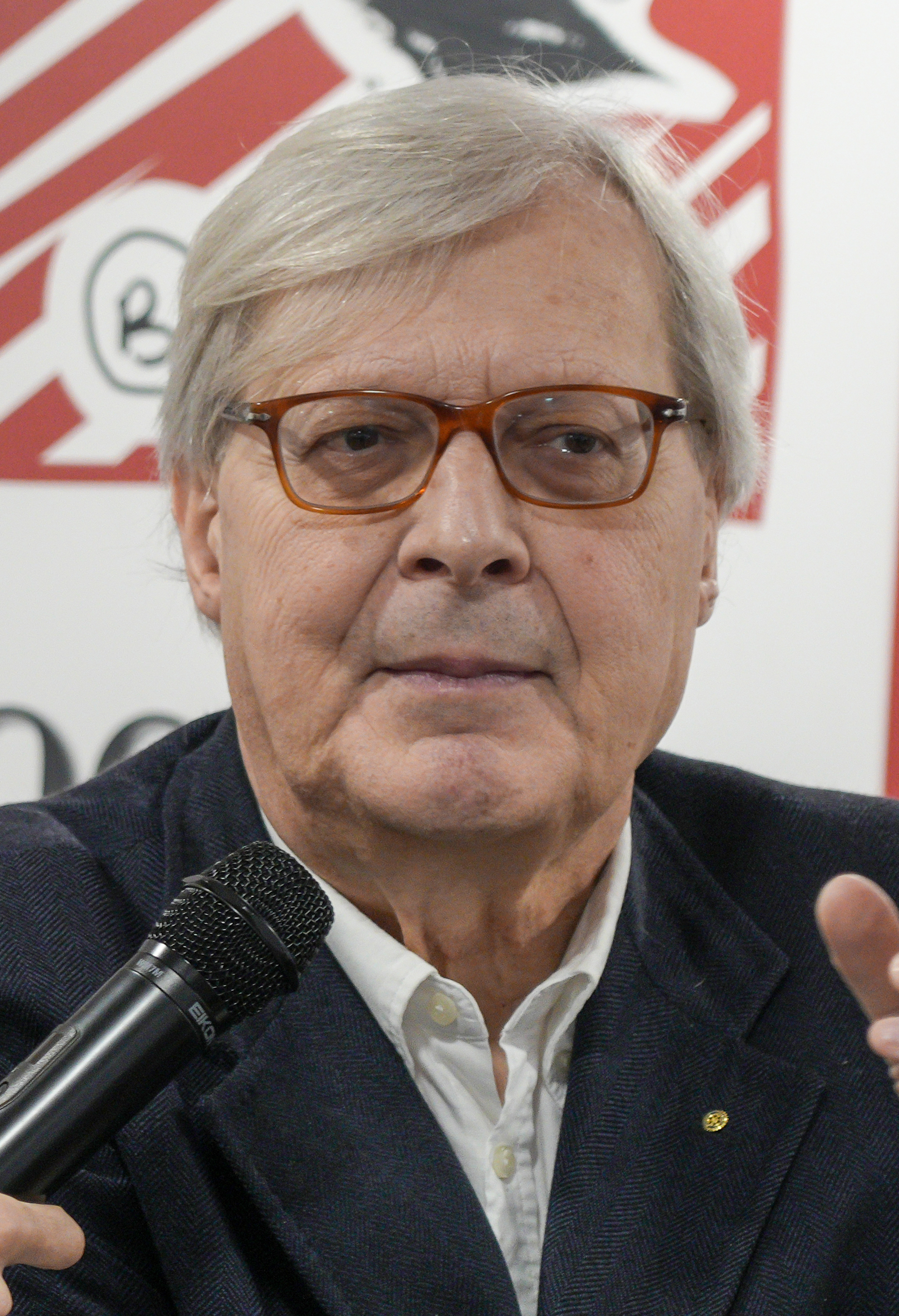
- Sgarbi in 2022

Member of the Chamber of Deputies
- In office 23 March 2018 – 13 October 2022
- Constituency: Emilia-Romagna 2
- In office 23 April 1992 – 27 April 2006
- Constituency: Cagliari (1992–1994); Calabria (1994–2001); Veneto 1 (2001–2006)

Member of the European Parliament
- In office 20 July 1999 – 11 June 2001
- Constituency: North-East Italy
Municipal offices
Mayor of Arpino
Incumbent
Assumed office 15 May 2023
Preceded by	Renato Rea
Mayor of Sutri
In office 11 June 2018 – 15 May 2023
Preceded by	Guido Cianti
Succeeded by	Matteo Amori
Mayor of Salemi
In office 30 June 2008 – 15 February 2012
Preceded by	Biagio Mastrantoni
Succeeded by	Domenico Venuti
Mayor of San Severino Marche
In office 9 December 1992 – 24 December 1993
Preceded by	Alduino Pelagalli
Succeeded by	Manlio Rossi

Personal details
- Born: Vittorio Umberto Antonio Maria Sgarbi; 8 May 1952 (age 73) Ferrara, Italy
- Party: Renaissance (since 2017)
- Other political affiliations: See list
- Height: 1.78 m (5 ft 10 in)
- Profession: Art critic; Academic; Writer
- Website: Official website

Vittorio Umberto Antonio Maria Sgarbi (born 8 May 1952) is an Italian art critic, art historian, writer, politician, cultural commentator, and television personality. He is president of the Museum of Modern and Contemporary Art of Trento and Rovereto. Appointed curator of the Italian Pavilion at the 2011 Venice Biennale, Sgarbi is also a columnist for il Giornale and works as an art critic for Panorama and IO Donna. A popular eclectic and mediatic phenomenon, Sgarbi is well known for his glib, verbal aggressiveness, and insults, which often led to libels.

A multi-time member of the Italian Parliament, Sgarbi is best known for his mayoralty terms in several cities (San Severino Marche, Salemi, Sutri, and Arpino) across different Italian regions (Marche, Sicily, and Lazio). He is also well-known for his many party switches, starting in the Italian Socialist Party in 1990, before switching to the Italian Liberal Party in 1992 and joining Silvio Berlusconi and his centre-right coalition party Forza Italia in 1994, and to other minor liberal and centre-right parties, including founding its own parties in 1999, 2012, and 2017 (The Liberals Sgarbi, the Party of the Revolution, and Renaissance). In 2018, he returned to the 2013-refounded Forza Italia. After a failed Senate bid in 2022, he was appointed undersecretary for culture in the Meloni Cabinet.

== Early life and education ==
Sgarbi was born in Ferrara, Emilia Romagna, in 1952. The son of pharmacists Giuseppe Sgarbi (1921–2018) and Rina Cavallini (1926–2015), he has a younger sister, Elisabetta Sgarbi (born 1956), an Italian film producer and writer. Sgarbi grew up in Ro Ferrarese and attended the Classical Lyceum named after Ludovico Ariosto. Sgarbi then graduated in Philosophy cum laude at the University of Bologna, where he also specialized in History of Art. After his graduation, Sgarbi taught History of Photography (1974–1978) and History of Artistic Techniques (1984–1988) before entering politics in 1992.

== Career ==
An eclectic, controversial, and often discussed character, Sgarbi has built his career around art but also covered heterogeneous roles and positions in different sectors, publishing numerous works. Sgarbi made his debut on national television as an art expert on the Maurizio Costanzo Show on Canale 5. In the 1990s, he had his own show, Sgarbi quotidiani, which was a pun on his name that can be read as "Daily Sgarbi" or "Daily Offences". The show was a 15-minute recapitulation of current events. On a few episodes, Sgarbi furiously attacked the Italian judges working on the Tangentopoli corruption scandal, and criticized the use of preventive detention in prison; in particular, he declared that many people had been arrested without a proper warrant and that some innocent people had been unjustly accused, and denounced what he saw as the excessive power of investigative magistrates, the severe Article 41-bis prison regime, and the damage done to the regional economy by organized crime investigations. He visited Giuseppe Piromalli, a boss of the 'Ndrangheta in Calabria, in prison.

During a 1991 appearance in a television show presented by Giuliano Ferrara, Sgarbi and Roberto D'Agostino's exchanges of insults culminated in D'Agostino slapping Sgarbi. Years later, the two made peace. Sgarbi also became famous for repeatedly shouting capra ("goat"), which was first uttered during the 23 March 1989 episode of the Maurizio Costanzo Show, as a way to avoid libels due to his insulting language. Years later, capra made it into the title of a book by Sgarbi and published by Baldini+Castoldi. In a series of interviews given on 15–19 July 1994 to Avvenire and il Giornale, Sgarbi described the Mani pulite judges, who were working on the Tangentopoli scandal, as murderers and part of a criminal association. Due to the use of those words, Sgarbi was convicted of libel, a sentence that was confirmed by Italy's Supreme Court of Cassation; he was sentenced to pay €60,000. Sgarbi had said: "Di Pietro, Colombo, Davigo, and the others are murderers who made people die. They must be tried and arrested. They are a criminal association with the freedom to kill. It is right that they leave, no one will regret them. They go to church to pray for all those people they caused to die: Moroni, Gardini, Cicogna, Cagliari. They have all these crosses on their conscience. I thank God that, with this decree [Biondi Decree], they will themselves avoid arrest for all the murders they have committed."

In 1992, the year after Tangentopoli, Sgarbi was elected mayor of San Severino Marche with the Italian Socialist Party and member of the Chamber of Deputies in the Cagliari constituency with the Italian Liberal Party. In 1994, Sgarbi joined Forza Italia, the new-founded party of Silvio Berlusconi. As part of the Pole of Good Government, he campaigned actively in Southern Italy for judicial reforms after Tangentopoli, such as the failed Biondi Decree. As a member of Forza Italia, he carried out much parliamentary activity, including being president of the 7th Culture, Science, and Education Commission of the Chamber of Deputies from 1994 to 1996, elected a member of the European Parliament in 1999, and the undersecretary for cultural heritage and activities from 2001 to 2002. About the state of art in 2002, Sgarbi said: "I don't think cinema and theatre are essential to humanity... No one goes to see Italian films because they stink."

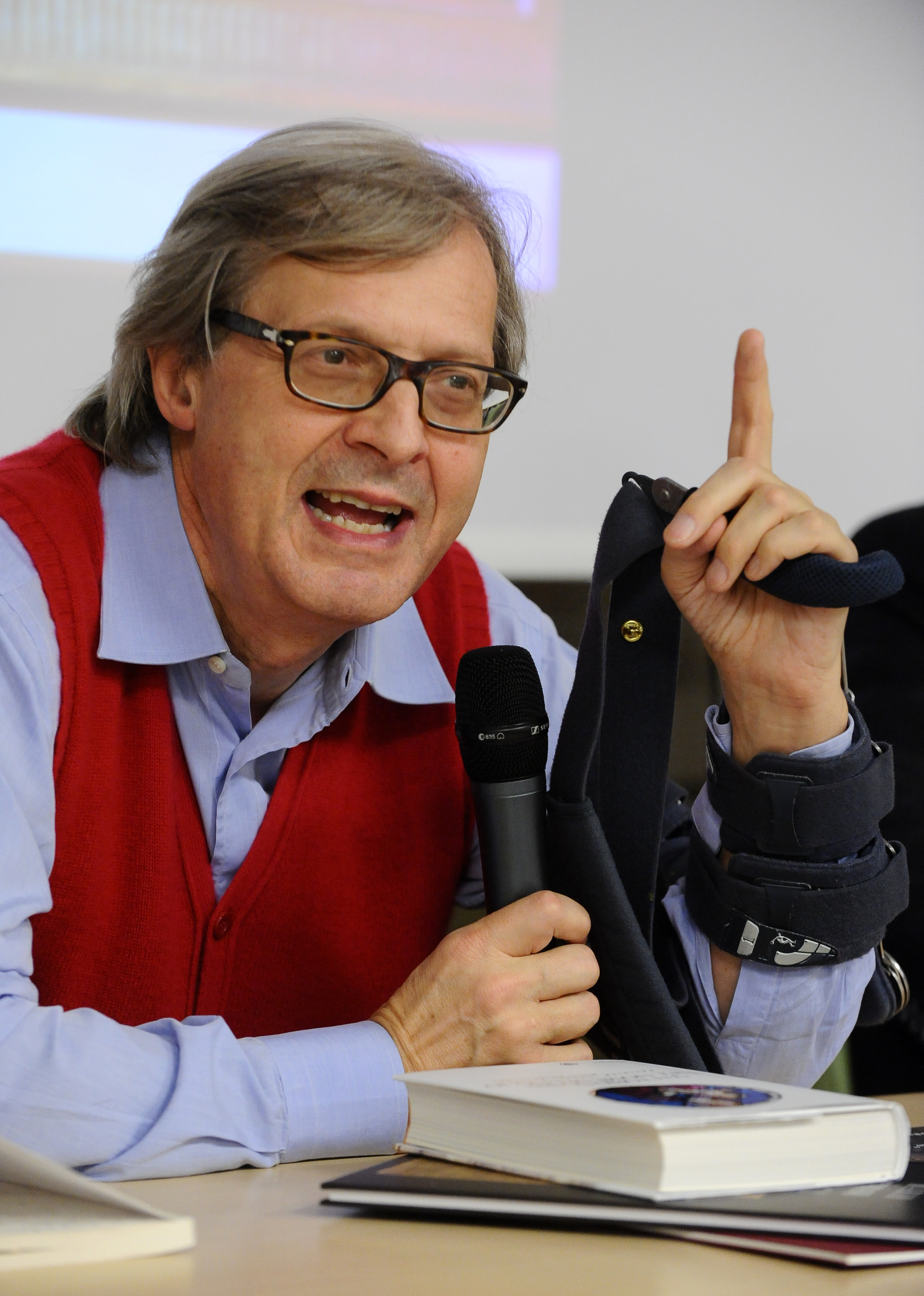
Sgarbi in 2012

In 2006, Sgarbi obtained the culture department of the municipality of Milan, a position he held until 2008. In 2008, Sgarbi served as Cabinet Member for Culture, Arts, and Sports in Milan's municipal government for six months when mayor Letizia Moratti terminated his mandate as she saw him "unfit for the job". That same year, supported by the 2002-refounded Christian Democracy and the Union of the Centre parties, Sgarbi became mayor of the Sicilian city of Salemi, a position from which he resigned in February 2012. In an attempt to re-populate the city since the 1968 Belice earthquake that hit Salemi's ancient centre, parts of which date back more than 1,000 years to the Islamic occupation, under the suggestion of photographer and friend Oliviero Toscani, Sgarbi proposed to give historic houses for €1 each. While mayor of Salemi, Sgarbi was removed from his role and the administration of the city was commissioned after he failed to acknowledge Sicilian Mafia interferences in his cabinet. According to the then interior minister Anna Maria Cancellieri, Sgarbi had responsibilities for the infiltration of mafia in the management of the city, for example through the creation of fake protocols and making the administrative process slower. Sgarbi later recalled it was "a mistake", saying: "The mafia was based on silence; from Buscetta onwards, in Sicily it is archaeology: it is no coincidence that I opened the mafia museum. In your opinion, what is the mafia doing in Salemi? The mafia goes where the money is. In Milan. In Moscow."

During his career, Sgarbi was superintendent for the Venetian Museum Complex from 2010 to 2011 and curator of numerous artistic events, including the 2011 Venice Biennale, where he was appointed curator of the Italian Pavilion. In 2013, he left the presidency of the Accademia di Belle Arti di Urbino, a position he had held since 2003. In 2015, Sgarbi formalized his mayor of Milan candidacy for the 2016 Italian local elections. In February 2016, four months before the election, he renounced to his bid and criticized the centre-right coalition candidate Stefano Parisi. In November 2017, Sgarbi was chosen by the centre-right coalition Sicilian president-elect Nello Musumeci as new Regional Assessor of Cultural Heritage. Sgarbi was re-elected as member of Parliament for Forza Italia for the 2018 Italian general election. With the Renaissance party he founded in 2017, Sgarbi was elected as mayor of Sutri later in June 2018.

On 17 November 2019, Sgarbi was one of the speakers at the conference entitled "The Breaking Down of Ideological Frontiers and the Fight Against Prejudice", organized in the Sala Arpa in Terni by the cultural association Magna Grecia Viva with the presence of Stefano Bisi, the Grand Master of the Grand Orient of Italy. The other speakers were Paolo Mieli and Mogol. Sgarbi's speech was entitled "Politically Correct and Politically Incorrect". Sgarbi was critical of the handling of the COVID-19 pandemic in Italy by the government and of the Green Pass. In 2022, he presented the symbol of #IoApro Rinascimento with the group of restaurateurs and traders disobedient to the restrictions imposed by the government and the obligation of the Green Pass. Sgarbi was a candidate to the Senate of the Republic in the 2022 Italian general election but was not elected. In the Meloni Cabinet that ensued, he was undersecretary for culture from 2022 to 2024. In 2023, Sgarbi was elected mayor of Arpino with the Renaissance civic list. As the undersecretary of culture, Sgarbi said in August 2023 that some of Italy's top jobs should be reserved for Italians and that the Meloni government had introduced stricter criteria in the hiring process over the language skills of applicants.

== Political party affiliations ==
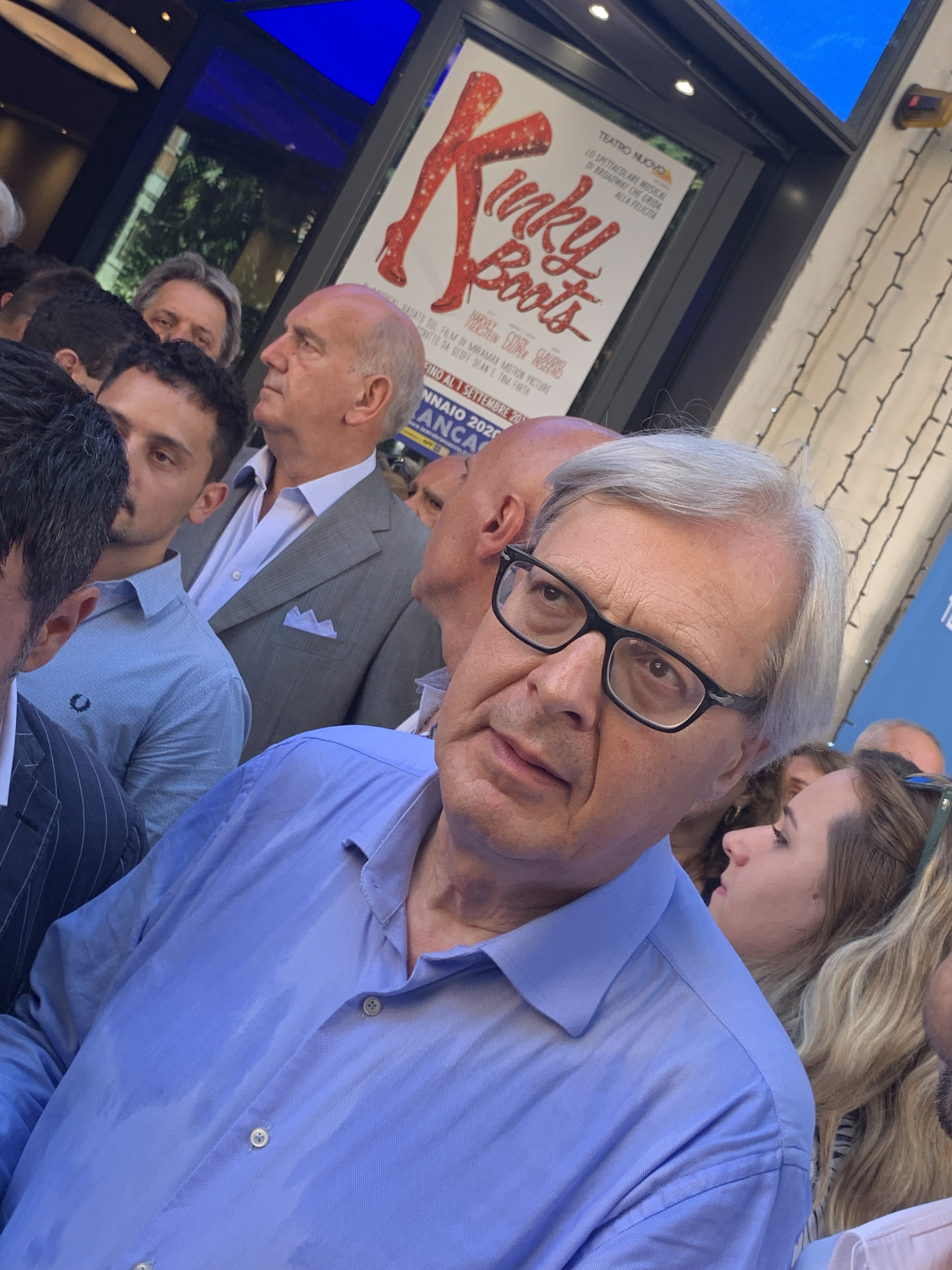
Sgarbi in 2019

Sgarbi is well known for his many political party affiliations. Due to his many party switches, Sgarbi is labelled Italy's greatest trasformista. In his youth, Sgarbi was a member of the Italian Monarchist Union. He was later associated with the Italian Communist Party after accepting the proposal to run for Pesaro's city council in 1990, a candidacy that failed due to having simultaneously also accepted the proposal for the Italian Socialist Party (PSI); this led to the withdrawal of both candidacies. With the PSI, he was elected deputy and municipal councilor of San Severino Marche in 1990. Through a Christian Democracy–Italian Social Movement alliance, he was elected mayor of San Severino Marche in 1992. He was first elected deputy in 1992 through the Italian Liberal Party (PLI), and then re-elected in 1994, 1996, and 2001 with Forza Italia and re-elected in 2018 with the new Forza Italia established in 2013.

In 1995, Sgarbi co-founded the Federalist Union, which he left to join the Pannella–Sgarbi List but abandoned it before the 1996 elections, being re-elected with Forza Italia through the Pole of Good Government. He founded a new party, The Liberals Sgarbi, in 1999. In 2000, Sgarbi established the Secular Pole to guarantee representation in the following year's elections for the PLI and the Radical Party, with which he was allied as part of Berlusconi's coalition in 1996. In 2004, he joined the Italian Republican Party. In 2006, Sgarbi ran for the Consumers' List, which was part of The Union, the centre-left coalition that narrowly defeated Berlusconi, whom he once defined as the "anal birth caused by Di Pietro", without being elected. That same year, he became municipal councilor after being appointed as assessor of culture by the then centre-right coalition mayor of Milan, Letizia Moratti, with whom he would have stormy relations.

In 2008, an alliance between the 2002-refounded Christian Democracy and the Union of the Centre parties led to his election as mayor of Salemi. Sgarbi was the unsuccessful candidate for the Movement for Autonomy in the 2009 European Parliament election in Italy through The Autonomy electoral list in the Italian Islands constituency and for the Liberals Sgarbi Network – Reformists in the 2010 Lazio regional election. On 14 July 2012, the 223rd anniversary of the storming of the Bastille at the beginning of the French Revolution, Sgarbi founded the Party of the Revolution – Sgarbi Laboratory, with which he unsuccessfully ran for re-election as mayor of Salemi in May 2014. In 2013, Sgarbi joined the Popular Agreement party of Giampiero Catone. Alongside Giulio Tremonti, Sgarbi founded Renaissance in 2017, initially running for president of Sicily, before switching his support to eventual centre-right coalition winner Nello Musumeci. In 2018, Renaissance federated with Forza Italia but subsequently returned to being an autonomous political group that presented itself at a local level over the years. In 2022, Sgarbi joined the Us Moderates electoral list. In 2023, a common list Us Moderates – Sgarbi Renaissance was presented at the regional elections in Lazio and Lombardy.

== Political and religious views ==
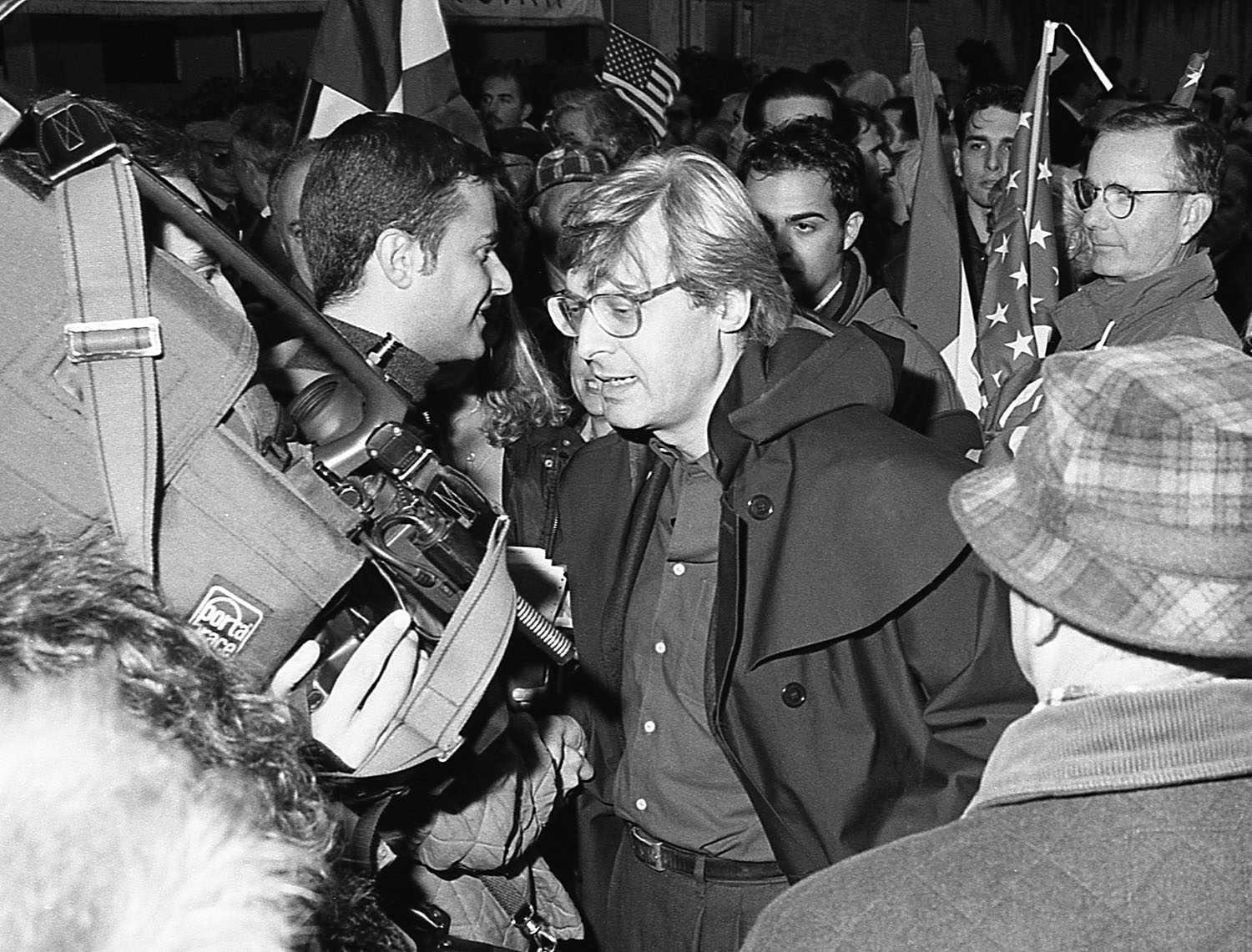
Sgarbi at a pro-American demonstration in 2001

Politically a liberal within the centre-right coalition, Sgarbi is associated with liberal conservatism, federalism, and economic liberalism. He called himself liberale ("liberal") and libertario ("libertarian"), in the mold of Marco Pannella. In 2017, Sgarbi said: "Replacing ideology with culture is the only future for the survival of good politics at the service of good governance. We are witnessing the destruction of the physiognomy of our cities. Beauty, unfortunately, is a legacy of the past; the urban planning objective of modern times seems to be only that of the construction of 'ugly buildings'. We need to go back to the Renaissance, when there was a 'commissioning power' that left free initiative to the artist, the only constraint was that represented by the creation of 'beautiful things'. What many call 'regime art' is 'state art' that preserves the characteristics and feelings of the climate of the current era."

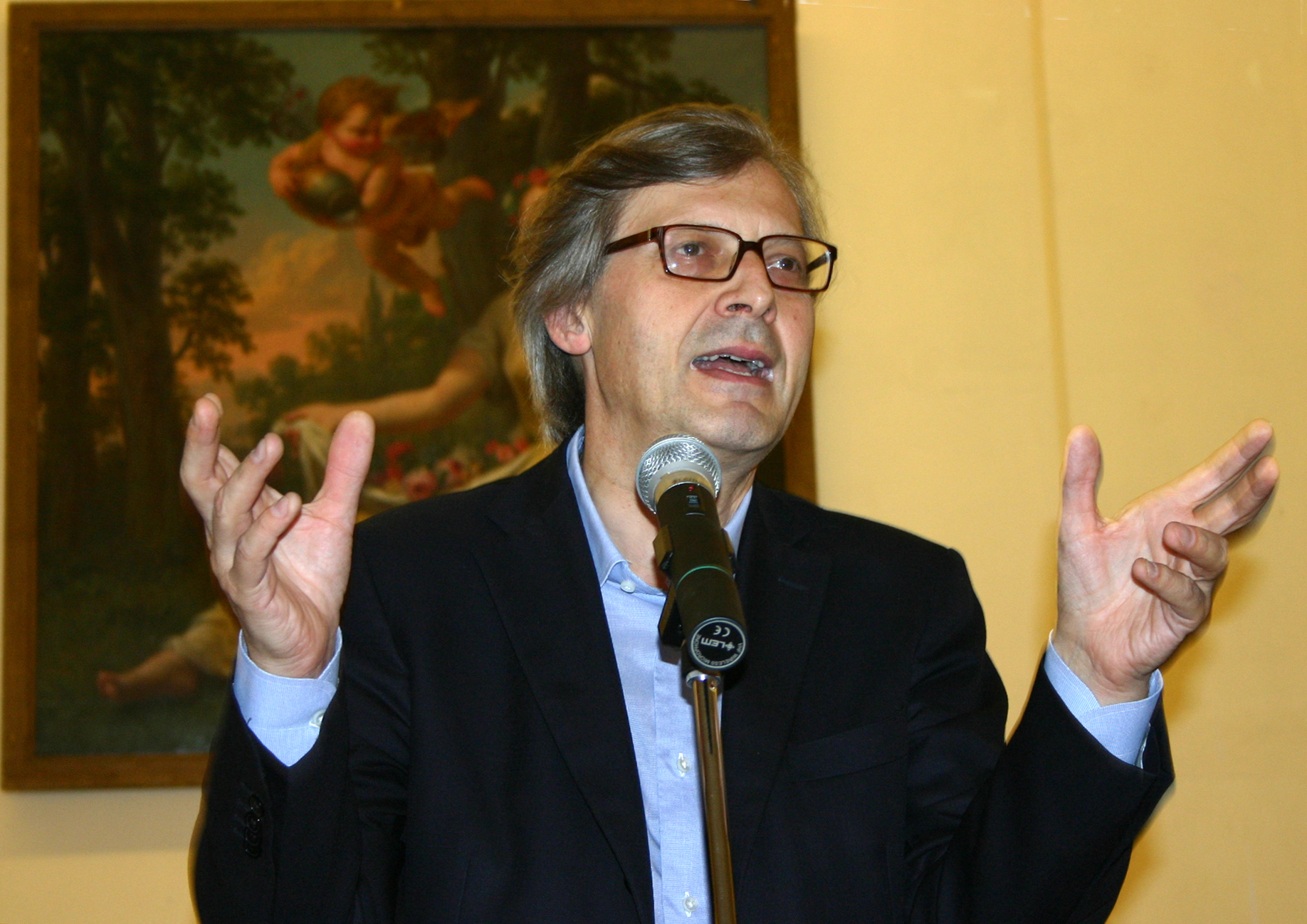
Sgarbi in 2007

Although Sgarbi has strongly defended the role of Catholicism as a foundational element of Italian culture, his relations with faith and religion are complicated. Sgarbi often declared himself Catholic. During a Confronti broadcast, Sgarbi said that he was "proud to be Catholic". In other occasions, he defined himself as atheist. On ethical issues — for example abortion, or euthanasia in the case of Eluana Englaro, whose life was artificially prolonged by 17 years in a vegetative coma, but not in the suicide of Noa Pothoven, calling suicide "a supreme act of life", he sided with the Catholic Church. He declared his opposition not only to gay marriage but to marriage in general, and is in favour of drug legalization. He also attacked the Union of Rationalist Atheists and Agnostics, and once said, writing for il Giornale in 2009, that if modern churches are ugly, it is the fault of atheists.

In February 2019, Sgarbi declared that he believed in the existence of God and that the definitive proof is its art and all the benevolent manifestations of man. He said: "Believing is a form of presumption, at most one can believe one believes. Reason would give no reason: God is unprovable, therefore he does not exist. Demonstration that God exists is only one. ... Art. There is divinity in man because the artist, adding beauty to the world, continues creation. Through art, man immortalizes himself. Dante would say that 'he becomes eternal'." Asked about what is in the afterlife, he replied: "Nothing. No soul remains of Leonardo; there remains the Virgin of the Rocks." In September 2019, Sgarbi stated that he considers himself a cultural Catholic, seeing Christianity more as a philosophy of man than a religion, according to which the idea of God is nothing more than a principle of perfection that pushes men to pursue goals higher.

== Art collections ==
Sgarbi dedicates himself to the collection of ancient books. He has a library with 280,000 volumes, including some ancient and rare ones, such as all the first editions of Giorgio Vasari's writings. He also collected paintings and sculptures with the collaboration of his family members, including his mother Rina Cavallini. The Cavallini–Sgarbi Collection consists of over 500 works; many are paintings, sculptures, and predominantly ancient artefacts of various types. About Silvio Berlusconi's art collection, Sgarbi doubted of its quality and commented that Berlusconi favoured quantity over quality.

Since the early 2020s, Sgarbi has been accused of illicit export of works and laundering stolen goods, in particular a 17th-century Baroque artwork that disappeared from a castle in 2013. This latest investigation, which began in 2024, attracted significant international attention, with many observers pointing to the silence of the prime minister Giorgia Meloni. Sgarbi, who denied the allegations, resigned as undersecretary for culture in February 2024, citing an anti-trust investigation, after he was paid for public events, including books presentations and conferences, despite being a member of Parliament.

== Personal life ==
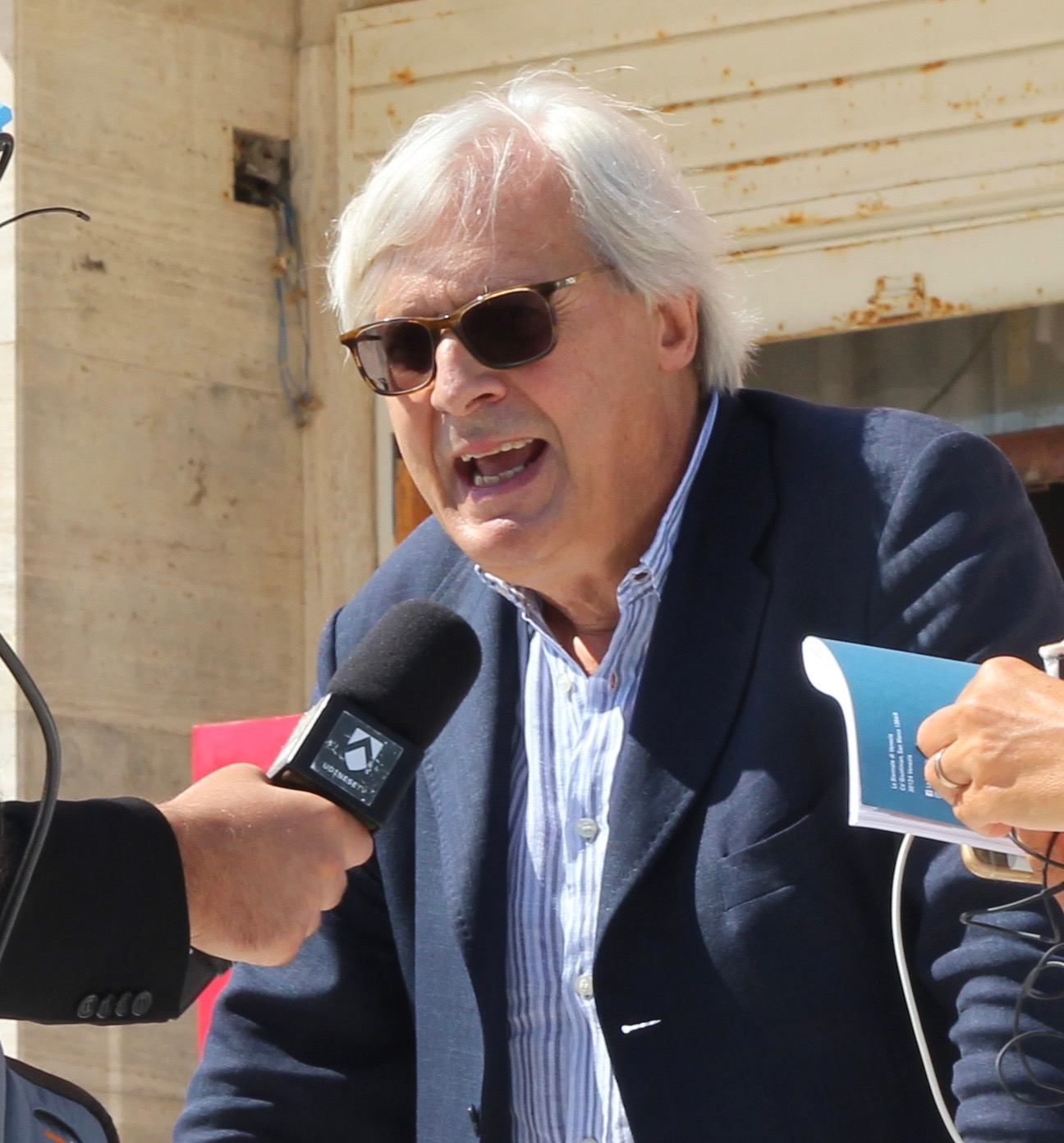
Sgarbi at the 2020 Venice Festival

Sgarbi never married. He has two recognized daughters (born in 1998 and 2000, respectively) and a son (born in 1988). In 2008, Sgarbi commented: "I am against [conventional] paternity. The category of 'father' is not one to which I feel that I must belong. That said, I am also against abortion. There are women who wanted children with me, but I do not, because there can be no obligation to act as a father." In 2011, Ancona's Court of Appeal attributed to him the paternity of a third daughter, then thirteen years old, by an opera singer. On that occasion, he claimed to have had at least forty children.

In 2019, Sgarbi retired from work due to age limits. He taught for three years as a contract professor at the University of Udine. In 2022, he was appointed due to clear fame as full professor of History of Modern Art at the Faculty of Engineering and Architecture of the Kore University of Enna; he never served the position due to the age limits.

In January 2021, Sgarbi revealed that he had asymptomatic COVID-19 and that he had testicular cancer, from which he healed in June 2021. He again tested positive for COVID-19 in February 2022. In March 2025, Sgarbi revealed that he has depression.

Sgarbi has been involved in several criminal and civil trials, and was mainly sentenced to fines for the crimes of defamation and insult. In 1996, he was convicted for the crime of forgery and aggravated and continuous fraud against the state due to the production of false documents and absenteeism in the 1989–1990 period while he was an employee of the Ministry of Cultural Heritage, with the qualification of artistic and cultural heritage official of Veneto, and at the time of his participation in the Maurizio Costanzo Show. He received a suspended prison sentence of 6 months and 10 days. Also sentenced to pay 700,000 lire in compensation, Sgarbi justified himself by stating that his absence from the office depended on his commitment to drafting an art catalogue, and spoke of "arbitrary, discretion, and madness" regarding the sentence. In 2016, a sentence of the labour section of the Court of Venice readmitted Sgarbi to service in the roles of the Superintendence of Venice.

Sgarbi is a commentator of association football events. In May 2017, he made several comments about football figures, such as Antonio Conte, Luciano Moggi, and Diego Armando Maradona; he compared Maradona to Caravaggio, and later stated, upon Maradona's death in November 2020, that he was his friend and always defended him from criticism. In July 2019, Sgarbi had a diatribe with journalist Giampiero Mughini. Referencing both cinema and football, he compared Mughini to the priest in The Exorcist, and joked that Mughini had rekindled his interista soul. In November 2022, Sgarbi described the possible demolition of San Siro as "a crime". In January 2023, he criticized the 15-point penalty issued to Juventus for capital gains.

== Electoral history ==
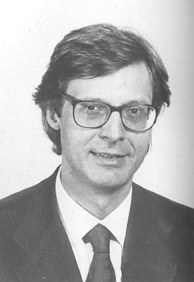
Sgarbi in 1992

Election	House	Constituency	Party	Votes	Result
1992	Chamber of Deputies	Cagliari	PLI	11,438	Elected
1994	Chamber of Deputies	Osimo	FI	21,112	Not elected
1994	Chamber of Deputies	Calabria	FI	– (Note: Elected in a closed list proportional representation system.)	Elected
1996	Chamber of Deputies	Sacile	FI	28,665	Not elected
1996	Chamber of Deputies	Calabria	FI	–	Elected
1999	European Parliament	North-East Italy	FI	85,070	Elected
2001	Chamber of Deputies	Trieste–Muggia	FI	36,710	Not elected
2001	Chamber of Deputies	Veneto 1	FI	–	Elected
2004	European Parliament	Southern Italy	Lib	9,300	Not elected
2006	Chamber of Deputies	Calabria	LC	– (Note: Candidate in a closed list proportional representation system.)	Not elected
2009	European Parliament	Italian Islands	LD	22,334	Not elected
2018	Chamber of Deputies	Acerra	RI	30,596	Not elected
2018	Chamber of Deputies	Emilia-Romagna 2	RI	–	Elected
2022	Senate of the Republic	Emilia-Romagna 3	RI	187,206	Not elected

=== First-past-the-post elections ===
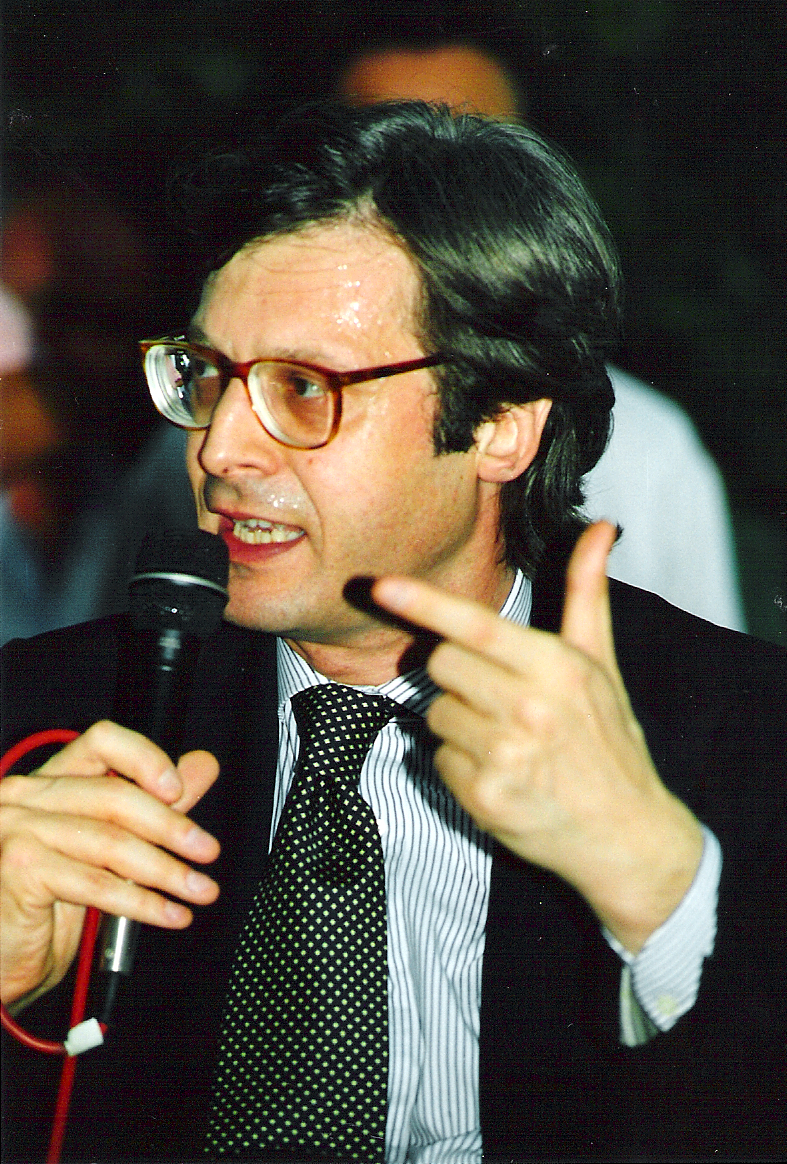
Sgarbi in the 1990s

1994 Italian general election (C): Osimo
Candidate	Coalition	Party	Votes	%
Luigi Giacco	Progressives	PDS	28,427	34.42
Vittorio Sgarbi	–	FI	21,112	25.56
Emanuela Branchesi	Pact for Italy	PS	29,860	24.05
Leonardo Fabrizi	–	AN	13,189	15.97
Total			82,588	100.0
Turnout			90,187	86.73

1996 Italian general election (C): Sacile
Candidate	Coalition	Party	Votes	%
Edouard Ballaman	–	LN	35,028	42.52
Vittorio Sgarbi	–	FI	28,655	34.79
Pio De Angelis	Progressives	PRC	18,690	22.69
Total			82,373	100.0
Turnout			88,486	80.93

2001 Italian general election (C): Trieste–Muggia
Candidate	Coalition	Party	Votes	%
Riccardo Illy	The Olive Tree	Ind	44,495	50.79
Vittorio Sgarbi	House of Freedoms	FI	36,710	41.90
Franco Francescato	–	IdV	2,307	2.63
Marco Gentili	–	LB	2,153	2.46
Others			1,944	2.22
Total			87,609	100.0
Turnout			91,279	80.61

2018 Italian general election (C): Acerra
Candidate	Coalition	Party	Votes	%
Luigi Di Maio	–	M5S	95,219	63.19
Vittorio Sgarbi	Centre-right	RI	30,596	20.38
Antonio Falcone	Centre-left	PD	18,018	12.00
Others			6,315	4.20
Total			150,148	100.0
Turnout			153,528	69.89

2022 Italian general election (S): Bologna
Candidate	Coalition	Party	Votes	%
Pier Ferdinando Casini	Centre-left	CpE	232,069	40.06
Vittorio Sgarbi	Centre-right	RI	187,217	32.32
Fabio Selleri	–	M5S	62,908	10.86
Others			97,868	16.80
Total			579,252	100.0
Turnout			601,061	73.91

== Works ==
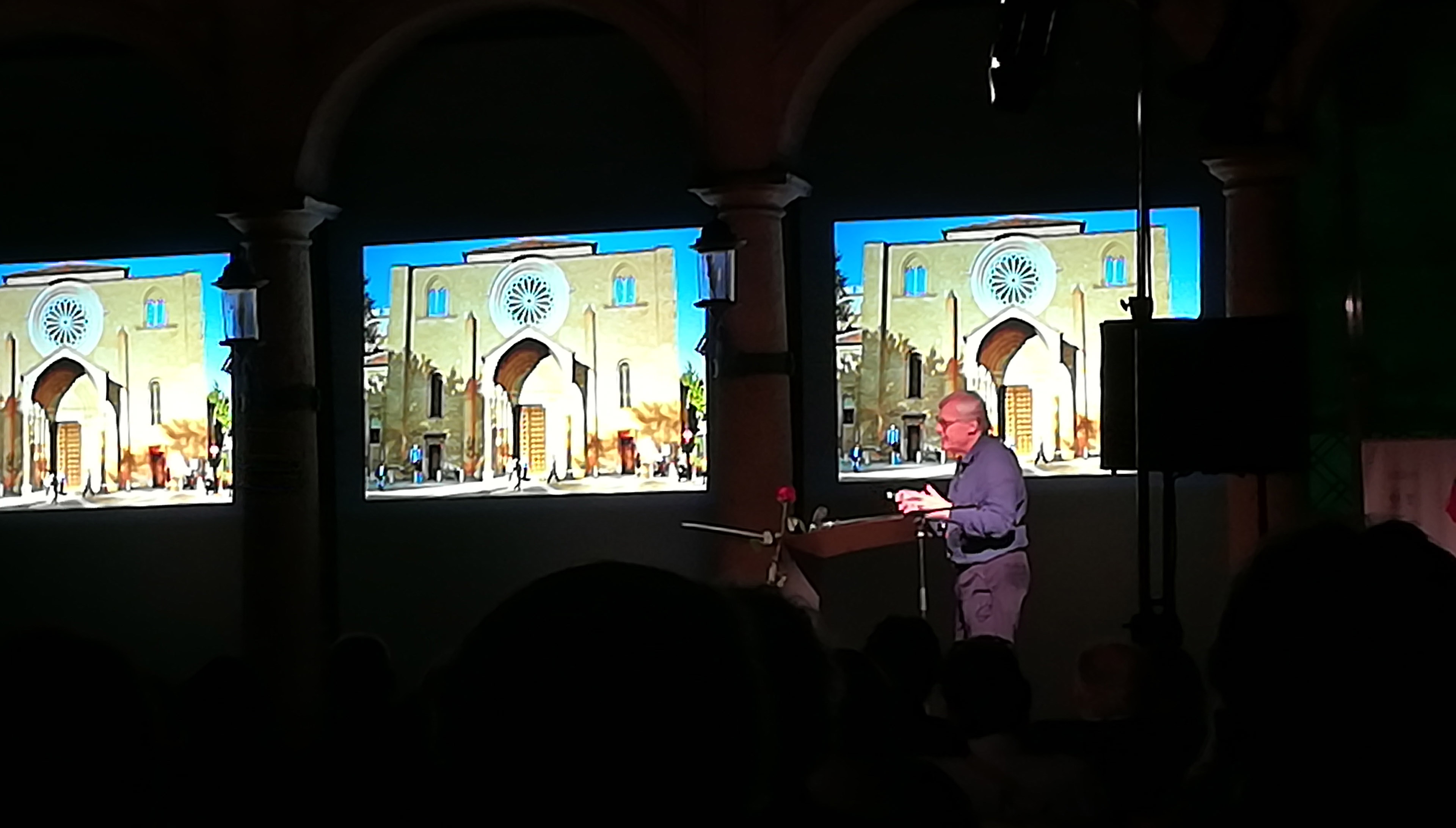
Sgarbi during a lecture in July 2020

Sgarbi is the author of numerous catalogues, monographs, and books on criticism and art history, including among the latest Viaggio sentimentale nell'Italia dei desideri (2010), Piene di grazia. I volti della donna nell'arte (2011), L'arte è contemporanea, ovvero l'arte di vedere l'arte (2012), Nel nome del figlio. Natività, fughe, passioni nell'arte (2012), Il tesoro d'Italia (2013), Il punto di vista del cavallo. Caravaggio (2014), Il tesoro d'Italia. Gli anni delle meraviglie (2014), Dal cielo alla terra. Da Michelangelo a Caravaggio. Il tesoro d'Italia III (2015), Parmigianino. Tra classicismo e manierismo (2016), La Costituzione e la bellezza (2016, with Michele Ainis), Dall'ombra alla luce. Da Caravaggio a Tiepolo. Il tesoro d'Italia IV (2016), Rinascimento (2017, with Giulio Tremonti), Dal mito alla favola bella. Da Canaletto a Boldini. Il tesoro d'Italia V (2017), Il Novecento. I. Dal futurismo al neorealismo. Il tesoro d'Italia VI (2018), Il Novecento. II. Da Lucio Fontana a Piero Guccione. Il tesoro d'Italia VII (2019), Ecce Caravaggio. Da Roberto Longhi a oggi e Raffaello. Un Dio mortale (2021), Canova e la bella amata e Roma. Dal Rinascimento ai giorni nostri (2022), and Scoperte e rivelazioni. Caccia al tesoro dell'arte (2023).

=== List of publications ===
- Il populismo nella letteratura italiana del Novecento, Messina-Florence, D'Anna, 1977.
- Carpaccio, Bologna, Capitol, 1979; Milan, Fabbri, 1994, ISBN 88-450-5538-8; Milan, Rizzoli libri illustrati, 2002, ISBN 88-7423-006-0. Also published in the United States and France.
- Palladio e la Maniera. I pittori vicentini del Cinquecento e i collaboratori del Palladio, 1530-1630, Milan, Electa, 1980. Sgarbi's catalogue.
- Gnoli, Milan, Ricci, 1983, ISBN 88-216-0030-0.
- Capolavori della pittura antica, Milan, A. Mondadori, 1984.
- Tutti i musei d'Italia, Rozzano, Domus, 1984, ISBN 88-7212-010-1. Edited by Sgarbi.
- Antonio da Crevalcore e la pittura ferrarese del Quattrocento a Bologna, Milan, A. Mondadori, 1985.
- L'opera grafica di Domenico Gnoli, Milan, A. Mondadori, 1985. Edited by Sgarbi.
- Carlo Guarienti, Milan, Fabbri, 1985. Edited by Sgarbi.
- Il sogno della pittura. Come leggere un'opera d'arte, Venice, Marsilio, 1985, ISBN 88-317-4795-9. It won the 1985 Premio Estense.
- Mattioli. Antologia 1939-1986, Modena, Il Bulino, 1987.
- Rovigo. Le chiese. Catalogo dei beni artistici e storici, Venice: Giunta regionale del Veneto-Marsilio, 1988.
- Chaim Soutine, Brescia, L'obliquo, 1988.
- Storia universale dell'arte, Milan, A. Mondadori, 1988, ISBN 88-04-33874-1. Edited by Sgarbi.
- Davanti all'immagine. Artisti, quadri, libri, polemiche, Milan, Rizzoli, 1989, ISBN 88-17-53755-1. It won the 1990 Premio Bancarella.
- Giovanni Segantini. I capolavori, Trento, Reverdito, 1989, ISBN 88-342-4070-7.
- La stanza dipinta. Scritti sull'arte contemporanea, Palermo, Novecento, 1989, ISBN 88-373-0108-1.
- Il pensiero segreto. Viaggi incontri emozioni. Prose di conversazione, Milan, Rizzoli, 1990, ISBN 88-17-84045-9; Milan, Sonzogno, 1994.
- W. Alexander Kossuth, Milan, Mazzotta, 1990, ISBN 88-202-0954-3. Edited by Sgarbi.
- Botero. Dipinti sculture disegni, Milan, A. Mondadori arte, 1991, ISBN 88-242-0099-0. Edited by Sgarbi.
- Dell'Italia. Uomini e luoghi, Milan, Rizzoli, 1991, ISBN 88-17-84119-6. It won the 1991 Premio Fregene.
- Dizionario dei monumenti italiani e dei loro autori. Rome, Dal Rinascimento ai giorni nostri, Milan: Bompiani, 1991, ISBN 88-452-1801-5.
- La mia vita, Milan: Condé Nast, 1991. Supplemented to the 11th issue of Italy's Vanity Fair.
- Arturo Nathan. Illusione e destino, Milan, Fabbri, 1992. Exhibition curated by Sgarbi.
- Lo Sgarbino. Dizionario della lingua italiana. I sinonimi e i contrari, divisione in sillabe, coniugazione dei verbi, Bergamo, Larus, 1993.
- Le mani nei capelli, Milan, A. Mondadori, 1993, ISBN 88-04-37351-2.
- Onorevoli fantasmi. Due anni di polemiche parlamentari, Milan, A. Mondadori, 1994, ISBN 88-04-38165-5.
- Lezioni private, Milan, A. Mondadori, 1995, ISBN 88-04-41172-4.
- Lezioni private 2, Milan, Mondadori, 1996, ISBN 88-04-42519-9.
- Alfredo Protti, Milan, G. Mondadori, 1997, ISBN 88-374-1607-5. Edited by Sgarbi.
- A regola d'arte. Libri, quadri, poesie. Nuove lezioni sul bello, Milan, Mondadori, 1998, ISBN 88-04-45771-6.
- Notte e giorno d'intorno girando..., Milan, Rizzoli, 1998, ISBN 88-17-85887-0.
- Stasys or On Solitude, Krakow, IRSA Publishing House, 1999, in Stasys 50: A Retrospective (Stasys Eidrigevičius exhibition catalogue), ed. by Jozef Grabski ISBN 83-908675-3-2.
- Gli immortali, Milan, Rizzoli, 1999, ISBN 88-17-86147-2.
- La casa dell'anima. Educazione all'arte, Milan, Mondadori, 1999. ISBN 88-04-43345-0. It includes a VHS.
- Giotto e il suo tempo, Milan, Motta, 2000, ISBN 88-7179-278-5. Exhibition ideated and curated by Sgarbi.
- Le tenebre e la rosa. Un'antologia, Milan: Rizzoli, 2000, ISBN 88-17-86529-X.
- Balthus, Florence, Giunti, 2001, ISBN 88-09-02055-3.
- Elogio della medicina di Jacovitti. Breve storia di un capolavoro sconosciuto, Milan, Mazzotta, 2001, ISBN 88-202-1330-3. Edited by Sgarbi.
- Percorsi perversi. Divagazioni sull'arte, Milan, Rizzoli, 2001, ISBN 88-17-86852-3.
- Giorgio De Chirico. Dalla Metafisica alla "Metafisica". Opere 1909-1973, Venice, Marsilio, 2002, ISBN 88-317-8167-7. Edited by Sgarbi.
- Il Bene e il Bello. La fragile condizione umana, Milan, Bompiani, 2002, ISBN 88-452-5329-5.
- Wolfgang Alexander Kossuth, 1982-2002, Milan, Skira, 2002, ISBN 88-8491-221-0. Text by and with Michael Engelhard and Mario De Micheli.
- Da Giotto a Picasso. Discorso sulla pittura, Geneva-Milan, Rizzoli libri illustrati, 2002, ISBN 88-7423-070-2.
- Viaggio sentimentale e pittorico di un emiliano in Romagna, Milan, Rizzoli, 2002.
- Parmigianino, Collana Arte moderna e contemporanea, Milan, Rizzoli, 2003, ISBN 88-7423-114-8. Also published by Rizzoli-Skira (Milan), 2003, ISBN 88-7423-195-4. Re-edited as Parmigianino tra Classicismo e Manierismo, Collana i Delfini, Milan, La nave di Teseo, 2016, ISBN 978-88-934403-9-4.
- Francesco del Cossa, Milan, Rizzoli-Skira, 2003, ISBN 978-88-6130-401-7.
- Dell'arte e della morte. Gli ultimi giorni del Parmigianino. Atto unico, Milan, Skira, 2003, ISBN 88-8491-642-9.
- La ricerca dell'identità. Da Antonello a De Chirico, Milan, Skira, 2003, ISBN 88-8491-782-4. Edited by Sgarbi.
- L'Odéo Cornaro, Turin, Allemandi, 2003, ISBN 88-422-1194-X.
- Francesco Scaramuzza, Turin, Allemandi, 2003, ISBN 88-422-1234-2. Edited by Sgarbi.
- Un paese sfigurato. Viaggio attraverso gli scempi d'Italia, Milan, Rizzoli, 2003, ISBN 88-7423-154-7.
- Guercino. Poesia e sentimento nella pittura del '600, Novara, De Agostini, 2003. Edited by Sgarbi with Denis Mahon and Massimo Pulini.
- Per un partito della bellezza, 90th supplement to the bimonthly ARTE, Brescia, EAE Edizioni d'Arte Europee, 2004.
- Andrea Palladio. La luce della ragione. Esempi di vita in villa tra il XIV e XVIII secolo, Milan, Rizzoli libri illustrati, 2004, ISBN 88-17-00454-5. It includes a DVD.
- Dell'anima, Milan, Bompiani, 2004, ISBN 88-452-1125-8.
- Natura e Maniera tra Tiziano e Caravaggio. Le ceneri violette di Giorgione, Milan, Skira, 2004, ISBN 88-7624-120-5. Edited by Sgarbi.
- Gaspare Landi, Milan, Skira, 2004, ISBN 88-7624-219-8. Edited by Sgarbi.
- San Giuseppe con il bambino di Giovan Battista Piazzetta, Turi, Allemandi, 2004, ISBN 88-422-1291-1. Edited by Sgarbi.
- Un capolavoro di Rubens. L'adorazione dei pastori, Milan, Skira, 2004. Edited by Sgarbi.
- Arte e realtà, in Antonio Nunziante, Opere, I, Giaveno, Metamediale, 2004.
- Visioni sospese, in Catalogo generale delle opere di Antonio Nunziante, volume III, Milan, G. Mondadori, 2004, ISBN 88-374-1832-9. With Paolo Levi.
- Aroldo Bonzagni, Milan, Mazzotta, 2005, ISBN 88-202-1766-X. Edited by Sgarbi, with Antonio Forchino and Elena Bastelli.
- Caravaggio, Milan, Skira, 2005, ISBN 88-7624-606-1.
- I giudizi di Sgarbi. 99 artisti dai cataloghi d'arte moderna e dintorni, Milan, Editoriale Giorgio Mondadori, 2005, ISBN 88-374-1826-4.
- Il ritratto interiore: da Lotto a Pirandello, Milan, Skira, 2005, ISBN 88-7624-326-7. Edited by Sgarbi.
- Monteforte. Paesaggi della memoria, Milan, G. Mondadori, 2005, ISBN 88-374-1822-1. Text by Rossana Bessaglia and Emanuela Mazzotti.
- Ragione e passione. Contro l'indifferenza, Milan, Bompiani, 2005, ISBN 88-452-3497-5.
- Vedere le parole. La scrittura d'arte da Vasari a Longhi, Milan, Tascabili Bompiani, 2005, ISBN 88-452-3402-9.
- Le meraviglie della pittura tra Venezia e Ferrara. Dal Quattrocento al Settecento, Cinisello Balsamo, Silvana Editoriale, 2005, ISBN 88-366-0612-1.
- Clausura a Milano (e non solo). Da suor Letizia a Salemi (e ritorno), Milan, Bompiani, 2008, ISBN 978-88-452-6178-7. With Marta Bravi.
- L'Italia delle meraviglie. Una cartografia del cuore, Milan, Bompiani, 2008, ISBN 978-88-452-6381-1.
- Donne e dee nei musei italiani, Milan, Banca Network Investimenti, 2009.
- Klaus Karl Mehrkens. Opere 1983-2008, Siena, Protagon, 2009, ISBN 978-88-8024-262-8. Edited by Sgarbi.
- Viaggio sentimentale nell'Italia dei desideri, Collana Saggi, Milan, Bompiani, 2010, ISBN 978-88-452-6591-4.
- La visione interiore di Piero Landoni, Varese, Agema Corporation Editore, 2010. Edited by Sgarbi.
- Lo stato dell'arte. Regioni d'Italia. Padiglione Italia, LIV Esposizione internazionale d'arte della Biennale di Venezia, iniziativa speciale per il 150º anniversario dell'unità d'Italia, Milan, Skira, 2011, ISBN 978-88-572-1159-6. Edited by Sgarbi.
- Lo stato dell'arte. Accademie di belle arti. Padiglione Italia, LIV Esposizione internazionale d'arte della Biennale di Venezia, iniziativa speciale per il 150º anniversario dell'unità d'Italia. Milan, Skira, 2011, ISBN 978-88-572-1160-2. Edited by Sgarbi.
- Lo stato dell'arte. Istituti italiani di cultura nel mondo. Padiglione Italia, LIV Esposizione nazionale d'arte della Biennale di Venezia, iniziativa speciale per il 150º anniversario dell'unità d'Italia. Milan, Skira, 2011, ISBN 978-88-572-1179-4. Edited by Sgarbi.
- Le meraviglie di Roma. Dal Rinascimento ai giorni nostri, Collana Dizionari dei monumenti italiani, Milan, Bompiani, 2011, ISBN 978-88-452-6716-1.
- Piene di grazia. I volti della donna nell'arte, Collana Saggi, Milan, Bompiani, 2011, ISBN 978-88-452-6819-9. It won the 2012 Premio Cesare Pavese.
- L'ombra del divino nell'arte contemporanea, Siena, Cantagalli, 2011, ISBN 978-88-8272-755-0.
- L'arte è contemporanea, ovvero L'arte di vedere l'arte (con un dialogo con Gillo Dorfles), Collana PasSaggi, Milan, Bompiani, 2012, ISBN 978-88-452-7042-0.
- Nel nome del Figlio. Natività, fughe e passioni nell'arte, Milan, Bompiani, 2012, ISBN 978-88-452-7146-5.
- Mattia Preti, Soveria Mannelli, Rubbettino, 2013, ISBN 978-88-498-3578-6.
- Il punto di vista del cavallo. Caravaggio, Collana PasSaggi, Milan, Bompiani, 2014, ISBN 978-88-452-7332-2. Re-published in Collana I fari, Milan, La nave di Teseo, 2021, ISBN 978-88-346-0450-2.
- La Costituzione e la Bellezza, Collana i Fari (2), Milan, La nave di Teseo, 2016, ISBN 978-88-9344-028-8. With Michele Ainis.
- Rinascimento: con la cultura (non) si mangia, Collana Le boe, Milan, Baldini & Castoldi, 2017, ISBN 978-88-9388-057-2 . With Giulio Tremonti.
- Diario della capra 2019/20, Milan, Baldini+Castoldi, 2019, ISBN 978-88-938-8210-1. 16 goats were drawn by Staino.
- Leonardo. Il genio dell'imperfezione, Collana I fari, Milan, La nave di Teseo, 2019, ISBN 978-88-346-0048-1.
- Il bene e il male. Dio, Arte, Scienza, Milan, La nave di Teseo, 2020, ISBN 978-88-939-5028-2. With Giulio Giorello.
- Ecce Caravaggio. Da Roberto Longhi a oggi, Collana I fari, Milan, La nave di Teseo, 2021, ISBN 978-88-346-0817-3.
- Il Rinascimento in Valle Camonica, Milan, La nave di Teseo, 2021, ISBN 979-12-80043-24-5. Edited by Sgarbi, with preface by his sister Elisabetta Sgarbi.
- Raffaello. Un Dio mortale, Collana I fari, Milan, La nave di Teseo, 2021, ISBN 978-88-346-0366-6.
- Canova e la bella amata, Milan, La nave di Teseo, 2022, ISBN 979-12-80043-38-2.
- Roma. Dal Rinascimento ai giorni nostri, Milan, La nave di Teseo, 2022, ISBN 978-88-346-0598-1.
- Roma. Dal Rinascimento ai giorni nostri. Dizionario dei monumenti e dei loro autori. Fotografie di Andrea Jemolo, updated edition, Milan, La nave di Teseo, 2022, ISBN 978-88-346-0598-1.
- Scoperte e rivelazioni. Milan, La nave di Teseo, 2023, ISBN 978-88-346-1445-7.

=== Il Tesoro d'Italia series ===
- La lunga avventura dell'arte, volume I, Collana Saggistica, Milan, Bompiani, 2013, ISBN 978-88-452-7456-5. Introduction by Michele Ainis.
- Gli anni delle meraviglie. Da Piero Della Francesca a Pontormo', volume II, Collana Saggistica, Milan, Bompiani, 2014, ISBN 978-88-452-7747-4.
- Dal cielo alla terra. Da Michelangelo a Caravaggio, volume III, Collana Saggistica, Milan, Bompiani, 2015, ISBN 978-88-452-8011-5. Introduction by Luca Doninenlli.
- Dall'ombra alla luce. Da Caravaggio a Tiepolo, volume IV, Collana I fari, Milan, La nave di Teseo, 2016, ISBN 978-88-9344-064-6. Introduction by Paolo Di Paolo.
- Dal mito alla favola bella. Da Canova a Boldini, volume V, Collana I fari, Milan, La nave di Teseo, 2017, ISBN 978-88-9344-292-3. Preface by Arturo Carlo Quintavalle.
- Il Novecento. Volume I. Dal Futurismo al Neorealismo, volume VI, tome I, Collana I fari, Milan, La nave di Teseo, 2018, ISBN 978-88-9344-647-1. Introduction by Franco Coredlli.
- Il Novecento. Volume II. Da Lucio Fontana a Piero Guccioni, volume VI, tome II, Collana I fari (46), Milan, La nave di Teseo, 2019, ISBN 978-88-9344-822-2. Preface by Angelo Guglielmi and Italo Zannier.

== Television ==
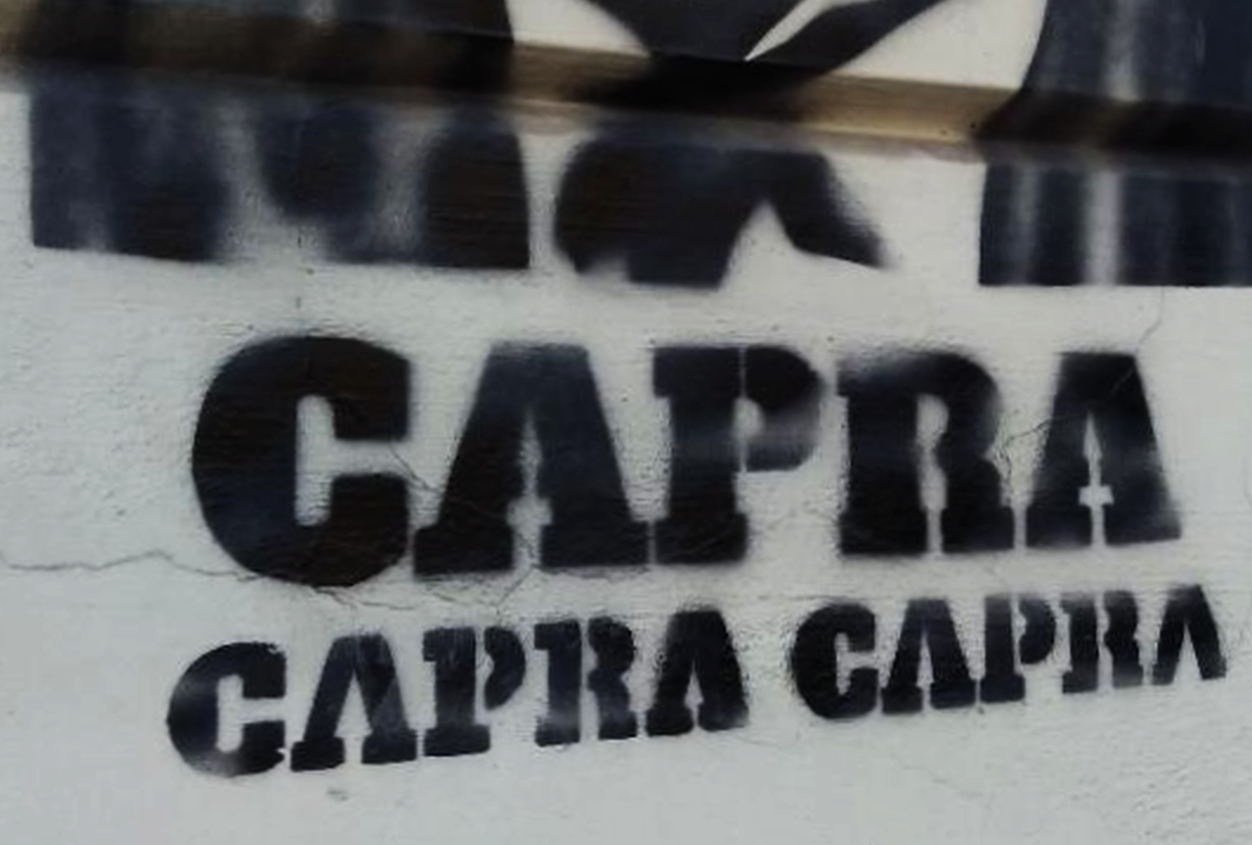
Stencil in Turin referencing Sgarbi's response to Aldo Busi during a television debate

As an opinionist, Sgarbi took part in various television programs, including those of Maurizio Costanzo (Maurizio Costanzo Show) and Mike Bongiorno (Telemike). As a presenter, he hosted Sgarbi quotidiani (1992–1999) and Ci tocca anche Vittorio Sgarbi – Or vi sbigottirà (2011). In 2000, Sgarbi quotidiani was awarded the Premio Internazionale Flaiano per la Televisione.

=== TV shows ===
- Sgarbi quotidiani (Canale 5, 1992–1999)
- Dalla vostra parte (Rete 4, 2018)
- Cartabianca, (Rai 3, 2018)

=== Cinema ===
- Paparazzi (1998), directed by Neri Parenti (cameo)
- Burning Love (2015), directed by Alberto Caviglia (cameo)
- The Blue Kiss (2015), directed by Pino Tordiglione (cameo)

== See also ==
- Antonio Scurati
- Generoso Pompa
- Giuseppe Biagi (painter)
- Lea Vergine
