= The Blue Kiss =

- Il bacio azzurro
- Directed by: Pino Tordiglione
- Screenplay by: Alberto Rondalli; Fortunato Campanile; Pino Tordiglione
- Produced by: House: Invidea network s.r.l.
- Starring: Remo Girone; Lorenzo D'Agata; Sebastiano Somma; Morgana Forcella; Claudio Lippi; Nicola Pignataro
- Cinematography: Claudio Collepiccolo
- Edited by: Daniel McLarry
- Music by: Giovanni Lodigiani
- Distributed by: Pittimovie Italy SRLs
- Release date: 20 April 2015 (Bologna)
- Country: Italy

The Blue Kiss (Italian: Il bacio azzurro) is a 2015 Italian film directed by Pino Tordiglione.

Shot entirely in Irpinia and the Sannio, the title was inspired by a famous poem by Federico García Lorca, The rain:

The rain has a secret vague of enderness drowsiness, resigned and lovable. A humble music wakes up with her and shakes the soul of the sleeping landscape.

It is a blue kiss receiving Earth, the primitive myth that is renewed. The cold touch of old heaven and earth, with a peace of long evenings..."

— Federico García Lorca, The rain

The shooting took place from May to July 2013. On March 23, 2015 it premiered at the National Film Archive of Bologna. It debuted in Italian theaters on April 20, 2015.

The musical theme The Blue Kiss is an original song composed and directed by Giovanni Lodigiani. With text and voice of Amii Stewart.

== The idea ==
In 2013, Edoardo Di Gennaro expressed an idea to celebrate the 75th anniversary of the Alto Calore – the Bureau of Irpinia for the management and control of water – of which he is the general manager. The proposal was intended to emphasize the fundamental importance of the Alto Calore economic management of the most important wealth of the province, highlighting the appearance of a large family in which each employee has his or her own very specific task. Di Gennaro also wanted to send an important educational message about the conscious use of water as the most essential substance for life, especially in an age when the need for equitable distribution is most pressing. According to Di Gennaro, water is the element of peace and unity among peoples, a wealth to be safeguarded and respected and a unique key resource that can ensure the survival of the planet in its delicate balance. The project attracted the immediate attention of international organizations, first of all the United Nations, who said it was of "high educational value" and UNESCO. The Italian Ministry for Environment and the Italian Ministry of Education have entered it in the next school programs of environmental education.

== The setting ==
Irpinia is but a territory of small and very small villages. It's the green lung of Campania. An immense green ocean that has in its belly, one of the biggest watersheds in the world, capable of 15,000 cubic meters / sec. and is so full of water that it can be generously shared not only in the province of Avellino, but also to those around, including the provinces of Naples and Benevento and in regions such as Basilicata, Apulia, and Molise.

== The plot ==
Francesco is a child like all children, lively and curious, but lives a difficult family situation. His academic achievements are clouded by the separation of his parents, Julia and her husband, engineer Ciretti, the officer in charge of the aqueduct. His dream is to see them together again and his grandfather, Angelo, tries to help. For a school assignment, during the holidays he embarks with him on a long journey to the discovery of a fantastic world, never considered before—the magical world of water. Through the stories of his grandfather and long walks with him, Francesco learned that water is not only the liquid that we use to quench our thirst and to wash, automatically and with indifference, without asking where it comes from. He also learns that it is a precious treasure to be respected and to be protected, because it is a universal asset. At the end of the journey, not only he has learned an important lesson, but "someone", quietly and unobtrusively, realized his desire.

== Participations ==
Vittorio Sgarbi	Italy
Angaangaq	Greenland
Sobonfu E. Somè	Burkina Faso
Masaru Emoto	Japan
Maka'Ala Yales	Hawaiian Islands (Hawaii)
Bob Randall	Australia
Lynne McTaggart	United Kingdom

== Acknowledgements ==
- Patronage ONU UN Water for Life 2014 Water Decade 2015
- Sponsored by UNESCO
- Special mention AIFF out of competition in 2014
- Special prize out of competition in OFFICINEMA 2014
- Selected at the Capri Hollywood Film Festival 2014
- Selected at the Los Angeles Italian Film Art Festival 2015
- Special mention to the promo Filmspray 2015 Florence
- Patronage MiUR
- Sponsored by the Ministry for the Environment
- Lagunamovie Prize, Grade 2015
- 72nd Venice International Film Festival: Special Prize Green Drop Award 2015
- International Exhibition of Milan - Special Award X Table National River Contracts in 2015
- First Prize for Best Film - 2nd Edition Meta Film Festival 2015
- Prize City of Saviano 2016
