= Quartiere (film) =

- Directed by: Silvano Agosti
- Written by: Silvano Agosti
- Cinematography: Silvano Agosti
- Edited by: Silvano Agosti
- Music by: Ennio Morricone
- Release date: 1987
- Language: Italian

Quartiere (also known as Neighborhood) is a 1987 Italian drama film written and directed by Silvano Agosti.

The film was entered into the main competition at the 44th edition of the Venice Film Festival.

== Cast ==
- Victoria Zinny as the mother
- Dario Ghirardi as the father
- Valeria Sabel as the aunt
- Lino Salemme as Giulio
- Alessandra Corsale as the sister
- Paola Agosti as the other mother
- Sergio Bini as Nino
