= Détective =

1985 film

- Film poster
- Directed by: Jean-Luc Godard
- Written by: Alain Sarde; Philippe Setbon; Jean-Luc Godard
- Produced by: Christine Gozlan; Alain Sarde
- Starring: Claude Brasseur; Nathalie Baye; Johnny Hallyday
- Cinematography: Louis Bihi
- Edited by: Marilyne Dubreuil
- Release date: 10 May 1985
- Running time: 95 minutes
- Country: France
- Language: French

Détective is a 1985 French crime film directed by Jean-Luc Godard. It was entered into the 1985 Cannes Film Festival. The film won the Georges Delerue Award for Best Soundtrack/Sound Design at Film Fest Gent in 1985.

== Plot ==
In a room of a grand Paris hotel, two detectives are keeping watch. One is William, who used to be the hotel detective until he was fired after an unexplained death in that room. The other is his nephew Isidore, accompanied by his girlfriend Arielle. In a second room is Jim, a boxing promoter, accompanied by his boxer Tiger with his girlfriend Princesse. Jim is counting on a big win for Tiger, in order to repay his debt to a couple in a third room. These are Émile, a pilot whose business charters are losing money, and his wife Françoise. Émile is in urgent need of cash to avoid collapse and to give his wife a divorce. A fourth room has, with his entourage, an old mafioso who has turned up to collect old debts, including some from Jim.

While Émile is busy flying, Françoise starts an affair with Jim, who gives her money for new clothes, and the two agree to pair up if both get the payoff they are expecting. The upcoming fight melts away when Tiger disappears with Princesse, leaving Jim just her jewels. Émile, when Françoise says she will leave him for Jim, shoots Jim dead. Attempting to retaliate, Isidore accidentally shoots William dead. Émile takes the old mafioso's granddaughter hostage and is shot dead by the "family".

== Cast ==
- Claude Brasseur as Émile Chenal
- Nathalie Baye as Françoise Chenal
- Johnny Hallyday as Jim Fox Warner
- Laurent Terzieff as William Prospero
- Jean-Pierre Léaud as Isidore
- Alain Cuny as Old Mafioso
- Emmanuelle Seigner as Princesse
- Julie Delpy as Young Girl
- Aurelle Doazan as Arielle
- Stéphane Ferrara as Tiger Jones

== Production ==
About her nude scenes in this movie, Emmanuelle Seigner recalled that, "The first day Godard asked me to take off my bra, the second the panties. So I protested: 'Who did you take me for?' Finally Godard said: 'Keep your panties'. I was 17, I had no desire to appear naked in a movie."

== Reception ==
On review aggregator website Rotten Tomatoes, the film holds an approval rating of 92% based on 12 reviews, with an average rating of 7.6/10.

== See also ==
- Jean-Luc Godard filmography
