= La seconda ombra =

- Directed by: Silvano Agosti
- Written by: Silvano Agosti
- Produced by: Silvano Agosti
- Starring: Remo Girone as Franco Basaglia; Victoria Zinny as Franca Ongaro
- Release date: 2000
- Running time: 95 minutes
- Country: Italy
- Language: Italian

La seconda ombra (English: The second shadow) is an Italian film directed by Silvano Agosti in 2000.

Most of the cast were people who had actually worked or lived in psychiatric hospitals in Gorizia and Trieste.

== Plot ==
The film deals with developments related to the activities of Franco Basaglia, director of the psychiatric hospital in Gorizia and promoter of Law 180.
