= The Liberals Sgarbi =

The Liberals Sgarbi I Liberal Sgarbi
- Leader: Vittorio Sgarbi
- Founded: 21 March 1999
- Dissolved: c. 2007
- Ideology: Liberalism; Libertarianism
- Political position: Centre-right
- National affiliation: House of Freedoms (2000–06)
- European Parliament group: EPP-ED (1999–2001)
- Colours: Yellow, Blue

The Liberals Sgarbi (Italian: I Liberal Sgarbi), then renamed Liberals Sgarbi – The Libertarians (Italian: Liberal Sgarbi – I Libertari), was a minor personalist-liberal political party in Italy.

The party was founded in March 1999 by Vittorio Sgarbi, a member of the Chamber of Deputies first elected in 1992 with the Italian Liberal Party, who later joined Forza Italia (1994), the Federalist Party (1995) and the Pannella-Sgarbi List (1996). In the 1999 European Parliament election, thanks to a new electoral pact with Forza Italia, Sgarbi was elected to the European Parliament and served there for two years. In 2001 he was re-elected to the Chamber of Deputies for Forza Italia.

In the 2004 European Parliament election the party formed a joint list with the Italian Republican Party, gainining 0.7% of the vote and no MEPs. In the 2006 general election, it sided with the centre-left The Union and was part of the Consumers' List, along with the Southern Democratic Party, but Sgarbi failed to be re-elected. In the same year's municipal election of Milan the party supported Letizia Moratti, who was elected mayor for the House of Freedoms coalition.
