= Valeria Sabel =

Italian actress (1928-2009)

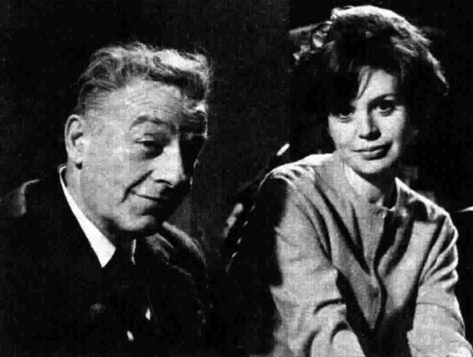
- Franco Scandurra and Valeria Sabel, 1967.
- Born: 7 April 1928; Filandari, Italy
- Died: 18 August 2009 (aged 81); Rome, Italy
- Occupation: Actress
- Years active: 1964–2009

Valeria Sabel (7 April 1928 – 18 August 2009) was an Italian actress. She appeared in more than sixty films from 1964 to her death. In Godfather III she played the role of Sister Vincenza.

== Selected filmography ==
Year	Title	Role	Notes
1966	Navajo Joe	Hannah Lynne	
1969	Zum zum zum - La canzone che mi passa per la testa	Mother of Ferruccio Vincenzi	
1969	Il ragazzo che sorride		
1969	Sai cosa faceva Stalin alle donne?	Aldo's lover	
1969	Zum zum zum n° 2	Stefania	
1969	Brief Season		
1970	W le donne	Simonetta's Mother	
1971	Quante volte... quella notte	Mrs. Sofia Brandt	
1972	Baron Blood	Martha Hummel	
1973	We Want the Colonels	Rina - Di Cori's wife	Uncredited
1973	The Violent Professionals	Wife	
1973	Amore e ginnastica		
1974	Anno uno	Francesca De Gasperi	
1974	E cominciò il viaggio nella vertigine	Zinaida	
1976	Morel's Invention	Zinaida	
1976	Hanno ucciso un altro bandito		
1977	I Am Afraid	Judge Massimi's Wife	Uncredited
1977	A Spiral of Mist	Cecilia	
1979	Improvviso		
1985	Amici miei – Atto III	Anna Migliari	
1987	Quartiere	The Aunt	
1987	They Call Me Renegade	Rachel	
1988	Re di Macchia		
1988	I ragazzi di via Panisperna	Annunciatrice EIAR	
1990	The Godfather Part III	Sister Vincenza	
1992	Damned the Day I Met You	Bernardo's mother	
1993	For Love, Only for Love	Sara	
1996	Follow Your Heart	Elsa Razman	
1996	La bruttina stagionata		
1999	Il guerriero Camillo		
2001	Light of My Eyes	Old Woman	
2003	Do You Mind If I Kiss Mommy?	Cia	
2005	Mario's War	Nonna	
2005	Texas	Italia	
2006	Don't Make Any Plans for Tonight	Medium	
2009	Giulia Doesn't Date at Night	Donna Anziana	
