= A Spiral of Mist =

- Directed by: Eriprando Visconti
- Cinematography: Blasco Giurato
- Edited by: Franco Arcalli
- Music by: Ivan Vandor
- Distributed by: Variety Distribution
- Release date: 8 September 1977
- Countries: France; Italy

A Spiral of Mist (Italian: Una spirale di nebbia, French: Caresses bourgeoises, also known as Une spirale de brume) is a 1977 Italian-French thriller-drama film directed by Eriprando Visconti. It is based on the novel with the same name written by Michele Prisco. This film has not seen release in English-speaking countries.

== Plot ==
During a short hunt, Fabrizio (Marc Porel) kills his wife Valeria (Carole Chauvet) with a shotgun. There are no eyewitnesses. Maria Teresa (Claude Jade), Fabrizio's cousin, remains convinced of his innocence. And the only way to suffocate the scandal seems to be to intervene Marcello (Duilio Del Prete), lawyer and husband of Maria Teresa, to put pressure on the judiciary. Judge Renato Marinoni (Stefano Satta Flores) begins her investigation. He finds out, what we see in flashbacks: Valeria tried to couple her friend Maria Teresa with the beautiful and sexually active lawyer Cesare Molteni (Roberto Posse). But Maria Teresa declined to sleep together in the house of Fabrizio at the last moment. Both marriages, by Maria Teresa and by her cousin Fabrizio, were unhappy. Today Maria Teresa is in a difficult situation: married to Marcello, forty years old, helpless but helpless despite the therapies, she has just come to know that her husband is getting ready to recognize the child that their driver (Flavio Andreini) has conceived with their housekeeper Armida (Anna Bonaiuto). For the first time, in front of the family council (Corrado Gaipa, Marina Berti) in the center of which she has always been refuge, Maria Teresa replies firmly. The woman, who, for fear of being silent, married the lawyer, decides to act on her own, according to her own will.

== Cast ==
- Marc Porel: Fabrizio
- Claude Jade: Maria Teresa
- Duilio Del Prete: Marcello
- Carole Chauvet: Valeria
- Stefano Satta Flores: Renato Marinoni
- Flavio Bucci: Vittorio
- Martine Brochard: Lavinia
- Eleonora Giorgi: Lidia
- Roberto Posse: Molteni
- Marina Berti: Costanza San Germano
- Corrado Gaipa: Pietro San Germano
- Anna Bonaiuto: Armida
- Elvira Cortese: Cesira
- Valeria Sabel: Cecilia
- Flavio Andreini: Driver
