= Black Sun (2007 film) =

- Directed by: Krzysztof Zanussi
- Written by: Krzysztof Zanussi; Rocco Familiari
- Produced by: Saïd Ben Saïd; Francesco Papa; Igor Uboldi
- Starring: Valeria Golino
- Cinematography: Ennio Guarnieri
- Music by: Wojciech Kilar
- Release date: 2007
- Language: Italian
- Box office: $ 88 786

Black Sun (Italian: Il sole nero) is a 2007 Italian-French revenge drama film written and directed by Krzysztof Zanussi and starring Valeria Golino. It is based on the stage drama Agata by Rocco Familiari.

== Cast ==
- Valeria Golino as Agata
- Kaspar Capparoni as Salvo
- Lorenzo Balducci as Manfredi
- Marco Basile as Pusher
- Toni Bertorelli as Inspector
- Remo Girone as Anatomopathologist
- Rocco Familiari as Priest
- Béatrice Kruger as Psychologist
