= Silvano Agosti =

Italian film director (born 1938)

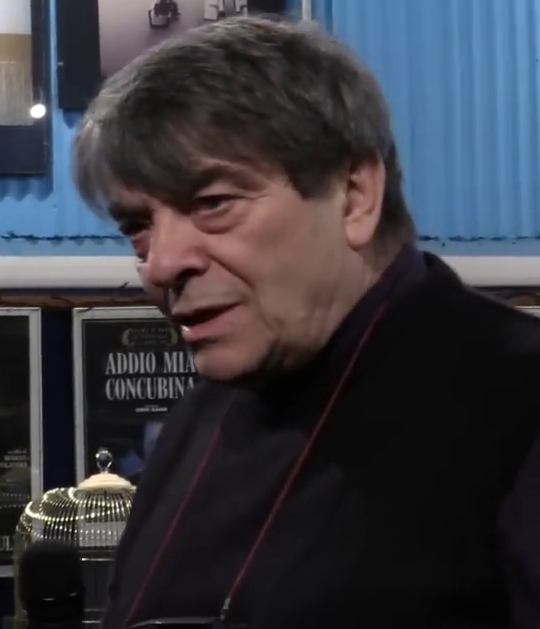
- Agosti in 2013
- Born: 23 March 1938 (age 87); Brescia, Italy
- Occupation: Screenwriter

Silvano Agosti (born 23 March 1938) is an Italian film director, screenwriter, documentarist and film editor.

== Life and career ==
Born in Brescia, Agosti graduated in direction at the Centro Sperimentale di Cinematografia and specialized in editing at the Gerasimov Institute of Cinematography in Moscow. After directing several shorts and serving as film editor in Marco Bellocchio's Fists in the Pocket, he made his feature film debut in 1967 with Garden of Delights, which was heavily cut from censorship. In the following years he mostly focused on socio-political documentaries, dealing with themes such as the protests of 1968, of the resistance against the 'Colonels' regime in Greece, and the strategy of tension.

In the second half of the 1970s, Agosti founded in Rome the cineclub Azzurro Scipioni, which became a reference point for art cinema filmmakers and film buffs. Known by Italians as a small Louvre of cinema. In 1987, his film Quartiere was entered into the main competition at the 44th Venice International Film Festival. In 1992, he won the Ciak d'Oro for best editing for his film Sweet War, Farewell. In 2019, he received the Nastro d'Argento Lifetime Achievement Award for his career.

In addition to his film work, Agosti is also active as a novelist and poet.

== Filmography ==
- Garden of Delights (1967)
- N.P. - Il segreto (1971)
- Matti da slegare (1975, co-directed with Marco Bellocchio, Sandro Petraglia and Stefano Rulli)
- Skärseld (1975, co-directed with Michael Meschke and Orhan Oguz)
- In the Highest of Skies (1977)
- La macchina cinema (1978, co-directed with Marco Bellocchio, Sandro Petraglia and Stefano Rulli)
- D'amore si vive (1983)
- L'addio a Enrico Berlinguer (1984, co-director)
- Quartiere (1987)
- Sweet War, Farewell (1992)
- L'uomo proiettile (1995)
- La seconda ombra (2000)
- La ragion pura (2001)
- Il fascino dell'impossibile (2016)
- Ora e sempre riprendiamoci la vita (2018)
