= Civry-la-Forêt =

- Commune
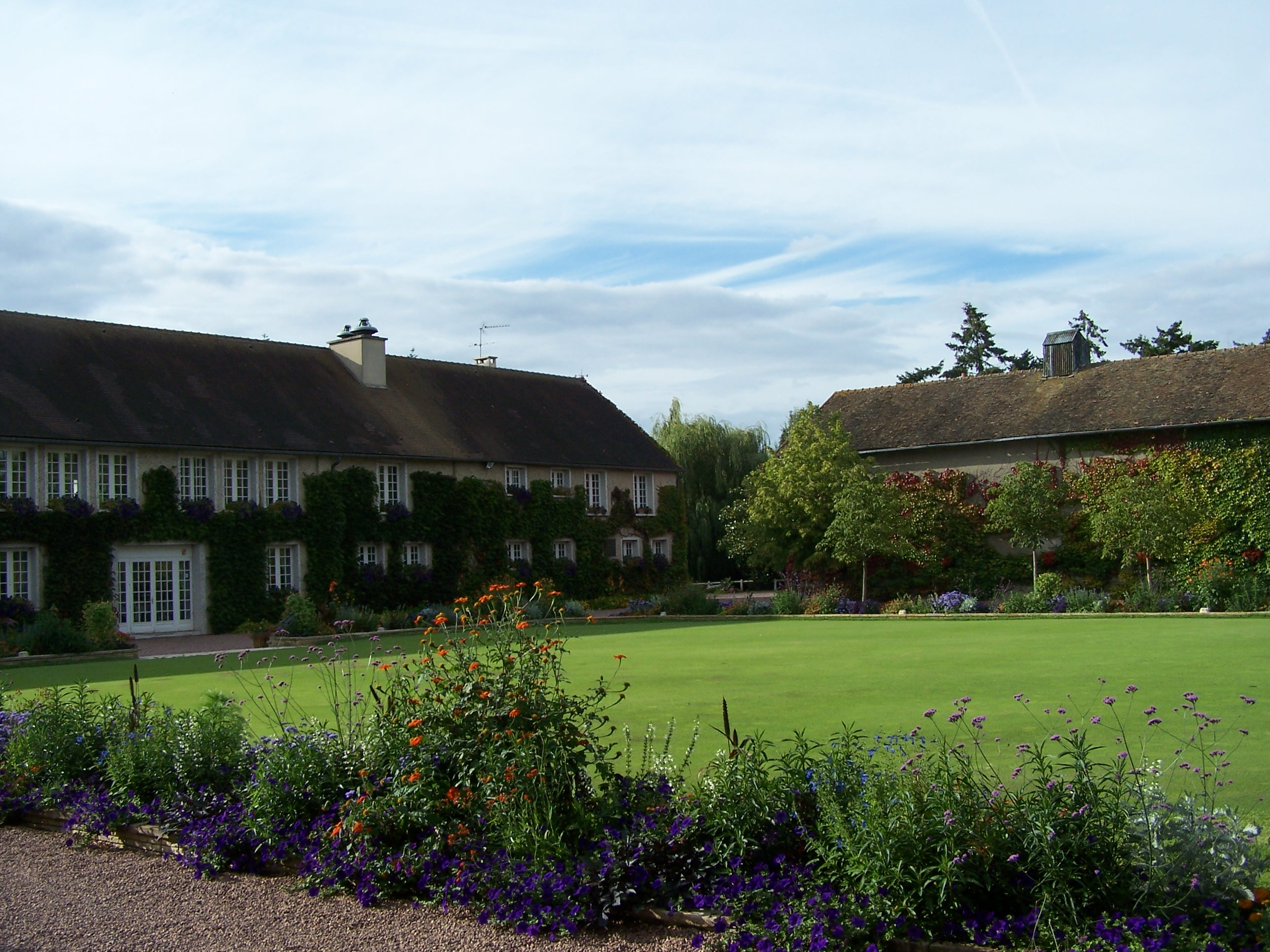
- The golf club in Civry-la-Forêt
- Location of Civry-la-Forêt
- Location within France Location within Île-de-France (region)
- Coordinates: 48°52′03″N 1°37′01″E
- Country: France
- Region: Île-de-France
- Department: Yvelines
- Arrondissement: Mantes-la-Jolie
- Canton: Bonnières-sur-Seine
- Intercommunality: Pays houdanais

Government
  - Mayor (2020–2026): Elie Setiaux
- Area^{1}: 9.40 km^{2} (3.63 sq mi)
- Elevation: 126 m (413 ft)
- Highest elevation: 157 m (515 ft)
- Lowest elevation: 80 m (260 ft)
- Population (2023): 373
  - Density: 39.7/km^{2} (103/sq mi)
- Time zone: UTC+01:00 (CET)
  - Summer (DST): UTC+02:00 (CEST)
- INSEE/Postal code: 78163 /78910
- ^{1} French Land Register data, which excludes lakes, ponds, glaciers > 1 km^{2} (0.386 sq mi or 247 acres) and river estuaries.

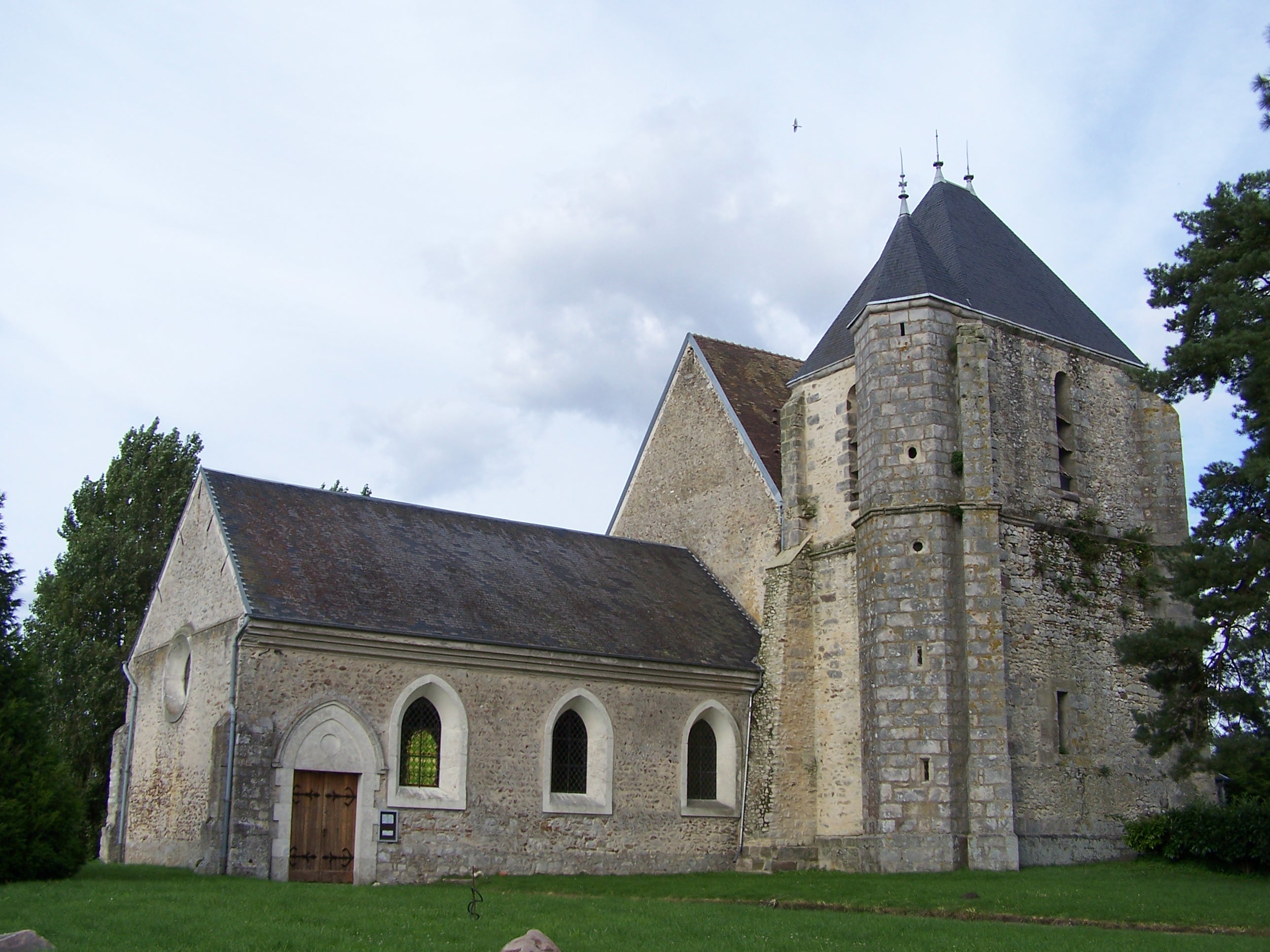
Saint-Barthélemy

Civry-la-Forêt (French pronunciation: [sivʁi la fɔʁɛ]) is a commune in the Yvelines department in the Île-de-France region in north-central France.

== See also ==
- Communes of the Yvelines department
