= Remo Girone =

Italian actor (1948–2025)

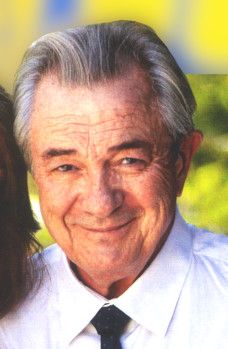
- Girone in 2018
- Born: 1 December 1948; Asmara, British Military Administration in Eritrea
- Died: 3 October 2025 (aged 76); Monte Carlo, Monaco
- Occupation: Actor
- Years active: 1961–2025
- Spouse: Victoria Zinny

Remo Girone (1 December 1948 – 3 October 2025) was an Italian film and stage actor. He is best known for the role of Tano Cariddi in the epic TV series La piovra (The Octopus). He appeared as an Italian-American mob boss in Live by Night and appeared in Ford v Ferrari as Enzo Ferrari. His widow is the actress Victoria Zinny, who is perhaps best known for her role in the film Viridiana.

Girone died on 3 October 2025, at the age of 76.

== Filmography ==
Year	Title	Role	Notes
1974	The Antichrist	Filippo Oderisi	
1977	Il gabbiano	Costantino	
1978	Corleone	Biagio Lo Cascio	
1980	Le chemin perdu	Angelo Grimaldi	
1982	Malamore	Il monco	
1985	L'amara scienza		
1988	Giallo alla regola	Sergio Anselmi	
1990	Café Europa	Rizzo	
1990	Nel giardino delle rose	Giulio	
1990	Breath of Life	Sebastiano	
1990	Captain Fracassa's Journey	Vallombrosa	
1991	Mezzaestate		
1992	Angel with a Gun	Il commissario	
1994	Dietro la pianura	Paolo Brentano	
1995	Vörös Colibri	Abadze	
1995	Pocahontas	Chief Powhatan	Italian dub
1997	Marquise	Jean-Baptiste Lully	
1998	Giochi d'equilibrio	Andrea '97	
1998	Pocahontas II: Journey to a New World	Chief Powhatan	Italian dub
1999	Li chiamarono... briganti!	Don Pietro, il sacerdote	
2000	La seconda ombra	Director	
2000	La Prova	Don Vincenzo	
2002	Heaven	Filippo's Father	
2002	Per finta e per amore		
2003	The Tulse Luper Suitcases		
2004	Roundtrip	Padre di Dante	
2004	L'eretico - Un gesto di coraggio	Dino del Garbo	
2005	Persona Non Grata	Italian Consul	
2006	Quijote	Morte	
2007	The Duchess of Langeais	Le confesseur au couvent	
2007	Il 7 e l'8	Mimmo Barresi	
2007	Black Sun	Anatomopatologo	
2007	Peopling the Palaces at Venaria Reale	Segretario	
2008	Misstake	Giovanni	(credit only)
2009	Italians	Roviglione	(first segment)
2011	The Jewel	Amanzio Rastelli	
2012	Mary of Nazareth	Pontius Pilate	
2013	Roche papier ciseaux	Lorenzo	
2013	Welcome Mr. President	Morelli	
2013	Fondi '91	Paolo	
2014	Maicol Jecson	Cesare	
2015	Shades of Truth		
2015	The Blue Kiss	Nonno Angelo	
2015	Rosso Mille Miglia	Giovanni Nobile	
2016	Infernet	Don Luciano	
2016	La sindrome di Antonio	Gino	
2016	Live by Night	Maso Pescatore	
2017	Mothers	Eric	
2017	Voice from the Stone	Alessio	
2017	La ragazza dei miei sogni	Conte	
2018	Killing Eve	Cesare Greco	Episode: "Nice Face"
2018	Eter	Old Priest	
2019	Don't Stop Me Now	Comandante D'Alessandro	
2019	All You Ever Wished For	Don Rossi	
2019	Ford v Ferrari	Enzo Ferrari	
2022	My Name Is Vendetta	Don Angelo Lo Bianco	
2023	The Equalizer 3	Enzo Arisio	

== Awards ==
- 2019, in July he received the Grand Prix Corallo Città di Alghero for the Cinema – Theater section.
- 2021 – Lifetime Achievement Award, Flaiano Award, Theater section
- 2021 – Lifetime Achievement Award at the 78th Venice International Film Festival
