= Paolo Mereghetti =

Italian film critic (born 1949)

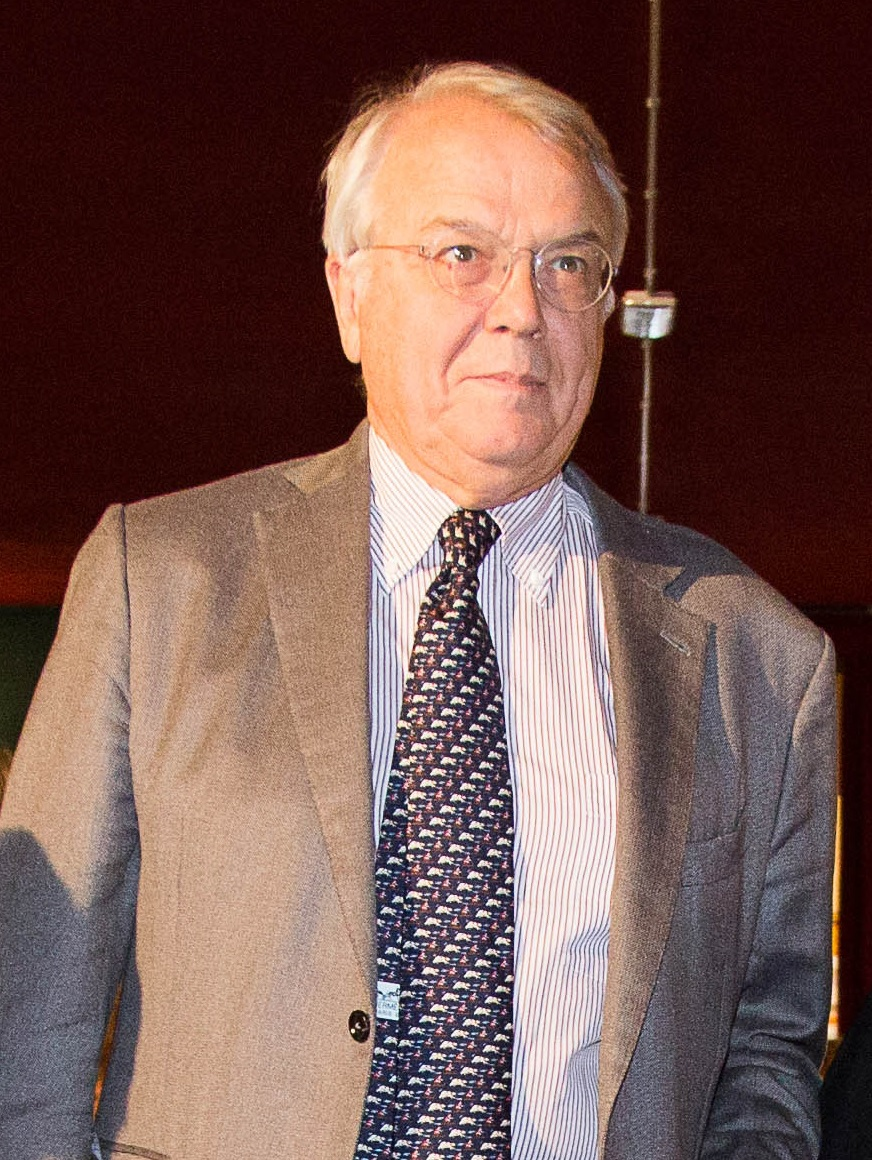
- Born: 28 September 1949 (age 75); Milan, Italy
- Occupation: Film critic

Paolo Mereghetti (born 28 September 1949) is an Italian film critic.

Born in Milan, Mereghetti graduated in philosophy with a thesis about Orson Welles. Currently the film critic of the newspaper Corriere della Sera, he collaborated with various magazines, including Positif, Linus, SegnoCinema, Ombre Rosse.

Mereghetti is best known for the book collection of film reviews Il Mereghetti, he published in various editions starting from 1993. In 2001 he was awarded a Flaiano Prize for film criticism.
