= Enrico Medioli =

Italian screenwriter

- Born: 17 March 1925; Parma, Emilia-Romagna, Italy
- Died: 21 April 2017 (aged 92); Orvieto, Umbria, Italy
- Occupation: Screenwriter
- Years active: 1960–2017

Enrico Medioli (17 March 1925 – 21 April 2017) was an Italian screenwriter.

== Biography ==
Born in Parma, Medioli was one of the most well known screenwriters in Italy. He co-wrote seven films directed by Luchino Visconti (including The Damned for which he received an Oscar nomination for Best Original Screenplay) and worked with directors like Valerio Zurlini, Sergio Leone, Giuliano Montaldo, Mauro Bolognini, Alberto Lattuada, Vittorio Caprioli and Liliana Cavani.

Medioli died in his home in Orvieto at the age of 92.

== Filmography ==
- Rocco and His Brothers (1960)
- Girl with a Suitcase (1961)
- The Leopard (1963)
- Sandra (1965)
- The Damned (1969)
- Listen, Let's Make Love (1969)
- Splendori e miserie di Madame Royale (1970)
- Indian Summer (1972)
- Ludwig (1973)
- Conversation Piece (1974)
- The Innocent (1976)
- The Lady of the Camellias (1981)
- Beyond the Door (1982)
- Petomaniac (1983)
- Once Upon a Time in America (1984)
- The Gold Rimmed Glasses (1987)
