= Ludwig (film) =

- French film poster
- Directed by: Luchino Visconti
- Written by: Luchino Visconti; Enrico Medioli; Suso Cecchi d'Amico
- Produced by: Dieter Geissler; Ugo Santalucia; Robert Gordon Edwards
- Starring: Romy Schneider; Helmut Berger; Silvana Mangano; Trevor Howard; Gert Fröbe; Helmut Griem; John Moulder-Brown
- Cinematography: Armando Nannuzzi
- Edited by: Ruggero Mastroianni
- Music by: Richard Wagner; Robert Schumann; Jacques Offenbach
- Production companies: Mega Film; Cinétel; Divina Film; Dieter Geissler Filmproduktion; RAI
- Distributed by: Panta Cinematografica (Italy); Gloria Filmverleih (Germany); MGM (U.S./U.K.)
- Release dates: 18 January 1973 (West Germany); 7 March 1973 (Italy); 15 March 1973 (France)
- Running time: 238 minutes 177 minutes (U.S. cut)
- Countries: Italy; West Germany; France
- Language: English
- Budget: DM12 million

Ludwig (German: Ludwig II.) is a 1973 epic biographical drama film co-written and directed by Luchino Visconti. The film stars Helmut Berger as King Ludwig II of Bavaria and Romy Schneider as Empress Elisabeth of Austria, along with Trevor Howard, Silvana Mangano, Helmut Griem, and Gert Fröbe. It is the third and final part of Visconti's "German Trilogy", following The Damned (1969) and Death in Venice (1971).

An international co-production by Italian producer Ugo Santalucia and West German producer Dieter Geissler, Ludwig was one of the most expensive European films at the time, and was a moderate success in its home territories, but was more lukewarmly received in the United States, where a heavily truncated 177-minute version was released. It was filmed in Munich and surrounding parts of Bavaria, and at Cinecittà Studios.

Ludwig won two David di Donatello Awards, for Best Film and Best Director, and was nominated for an Academy Award for Best Costume Design. Berger and Schneider both received German Film Award nominations for their acting, and Berger won a "Special David di Donatello" for his portrayal of the King.

== Plot ==
Munich, 1864. The 18-year-old, idealistic Ludwig II is crowned as the King of Bavaria. His first official act is a lavish support for the inspired but indebted composer Richard Wagner, who settled in Munich after Ludwig's request. Ludwig's cabinet cannot understand his support for the arts and is furious about Wagner's expensive lifestyle. Ludwig tries to find a faithful friend in Wagner, whose music he loves, but these hopes are shattered: behind the King's back, Wagner has an affair with Cosima von Bülow, the wife of Wagner's opportunistic conductor Hans von Bülow. In order to avoid a scandal, Wagner has to leave Munich. Ludwig continues to support Wagner and his projects, but he still mistrusts him.

Another important person for Ludwig is Empress Elisabeth of Austria, his independent and charismatic cousin. During a meeting with other aristocratic families in Bad Ischl, Elisabeth and Ludwig get close to each other and they share a kiss. However, Elisabeth is more interested in bringing up a marriage between her beautiful, cultivated sister Sophie and Ludwig, but the king ignores Sophie. Disappointed by Wagner and Elisabeth, Ludwig starts to withdraw from public into dream worlds. Ludwig wants Bavaria to stay neutral in the Austro-Prussian War of 1866, but his cabinet has another opinion and they eventually support the losing Austrian side. Ludwig ignores the war and stays in his castle, much to the irritation of his younger brother Otto and his close confidant Count Dürckheim. Dürckheim advises him to marry in order to prevent loneliness.

Shortly after Ludwig becomes aware of his homosexuality, he suddenly announces his engagement with Sophie in January 1867. His mother and the cabinet send an actress into his apartments, who is instructed to give him sexual experience. Ludwig feels angry about the actress and throws her into his bathtub. Ludwig has doubts if he can be a good husband to Sophie who loves him, and he postpones and eventually cancels the marriage. Instead, he starts having relationships with his servants, although the devout Catholic feels guilt about his homosexuality. Bavaria supports the Prussian army in the Franco-Prussian War of 1871, but during the following Unification of Germany, he loses much of his sovereignty to the Prussian emperor Wilhelm I and Chancellor Otto von Bismarck. Shortly after the Franco-Prussian War, the mental health of Ludwig's younger brother Otto declines and doctors have to take care of him. Ludwig is shocked by his brother's illness.

Ludwig does not care about politics anymore, instead, he spends his money building Neuschwanstein Castle, Linderhof Palace and Herrenchiemsee. The cabinet feels increasingly frustrated by the eccentric and secluded king's debts. In 1881, the king has a short but fierce friendship with actor Josef Kainz, whose Romeo performance he adores, but Kainz is mostly interested in the king's money. Ludwig also hosts some orgies, with naked or half-clothed farm boys hanging lazily on the branches of the Walküre ash tree in the middle of the interior of Hunding's Hut in the Linderhof Palace Park (filmed in the studio) or with cavalrymen from his Chevau-léger regiments in King's House on Schachen (filmed on location). When his cousin Elisabeth wants to visit him after a long time, he refuses to see her.

In 1886, the psychiatrist Bernhard von Gudden declares that Ludwig is insane, following the advice of his scheming Cabinet. With the help of his faithful servants, Ludwig can arrest his cabinet for a few hours. His friends advise him to fight against the accusation that he is insane, but he only feels world-weary and depressed. Eventually, his uncle Luitpold is declared Prince Regent of Bavaria. Ludwig is brought to Berg Castle near Lake Starnberg, where he has to stay under arrest and gets psychological treatment. Two days later, Ludwig and Von Gudden leave the castle for a walk. A few hours later, their corpses are found in the Lake Starnberg, dead by unknown causes.

== Cast ==
- Helmut Berger as Ludwig II of Bavaria
- Romy Schneider as Empress Elisabeth of Austria, or "Sissi"
- Trevor Howard as Richard Wagner
- Silvana Mangano as Cosima von Bülow
- Gert Fröbe as Father Hoffmann
- Helmut Griem as Count Dürckheim
- Umberto Orsini as Count von Holnstein
- John Moulder-Brown as Prince Otto
- Izabella Teleżyńska as the Queen Mother, Marie of Prussia
- Sonia Petrovna as Princess Sophie
- Folker Bohnet as Josef Kainz
- Heinz Moog as Professor Bernhard von Gudden
- Adriana Asti as Lila von Buliowski, actress
- Marc Porel as Richard Hornig, Ludwig's servant
- Nora Ricci as Countess Ida Ferenczy
- Mark Burns as Hans von Bülow
- Alexander Allerson as the Secretary of State, Franz von Pfistermeister
- Kurt Großkurth as Minister of Finance, Adolph von Pfretzschner
- Maurizio Bonuglia as Mayer, Ludwig's servant
- Bert Bloch as Weber, Ludwig's servant
- Anne-Marie Hanschke as Princess Ludovika, Elisabeth's mother
- Gérard Herter as Prince Luitpold
- Jan Linhar as Duke Maximilian Emanuel in Bavaria
- Clara Moustawcesky as Princess Helene
- Gernot Möhner as Karl Hesselschwerdt
- Wolfram Schaerf as Count von Crailsheim
- Karl-Heinz Peters as Washington
- Gunnar Warner as Prince Karl Theodor
- Raika Juri as Princess Mathilde
- Clara Colosimo as Mother Superior
- Karl-Heinz Windhorst as Dr. Müller
- Friedrich von Ledebur as Hofmarschall von Halsen

== Production ==
Ludwig was filmed at Cinecitta Studios in Rome, and on-location in Bavaria, West Germany. Filming took place at Roseninsel, Berg Castle, Lake Starnberg, Castle Herrenchiemsee, Castle Hohenschwangau, Linderhof Palace, Cuvilliés Theatre, Nymphenburg Palace, Ettal, Kaiservilla and Neuschwanstein Castle. Shooting began in late January 1972 and lasted six months.

Luchino Visconti, who was a distant relative of Ludwig II through Margarete von Bayern and Federico I Gonzaga, was fascinated by the story of the loner and esthete monarch and saw him as "the last absolutist ruler who preferred to rule with art rather than politics".

Much like The Damned and Death in Venice, Visconti shot Ludwig in English to account for the different nationalities in the cast (a mix of German, English, and Italian speakers). Scenes were shot silent (MOS) and then the actors looped their lines in post-production. While most of the German-speaking cast dubbed their own lines for the German release, Helmut Berger was replaced by a different actor due to his Austrian accent. In the Italian version, he was dubbed by Giancarlo Giannini.

During the last stages of production, on July 27, 1972, Visconti suffered a stroke. In the documentary The Life and Times of Count Luchino Visconti, screenwriter Enrico Medioli claimed the illness was caused by the sudden transition from the cold of the Austrian countryside to the heat of the Cinecittà soundstages.

== Music ==
Rather than an original score, the film uses pre-existing orchestral pieces by Richard Wagner (excerpts from Lohengrin, Tristan und Isolde, and Tannhäuser), Jacques Offenbach, and Robert Schumann. The film had the distinction of featuring a performance by Franco Mannino of the previously unpublished original piano composition by Wagner, Elegie in A Flat Major.

== Reception ==
=== Critical response ===
In America, where a heavily cut version was released, the film received mixed-to-negative reviews. Roger Ebert of the Chicago Sun-Times wrote "Perhaps only Visconti, who seems obsessed with the gloomy side of decadence, could have made Ludwig II of Bavaria seem boring." Vincent Canby of The New York Times wrote "Visconti has been such an intelligent film maker in the past that it's difficult to believe that Ludwig could be quite as bereft of ideas as it is." Robert Mazzocco of The New York Review of Books wrote "An unconscious parody of Visconti's own embattled romanticism, a diatribe against "privileged liberty," an old morality play in which the free soul is the damned soul-a dyspeptic Visconti, as it were, lecturing himself."

Retrospective reviews of the film's full director's cut have been more positive. Jonathan Romney for Film Comment wrote that "this full-length Ludwig... feels today like a painting whose images and forms can be at least freshly recognized." Bilge Ebiri wrote that "Built mostly around medium close-ups and dark interiors, the film creates a sense of isolation that matches the lead character's own state of mind."

=== Awards and nominations ===
Award	Year	Category	Nominee(s)	Result
Academy Award	1974	Best Costume Design	Piero Tosi	Nominated
David di Donatello	1973	Best Film		Won (tied with Alfredo, Alfredo)
David di Donatello	1973	Best Director	Luchino Visconti	Won
David di Donatello	1973	Special David	Helmut Berger	Won
German Film Award	1973	Best Actor	Helmut Berger	Nominated
German Film Award	1973	Best Actress	Romy Schneider	Nominated
Nastro d'Argento	1974	Best Director	Luchino Visconti	Nominated
Nastro d'Argento	1974	Best Producer	Ugo Santalucia	Nominated
Nastro d'Argento	1974	Best Screenplay	Luchino Visconti, Enrico Medioli, Suso Cecchi d'Amico	Nominated
Nastro d'Argento	1974	Best Supporting Actress	Silvana Mangano	Nominated
Nastro d'Argento	1974	Best Cinematography	Armando Nannuzzi	Won
Nastro d'Argento	1974	Best Production Design	Mario Chiari	Won
Nastro d'Argento	1974	Best Costume Design	Piero Tosi	Won
Valladolid International Film Festival	1973	Golden Spike	Luchino Visconti	Won

== Censorship and alternate versions ==
The director's cut by Visconti was over four hours long, which the film's distributors deemed as too long. Ludwig was then shortened to three hours at the premiere in Bonn on 18 January 1973. The cutback was without Visconti's consent, but the director, who was in bad health after a stroke during filming, was not able to stop it. The depiction of Ludwig's homosexuality caused a controversy, particularly in Bavaria, where King Ludwig was admired by many Conservatives. Among the critics was Franz Josef Strauß, then chairman of the CSU and later Minister President of Bavaria, who also attended the film's premiere. The distributors feared controversy and, without consent by Visconti and without consulting him, cut another 55 minutes from the premiere version, reducing the film to two hours. Scenes with homosexual hints and some of the more philosophical dialogues in the film were cut in order to make the film more popular with mainstream audiences.

There are at least four different versions of the film, which according to the All Movie Guide "suffers greatly when shortened, as every moment is essential to the story". German film critic Wolfram Schütte wrote that those who saw the shortened version "haven't seen the film". The film was restored to its four-hour length by Ludwig-film editor Ruggero Mastroianni and Ludwig-screenwriter Suso Cecchi d'Amico in 1980, four years after Visconti's death, and had its premiere at the Venice Film Festival.

In April 2017, Arrow Video released a blu-ray/DVD "limited edition" restoration, including both the full-length theatrical edition at 238 minutes, and a five-part "television version" of the film. The blu-ray edition was restored in 2K resolution from the original 35mm camera negative. Elements that had been censored from some earlier releases, such as allusions to Ludwig's homoerotic longing and occasional glimpses of male nudity, are included in Arrow's home video restoration. In addition to the Italian language soundtrack, the Arrow release optionally includes the film's English audio for the first time on home video. The soundtrack was originally created for the 173-minute U.S. version and, as such, portions of the full-length presentation intermittently revert to the Italian dialogue to the extent an English version was either not recorded or not preserved. It appears that some of the principal actors, including Helmut Berger in the lead role, spoke English during the shoot. The limited edition disk set also included a booklet insert about the film and a number of featurettes about the film and its creative team.
