= Fiorenzo Carpi =

Italian composer and pianist

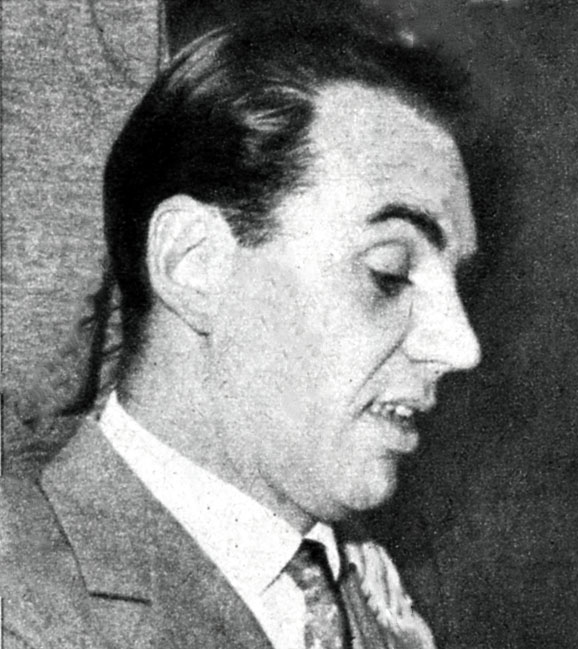
- Born: 19 October 1918; Milan, Kingdom of Italy
- Died: 21 May 1997 (aged 78); Rome, Italy
- Occupation: composer

Fiorenzo Carpi De Resmini (19 October 1918 – 21 May 1997) was an Italian composer and pianist, probably best known for the "Pinocchio" theme.

== Biography ==
My theater ... is held together by the notes of Fiorenzo Carpi. Very often his music has given me, since the beginning or during the work, the inner "clarification" I needed, the lighting of an "everything" that I did not understand ..

— Giorgio Strehler

Born in Milan, in 1945 Carpi graduated at the Milan Conservatory, pupil of Arrigo Pedrollo and Giorgio Federico Ghedini; then he was a stable member of Piccolo Teatro di Milano since its founding (1947). He also collaborated with the Nobel laureate playwright Dario Fo on all his plays between 1953 and 1967, then more sporadically until Carpi's death in 1997. Fo's 1997 play Il diavolo con le zinne (The Devil with Boobs) featured an homage to Carpi following his death.

Carpi was a prolific film score composer, well known for his long collaboration with the director Luigi Comencini. In 1981 he won the David di Donatello for Best Score for Comencini's Eugenio. He also composed numerous pop songs, television scores, commercial jingles, symphonic and chamber opera works.

== Selected filmography ==
- Fugitive in Trieste (1951)
- Zazie dans le Métro (1960)
- Leoni al sole (1961)
- A Very Private Affair (1962)
- Paris, My Love (1962)
- I cuori infranti (1963)
- I 4 tassisti (1963)
- Misunderstood (1966)
- Death on the Run (1967)
- Italian Secret Service (1968)
- Giacomo Casanova: Childhood and Adolescence (1969)
- The Howl (1970)
- Splendori e miserie di Madame Royale (1970)
- Million Dollar Eel (1971)
- Without Family (1972)
- The Adventures of Pinocchio (1972)
- A White Dress for Marialé (1972)
- Till Marriage Do Us Part (1974)
- Simona (1974)
- La Chair de l'orchidée (1975)
- The First Time on the Grass (1975)
- Salon Kitty (1976)
- Traffic Jam (1979)
- Eugenio (1980)
- Sweet Pea (1981)
- The Wounded Man (1983)
- Cuori nella tormenta (1984)
- La Storia (1986)
- Italian Night (1987)
- Merry Christmas... Happy New Year (1989)
- The Handsome Priest (1989)
- The Amusements of Private Life (1990)
- See You in Hell, Friends (1990)
- The End Is Known (1993)
