= Laura Antonelli =

Italian actress (1941–2015)

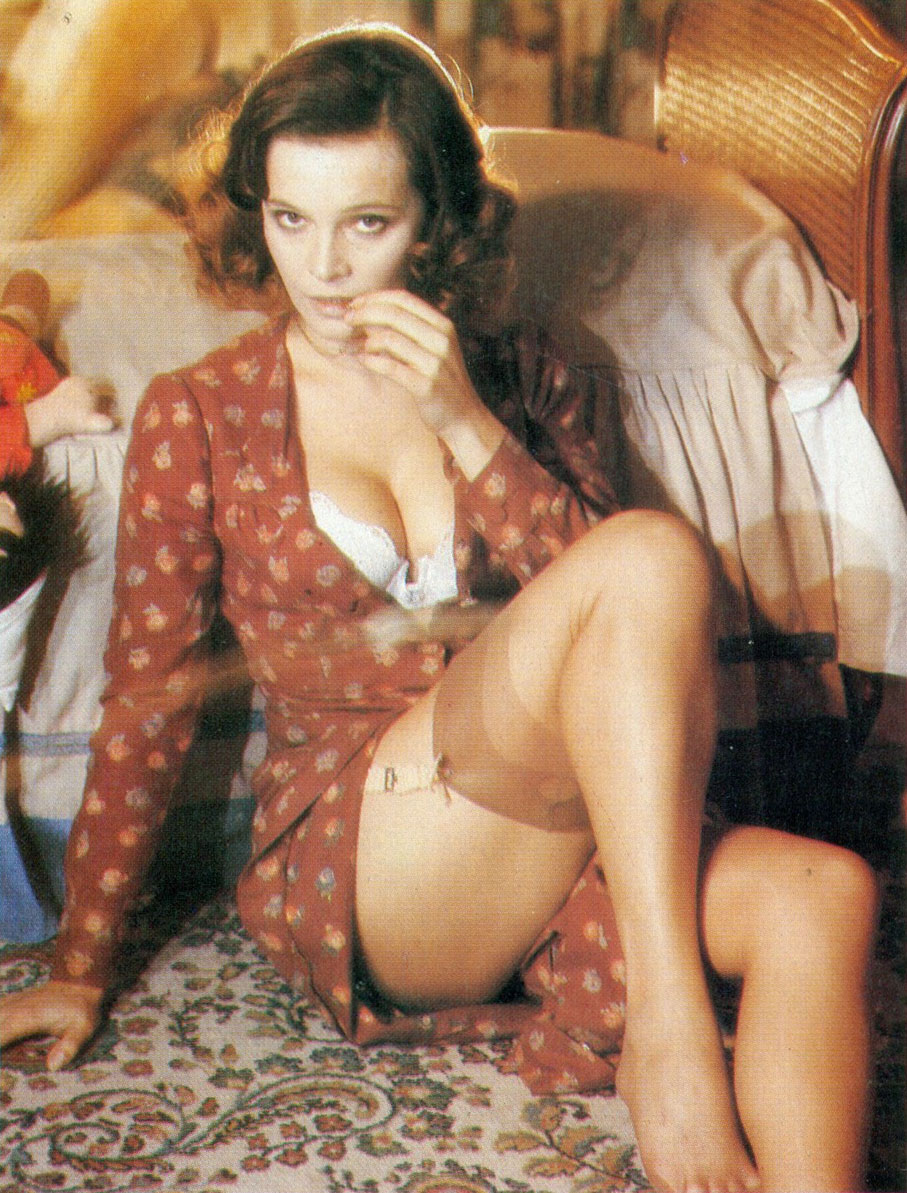
- Antonelli in the movie Malicious (1973)
- Born: Laura Antonaz; 28 November 1941; Pula, Kingdom of Italy (now Croatia)
- Died: 22 June 2015 (aged 73); Rome, Italy
- Occupations: Actress; teacher; model
- Years active: 1964–1991
- Known for: Malizia; L'innocente; Passione d"Amore; Till Marriage Do Us Part
- Spouse: Enrico Piacentini
- Partner(s): Jean-Paul Belmondo (1972–1980)
- Children: 1
- Awards: Nastro d'Argento for Best Actress

Laura Antonelli (née Antonaz; 28 November 1941 – 22 June 2015) was an Italian film actress who appeared in 45 films between 1964 and 1991.

== Early years ==
Antonelli was born in Pola, Kingdom of Italy (today, Pula, Croatia), former capital of Istria. After the war, her parents fled what was then Yugoslavia, lived in Italian refugee camps and eventually settled in Naples, where her father found work as a hospital administrator. Antonelli had a childhood interest in mathematics, but as a teenager, she became proficient at gymnastics. In an interview for The New York Times, she recalled, "My parents had made me take hours of gym classes during my teens ... They felt I was ugly, clumsy, insignificant and they hoped I would at least develop some grace. I became very good, especially in rhythmical gym, which is a kind of dance."

Setting aside ambitions to make a career in mathematics, she graduated as a gymnastics instructor. She moved to Rome, where she became a secondary-school gym teacher and was able to meet people in the entertainment industry, who helped her find modelling jobs.

== Career ==
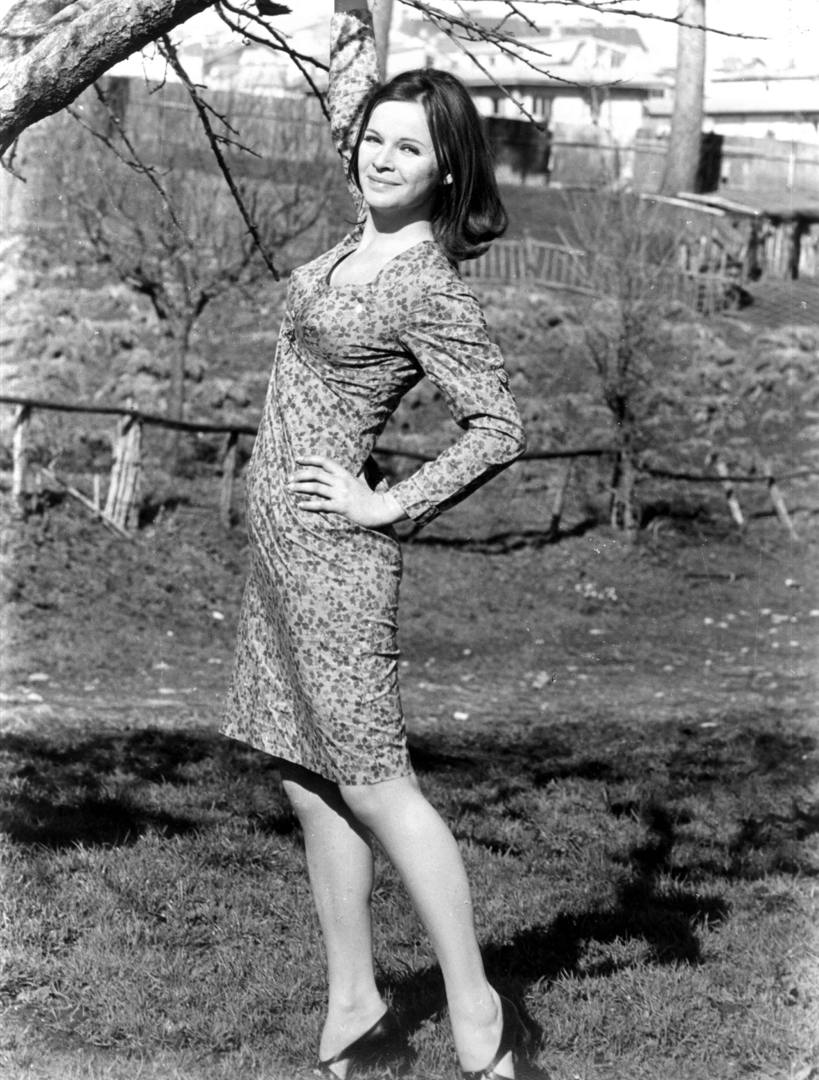
Antonelli in Milan, Italy (1974)

Antonelli's earliest engagements included Italian advertisements for Coca-Cola. In 1965, she made her first feature-film appearance in Le sedicenni, although her performance went uncredited. Her American debut came in 1966 in Dr. Goldfoot and the Girl Bombs. Other roles followed; her breakthrough came in 1973's Malizia. She appeared in a number of sex farces such as Till Marriage Do Us Part (1974).

She worked in more serious films, as well, including Luchino Visconti's last film, The Innocent (1976). In Wifemistress, a romance film of 1977, she played a repressed wife experiencing a sexual awakening. Later, she appeared in Passion of Love (1981). From 1986 she mostly worked on Italian television series. Antonelli's final film role was in the sequel Malizia 2000 (1991), following which she retired. She won the Italian National Syndicate of Film Journalists Award, Nastro d'Argento, in 1974 for Malizia.

== Personal life ==
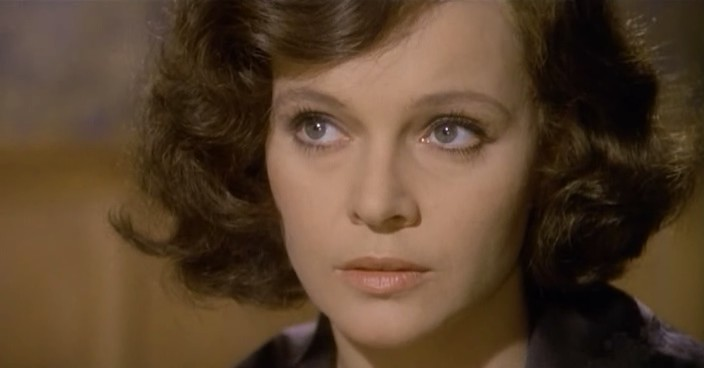
Antonelli in Till Marriage Do Us Part (1974)

Antonelli was married to publisher Enrico Piacentini; they later divorced. From 1972 to 1980, she was in a relationship with French actor Jean-Paul Belmondo.

In 1991, Antonelli was convicted of possession and dealing of cocaine and sentenced to house arrest. In 2006, the conviction was overturned by the Italian court of appeals, who ordered the Ministry of Justice to pay the actress 108,000 euros.

Antonelli died in Ladispoli on 22 June 2015, aged 73, from a heart attack.

== Filmography ==
Year	Title	Role	Notes	Ref.
1964	The Magnificent Cuckold	—N/a	Uncredited appearance Guest with a Beehive Hairdo at the Artusis	
1965	16 Year Olds			
1966	Dr. Goldfoot and the Girl Bombs	Rosanna		
1967	Pardon, Are You For or Against?	Piera Conforti		
1968	La Rivoluzione sessuale	Liliana		
1969	Detective Belli	Franca	Uncredited appearance	
1969	The Archangel	Elena	Uncredited appearance	
1969	Venus in Furs	Wanda von Dunajew		
1970	A Man Called Sledge	Ria		
1970	Bali	Daria		
1970	Gradiva	Gradiva		
1971	The Married Couple of the Year Two	Pauline de Guérandes		
1971	Without Apparent Motive	Juliette Vaudreuil		
1971	Secret Fantasy	Costanza Vivaldi		
1972	The Eroticist	Sister Delicata		
1972	Dr. Popaul	Martine Dupont		
1973	How Funny Can Sex Be?	Madame Juliette ("Madam, it's eight o'clock"); Celestina ("Two hearts and a shack"); Enrico's Wife ("It's never too late"); Grazia ("Honeymoon trip"); Tamara ("Come back my little one"); The Nun ("Italian worker abroad"); Donna Mimma Maccò ("Revenge"); Tiziana ("The guest")		
1973	Malicious (aka Malizia)	Angela	Nastro d'Argento for Best Actress	
1974	Lovers and Other Relatives	Laura		
1974	Simona	Simona		
1974	Till Marriage Do Us Part	Eugenia di Maqueda		
1975	The Divine Nymph	Manoela Roderighi		
1976	The Innocent	Giuliana Hermil		
1977	Wifemistress	Antonia De Angelis		
1977	Tre scimmie d'oro			
1977	Black Journal	Sandra		
1979	Tigers in Lipstick	The Wife / The Businesswoman		
1979	Hypochondriac	Tonina		
1979	Inside Laura Antonelli			
1980	I'm Getting a Yacht	Roberta		
1981	Passion of Love	Clara		
1981	Il turno	Stellina		
1981	Chaste and Pure	Rosa Di Maggio		
1982	Porca vacca	Mariana		
1982	Sesso e volentieri	Carla De Dominicis / Supermarket client / The Princess		
1982	Viuuulentemente mia	Anna Tassotti		
1985	Slices of Life	Monica Belli		
1985	The Trap	Marie Colbert		
1986	The Venetian Woman	Angela		
1986	Grandi magazzini	Elèna Anzellotti		
1987	Rimini Rimini	Noce Bove		
1987	Roba da ricchi	Mapi Petruzzelli	Segment II	
1989	Disperatamente Giulia	Carmen Milkovič		
1990	The Miser	Frosina		
1991	Malizia 2000	Angela	final film role	

== TV appearances ==
- Gli indifferenti (miniserie televisiva) (1988) (miniseries) as Lisa
- Disperatamente Giulia (1989) (miniseries) as Carmen Milkovich
