= Conversation Piece (film) =

1974 film by Luchino Visconti

- Italian theatrical release poster
- Italian: Gruppo di famiglia in un interno
- Directed by: Luchino Visconti
- Written by: Suso Cecchi d'Amico; Enrico Medioli; Luchino Visconti
- Produced by: Giovanni Bertolucci
- Starring: Burt Lancaster; Helmut Berger; Silvana Mangano; Claudia Marsani; Stefano Patrizi; Romolo Valli; Claudia Cardinale; Dominique Sanda
- Cinematography: Pasqualino De Santis
- Edited by: Ruggero Mastroianni
- Music by: Franco Mannino
- Production company: Rusconi Film; Gaumont
- Distributed by: Cinema International Corporation (Italy); Gaumont Distribution (France)
- Release dates: 10 December 1974 (Milan); 20 December 1974 (Italy); 19 March 1975 (France)
- Running time: 121 minutes
- Countries: Italy; France
- Language: English
- Box office: $29,946

Conversation Piece (Italian: Gruppo di famiglia in un interno) is a 1974 drama film directed, co-written, and produced by Luchino Visconti. It stars Burt Lancaster, Helmut Berger, Silvana Mangano, and Romolo Valli; with cameo appearances by Claudia Cardinale and Dominique Sanda. The film explores such themes as the collision between old and new, imminence of death, existential crises, and the sociopolitical gap between generations. The title refers to an informal group portrait, especially those painted in Britain in the 18th century, beginning in the 1720s.

== Plot ==
A retired American professor lives a solitary life in a luxurious palazzo in Rome, surrounded by pieces of art and books. He barely maintains contact with people other than his long-time housekeeper Erminia, but even that contact is characterized by detachment. One day, the rich but vulgar Countess Brumonti (her husband is a right-wing industrialist who does not appear) rings his doorbell. She manages to talk the Professor into renting the empty apartment on the upper floor of the palazzo to her, her much younger lover Konrad, her teenage daughter Lietta, and Lietta's fiancé Stefano, a conservative entrepreneur.

The Professor is calmly disturbed by the pushy new tenants who immediately have their apartment rebuilt, examine the Professor's apartment for clues to his past, throw parties, and have amorous experiences with each other (including Konrad with the Countess's daughter). But, in addition to the annoyance, the Professor feels animated by the young people; he is particularly drawn to the provocative, opaque Konrad. Konrad's past as a gigolo and as a leftist radical in the protests of 1968 who then slipped into drugs, is alluded to—a sharp contrast to the Professor's former completely different life that had been shaped by an upper-class upbringing and the experiences of World War II. Occasionally, the Professor sinks into memories of his former wife and mother. The Professor and Konrad have a common interest in art and become closer friends after Konrad is beaten up one night because of gambling debts and the Professor finds him and provides medical care.

The Professor invites the Countess, Konrad, Lietta, and Stefano to a dinner, at which he calls them his "new family" and at the same time expresses satisfaction that they have brought liveliness to his measured life with their move-in. However, a dispute arises among his guests about Konrad's dubious past and his relationship with the Countess. Although she wants to separate from her husband, she does not want to marry Konrad, who is significantly younger and is socially beneath her. Konrad then reveals that he spied on her husband for supporting far-right groups. This was not for business, but for fear of being arrested in Spain's Franco dictatorship. The Countess and Stefano then distance themselves from Konrad. The Professor rejects their reactionary views but does not intervene to support Konrad.

Konrad goes upstairs after saying goodbye to his new "father" by the letter he signed "Your son", suggesting that they would probably not see each other alive again. Immediately afterwards there is a gas explosion in which Konrad is killed. The Professor blames himself for Konrad's death and falls seriously ill.

The last scene shows him on his deathbed when the countess visits him with Lietta. The Countess tells the Professor that Konrad committed suicide—in order to hurt everyone who loved him—but that Konrad was too young to realize that, in time, everyone would forget him. After the Countess leaves the room, Lietta tells the Professor "Don't believe her. He didn't kill himself; they murdered him." Lietta leaves; the Professor is now alone. Becoming overcome with grief or despair, he gazes upward and clasps his hands as though in prayer to God or to something he might long to believe in.

== Cast ==
- Burt Lancaster as The Professor
- Helmut Berger as Konrad Hübel
- Silvana Mangano as Marchesa Bianca Brumonti
- Claudia Marsani as Lietta Brumonti
- Stefano Patrizi as Stefano, Lietta's fiancé
- Romolo Valli as Michelli, Professor's lawyer
- Elvira Cortese as Erminia, Professor's housekeeper
- Philippe Hersent as Domenico, the porter
- Guy Tréjan as first art dealer
- Jean-Pierre Zola as Blanchard, second art dealer
- Umberto Raho as first Police inspector
- Enzo Fiermonte as second Police inspector
- Dominique Sanda as the Professor's mother (uncredited)
- Claudia Cardinale as the Professor's wife (uncredited)

== Production ==
The film features an international cast including the American actor Burt Lancaster, the Austrian Helmut Berger, the Italians Silvana Mangano and Claudia Cardinale (in a very short role as the professor's wife), and the French actress Dominique Sanda in a cameo as the professor's mother. Visconti offered the role of Countess Brumonti to Audrey Hepburn, before Mangano was cast. The movie was shot in English language; however, an Italian dubbed version was also produced at the time, in which Lancaster's and Berger's lines are dubbed into Italian by actors Massimo Foschi and Adalberto Maria Merli.

Before shooting even started, the photos of the audition of the fifteen-year-old Claudia Marsani without a blouse were put into circulation, and the director was asked about it. Luchino Visconti replied: "Well, I made the girl take off her blouse because she has to do a nude scene in the film, and I wanted to make sure she was beautiful too undressed." Teresa Ann Savoy auditioned for her part, before Marsani was cast.

The main character was based on art critic and scholar Mario Praz. The English film title is a nod to Praz's book Conversation Pieces: A Survey of the Informal Group Portrait in Europe and America. In an interview, Praz recalls how the situation described in the movie (a group of young and loud tenants moving into the old palazzo where he lived, disrupting his peace) happened for real a few months after the movie was released.

== Reception ==
On review aggregator website Rotten Tomatoes, the film holds an approval rating of 78% based on nine reviews.

Louder Than War's Jamie Havlin gave the film eight points out of ten, commenting: "This penultimate film by Visconti is one obviously affected by the director’s poor health. Due to a stroke suffered a couple of years earlier, it became necessary for the filming to be as simple as possible, which meant that everything was a shot in a set constructed entirely in the studio.... The acting is generally very good, especially the lead performance of Burt Lancaster, whose health and vitality Visconti craved during the shoot, while the costumes and sets are immaculately designed and the cinematography, despite the indoors setting, is often outstanding. Few, if any, would regard this as his masterpiece, but Conversation Piece is still a fascinating slice of cinema from a master filmmaker, and though minor by his standards, I’d much rather watch it than anything currently showing at my local multiplex."

A reviewer for Time Out London stated: "If the dolce vita-style intrusion is given distinctly Jacqueline Susann-like overtones by the rather dissociated dialogue in the English language version, Conversation Piece nevertheless comes across as a visually rich and resonant mystery, far more fluid and sympathetic than Death in Venice."

A reviewer for Variety wrote: "Conversation Piece eschews the usually operatic, museum-like pix of Luchino Visconti for a touching tale of the generation gap and the loss of life-contact of an intellectual."

James Evans of Starburst gave the movie eight points out of ten, noting: "As he approached the twilight of his career, Burt Lancaster had made the switch from youthful action star to subtle character acting and that’s in clear evidence here in his sad-eyed, melancholic performance. Visconti creates a world outside of time in the professor’s house (there’s no other set) that’s at once artificially unreal and emblematic of his interior life. It’s a sumptuous and beautiful film, lushly made, contemplative and rich in subtext that should reward further viewings."

Adrian Turner of Radio Times gave the film three stars out of five, adding: "All the usual Visconti themes—the collision of cultures, the clash between old and new, the imminence of death—are covered in his customary opulent fashion. The film reunited the director with Burt Lancaster, who starred in The Leopard."

Vincent Canby of The New York Times gave the film a negative review, writing: "Mr. Lancaster, fine old professional that he is, is awful, adopting that humble, Birdman of Alcatraz manner he uses when employed in what he apparently thinks is serious movie-making. Conversation Piece is the kind of fatuous film that the professionally pragmatic Burt Lancaster, the action movie hero, would snort at and leave in the middle of. A Disaster."

=== Awards and nominations ===
- Blue Ribbon Award
  - Winner: Best Foreign Film – Luchino Visconti
- David di Donatello
  - Winner: Best Film
  - Winner: Best Foreign Actor – Burt Lancaster
- Nastro d'Argento
  - Winner: Best Director – Luchino Visconti
  - Winner: Best Producer – Giovanni Bertolucci
  - Winner: Best New Actress – Claudia Marsani
  - Winner: Best Cinematography – Pasqualino De Santis
  - Winner: Best Production Design – Mario Garbuglia
  - Nominated: Best Actress – Silvana Mangano
  - Nominated: Best Original Story – Enrico Medioli
  - Nominated: Best Screenplay – Suso Cecchi d'Amico, Luchino Visconti, Enrico Medioli
  - Nominated: Best Score – Franco Mannino
- Japan Academy Film Prize
  - Winner: Outstanding Foreign Language Film
- Kinema Junpo Award
  - Winner: Best Foreign Language Film Director – Luchino Visconti
- Valladolid International Film Festival
  - Winner: Best Film

== Censorship ==
The film was censored in Spain for the nude and political content and because Francisco Franco's daughter and son-in-law are mentioned. Nevertheless, it was re-released there, uncut, in 1983. The word cunt was removed from its UK original release but restored on the British DVD edition.
