= The Damned (1969 film) =

1969 film by Luchino Visconti

- American film poster
- Italian: La caduta degli dei
- Directed by: Luchino Visconti
- Written by: Nicola Badalucco; Enrico Medioli; Luchino Visconti
- Produced by: Ever Haggiag; Alfred Levy
- Starring: Dirk Bogarde; Ingrid Thulin; Helmut Griem; Helmut Berger; Renaud Verley; Umberto Orsini; Albrecht Schoenhals; René Koldehoff; Florinda Bolkan; Charlotte Rampling
- Cinematography: Armando Nannuzzi; Pasqualino De Santis
- Edited by: Ruggero Mastroianni
- Music by: Maurice Jarre
- Production companies: Praesidens; Pegaso Cinematografica; Ital-Noleggio Cinematografico; Eichberg-Film
- Distributed by: Ital-Noleggio Cinematografico (Italy); Warner Bros.-Seven Arts (International)
- Release dates: 14 October 1969 (Rome premiere); 16 October 1969 (Italy); 27 January 1970 (West Germany)
- Running time: 154 minutes
- Countries: Italy; West Germany; Switzerland
- Languages: English; German
- Budget: $2 million
- Box office: 2,638,507 admissions (France) $1.2 million (US/Canada rentals)

The Damned (Götterdämmerung) (Italian: La caduta degli dei, lit. 'The Fall of the Gods'; German: Die Verdammten) (Note: The Italian title La caduta degli dei is the conventional translation of the term Götterdämmerung (with its Wagnerian association), but for the German version, the title Die Verdammten ("The Damned") was chosen. All versions, however, use Götterdämmerung as a subtitle.) is a 1969 historical drama film directed by Luchino Visconti, from a screenplay he co-wrote with Nicola Badalucco and Enrico Medioli. It stars Dirk Bogarde, Ingrid Thulin, Helmut Berger, Helmut Griem, Umberto Orsini, Charlotte Rampling, Florinda Bolkan, Reinhard Kolldehoff and Albrecht Schönhals in his final film.

Set in 1930s Germany, the film centers on the Essenbecks, a wealthy industrialist family who have begun doing business with the Nazi Party, and whose amoral and unstable heir is embroiled in his family's machinations. The film's story and characters are loosely based on the German Krupp family of steel industrialists from Essen, who became prominent supporters of the Nazi regime beginning in 1931. The Damned is the first part of Visconti's thematic "German Trilogy", followed by Death in Venice (1971).

Principal photography of The Damned took place in locations throughout Italy, West Germany, and Austria. The film opened to widespread critical acclaim, but also faced controversy from ratings boards for its sexual content. In the United States, the film was given an X rating by the MPAA, which was lowered to a more marketable R after 12 minutes of offending footage were cut.

Visconti won the Nastro d'Argento for Best Director, and was nominated for a Best Original Screenplay Oscar with co-writers Nicola Badalucco and Enrico Medioli. Helmut Berger received a Golden Globe nomination for Most Promising Newcomer. The film won the Golden Peacock (Best Film) at the 4th International Film Festival of India.

== Plot ==
In Germany in early 1933, the Essenbecks are a wealthy and powerful industrialist family who have, reluctantly, begun doing business with the newly elected Nazi government. On the night of the birthday of the family's conservative patriarch, Baron Joachim von Essenbeck, a member of the old German nobility who detests the upstart Adolf Hitler, the family's children have prepared performances. Joachim's grandnephew Günther plays a classical piece on his cello, while his grandson Martin performs a drag performance, which is interrupted by news that the Reichstag is burning. Assuming Hitler will use this incident to seize even greater control, Joachim announces at dinner that he is replacing Herbert Thallman, an outspoken anti-Nazi who is married to Joachim's niece Elizabeth, with his boorish and unscrupulous nephew Konstantin, who is an officer in the SA, as vice president of the family steelworks.

Martin's possessive mother, Sophie, has been in a relationship with Friedrich Bruckmann, an ambitious executive of the steelworks, for some time, but he has not proposed because he worries Joachim would not approve of him as the husband of the widow of Joachim's beloved son. Friedrich is friendly with Aschenbach, an Essenbeck relation who has attained a high position in the SS, (Note: Aschenbach's SS rank is anachronistic, as the "Hauptsturmführer" rank did not exist until late 1934—after the film's events—when it replaced the equivalent rank of Sturmhauptfuhrer.) and, acting on Aschenbach's suggestions that things would be better for him if the anti-Nazi Joachim were to die, Friedrich kills Joachim and frames Herbert for the crime by using his personal handgun. Herbert narrowly escapes abroad, but, in his haste, is forced to leave behind Elizabeth and their two daughters. Martin inherits the majority of shares in the steelworks, and Sophie manipulates him into placing Friedrich, rather than Konstantin, in charge.

Aschenbach convinces Friedrich and Martin to bar their company from selling weapons to the SA, in hopes of marginalizing the rival group and currying the favor of the army, whose might Hitler will need in order to conquer territories beyond the current German borders. Konstantin discovers that Martin has been sexually abusing his nieces and Lisa Keller, a young Jewish neighbor of Martin's girlfriend who commits suicide, and he uses this information to resume providing the SA with weapons and get Martin to call a meeting to place him in charge of the company. Sophie finds Martin hiding in the attic of the family castle and, mostly for Friedrich's sake, agrees to help free him from Konstantin's blackmail. She meets up with Aschenbach, who reveals that Hitler is planning to purge the SA, as he feels its work securing Nazi power in Germany is done, but its leader, Ernst Röhm, is unlikely to quietly let it take a back seat to the SS and army.

Many high-ranking members of the SA, including Konstantin, gather at a hotel in Bad Wiessee. They have a drunken celebration, and the evening ends with the officers engaging in sex with one another. At dawn, the hotel is stormed by SS troops, who slaughter the SA members. Konstantin is personally executed by Friedrich, whom Aschenbach brought along to make him do his own dirty work.

Friedrich is now in control of the steelworks, and Sophie even gets Aschenbach to arrange a decree that gives him her father-in-law's last name and noble title of Baron so they will be able to marry as equals. He is affected by all of his newfound power, and Aschenbach begins to feel that he is not displaying the appropriate subservience to National Socialism, so Aschenbach offers to help Martin destroy Sophie and Friedrich. Martin accepts, as he is bitter that his mother has used him to benefit Friedrich and herself.

During a family dinner, Friedrich announces that Aschenbach, Günther, and Martin must submit themselves to his will and whims, since he is now the head of the family. Herbert surprises everyone when he enters and reveals that, although Sophie had supposedly made arrangements for Elizabeth and her daughters to join Herbert in exile, they were really arrested and sent to Dachau, where Elizabeth died. Now a broken man, Herbert has returned to confess to murdering Joachim, in exchange for the release of his daughters. Günther, upset by this news, is enraged when Martin reveals that Friedrich killed Konstantin, and Aschenbach is able to use his hate to radicalize him to the Nazi cause.

Martin sexually assaults his mother, and she falls into a catatonic state. Without her help to strategize against Aschenbach and Martin, Friedrich is lost. Martin, who is now part of the SS, gets Friedrich and Sophie to go through the motions of getting married before ordering them to take cyanide capsules, which they willingly consume, killing them both. He inherits control of the steelworks, and the Essenbeck empire thereby comes under Nazi control.

== Cast ==
- Dirk Bogarde as Friedrich Bruckmann, an executive at the Essenbeck steelworks, and Sophie's partner
- Ingrid Thulin as Sophie von Essenbeck, Joachim's widowed daughter-in-law
- Helmut Griem as Hauptsturmführer Aschenbach, Joachim's nephew
- Helmut Berger as Martin von Essenbeck, Sophie's son
- Renaud Verley as Günther von Essenbeck, Konstantin's son
- Umberto Orsini as Herbert Thallmann, Elizabeth's husband, and an executive at the Essenbeck steelworks
- Reinhard Kolldehoff (credited as René Koldehoff) as Konstantin von Essenbeck, Joachim's nephew, and an executive at the Essenbeck steelworks
- Albrecht Schoenhals (credited as Albrecht Schönhals) as Joachim von Essenbeck, the patriarch of the Essenbeck family
- Florinda Bolkan as Olga, Martin's girlfriend
- Nora Ricci as Governess to Thilde and Erika
- Charlotte Rampling as Elizabeth Thallmann, Joachim's niece
- Irina Wanka (credited as Irina Vanka) as Lisa Keller, Olga's young neighbor
- Karin Mittendorf as Thilde Thallmann, Elizabeth and Herbert's eldest daughter
- Valentina Ricci as Erika Thallmann, Elizabeth and Herbert's youngest daughter
- Wolfgang Hillinger as Janek, Konstantin's valet
- Bill Vanders as the Chief of Police, who investigates Joachim's murder
- Howard Nelson Rubien as the Dean of the University, attended by Günther
- Karl-Otto Alberty as a Wehrmacht officer
- Klaus Höhne as a Brownshirt

von Essenbeck Family Tree

Joachim's Mother	Joachim's Father
Joachim's Wife	Joachim	Sibling	Sibling	Sibling
Friedrich Bruckmann	Sophie	Joachim's Son	Konstantin's Wife	Konstantin	Aschenbach	Elizabeth	Herbert Thallman
Olga	Martin	Günther	Thilde	Erika

== "The German Trilogy" ==
The Damned has been regarded as the first of Visconti's films described as "The German Trilogy", followed by Death in Venice (1971) and Ludwig (1973), and the character Aschenbach even shares the same name as the protagonist of Thomas Mann's Death in Venice. Author Henry Bacon, in his book Visconti: Explorations of Beauty and Decay (1998), specifically categorizes these films together in a chapter titled "Visconti & Germany".

Visconti's earlier films had analyzed Italian society during the Risorgimento and post-WWII periods. Peter Bondanella's Italian Cinema (2002) depicts the trilogy as a move to take a broader view of European politics and culture. He says that, stylistically, "they emphasize lavish sets and costumes, sensuous lighting, painstakingly slow camerawork, and a penchant for imagery reflecting subjective states or symbolic values."

== Production ==
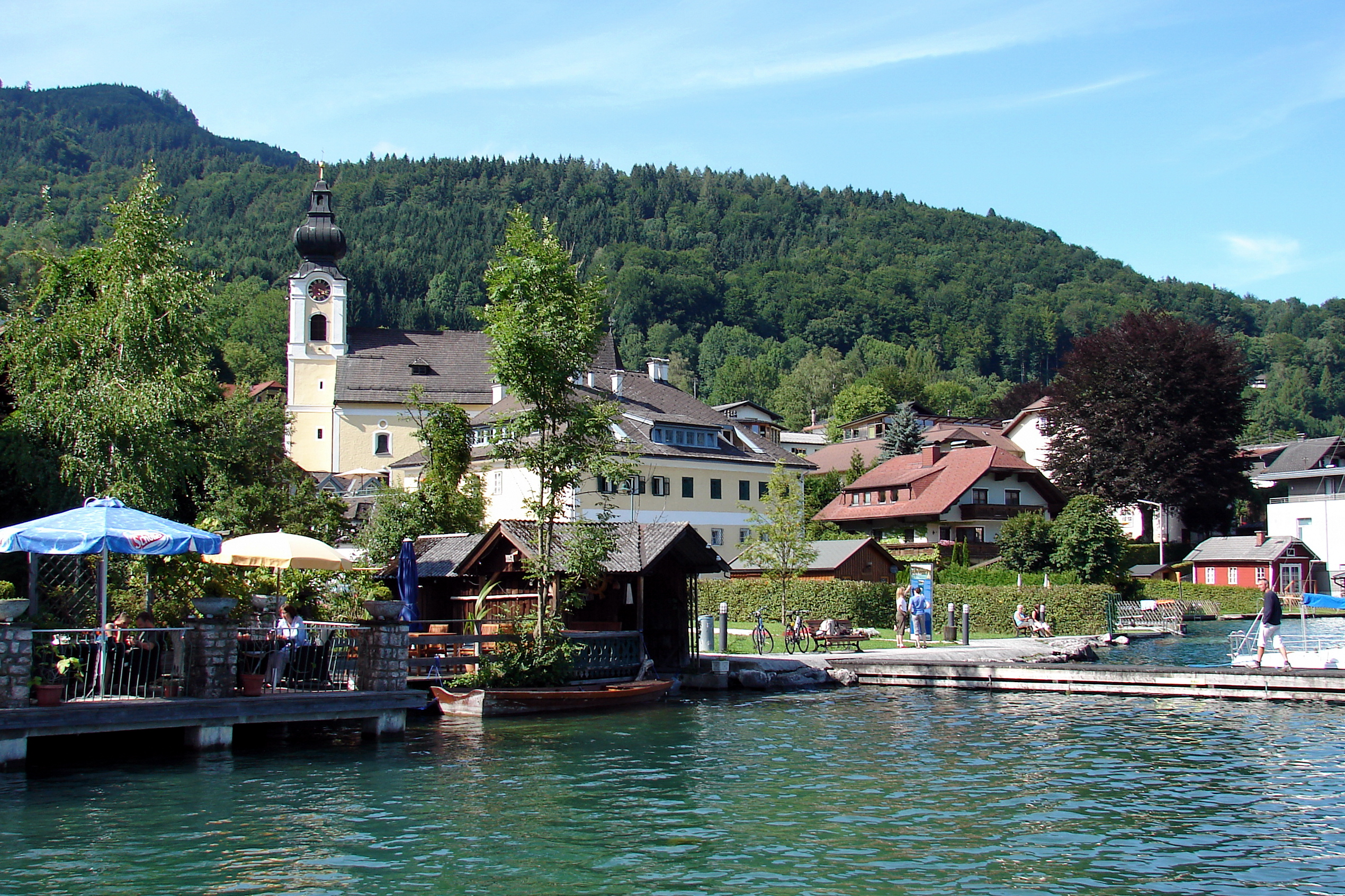
Unterach am Attersee, where the "Night of Long Knives" sequence was filmed.

The film was shot on location in West Germany and Austria, and at Cinecittà Studios in Rome. Locations included Düsseldorf, Essen, and Unterach am Attersee - the latter doubling for Bad Wiessee. The scenes of the Essenbeck steelworks were shot in Terni, Italy.

The Damned was the breakthrough film for Helmut Berger, who is given an "Introducing" credit, even though he had already appeared in Visconti's segment of the anthology film The Witches. At the time, Berger was in a romantic relationship with Visconti. Dirk Bogarde later expressed disappointment with Visconti for sacrificing his character's development to place a greater focus on Berger's Martin. In his memoirs, Bogarde specifically cites a long scene showing Friedrich becoming overwhelmed with guilt after murdering Joachim, which was filmed, but cut.

Composer Maurice Jarre was hired by the producers without the knowledge of Visconti, who originally wanted the film scored entirely with pre-existing classical music by Mahler and Wagner. Visconti reportedly was dissatisfied with the composer's efforts, which he compared disparagingly to Jarre's work on Doctor Zhivago, but was forced to use the music due to contractual obligations.

In Visconti's preferred, primarily English-language version of the film, most of the cast members provide their own voices, but Umberto Orsini is dubbed by an uncredited actor, due to his accent.

Nazi war criminal Karl Hass appeared in the film as an extra. Hass was a perpetrator of the Ardeatine massacre, but was not charged or convicted until 1998, allegedly due to his work as an American agent against the Soviet Union in the 1950s. It's unknown if the filmmakers were aware of Hass' identity when he appeared in the film, though some sources suggest he was employed as a technical advisor. Hass did appear as an extra in several other Italian films during the 1960s and '70s, including two about the Ardeatine massacre.

== Reception ==
The Damned was released to worldwide acclaim. It was nominated for Best Original Screenplay at the 42nd Academy Awards, and was named one of the Top Foreign Films of 1969 by the National Board of Review. Among the international cast, Helmut Berger was singled out for his performance as Martin, a vicious sexual deviant who uses his amoral appetites to achieve his own twisted ends. The film was the tenth-most popular release at the French box office in 1970.

Retrospectively, the film has appeared on such critics' lists as The New York Times Guide to the Best 1,000 Movies Ever Made and Halliwell's Top 1000: The Ultimate Movie Countdown. On the review aggregator website Rotten Tomatoes, 83% of 18 critics' reviews are positive.

The film's entry in the Lexikon des Internationalen Films praises its presentation of the connection between "moral decadence, sexual neurosis, aestheticist death wish, narcissist self-centeredness and political opportunism", but comments that this effect is weakened somewhat by the film's "decorative circuitousness and artificial stylisation".

Filmmaker Rainer Werner Fassbinder called The Damned his favorite film. He said it is "perhaps the greatest film, the film that I think means as much to the history of film as Shakespeare to the history of theater".

=== Censorship and ratings ===
After the first screening of the film, 12 minutes were cut, including the scene where Lisa hangs herself after being molested. For the initial American release, much of the Bad Wiessee/Night of the Long Knives sequence was cut.

In 1969, the film was given an "X" rating by the MPAA due to a nude incest scene. Warner Bros. submitted the film for re-classification in 1979, and the rating was changed to "R". This uncut but re-rated version was released on DVD in 2004

The film was shown on CBS late night television on Monday, Feb. 28, 1972. It was heavily edited by 25 minutes, so much that one executive reportedly joked it should be retitled The Darned. Even with the cuts for television, affiliate stations in Baltimore and Washington D.C. refused to carry the broadcast. Technically, it was the first X-rated film to be shown on American network television.

== Home media ==
The film was released on DVD by Warner Home Video in 2004.

A 2K restoration of the film by the Cineteca di Bologna and Institut Lumière was released on Blu-ray and DVD by The Criterion Collection on 28 September 2021. All of the previously censored footage was restored to the film for both of these home video releases.
