= Paola Quattrini =

Italian actress

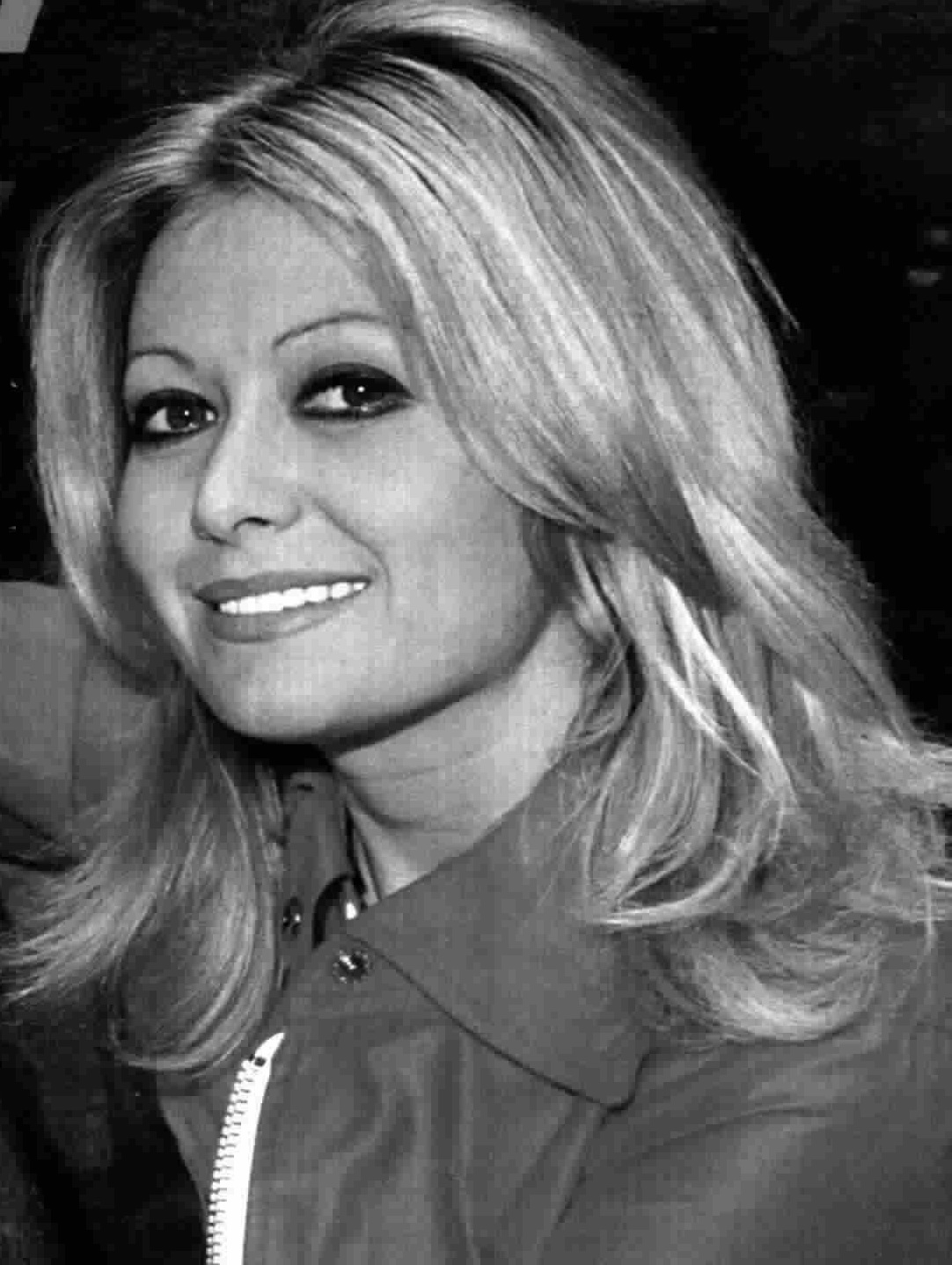
- Quattrini in 1972
- Born: 9 March 1944 (age 82); Rome, Italy
- Occupation: Actress
- Years active: 1949–present
- Children: Selvaggia Quattrini

Paola Quattrini (born 9 March 1944) is an Italian actress.

== Career ==
Quattrini was born in Rome, Italy. She debuted as child actor in Il bacio di una morta (1949). From then she started a very long career between stage, film and television, starring in hundreds of productions. In 1993 she won a Nastro d'Argento for Best Supporting Actress for Pupi Avati's Fratelli e sorelle. In 2004 the President of the Italian Republic Carlo Azeglio Ciampi has conferred her the honor of Commander of the Order of Merit of the Italian Republic, for a life dedicated to the cinema, television and theater.

In 2009 she published the semi-autobiographical novel A.M.O.R.E.

== Filmography ==
=== Films ===
Year	Title	Role	Notes
1949	Il bacio di una morta	Little Lilia	Cameo appearance
1950	Stormbound	Nina	
1951	Tragic Spell	Camilla	
1951	Operation Mitra	Young woman	Uncredited
1951	Quo Vadis	Crying girl	Uncredited
1951	Revenge of a Crazy Girl	Child Annamaria	
1952	What Price Innocence?	Ada	
1953	The Secret of Three Points	Luisa	
1953	Passionate Song	Fiorella	
1953	Madonna delle rose	Pia Venturi	
1954	Guai ai vinti	Mirella	
1955	The White Angel	Anna Carani	
1955	Girls of Today	Simonetta Bardellotti	
1956	The Intruder	Bettina	
1958	Hercules	Young Iole	
1959	First Love	Andreina Palazzi	
1959	Attack of the Moors	Princess Maria	
1961	Scandali al mare	Mariolina	
1961	Le magnifiche 7	Paoletta	
1963	I cuori infranti	Lisa Von Tellen	
1964	I soldi	Various	Anthology film
1968	The Most Beautiful Couple in the World	Paola	
1972	The Case of the Bloody Iris	Marylin	
1972	Incensurato provata disonestà carriera assicurata cercasi	Zaccherin's mistress	
1974	La governante	Elena	
1975	City Under Siege	Anna	
1975	L'ammazzatina	Rosalba Galluzzo	
1977	Death Hunt	Paola Corsi	
1979	Riavanti… Marsch!	Sofia	
1982	Di padre in figlio	Herself	Documentary film
1987	My First Forty Years	Marina's mother	
1989	Le finte bionde	Giovanna	
1990	Alcune signore per bene	Annabella	
1992	Brothers and Sisters	Lea	
1995	I Don't Speak English	Patrizia	
1996	Festival	Mirna	
1999	La bomba	Alba	
1999	Branchie	Eugenia	
2014	... E fuori nevica!	Giacomo's sister	
2016	Abbraccialo per me	Countess Annamaria	

=== Television ===
Year	Title	Role	Notes
1959–1960	Giallo Club: Invito al poliziesco	Jenny	2 episodes
1961	The Lady from the Sea	Ilda	Television movie
1965	La maschera e il volto	Wanda Sereni	Television movie
1969–1970	Scooby-Doo, Where Are You!	Daphne Blake (voice)	Main role; italian voice-over
1971	I mostri sacri	Liane	Television movie
1972	I demoni	Ljzaveta	Miniseries
1972–1973	The New Scooby-Doo Movies	Daphne Blake (voice)	Main role; italian voice-over
1973	Puccini	Gianna	2 episodes
1974	Philo Vance	Muriel Clair	Miniseries
1979	Scooby Goes Hollywood	Daphne Blake (voice)	Television movie
1980	Quattro grandi giornalisti	Flaminia	Miniseries
1983–1984	Urusei Yatsura	Lum (voice)	Lead role; italian voice-over
1999	Fine secolo	Elisabetta Rinaldi	Main role; 5 episodes
2006, 2018	Don Matteo	Lucilla Respighi	Recurring role; 4 episodes
