= Brothers and Sisters (1992 film) =

- Directed by: Pupi Avati
- Starring: Franco Nero; Paola Quattrini; Anna Bonaiuto; Enrica Maria Modugno; Consuelo Ferrara; Luciano Federico; Stefano Accorsi; Lino Capolicchio
- Cinematography: Roberto D'Ettore
- Music by: Riz Ortolani
- Release date: 1992
- Country: Italy
- Language: Italian

Fratelli e sorelle, internationally released as Brothers and Sisters, is an Italian drama film directed by Pupi Avati. It was entered in the 1992 Venice Film Festival. For her performance in this film, Paola Quattrini won a Nastro d'Argento for Best supporting Actress.

== Cast ==
- Stefano Accorsi as Matteo
- Anna Bonaiuto as Gloria
- Paola Quattrini as Lea
- Lidia Broccolino as Elsa
- Franco Nero as Franco
- Matthew Buzzel as Scott
- Lino Capolicchio as Aldo
- Luciano Federico as Francesco
- Consuelo Ferrara
