= Death on the Run =

1967 film directed by Sergio Corbucci

- Italian film poster
- Directed by: Sergio Corbucci
- Screenplay by: Massimo Patrizi; Franco Rossetti; Sergio Corbucci
- Story by: Massimo Patrizi
- Produced by: Clemente Fracassi; William Sachs
- Starring: Ty Hardin; Michael Rennie; Paola Pitagora; Vittorio Caprioli; Gordon Mitchell; Graziella Granata
- Cinematography: Aiace Parolin
- Edited by: Alberto Gallitti
- Music by: Ivan Vandor; Fiorenzo Carpi
- Production companies: Heritage Enterprises; Cineriz; Rizzoli Film
- Distributed by: Cineriz
- Release date: 1967
- Running time: 92 minutes
- Countries: Italy; United States
- Languages: Italian; English

Death on the Run (Italian: Bersaglio mobile), also known as Moving Target, is a 1967 Italian Eurospy film directed by Sergio Corbucci. Filmed in Athens, it was referred as a film directed with "whip-along style and dubious sense of humour".

== Plot ==
A handcuffed man named Jason is flown into Athens airport where Inspector Starkis is waiting for him. Jason, however, escapes, unaware that Bulgarian Demetrius is helping him. While searching for his friend Pizza at the Gold Star club, Jason is kidnapped by Demetrius, photographed next to a dead woman, and blackmailed into working for him. Jason infiltrates a prison and removes a tooth from a corpse. He then double crosses Demetrius and takes refuge in a bar. There, he phones Pizza but the phone is bugged by both the police and a mysterious Albanian, who sends two gunmen to kill him. Jason eventually escapes and the gunmen are shot by the police.

Major Worthington Clark, a British agent cooperating with the local police, meets his colleague Lloyd, and they agree to monitor Jason's activities. Jason arranges to meet Pizza, but is intercepted by the Albanian and his henchmen, who are in turn attacked by Demetrius and the police. A gunfight ensues, in which henchmen are killed.

Jason makes contact with Pizza and gives him the tooth for safekeeping. Jason also asks him to also create a fake tooth. He is advised to contact a tour guide at the Parthenon, but the informant is killed by the Albanian, who then chases Jason through Athens. The police try to trap Jason by retracting a bridge, but Jason jumps the gap successfully - unlike the Albanian who has to swim to safety.

At the Acropolis, Jason meets guide Greta, the supposedly dead woman from the photograph. The Albanian arrives and threatens them both. Jason hands over the fake tooth, but then disarms the Albanian allowing himself and Greta to escape. At the Gold Star club, he tries to persuade Pizza to join him in a scheme to make money out of the different groups who are chasing him. However, Pizza turns him down. Rumba, a dancer at the club, agrees to act as their go between.

Jason meets Greta after work, and gets her to drive him to the disused factory he is using as a hideout. She had been forced to work for Demetrius to have her sister's child released from behind the Iron Curtain. Greta's sister had been in a relationship with a Bulgarian agent, who had got to Greece with valuable information - he was the dead man whose tooth everyone is searching for. Jason agrees to give Greta the tooth, so she can swap it for her niece's freedom.

While driving away, Greta is followed by the Albanian, who tortures and kills her. Jason contacts Rumba to arrange that Pizza gives him the tooth, but she instead tells Demetrius's henchman - whom she is actually working for. Suspicious, Jason goes to Rumba's room, but Demetrius and his men also arrive at the hotel. In the ensuing fight, Jason is wounded while Demetrius, his henchmen and Rumba are killed. Major Clark saves Jason by killing a henchman and reveals that the tooth contains a microfilm with a list of double agents - he offers Jason money and a new passport in exchange for the tooth.

Jason goes to the club to retrieve it, but finds that the Albanian has abducted Pizza. Starkis arrives, but Jason escapes and steals a police car, leading Clark to the factory where the Albanian is torturing Pizza. Jason enters the factory, kills the Albanian and his henchmen and rescues Pizza, who reveals that the tooth has been hidden in Jason's keyring the whole time. Clark steals the keyring and hands Jason over to Starkis. Jason soon escapes, hides in Clark's car and forces him to give back the tooth.

In negotiations with Clark and Lloyd, Jason demands 40,000 dollars, a passport, and that Greta's niece be released. He suggests that the communists might exchange the child for a spy, and then reveals that he knows Clark to be a double agent working for the Russians. Lloyd agrees to the deal and the exchange takes place, while Clark reveals that he had made a copy of the microfilm, so both sides will have access to the names. Jason hands the child to Pizza. Starkis then arrests Jason, who escapes again.

== Cast ==
- Ty Hardin as Jason
- Michael Rennie as Clark
- Paola Pitagora as Greta
- Vittorio Caprioli as Pizza
- Gordon Mitchell as the Albanian
- Graziella Granata as Rumba
- Jason Poe as Inspector Starkis
- Eril Shippers as Demetrius the Bulgarian
- Val MacKey as Demetrius's henchman
