= Till Marriage Do Us Part =

1974 film

- Directed by: Luigi Comencini
- Written by: Ivo Perilli; Luigi Comencini
- Produced by: Pio Angeletti; Adriano De Micheli
- Starring: Laura Antonelli; Alberto Lionello; Michele Placido
- Cinematography: Tonino Delli Colli
- Edited by: Nino Baragli
- Music by: Fiorenzo Carpi
- Release date: October 24, 1974
- Running time: 92 minutes
- Country: Italy
- Language: Italian

Till Marriage Do Us Part (Italian: Mio Dio, come sono caduta in basso!, also known as How Long Can You Fall?) is a 1974 Italian erotic comedy film written and directed by Luigi Comencini and starring Laura Antonelli. Released in the U.S. in 1979, it was nominated for the 37th Golden Globe Award for Best Foreign Language Film.

== Plot ==
In Sicily at the beginning of the twentieth century, two noble families are celebrating the wedding of Raimondo and Eugenia. After the pair leave the festivities for the bedroom, a telegram is slipped under the door: it says that they are brother and sister. For reasons of inheritance and decorum, they reluctantly agree to stay married but sleep apart. Eugenia regrets her enforced chastity and, on their honeymoon in Paris, accepts the advances of a French baron. However, when she admits that she is still a virgin, he disappears quickly. Back in Sicily she is driven to mass by the chauffeur, who stops at an isolated hut and possesses her. These trysts continue until the chauffeur is found to have been helping himself not only to the mistress but also to the household silver. At his trial, she reluctantly identifies him.

When Raimondo goes off to war in Africa, Eugenia becomes friends with Evelyn, a free-spirited journalist. After Raimondo returns as a hero, the two women are bicycling in the country and pass the hut where Eugenia lost her virginity. Evelyn thinks it would be a good idea to for the two of them to make love on the same spot until, peering through the door, they see Raimondo atop a peasant girl. He is then elected to the Parliament in Rome and takes an apartment there. When Eugenia goes to visit him, he suggests that instead of tedious chastity they should taste the ultimate forbidden pleasure of incest. Eugenia is undressed on the bed when the telephone rings: an urgent message from Sicily says that they are not brother and sister after all. The idea of ordinary conjugal sex does not excite either of them.

Italy joins in the First World War and Raimondo dies at the front. Eugenia volunteers as a nurse and is tending badly-wounded soldiers when she recognises one: it is the ex-chauffeur. After the war she decides to go to Paris, where she finds that the only man to whom she offered herself, the baron, is dead. One evening when she is in her underclothes, there is a knock and in comes the ex-chauffeur, the only man she has had sex with, now recovered from his wounds. She is afraid he wants revenge for being jailed, but he only wants to resume where they left off.

== Cast ==
- Laura Antonelli as Eugenia Di Maqueda
- Alberto Lionello as Raimondo Corrao, Marquis Di Maqueda
- Michele Placido as Silvano Pennacchini
- Jean Rochefort as Baron Henri De Sarcey
- Ugo Pagliai as Ruggero Di Maqueda
- Rosemarie Dexter as Florida
- Karin Schubert as Evelyn
- Michele Abruzzo as Don Pacifico

== See also ==
- List of Italian films of 1974
