= Leoni al sole =

- Directed by: Vittorio Caprioli
- Written by: Raffaele La Capria; Vittorio Caprioli
- Cinematography: Carlo Di Palma
- Edited by: Nino Baragli
- Music by: Fiorenzo Carpi
- Distributed by: Variety Distribution
- Release date: 1961
- Country: Italy
- Language: Italian

Leoni al sole is a 1961 Italian comedy drama film. It is the directorial debut of Vittorio Caprioli.

In 2008, the film was included on the Italian Ministry of Cultural Heritage’s 100 Italian films to be saved, a list of 100 films that "have changed the collective memory of the country between 1942 and 1978."

In 2008, it was restored and shown as part of the retrospective "Questi fantasmi: Cinema italiano ritrovato" at the 65th Venice International Film Festival.

== Cast ==
- Vittorio Caprioli as Giugiú
- Franca Valeri as Giulia
- Philippe Leroy as Mimí
- Serena Vergano as Serena
- Carlo Giuffrè as Zazà
- Enzo Cannavale as the Commissioner
- Anna Campori
- Evi Marandi
- Luciana Gilli
- Mia Genberg
- Pia Genberg
