= You're on Your Own =

- Directed by: Mauro Bolognini
- Written by: Leonardo Benvenuti, Piero De Bernardi
- Produced by: Cineriz
- Starring: Peppino De Filippo, Totò, Franca Valeri
- Cinematography: Carlo Carlini
- Edited by: Roberto Cinquini
- Music by: Carlo Rustichelli
- Distributed by: Cineriz
- Release date: 1959
- Running time: 105 minutes
- Country: Italy
- Language: Italian

Arrangiatevi!, internationally released as You're on Your Own, is a 1959 Italian comedy film directed by Mauro Bolognini.

In 2008, the film was included on the Italian Ministry of Cultural Heritage’s 100 Italian films to be saved, a list of 100 films that "have changed the collective memory of the country between 1942 and 1978."

== Plot summary ==
Peppino and his family move into a "brothel", i.e., an apartment inhabited by a group of prostitutes in the ancient streets of Rome. One of the girls mysteriously died, and so the house was bought by the family just in time for Peppino, who is forced to share with another family. Because of the gossips of the city and the neighborhood, in a short time Peppino's family falls into disgrace. Peppino, not knowing what to do as a father, comes to discover that his daughter has serious problems with her boyfriend.

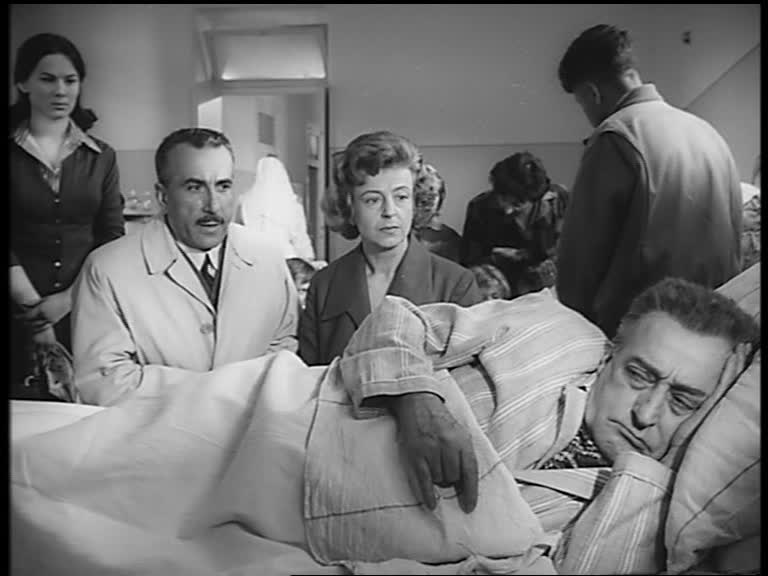
Photo from Arrangiatevi! with (from left) Peppino De Filippo, Laura Adani and Totò lying in bed.

== Cast ==
- Peppino De Filippo as Peppino Armentano
- Totò as Grandpa Illuminato
- Laura Adani as Maria Armentano
- Cristina Gajoni as Maria Berta Armentano
- Cathia Caro as Bianca Armentano
- Vittorio Caprioli as Pino Calamai
- Franca Valeri as Marisa
- Adriana Asti as la ragazza di Felice
- Giorgio Ardisson as Romano
- Marcello Paolini as Nicola Armentano
- Enrico Olivieri as Salvatore Armentano
- Achille Majeroni as il nonno istriano
- Giusi Raspani Dandolo as la madre istriana
- Luigi De Filippo as Neri
- Giuliano Gemma as un pugile al peso
