= Villa Mirafiori =

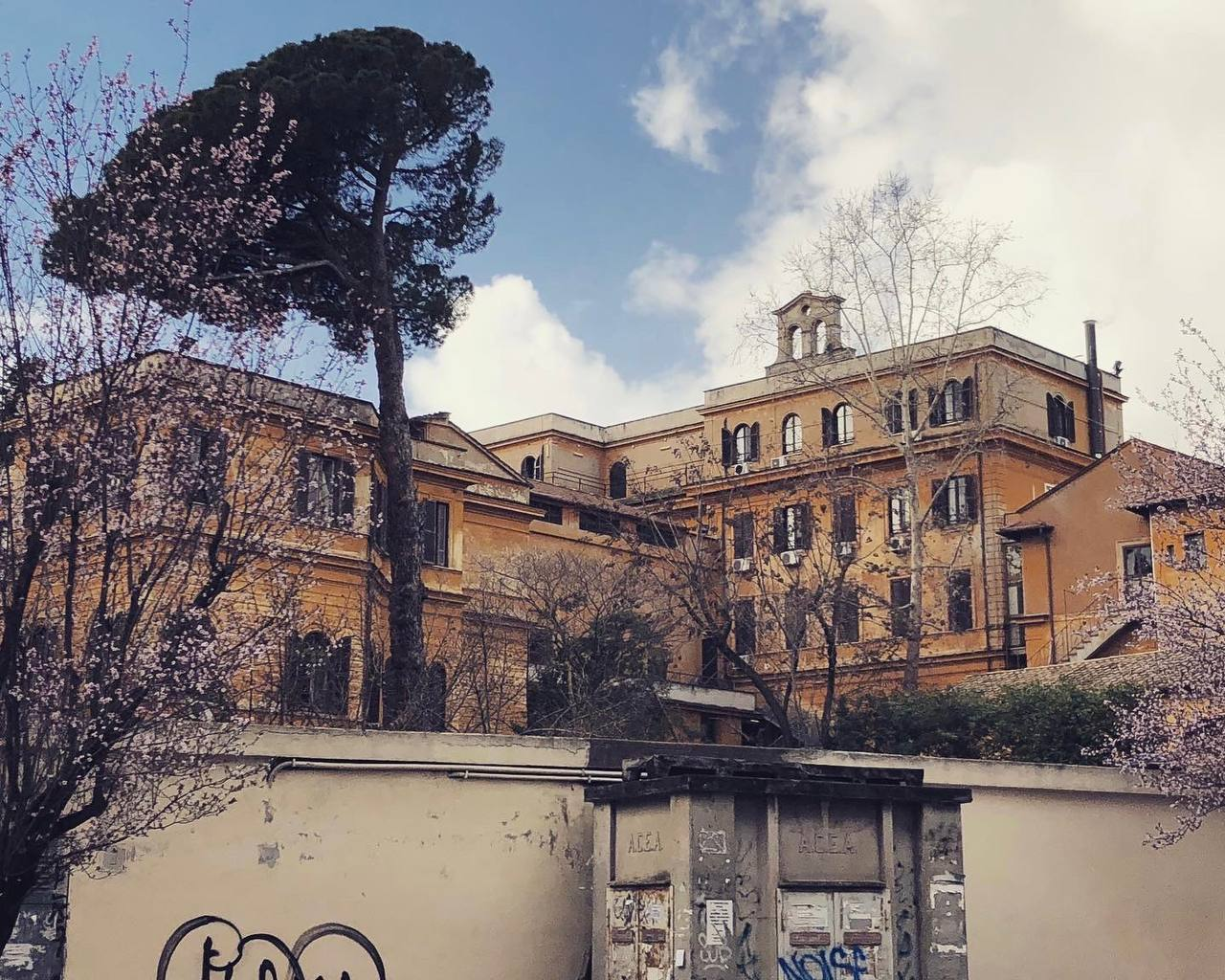
- View of Villa Mirafiori
- Interactive map of the Villa Mirafiori area

General information
- Status: In use
- Type: Historic villa
- Architectural style: Neo-Renaissance
- Location: Via Nomentana, 118 (historic entrance); Via Carlo Fea, 2 (current entrance), Rome, Lazio, Italy
- Current tenants: University campus
- Year built: 1874–1878
- Client: Victor Emmanuel II
- Owner: Sapienza University of Rome

Design and construction
- Architect: Enrico Kielfrer

Villa Mirafiori is a Neo-Renaissance-style villa in Rome, Italy, located along Via Nomentana. Today its exterior walls are currently ochre yellow. It is one of the campuses of the Faculty of Letters and Philosophy of Sapienza University of Rome.

== History ==
The villa was built between 1874 and 1878 as the official residence of Rosa Vercellana, Countess of Mirafiori and favourite of King Victor Emmanuel II. At the time, the king had just moved with his court from Florence to Rome—which had recently become the capital of the Kingdom of Italy following the breach of Porta Pia in 1870—where he resided in the Quirinal Palace, in addition to having the hunting estate of Villa Ada on Via Salaria.

A suitable suburban area was therefore identified and purchased, not far from the other two properties on the Nomentana, Villa Torlonia and Villa Massimo. The villa was built here in Neo-Renaissance style on three floors, with an entrance loggia, two slightly projecting side wings and an eclectic bell tower. The residence was decorated with stuccoes, stained glass, marble fireplaces and mosaic floors, and was surrounded by a perimeter garden designed by Emilio Richter, a landscape architect of German origin and director of the royal villas and parks, who arranged for two lakes, a greenhouse and an aviary to be installed there.

The Countess of Mirafiori enjoyed the villa for only a few years: three months after she and the king contracted a civil marriage at Villa Mirafiori itself (on 7 October 1877), Victor Emmanuel died (on 9 January 1878) and Vercellana moved to Pisa, where she spent the rest of her life. As a result, the large landed property that originally surrounded the residence was partly subdivided and sold. From 1930 the villa served as the mother house of the Ladies of the Sacred Heart, until it was purchased in 1975 by "La Sapienza" University; in those years scenes from two films set in the 19th century were also shot there: The Innocent by Luchino Visconti (1976), based on the novel of the same name by D'Annunzio, and Beyond Good and Evil by Liliana Cavani (1977), inspired by the life of Nietzsche. Following the necessary works to adapt the rooms, on 2 December 1980 Villa Mirafiori was turned into the seat of the then institutes of philosophy and languages, which with the 2010 reform became two departments of the Faculty of Letters and Philosophy.

After the Department of Languages moved to the Marco Polo building in November 2017, the building has housed the Department of Philosophy and part of the Department of Developmental psychology (pedagogy).

== Gallery ==
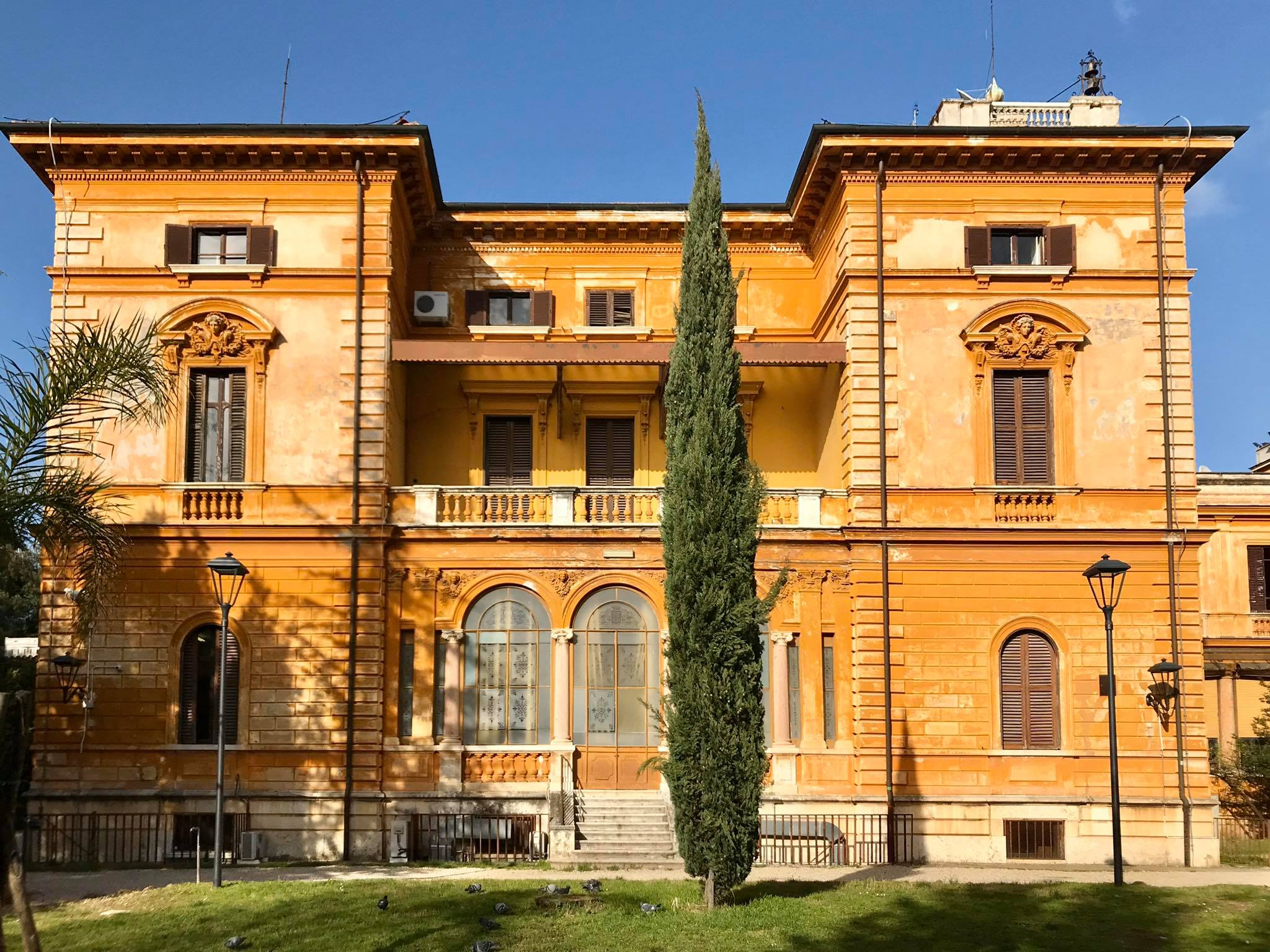
The south façade, originally the main façade of the historic villa, with its entrance loggia

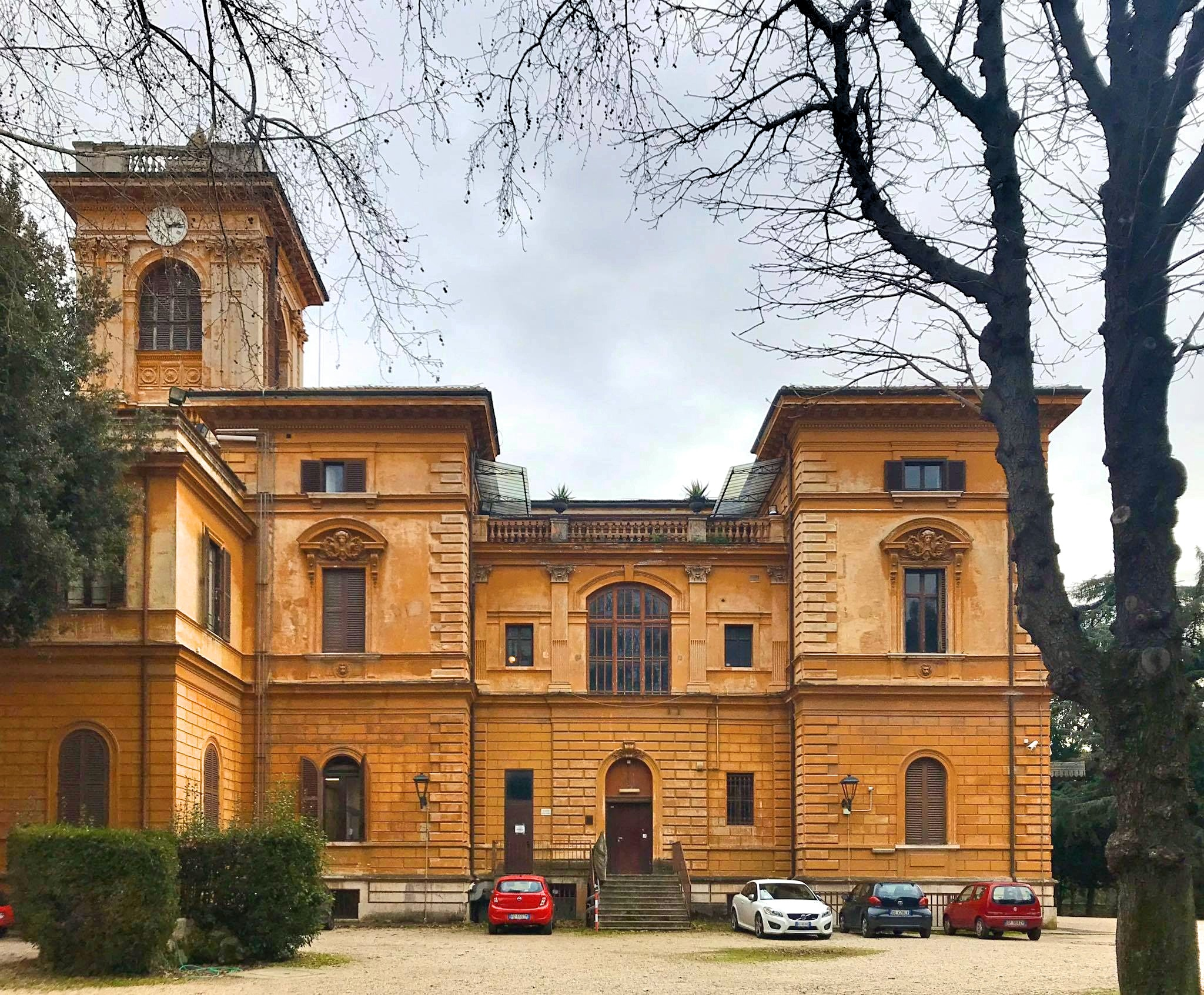
The north façade. The bell tower is visible on the left

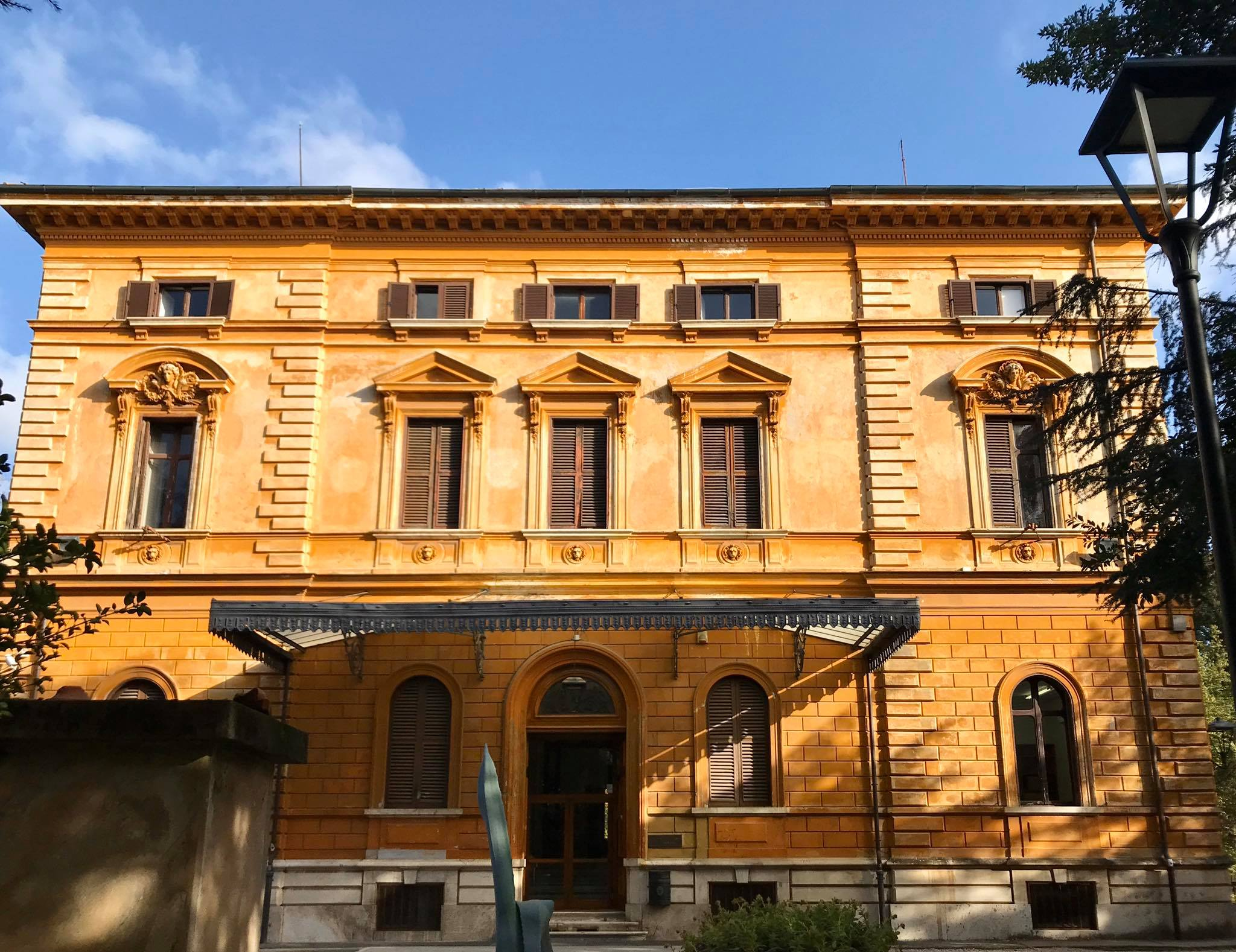
The west façade, with the iron canopy

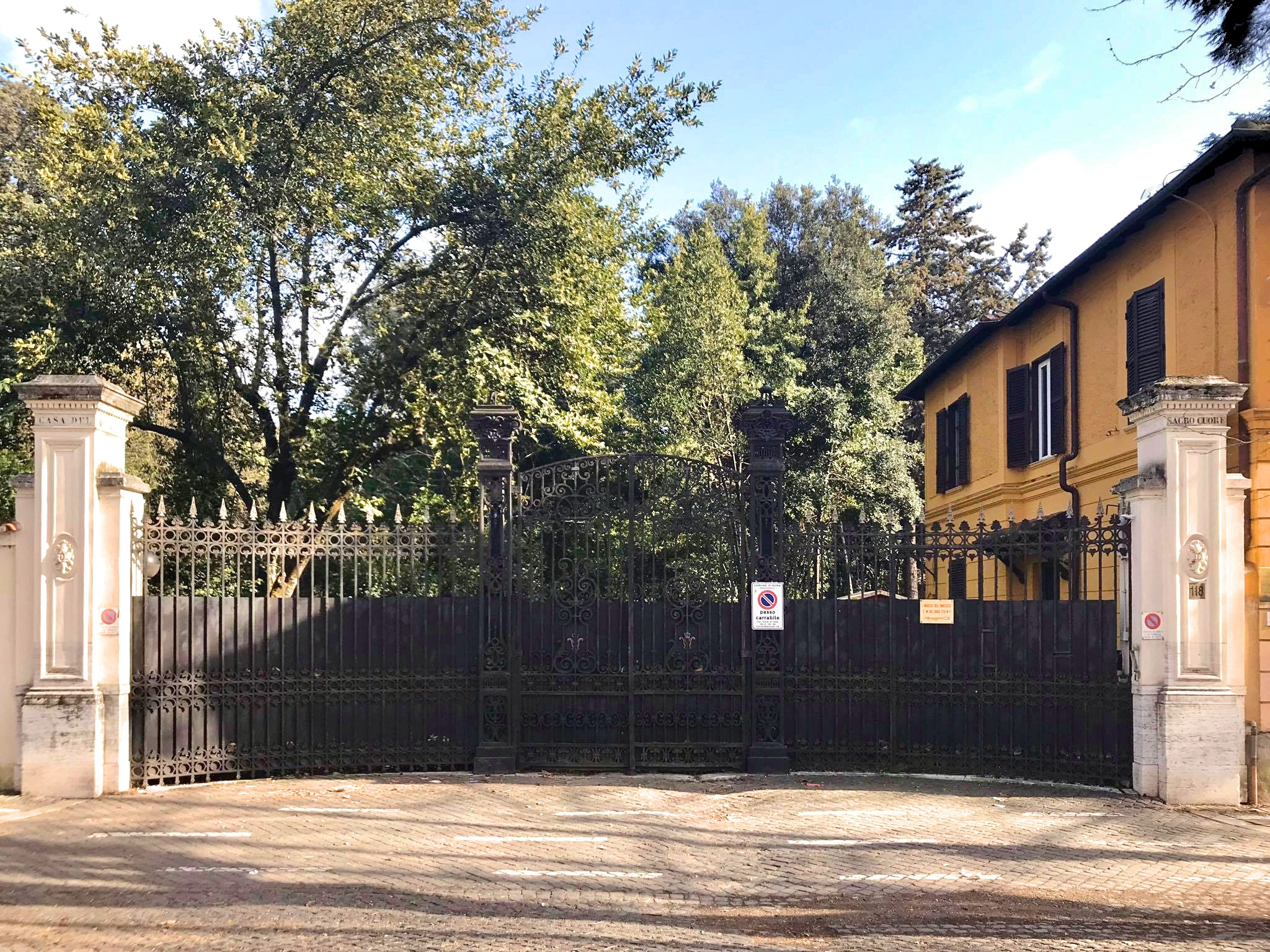
The historic entrance to the villa on Via Nomentana. On the columns on either side of the gate the inscription House of the Sacred Heart can be read

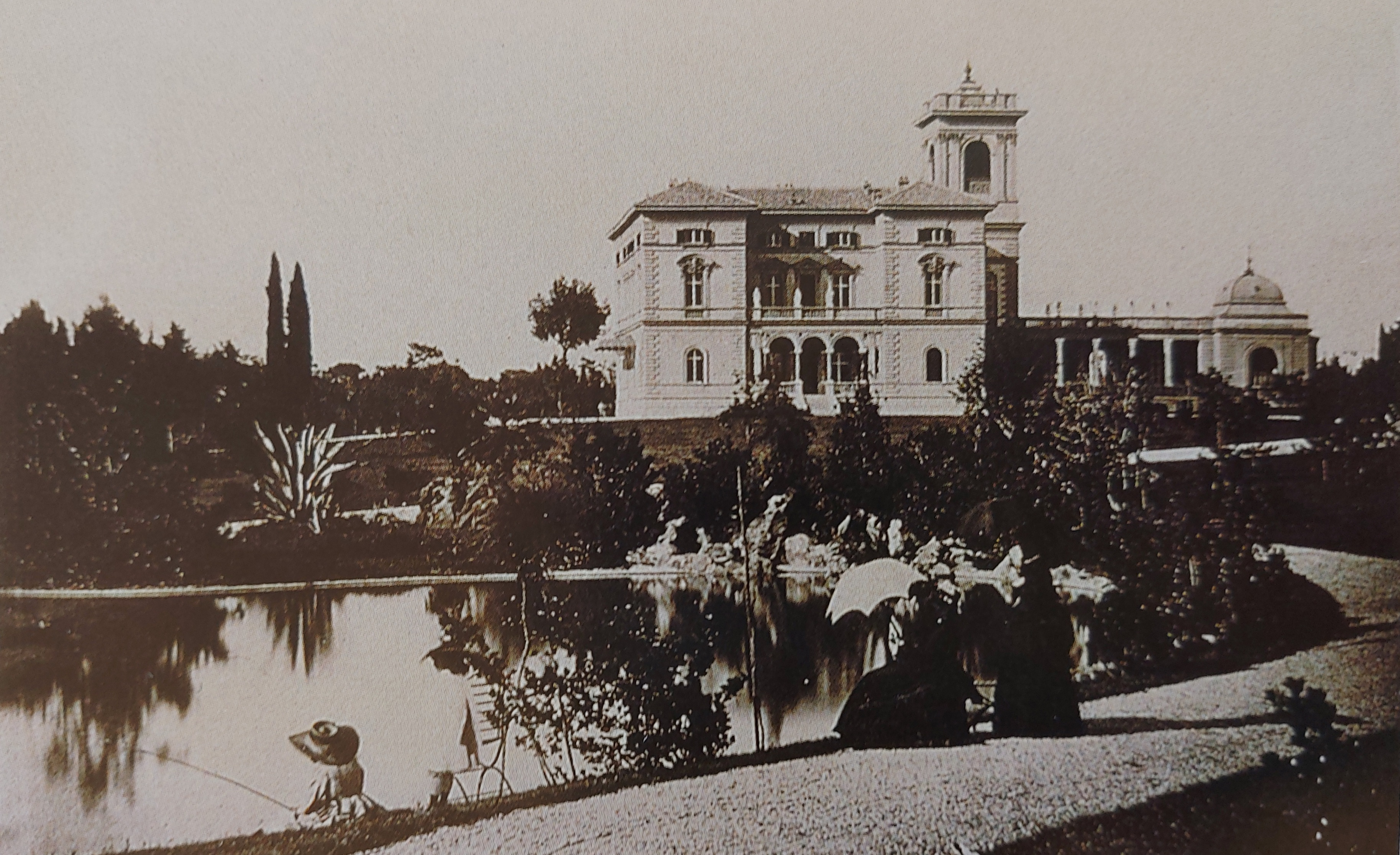
View of the park at the end of the 19th century
