= Listen, Let's Make Love =

- Directed by: Vittorio Caprioli
- Produced by: Alberto Grimaldi
- Starring: Pierre Clémenti; Claudine Auger; Beba Lončar; Tanya Lopert; Juliette Mayniel; Martine Malle; Massimo Girotti; Valentina Cortese; Franca Valeri; Edwige Feuillère
- Cinematography: Pasqualino De Santis
- Edited by: Ruggero Mastroianni
- Music by: Ennio Morricone
- Release date: 20 August 1969
- Country: Italy
- Language: Italian

Scusi, facciamo l'amore? (internationally released as Listen, Let's Make Love) is a 1969 Italian commedia all'italiana written and directed by Vittorio Caprioli.

== Plot ==
Lallo di San Marciano moves from Naples to Milan after the death of his father Bebe. Because the father did not own anything, except a series of elegant dresses, Lallo is welcomed into the home of his uncle Carlo. Lallo begins attending the wealthy friends of his aunt, with whom he starts a series of sexual relations in order to be kept.

== Cast ==
- Pierre Clémenti: Lallo di San Marciano
- Claudine Auger: Ida Bernasconi
- Beba Lončar: Lidia
- Carlo Caprioli: Carlo
- Valentina Cortese: Mrs. di San Marciano
- Massimo Girotti: Tassi
- Franca Valeri: Diraghi
- Edwige Feuillère: Giuditta
- Juliette Mayniel: Gilberta
- Tanya Lopert: Flavia
- Fabienne Fabre: Puccio Picco
- Martine Malle: Sveva
