= Franco Mannino =

Italian composer

- Franco Mannino (1959 photo with dedication)
- Born: 25 April 1924; Palermo, Italy
- Died: 1 February 2005 (aged 80); Rome, Italy
- Occupation: composer
- Known for: 440 compositions
- Notable work: opera Il diavolo in giardino (1963), ballet Mario e il Mago (1956)
- Spouse: Uberta Visconti di Modrone

Franco Mannino (25 April 1924 – 1 February 2005) was an Italian film composer, pianist, opera director, playwright and novelist.

== Biography ==
Mannino was born in Palermo. He was married with Uberta Visconti di Modrone, a sister to the film and stage director Luchino Visconti (see below). He died in Rome in 2005.

== Music career ==
He made his debut as pianist at the age of 16. He conducted the National Arts Centre Orchestra in Canada between 1982 and 1986, among the others.

In all he wrote more than 440 compositions including opera, ballet, oratorios, symphonies, chamber music and music for the theatre. In addition there was his music for more than a hundred films by some of the best-known directors of his day, including Luchino Visconti with whom he collaborated several times, including such films as Death in Venice (conductor) and Ludwig (piano and arrangements for orchestra of music by Richard Wagner: mainly "Porazzi-theme" and excerpts from Tristan and Isolde), Conversation Piece and L'Innocente, both conducting original composed material.

His 1963 opera Il diavolo in giardino, from a libretto by Visconti (and collaborators) based on a Thomas Mann short story, was presented at the Teatro Massimo in Palermo in February. Another of his works, which Visconti directed, was the ballet Mario e il Mago in 1956.

== Selected filmography ==
- Tomorrow Is Another Day (1951)
- At the Edge of the City (1953)
- Morgan, the Pirate (1960)
- The Seventh Sword (1962)
- Gold for the Caesars (1963)
- Death in Venice (1971)
- Ludwig (1972)
- The Driver's Seat (1974)
- Conversation Piece (1974)
- The Innocent (1976)
- A Simple Heart (1977)
- A Man on His Knees (1979)
- Murder Obsession (1981)
