= La governante =

- Directed by: Giovanni Grimaldi
- Written by: Vitaliano Brancati (play); Giovanni Grimaldi
- Starring: Turi Ferro; Martine Brochard
- Cinematography: Gastone Di Giovanni
- Music by: Piero Umiliani
- Release date: 1974
- Language: Italian

La governante (English: The Governess) is a 1974 Italian comedy drama film directed by Giovanni Grimaldi and starring Turi Ferro and Martine Brochard. It is based on a stage play by Vitaliano Brancati.

The film got a great commercial success, grossing over 1.8 billion lire at the Italian box office.

== Plot ==
In Catania, in the house of the Platania family, a young French girl arrives as housekeeper: Caterina Leher. The elderly widower Leopoldo lives in this family unit; his son Enrico, engaged in ex-marital adventures; her daughter-in-law Elena, a wild intellectual who allows herself to be courted with discretion by the bitter writer Alessandro Bonivaglia, a tolerated frequenter of the house; their two little children, all served faithfully by a naive girl: Jana.

Both Caterina and the Platania family are religious, but of a very particular religiosity. Catherine is "the sin" not so much because education and nature have endowed her with anomalous instincts as because these instincts, mixed with a fanatic desire for respectability, overwhelm her in a cog of complacent remorse and distorted mortifications.

This behavior of Caterina suffers damage to Jana, who, following a slander by the housekeeper, is expelled and sent back to her hometown. During this journey she is involved in a train accident which causes her death. Having hired a new maid, Francesca, Leopoldo discovers the woman in intimate relations with Caterina.

Having obtained Leopoldo's forgiveness, learned from him of Jana's tragic death, she attempts suicide, but is saved by the elderly widower who does not forgive herself for having pushed her teenage daughter many years earlier, for excess of intransigence. to take his own life.

== Cast ==
- Turi Ferro: Leopoldo Platania
- Martine Brochard: Catherine
- Paola Quattrini: Elena
- Agostina Belli: Jana
- Pino Caruso: Enrico Platania
- Vittorio Caprioli: Alessandro
- Umberto Spadaro
