= Blue Ribbon Award for Best Foreign Film =

Annual Japanese film award

- Awarded for: Best Performance by a Foreign Film
- Country: Japan
- Presented by: The Association of Tokyo Film Journalists
- First award: 1951

The Blue Ribbon Award for Best Foreign Film is a prize recognizing excellence in Foreign film. It is awarded annually by the Association of Tokyo Film Journalists as one of the Blue Ribbon Awards.

== List of winners ==
No.	Year	Film	Director(s)
1	1950	N/A	N/A
2	1951	Sunset Boulevard	Billy Wilder
3	1952	Monsieur Verdoux	Charles Chaplin
4	1953	Forbidden Games	René Clément
5	1954	The Wages of Fear	Henri-Georges Clouzot
6	1955	East of Eden	Elia Kazan
7	1956	Gervaise	René Clément
8	1957	La Strada	Federico Fellini
9	1958	The Old Man and the Sea	John Sturges; Henry King; Fred Zinnemann
10	1959	12 Angry Men	Sidney Lumet
11	1960	On the Beach	Stanley Kramer
12	1961	Two Women	Vittorio De Sica
13	1962	The Grapes of Wrath	John Ford
14	1963	Sundays and Cybele	Serge Bourguignon
15	1964	Lilies of the Field	Ralph Nelson
16	1965	Mary Poppins	Robert Stevenson
17	1966	A Man and a Woman	Claude Lelouch
18	1975	Lenny	Bob Fosse
19	1976	Taxi Driver	Martin Scorsese
20	1977	Rocky	John G. Avildsen
21	1978	Conversation Piece	Luchino Visconti
22	1979	The Deer Hunter	Michael Cimino
23	1980	Kramer vs. Kramer	Robert Benton
24	1981	The Tin Drum	Volker Schlöndorff
25	1982	E.T. the Extra-Terrestrial	Steven Spielberg
26	1983	Flashdance	Adrian Lyne
27	1984	The Right Stuff	Philip Kaufman
28	1985	Witness	Peter Weir
29	1986	The Color Purple	Steven Spielberg
30	1987	The Untouchables	Brian De Palma
31	1988	Wings of Desire	Wim Wenders
32	1989	Die Hard	John McTiernan
33	1990	Field of Dreams	Phil Alden Robinson
34	1991	The Silence of the Lambs	Jonathan Demme
35	1992	JFK	Oliver Stone
36	1993	Jurassic Park	Steven Spielberg
37	1994	Pulp Fiction	Quentin Tarantino
38	1995	The Bridges of Madison County	Clint Eastwood
39	1996	Seven	David Fincher
40	1997	Titanic	James Cameron
41	1998	L.A. Confidential	Curtis Hanson
42	1999	Life Is Beautiful	Roberto Benigni
43	2000	Dancer in the Dark	Lars von Trier
44	2001	Joint Security Area	Park Chan-wook
45	2002	Shaolin Soccer	Stephen Chow
46	2003	Infernal Affairs	Andrew Lau; Alan Mak
47	2004	Mystic River	Clint Eastwood
48	2005	Million Dollar Baby	Clint Eastwood
49	2006	Flags of Our Fathers	Clint Eastwood
50	2007	Dreamgirls	Bill Condon
51	2008	The Dark Knight	Christopher Nolan
52	2009	Gran Torino	Clint Eastwood
53	2010	District 9	Neill Blomkamp
54	2011	Black Swan	Darren Aronofsky
55	2012	Les Misérables	Tom Hooper
56	2013	Gravity	Alfonso Cuarón
57	2014	Jersey Boys	Clint Eastwood
58	2015	Mad Max: Fury Road	George Miller
59	2016	Rogue One	Gareth Edwards
60	2017	Hidden Figures	Theodore Melfi
61	2018	Bohemian Rhapsody	Bryan Singer
62	2019	Joker	Todd Phillips
63	2020	Parasite	Bong Joon-ho
64	2021	No Time to Die	Cary Joji Fukunaga
65	2022	Top Gun: Maverick	Joseph Kosinski
66	2023	The Super Mario Bros. Movie	Aaron Horvath; Michael Jelenic
67	2024	Oppenheimer	Christopher Nolan
68	2025	Conclave	Edward Berger
