= Paris, My Love =

- Directed by: Vittorio Caprioli
- Written by: Vittorio Caprioli; Renato Mainardi; Silvana Ottieri; Franca Valeri
- Produced by: Tonino Cervi; Alessandro Jacovoni
- Cinematography: Carlo Di Palma
- Edited by: Nino Baragli
- Music by: Fiorenzo Carpi
- Release date: 1962
- Language: Italian

Paris, My Love (Italian: Parigi o cara) is a 1962 Italian comedy drama film co-written and directed by Vittorio Caprioli.

It premiered at the 23rd Venice International Film Festival, and it was later shown as part of a retrospective Questi fantasmi: Cinema italiano ritrovato at the 65th Venice International Film Festival.

== Cast ==
- Franca Valeri as Delia Nesti
- Vittorio Caprioli as Avallone
- Fiorenzo Fiorentini as Claudio Nesti
- Margherita Girelli as Grazia
- Antonio Battistella as Antonio
- Nunzia Fumo as Elvira
- Gigi Reder as Il Portinaio
