= The Innocent (1976 film) =

1976 film by Luchino Visconti

- Original film poster
- Directed by: Luchino Visconti
- Screenplay by: Suso Cecchi d'Amico; Enrico Medioli; Luchino Visconti
- Based on: The Intruder by Gabriele d'Annunzio
- Produced by: Giovanni Bertolucci
- Starring: Giancarlo Giannini; Laura Antonelli; Jennifer O'Neill
- Cinematography: Pasqualino De Santis
- Edited by: Ruggero Mastroianni
- Music by: Franco Mannino
- Production company: Rizzoli Film; Les Films Jacques Leitienne; Francoriz Production
- Distributed by: Cineriz (Italy); Les Films Jacques Leitienne (France)
- Release dates: 15 May 1976 (Cannes); 18 May 1976 (Italy); 15 September 1976 (France)
- Running time: 125 minutes
- Countries: Italy; France
- Language: Italian

The Innocent (Italian: L'innocente) is a 1976 period drama film directed by Luchino Visconti and starring Giancarlo Giannini, Laura Antonelli, and Jennifer O'Neill. It is an adaptation of Gabriele d'Annunzio's 1892 novel The Intruder, about a chauvinist aristocrat who flaunts his mistress to his wife, but when he believes she has been unfaithful, he becomes enamored of her again. It was Visconti's final film, released posthumously, three months after his death in March 1976.

== Plot ==
In the late 1890s, Tullio Hermil is a wealthy Roman aristocrat. He has a possessive aristocratic mistress, Teresa Raffo, and neglects his wife, Giuliana. His interest in his wife is rekindled when he sees Giuliana's happiness after she has begun a love affair with a novelist, Filippo d'Arborio. She becomes pregnant by d'Arborio. Tullio urges an abortion but she refuses; d'Arborio then dies of complications from malaria.

Tullio cannot tolerate the healthy male child delivered to Giuliana, although he tries. While the family are at Christmas mass he exposes the baby and the child dies, apparently of natural causes. Giuliana, who knows Tullio has murdered the baby, leaves him.

Tullio attempts to rekindle his affair with Teresa and takes her to his town house where they attempt to make love. When she tells him she no longer loves him, he shoots himself. Shocked, Teresa picks up her belongings and leaves the estate.

== Cast ==
- Giancarlo Giannini as Tullio Hermil
- Laura Antonelli as Giuliana Hermil
- Jennifer O'Neill as Teresa Raffo
- Rina Morelli as Marchesa Marianna Hermil
- Didier Haudepin as Federico Hermil
- Marc Porel as Filippo d'Arborio
- Massimo Girotti as Count Stefano Egano
- Marie Dubois as The Princess
- Roberta Paladini as Miss Elviretta
- Claude Mann as The Prince
- Siria Betti as Virginia
- Alessandra Vazzoler as Nana
- Marina Pierro as Maria
- Vittorio Zarfati as Dr. Milani
- Enzo Musumeci Greco as Fencing Master

== Production ==
Visconti originally wanted Alain Delon and Romy Schneider for the lead roles. But Schneider was unavailable, and Delon was uncomfortable with the idea of working with Visconti in what he considered to be a diminished state, post-stroke. Also considered for a role was Charlotte Rampling, who said Visconti wrote the screenplay with her in mind, but she was unable to do the movie because she was filming Foxtrot.

The Italian-French co-production was filmed at Villa Mirafiori in Rome, the Villa Butori in Lucca, and the Villa Bellosguardo nearby.

== Reception ==
The film was entered into the 1976 Cannes Film Festival. It was released in Italy by Cineriz on 18 May 1976, and in France on September 15. In the United States, the film was distributed by Analysis Film Corporation in 1979.

=== Critical response ===
The film holds a 75% positive review score on Rotten Tomatoes, based on 20 reviews.

Vincent Canby of The New York Times gave the film a positive review, writing "Visconti's last film (completed in 1976 shortly before his death) and among the most beautiful and severely disciplined films he has ever made."

Jonathan Rosenbaum of the Chicago Reader wrote "Visconti's last film strikes me as arguably the greatest of his late works apart from The Leopard -- a withering autocritique of masculine vanity and self-delusion."

Tony Rayns of Time Out wrote "The film resolves itself into an almost painfully sincere meditation on masculine self-delusion. It has a great performance from Laura Antonelli as the wife, and excellent ones from Giannini and Jennifer O'Neill as husband and lover."

=== Awards and nominations ===
- David di Donatello for Best Score - Franco Mannino
- Turkish Film Critics Association (SIYAD) Awards - Best Foreign Film (2nd Place)

== See also ==
- List of Italian films of 1976
