= Franca Valeri =

Italian actress (1920–2020)

Franca Valeri OMRI
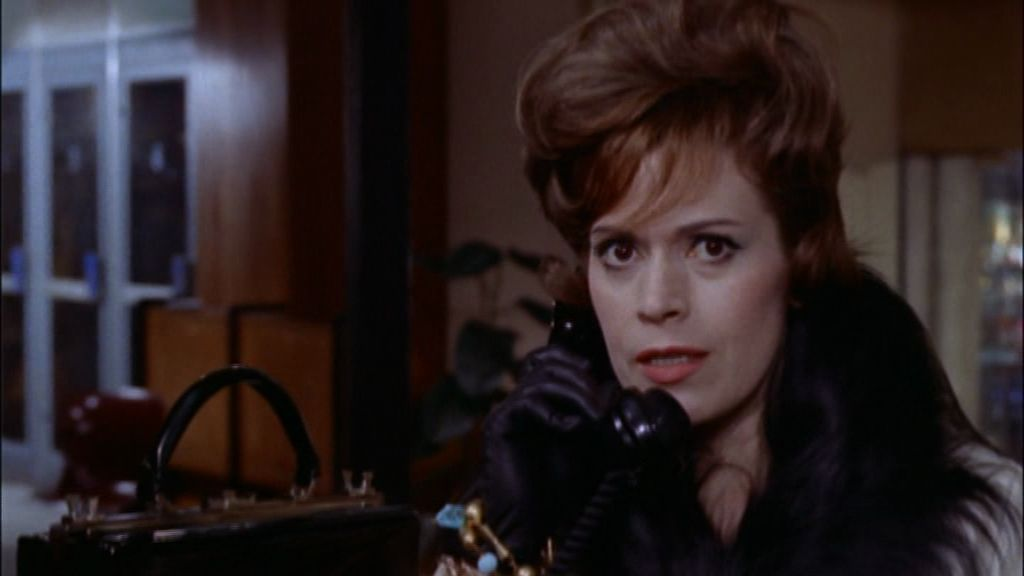
- Valeri in the film Paris, My Love (1962)
- Born: Alma Franca Maria Norsa; 31 July 1920; Milan, Kingdom of Italy
- Died: 9 August 2020 (aged 100); Rome, Italy
- Occupation: Actress
- Years active: 1949–2014
- Spouse: Vittorio Caprioli (m. 1960; div. 1974)
- Partner: Maurizio Rinaldi (1985–1995)
- Children: Stefania Bonfadelli (adopted)

Alma Franca Maria Norsa OMRI (31 July 1920 – 9 August 2020), known professionally as Franca Valeri, was an Italian actress, author, and screenwriter.

== Life and career ==
Born in Milan as Alma Franca Maria Norsa. Her Jewish father and brother were able to flee to Switzerland. As her father did not want her to become an actress, Norsa adopted the stage name Valeri in the 1950s as suggested by a friend of hers who was reading a book by French critic and poet Paul Valéry.

Valeri started her career on stage in 1947, and in 1949 she co-founded the Teatro dei Gobbi, along with Luciano Salce and her future husband Vittorio Caprioli. On the radio, she created and played the characters of La signorina Snob (Mrs. Snob), Cesira la manicure and Sora Cecioni. She co-starred in such films as A Hero of Our Times (1955), The Sign of Venus (of which she co-wrote both the story and the screenplay), and Il vedovo, as well as others. She often wrote her scenes in the films in which she appeared.

Among the major films she co-wrote, Paris, My Love (1962) is a rare case where the story is focused on her role only. In the 1960s, 1970s and 1980s, she frequently worked for the Italian television. She starred in Studio Uno, Le divine and Sabato Sera. In the 1980s and early 1990s, she starred in a series of commercials for Pandoro Melegatti, which were well received and stretched over a number of years (Pandoro being a seasonal product tied to the Christmas holidays).

During the 2005–06 theatrical season, she performed her own monologue, La Vedova di Socrate ("Socrate's Widow"), and Les Bonnes, by Jean Genet. In January 2008 she played the role of Solange in Les Bonnes at Milan's Piccolo Teatro. On 8 May 2020, Valeri received an Honorary David di Donatello Award.

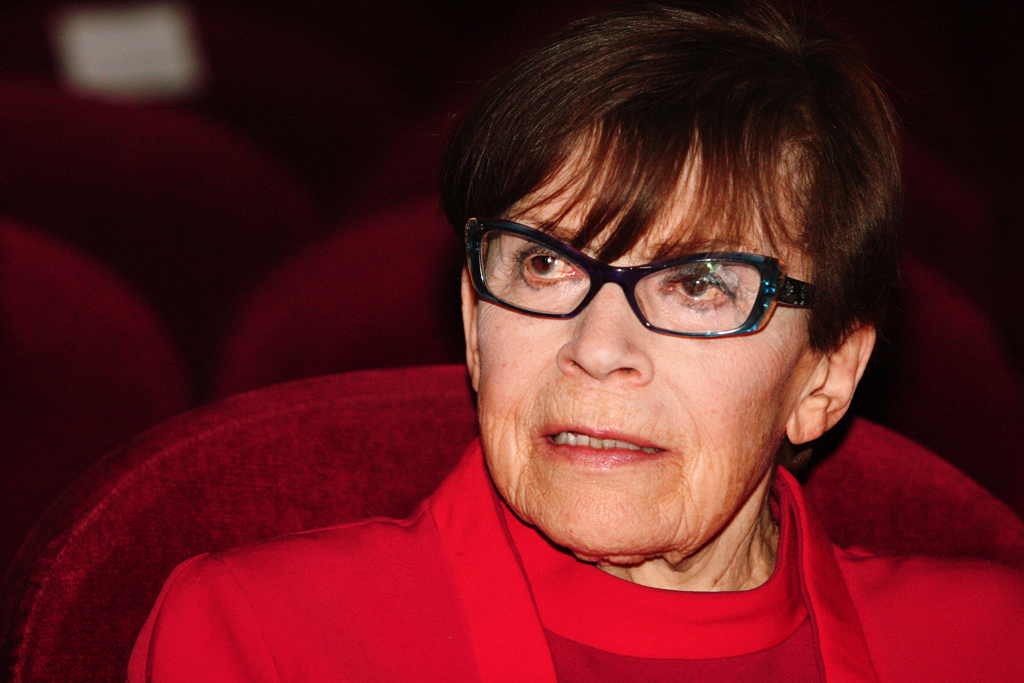
Valeri in 2011

Valeri died on 9 August 2020, nine days after turning 100.

== Filmography ==
=== Actress ===
==== Cinema ====
- Variety Lights (1951) – Mitzy, Hungarian designer
- The Two Sergeants (1951)
- Toto in Color (1952) – Giulia Sofia
- Solo per te Lucia (1952)
- It Happened in the Park (1953) – Elvira (segment Concorso di bellezza)
- Questi fantasmi (1954)
- Le signorine dello 04 (1955) – Carla, shift manager
- The Sign of Venus (1955) – Cesira
- The Letters Page (1955) – Lady Eva
- The Bigamist (1956) – Isolina Fornaciari
- A Hero of Our Times (1957) – De Ritis' widow
- Husbands in the City (1957) – Olivetti
- The Love Specialist (1958) – countess Bernardi
- Non perdiamo la testa (1959) – Beatrice
- Il moralista (1959) – Virginia
- You're on Your Own (1959) – Marisa 'Siberia'
- Il vedovo (1959) - Elvira Almiraghi
- Rocco and His Brothers (1960) – widow (uncredited)
- Mariti in pericolo (1960) – Gina
- Crimen (1960) – Giovanna Filonzi
- Leoni al sole (1961) – Giulia
- I motorizzati (1962) – Velia
- Paris, My Love (1962) – Delia Nesti
- Le motorizzate (1963)
- The Shortest Day (1963)
- Gli onorevoli (1963) – Bianca Sereni
- I cuori infranti (1963) – Fatma Angioj (segment La manina di Fatma)
- I maniaci (1964) – wife (segment Il pezzo antico)
- Me, Me, Me... and the Others (1966) – journalist
- La ragazza del bersagliere (1967) – Bice Marinetti
- Listen, Let's Make Love (1968) – Diraghi
- Basta guardarla (1970) – Pola Prima
- Nel giorno del Signore (1970) – Anticoli's widow
- Hector the Mighty (1972) – Cassandra
- The Last Italian Tango (1974) – (playing the role of a) film director
- Poker in Bed (1974) – Giulia Nascimbeni
- L'Italia s'è rotta (1976)
- Come ti rapisco il pupo (1976) – Dada
- La Bidonata (1977) – Giovanna Bronchi
- Grazie tante – Arrivederci (1977) – lady on the bus
- Tanto va la gatta al lardo... (1978) – Maria
- It's Not Me, It's Him (1980) – Carla Weiss
- Love in First Class (1980) – Mrs. Della Rosa
- I Don't Understand You Anymore (1980) – Maritza
- Paulo Roberto Cotechiño centravanti di sfondamento (1983) – countess
- Tosca e le altre due (2003) – Emilia
- Alberto il grande (2013) – Herself

==== Television ====
- La cantatrice calva, directed by José Quaglio (1967)
- Felicita Colombo, directed by Antonello Falqui (1968) - TV series
- Le donne balorde, written and played by Valeri, directed by Giacomo Colli (1970) - TV series
- Sì, vendetta..., directed by Mario Ferrero (1974) - TV series
- Nel mondo di Alice, directed by Guido Stagnaro (1974) - TV series
- Le avventure della villeggiatura, directed by Mario Missiroli (1974)
- Il barone e il servitore, directed by Davide Montemurri (1978) - TV series
- La strana coppia, stage direction by Valeri; television direction by Roberto Russo (1989) - play and TV series
- Papà prende moglie, directed by Nini Salerno (1993) - TV series
- Norma e Felice, directed by Giorgio Vignali (1995) - TV series
- Caro maestro, directed by Rossella Izzo (1996-1997) - TV series
- Come quando fuori piove, directed by Mario Monicelli (2000) - TV series
- Linda e il brigadiere, directed by Gianfrancesco Lazotti and Alberto Simone (2000) - TV series
- Non tutto è risolto - television film (2014)

=== Screenwriter ===
- The Sign of Venus, directed by Dino Risi (1955)
- Leoni al sole, directed by Vittorio Caprioli (1961)
- Paris, My Love, directed by Vittorio Caprioli (1962)
- Listen, Let's Make Love, directed by Vittorio Caprioli (1967)
- Sì, vendetta..., directed by Mario Ferrero (1974) - TV series
- Tosca e altre due, directed by Giorgio Ferrara (2003)

== Books ==
- Il diario della signorina Snob. Colette Rosselli (illustration). Milano. 1951.
  - Il diario della signorina Snob. Colette Rosselli (illustration). Lindau. 2003. ISBN 978-88-718-0474-3.
- Le donne. Milano. 1960.
  - Valeri, Franca (2012). Le donne. Torino. ISBN 978-88-062-1192-9.
- Le catacombe. Tre atti. Bologna. 1963.
- Questa qui, quello là. Milano. 1965.
- Valeri, Franca (1992). Toh, quante donne!. Milano. ISBN 978-88-043-6283-8.
  - Valeri, Franca (2004). Toh, quante donne!. Torino. ISBN 978-88-718-0513-9.
- Patrizia Zappa Mulas, ed. (2003). Tragedie da ridere. Dalla signorina Snob alla vedova Socrate. Milano. ISBN 978-88-773-8381-5.
- Valeri, Franca (2005). Animali e altri attori. Storie di cani, gatti e altri personaggi. Roma. ISBN 978-88-745-2063-3.
- Patrizia Zappa Mulas, ed. (2009). Di tanti palpiti. Divertimenti musicali. Milano. ISBN 978-88-773-8462-1.
- Valeri, Franca (2010). Bugiarda no, reticente. Torino. ISBN 978-88-062-0640-6.
- Valeri, Franca (2011). Non tutto è risolto. Torino. ISBN 978-88-062-0645-1.
- Franca Valeri; Luciana Littizzetto (2011). L'educazione delle fanciulle. Dialogo tra due signorine perbene. Torino. ISBN 978-88-062-0943-8.
- Valeri, Franca (2014). Il cambio dei cavalli. Torino. ISBN 978-88-062-2050-1.
- Valeri, Franca (2016). La vacanza dei superstiti (e la chiamano vecchiaia). Torino. ISBN 978-88-062-3008-1.
- Valeri, Franca (2017). La stanza dei gatti. Una chiacchierata con il teatro. Torino. ISBN 978-88-062-3612-0.
- Valeri, Franca (2019). Il secolo della noia. Torino. ISBN 978-88-062-4209-1.
- Tutte le commedie. Lella Costa (preface). Milano. 2020. ISBN 978-88-948-1430-9.
- Valeri, Franca (2020). La Ferrarina. Taverna. Torino. ISBN 978-88-062-4699-0.
