= Simona (film) =

- Directed by: Patrick Longchamps
- Written by: Georges Bataille (novel); Patrick Longchamps
- Produced by: Bruno Dreossi; Roland Perault
- Starring: Laura Antonelli; Maurizio Degli Esposti; Raf Vallone
- Cinematography: Luigi Bernardini; Aiace Parolin
- Edited by: Franco Arcalli; Panos Papakyriakopoulos
- Music by: Fiorenzo Carpi
- Production companies: Les Films de l'Oeil; Rolfilm Produzione
- Distributed by: Warner Bros. (Italy)
- Release date: 22 February 1974
- Running time: 91 minutes
- Country: Italy
- Language: Italian

Simona is a 1974 Italian erotic drama film directed by Patrick Longchamps and starring Laura Antonelli, Maurizio Degli Esposti and Raf Vallone.

== Cast ==
- Laura Antonelli as Simona
- Maurizio Degli Esposti as Georges
- Raf Vallone as L'oncle de Marcelle / Marcelle's uncle
- Yvette Merlin as La mère de Simone / Simone's mother
- Marc Audier
- Ramon Berry
- Michel Lechat
- Patrick Magee as Le père
- Margot Margaret as La marquise Marcelle de la Paille
- Jo Maxane as Marcelle's mother
- Quentin Milo as Gille
- Germaine Pascal
- John Trigger as foreigner
- Gerald Semaforo
