= I cuori infranti =

1963 Italian comedy film

- Film poster
- Directed by: Vittorio Caprioli; Gianni Puccini
- Written by: Vittorio Caprioli; Sandro Continenza
- Produced by: Renato Angiolini; Renato Jaboni
- Starring: Norma Bengell
- Cinematography: Alfio Contini; Marcello Gatti
- Edited by: Nino Baragli
- Music by: Fiorenzo Carpi
- Release date: 1963
- Running time: 95 minutes
- Country: Italy
- Language: Italian

I cuori infranti (transl. The Broken Hearts) is a 1963 Italian comedy film directed by Vittorio Caprioli and Gianni Puccini. It was shown as part of a retrospective on Italian comedy at the 67th Venice International Film Festival.

== Cast ==
=== Segment E vissero felici ===
- Norma Bengell as Milena
- Gianni Bonagura as Un bagnante
- Sandro Bruni
- Nino Manfredi as Quirino
- Roberto Paoletti as L'ex commilitone di Quirino
- Ilya Lopez as faithless wife of Quirino's commilitone

=== Segment La manina di Fatma ===
- Tino Buazzelli as Gustavo Von Tellen
- Vittorio Caprioli as Un passante
- Aldo Giuffrè as Carlo De Tomasi
- Dany París as La ragazza del tiro a segno
- Paola Quattrini as Lisa Von Tellen
- Linda Sini as Baronessa Von Tellen
- Franca Valeri as Fatma Angioj
