= Renato Angiolini =

Italian composer

Renato Angiolini (9 November 1923, in Gallarate – 3 February 1985, in Milan) was an Italian songwriter and pianist.

He is best known as the composer for songs by Tony Renis, Massimo Ranieri, I Giganti, and Lucio Battisti.

His song Le Colline Sono In Fiore was released on 18 November 1965 as The River by Ken Dodd accompanied by Geoff Love and his Orchestra. Dodd's version of the song, with lyrics by Mort Shuman, reached number 3 in the UK singles chart soon after it was released.

Many of his works are uncredited and therefore largely untraceable. However, he was frequently credited as Toang, which is a name derived from the last two letters of his first name and the first three of his last name.

Angiolini produced or co-produced a number of films, starting with the 1963 Italian comedy film I cuori infranti, which he co-produced with Renato Jaboni.

== Filmography ==
I cuori infranti (1963)
Amore facile (1964)
Una ragazza tutta d'oro (1967)
I ragazzi di Bandiera Gialla (1968)
My Name Is Shanghai Joe (1973)
Calling All Police Cars (1975)
Milano violenta (1976)

== Partial discography ==
=== Albums ===
1973: Evviva il liscio (Derby, DBR 53335)
1984: Il grande liscio (CGD, 20419)
