= Margarete von Bayern =

German abbess

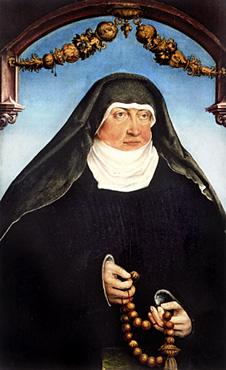
Portrait of Abbess Margarete von Bayern by unknown artist.

Margarete von Bayern (1480–1531) was a German abbess who was the daughter of George, Duke of Bavaria.

She served as the abbess of Benediktinerinnenkloster in Neuburg an der Donau from 1509 to 1521.
