= Splendori e miserie di Madame Royale =

- Directed by: Vittorio Caprioli
- Starring: Ugo Tognazzi; Vittorio Caprioli; Jenny Tamburi; Maurizio Bonuglia
- Cinematography: Giuseppe Rotunno
- Edited by: Ruggero Mastroianni
- Music by: Fiorenzo Carpi
- Release date: 1970
- Country: Italy
- Language: Italian

Splendori e miserie di Madame Royale (also known as Madame Royale) is a 1970 Italian comedy drama film directed by Vittorio Caprioli.

== Plot ==
Alessio, a homosexual ex-dancer and now framer, has raised the young Mimmina as a daughter, abandoned by her father at an early age. Despite the commitment to make the girl an honest woman in her own way, Mimmina reveals a complete moral ruthlessness that leads her to prison for an attempted abortion, at the time still illegal. In the hope of somehow benefiting the young woman, whom he is sincerely fond of, Alessio is forced to accept the proposal of an ambiguous commissioner and becomes a police informer. Thanks to his confidences, the police manage to thwart drug trafficking, fake paintings and pornographic photos, but Alessio is soon abandoned by all the friends who have discovered his activity as an informer. Decided to move to another city, Alessio falls victim of the revenge of the underworld on the eve of his departure.

== Cast ==
- Ugo Tognazzi as Alessio/Madame Royale
- Vittorio Caprioli as Bambola di Pekino
- Jenny Tamburi as Mimmina
- Maurice Ronet as Commissioner
- Maurizio Bonuglia as Pino Rinotti
- Simonetta Stefanelli as the prisoner
