= Vittorio Caprioli =

Italian actor (1921–1989)

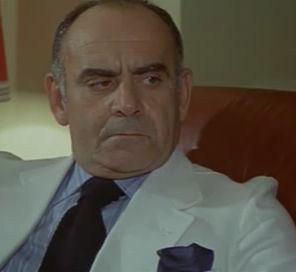
- Caprioli in La governante (1974)
- Born: 15 August 1921; Naples, Kingdom of Italy
- Died: 2 October 1989 (aged 68); Naples, Italy
- Occupations: Actor; film director; screenwriter
- Years active: 1942–1989
- Spouse: Franca Valeri (m. 1960; div. 1974)

Vittorio Caprioli (15 August 1921 – 2 October 1989) was an Italian actor, film director and screenwriter. He appeared in 109 films between 1946 and 1990, mostly in French productions.

== Biography ==
Caprioli was born in Naples. Having graduated from the Accademia Nazionale di Arte Drammatica Silvio D'Amico in Rome, he made his stage debut in 1942 in the Carli-Racca company. From 1945, he began his collaboration with the Italian public broadcaster, RAI, often together with Luciano Salce, creating magazine and variety programs. Arriving in 1948 at the Piccolo theatre in Milan, where under the direction of Giorgio Strehler he took part in William Shakespeare's The Tempest. At the beginning of 1950, he was cast alongside Alberto Bonucci and Gianni Cajafa for the Neapolitan Carosello musical theatrical work, directed by Ettore Giannini.

A versatile performer, in 1950 he founded, with Bonucci and Franca Valeri the Teatro dei Gobbi, which proposed a subtly satirical type of show. In 1960, he married Valeri with whom he presented plays. They divorced in 1974.

He appeared in cinema as a character actor and made his directorial debut in 1961 with Lions In the Sun, which was later selected to enter the list of the 100 Italian films to be saved.

He followed this with Paris, My Love and then a segment of I cuori infranti which was shown as part of a retrospective on Italian comedy at the 67th Venice International Film Festival. The Splendors and Miseries of Madame Royale in 1970 was generally considered to be his best film.

He continued to appear on stage in between his films and was occasionally tempted by television, where he began his career in 1959, but he never really loved the small screen ("I suffer more than anything because of the absence of the public, which I consider an integral and irreplaceable part of the show in which I participate"). In the 1960s, he acted in Village Wooing, directed by Antonello Falqui, and in 1972 he let himself be tempted by a television variety show, which he wrote and performed, Una Serata con Vittorio Caprioli.

In his last years he returned to theater performing, among others, Don Marzio in Carlo Goldoni's La bottega del caffè, The Sunshine Boys by Neil Simon paired with Mario Carotenuto, and Capocomico in Luigi Pirandello's Six Characters in Search of an Author. During the rehearsals of a interpretation of Napoli milionaria, he died suddenly at the age of 68, in a room of one of the famous hotels on the promenade of Naples, struck down by a heart attack.

== Selected filmography ==
- O sole mio (1946)
- Manù il contrabbandiere (1948)
- Variety Lights (1950)
- Atoll K (1951)
- Paris Is Always Paris (1951, uncredited)
- Husband and Wife (1952)
- Toto in Color (1952)
- In Olden Days (1952)
- Eager to Live (1953)
- Aida (1953, uncredited)
- It Happened in the Park (1953)
- A Slice of Life (1954)
- Neapolitan Carousel (1954)
- Buonanotte... avvocato! (1955)
- The Law (1959)
- General Della Rovere (1959)
- You're on Your Own (1959)
- Recours en grâce (1960) - Sergio
- Zazie dans le Métro (1960)
- Behind Closed Doors (1961)
- Leoni al sole (1961, director)
- Adieu Philippine (1962)
- His Days Are Numbered (1962)
- Paris, My Love (1962, director)
- I cuori infranti (1963)
- I maniaci (1964)
- White Voices (1964) - Matteuccio
- La donna è una cosa meravigliosa (1964)
- Amore facile (1964)
- The Myth (1965)
- Me, Me, Me... and the Others (1966)
- A Maiden for a Prince (1966)
- Ischia operazione amore (1966)
- Adultery Italian Style (1966)
- How I Learned to Love Women (1966)
- Insurance on a Virgin (1967)
- La ragazza del bersagliere (1967)
- Death on the Run (1967)
- Anyone Can Play (1967)
- Il marito è mio e l'ammazzo quando mi pare (1968)
- The Libertine (1968)
- Le Mans, Shortcut to Hell (1970, uncredited)
- Nel giorno del signore (1970)
- Splendori e miserie di Madame Royale (1970, director)
- Er Più – storia d'amore e di coltello (1971)
- When Men Carried Clubs and Women Played Ding-Dong (1971)
- Roma Bene (1971)
- Trastevere (1971)
- Hector the Mighty (1972)
- Tout Va Bien (1972)
- When Women Were Called Virgins (1972)
- Poppea: A Prostitute in Service of the Emperor (1972)
- Anche se volessi lavorare, che faccio? (1972)
- The Infamous Column (1973)
- Il Boss (1973)
- A Full Day's Work (1973)
- Giovannona Long-Thigh (1973)
- Io e lui (1973)
- The Sensual Man (1973)
- Le Magnifique (1973)
- Società a responsabilità molto limitata (1973)
- La governante (1974)
- Innocence and Desire (1974)
- Shoot First, Die Later (1974)
- I'm Losing My Temper (1974)
- Erotomania (1974)
- Di mamma non ce n'è una sola (1974)
- Le Magnifique (1975)
- L'ammazzatina (1975)
- The School Teacher (1975)
- Kidnap Syndicate (1975)
- The Messiah (1975)
- Catherine & Co. (1975)
- I baroni (1975)
- As of Tomorrow (1976)
- Le trouble-fesses (1976)
- The Wing or the Thigh (1976)
- Mister Scarface (1976)
- Maschio latino cercasi (1977)
- La Bidonata (1977)
- Messalina, Messalina (1977)
- La presidentessa (1977)
- Grazie tante - Arrivederci (1977)
- Blood and Diamonds (1978)
- Being Twenty (1978)
- C'est dingue... mais on y va (1979)
- Hypochondriac (1979)
- L'affittacamere (1979)
- Café Express (1980)
- The Umbrella Coup (1980)
- Tragedy of a Ridiculous Man (1981)
- Prima che sia troppo presto (1981)
- Le rose et le blanc (1982)
- Più bello di così si muore (1982)
- Stangata napoletana (1983, uncredited)
- Petomaniac (1983)
- Cinderella '80 (1984)
- A Proper Scandal (1984)
- Capriccio (1987)
- Roba da ricchi (1987)
- The Rogues (1987)
- La posta in gioco (1988)
- Tutta colpa della SIP (1988)
- L'ultima scena (1988)
- Una botta di vita (1988)
- Dark Illness (1990)
