= Miracle Child =

Miracle Child may refer to:

- Miracle Child (film), a 1993 American television film
- Miracle child (infant), a baby born before 37 weeks of gestation
- Miracle child (master), someone who at an early age masters one or more skills at an adult level
- Miracle child (pretender) (1820–1883), Duke of Bordeaux
- Miracle child (saint) (1966–1967), Argentine folk saint
- "Miracle Child" (song), a 2023 song by Brandon Lake
- "Miracle Child", a progressive rock song by Uriah Heep from Raging Silence (1989)
- The Miracle Child, a 1932 French science fiction film
- The Miracle Child: He Giveth and Taketh, a 1922 American Western film
- Blessed Boys, a 2021 film also known as The Miracle Child

== See also ==
- The Miracle Kid
