= Lou Castel =

Colombian-Swedish actor (born 1943)

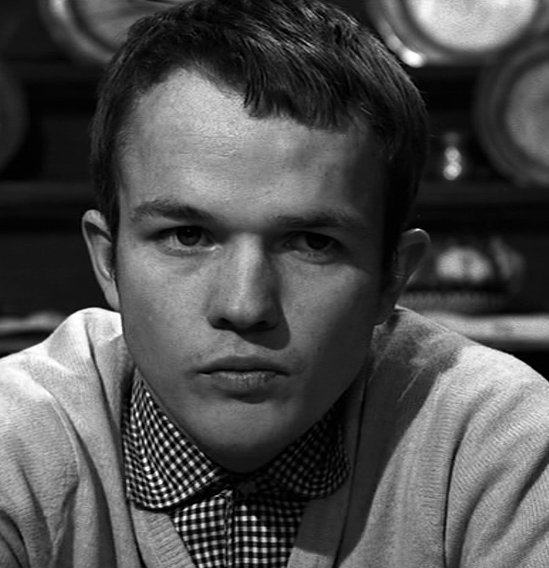
- Castel in Fists in the Pocket (1965)
- Born: Ulv Quarzell; 28 May 1943 (age 83); Bogotá, Colombia
- Occupation: Actor
- Years active: 1963–present

Lou Castel (born Ulv Quarzell; 28 May 1943) is a Swedish actor and political activist, known for his work in Italian cinema. He had his breakthrough role in Marco Bellocchio's Fists in the Pocket (1965), which was followed by several Spaghetti Westerns, in particular Carlo Lizzani's Requiescant (1967) and Damiano Damiani's A Bullet for the General (1967), and the drama Come Play with Me (1968).

Castel's career in Italy was disrupted in the early 1970s by his far-left activism, eventually relocating to France, where he continued to appear in films and on television.

== Early years ==
The son of a Swedish father and an Irish mother, Castel was born Ulv Quarzell in Bogotá, Colombia, where his father was working as a diplomat. He and his twin brother grew up in Cartagena.

When Castel was 6, his parents separated. He followed his mother to Europe and went to school in London, very briefly at Dartington Hall School with his sister Solveig, then in Stockholm. He subsequently went to live in Rome where his mother was working in the local film industry. A communist, Castel's mother also introduced her son to politics.

Interested in acting from an early age, he attended the Centro Sperimentale di Cinematografia, but was quickly kicked out.

== Career ==
His first movie role was as an uncredited extra in The Leopard (1963). Two years later, he gained international fame for his performance in Fists in the Pocket, in which he played the epileptic Alessandro, who murders his mother and his brother. His career in Italy included arthouse pictures, but also Spaghetti Westerns and also softcore erotica. He enjoyed particular success with his starring roles in Damiano Damiani's A Bullet for the General (1967), Salvatore Samperi's Come Play with Me (1968) and Umberto Lenzi's Orgasmo (1969). He later played Jeff, the temperamental bisexual film director in the German production Beware of a Holy Whore (1971), directed by Rainer Werner Fassbinder.

Castel in 2026 attending the presentation of The Fortunate Isles at the 71st Valladolid International Film Festival

While living in Italy, Castel became involved in a Maoist organization, the Union of Italian Communists (Marxist–Leninist). As Italy was going through the Years of Lead period, he was eventually considered an undesirable alien. In 1972, he was deported to Sweden where he no longer had any acquaintances. For a time, he had to rely on subsidies sent to him from Italy by his organization. However, he quickly bounced back and appeared, mostly as a character actor, in various German and French films, directed by filmmakers such as Wim Wenders and Claude Chabrol.

Castel settled in France in the early 1990s. Though the quality of the films he acted in were quite disparate, ranging from arthouse films to cheap exploitation, Castel had a preference for roles that reflected his extreme leftist beliefs. He portrayed left-wing terrorists in Nada (1974), The Cassandra Crossing (1976), Could It Happen Here? (1977) and Year of the Gun (1991).

== Personal life ==
Castel has a son, actor Rocco Quarzell (b. 1974), from the actress Marcella Michelangeli.

A polyglot, Castel speaks a number of languages but jokes that he has no real natural mother tongue and speaks every language with an accent, except for Swedish which he no longer has opportunities to use.

== Selected filmography ==
Year	Title	Role	Director	Notes
1963	The Leopard	Party Guest	Luchino Visconti	Uncredited
1965	Fists in the Pocket	Alessandro	Marco Bellocchio	
1966	Francesco di Assisi	Francis of Assisi	Liliana Cavani	TV film
1967	A Bullet for the General	Bill 'Niño' Tate	Damiano Damiani	
1967	Requiescant	Requiescant	Carlo Lizzani	
1968	The Protagonists	Taddeu	Marcello Fondato	
1968	Come Play with Me	Alvise	Salvatore Samperi	
1968	Galileo	Friar, Young monk of the Vatican	Liliana Cavani	
1968	Lucrezia	Cesare Borgia	Osvaldo Civirani	
1968	La prova generale		Romano Scavolini	
1969	Orgasmo	Peter Donovan	Umberto Lenzi	
1970	Con quale amore, con quanto amore	Ernesto	Pasquale Festa Campanile	
1970	Bocche cucite	Carmelo La Manna	Pino Tosini	
1970	Matalo!	Ray	Cesare Canevari	
1971	Beware of a Holy Whore	Jeff, the director	Rainer Werner Fassbinder	
1972	Nel nome del padre	Salvatore	Marco Bellocchio	
1972	Who Killed the Prosecutor and Why?	Carlo	Giuseppe Vari	
1973	The Scarlet Letter	Rev. Dimmesdale	Wim Wenders	
1974	Nada	D'Arey	Claude Chabrol	
1974	Gangsterfilmen	Simon	Lars G. Thelestam	
1974	Output	Gorski	Michael Fengler	
1975	Faccia di spia	The torturer	Giuseppe Ferrara	
1976	Pure as a Lily	Luciano	Franco Rossi	
1976	The Cassandra Crossing	Swedish terrorist	George P. Cosmatos	
1976	Caro Michele	Osvaldo	Mario Monicelli	
1977	Change of Sex	Durán	Vicente Aranda	
1977	Pigs Have Wings	Marcello	Paolo Pietrangeli	
1977	The American Friend	Rodolphe	Wim Wenders	
1977	Closet Children	Nicola	Benoît Jacquot	
1977	Could It Happen Here?	Marco	Massimo Pirri	
1977	Mr. Mean	Huberto	Fred Williamson	
1978	Violanta	Silver	Daniel Schmid	
1978	Flesh Color	Psychiatrist	François Weyergans	
1978	Killer Nun	Peter	Giulio Berruti	
1980	Ombre	Renato	Giorgio Cavedon	
1982	The Eyes, the Mouth	Giovanni Pallidissimi / Pippo Pallidissimi	Marco Bellocchio	
1984	Trauma	Lemaitre	Gabi Kubach	
1984	Love Is the Beginning of All Terror	Traugott	Helke Sander	
1985	Treasure Island	Doctor / Father	Raúl Ruiz	
1986	Fraulein	André	Michael Haneke	TV film
1986	Hôtel du Paradis	Tramp	Jana Boková	
1986	Nanou	Italian activist	Conny Templeman	
1987	Man on Fire	Violente	Élie Chouraqui	
1987	Rorret	Joseph Rorret	Fulvio Wetzl	
1989	What Time Is It?	Fisherman	Ettore Scola	
1990	Flight from Paradise	Oleg	Ettore Pasculli	
1991	Fuga da Kayenta	McDonaldson	Fabrizio De Angelis	
1991	Year of the Gun	Lou	John Frankenheimer	
1991	Sweet War, Farewell	Silvano	Silvano Agosti	
1992	Acquitted for Having Committed the Deed	Hartman	Alberto Sordi	
1993	La Naissance de l'amour	Paul	Philippe Garrel	
1996	Irma Vep	José Mirano	Olivier Assayas	
1998	Louise (Take 2)	Louise's Father	Siegfried	
2001	Clément	François	Emmanuelle Bercot	
2006	El Cantor	Clovis	Joseph Morder	
2007	Heartbeat Detector	Arie Neumann	Nicolas Klotz	
2008	The End of the Light Age	James June Schneider		
2012	La Lapidation de Saint Etienne	Étienne	Pere Vilà Barceló	
2013	Gare du Nord	Ali	Claire Simon	
2013	The Nun	Baron de Lasson	Guillaume Nicloux	
