= Could It Happen Here? =

- Italian theatrical release poster
- Directed by: Massimo Pirri
- Written by: Morando Morandini Jr. Massimo Pirri; Federico Tofi
- Starring: Luc Merenda
- Cinematography: Riccardo Pallottini
- Music by: Coriolano Gori
- Release date: 1977
- Language: Italian

Could It Happen Here? (Italian: Italia: ultimo atto?) is a 1977 Italian political fiction thriller film that was written and directed by Massimo Pirri.

== Plot ==
Rome, 1977. In a more and more confused climate, between popular discontent and difficulties of the government, a terrorist group is training his men in anticipation of a major military action: the elimination of the Minister of the Interior. At one point, the organization decides to abandon the plan, as it is believed that a massacre would not improve the condition of the poorer classes. But Mara, the daughter of a wealthy businessman, Ferruccio, a young professor, and Bruno, a drifter guy, do not want to withdraw. On their own initiative they will make the attempt, which will be end into a massacre. The minister dies, and with him many members of his entourage as well as the same Bruno. Mara and Ferruccio manage to escape through a Rome becoming lawless. Once in a den they eventually opt to shoot each other, while outside the tanks parading through the streets: the coup started.

== Cast ==
- Luc Merenda as Ferruccio
- Marcella Michelangeli as Mara
- Andrea Franchetti as Bruno
- Lou Castel as Marco
- Ines Pellegrini as The Student on Park Bench

== See also ==
- List of Italian films of 1977
