= Francesco di Assisi =

1966 Italian film

- Screenplay by: Liliana Cavani; Tullio Pinelli
- Directed by: Liliana Cavani
- Starring: Lou Castel
- Music by: Peppino De Luca
- Country of origin: Italy
- Original languages: Italian; Latin

Production
- Producer: Leo Pescarolo
- Cinematography: Giuseppe Ruzzolini
- Editor: Luciano Gigante
- Running time: 134 minutes (film); 128 minutes (DVD)
- Production companies: Clodio Cineamatografica; RAI

Original release
- Network: RAI
- Release: 6 May 1966

Francesco di Assisi (Note: Film title according to the film's opening credits and the restored RAI DVD release.) (sometimes credited as Francesco d'Assisi), English title Francis of Assisi, is a 1966 Italian drama television film by Liliana Cavani. It was Cavani's first non-fiction feature-length film, with a screenplay written by her and Tullio Pinelli. It follows the life of Saint Francis of Assisi from 1205 until his death in 1226.

== Cast ==
- Lou Castel as Francesco
- Riccardo Cucciolla as Leone
- Giancarlo Sbragia as Francesco's father
- Marco Bellocchio as Pietro di Stacia
- Ludmilla Lvova as Chiara
- Maria Grazia Marescalchi as Pica
- Kenneth Belton as Innocent III
- John Karlsen
- Riccardo Bernardini
- Giuseppe Campodifiori
- Teodoro Cicogna
- Franco Marchesi
- Oscar Mercurelli
- Roberto Di Massimo
- Maurizio Tocchi
- John Thorner
- Marcello Formica
- Gérard Herter
- Giampiero Frondini
- Gianni Turillazzi
- Gerig Domain
- Mino Bellei

== Production and release ==
Cavani, who, in her own words, had not had a Catholic upbringing, was drawn to the character of Francis of Assisi because of Paul Sabatier's biography, regarding him a "protestor" and his venture "existential and poetic" and "revolutionary". Francesco di Assisi was her first feature film after directing a series of documentary films for television station RAI, and also the first film produced by RAI and Leo Pescarolo. As she wanted an unknown actor for the role of Francis, she gave the part to Lou Castel (whose breakthrough film Fists in the Pocket had not been released yet), and also cast the majority of his friars with non-professional actors from the region of Umbria.

Francesco di Assisi was shot on 16 mm film and aired in two parts on RAI on 6 and 8 May 1966, reaching an audience of approx. 20 million viewers. It was shown out of competition at the 27th Venice International Film Festival the same year and eventually saw a limited cinema release in 1972.

== Reception ==
Although successful, Cavani's film, compared with the works of directors Roberto Rossellini and Pier Paolo Pasolini, was also received controversially and divided viewers, critics and Catholic groups in particular. Labelled by a member of the Movimento Sociale Italiano as "heretical, blasphemous and offensive for the faith of the Italian people", it was praised by Italo Moscati for breaking the boundaries of "television conformism". In a round table discussion, Pasolini, who had liked Rossellini's interpretation of Francis of Assisi (see The Flowers of St. Francis), criticised Castel's "bourgeois" portrayal of the titular character and Cavani's omission of the "oriental" aspect of his life and the performed miracles, and her turning him into a man of action.

== Legacy ==
Francesco di Assisi was digitally restored in 2007. It has since been screened, among other events, at the Karlovy Vary International Film Festival in 2013, at the Il Cinema Ritrovato Festival in 2020 and at the Istituto Italiano di Cultura, New York, in 2023.

== See also ==
- list of films based on the life of Francis of Assisi
