= Lasarchopyge =

Lasarchopyge Temporal range: Middle Ordovician–Late Ordovician

Scientific classification
- Kingdom: Animalia
- Phylum: Arthropoda
- Clade: †Artiopoda
- Class: †Trilobita
- Order: †Proetida
- Family: †Toernquistiidae
- Genus: †Lasarchopyge; Chatterton et al., 1998

Type species
- Lasarchopyge benedettoi Chatterton et al., 1998

Other species
- Lasarchopyge apodema Owens and Fortey, 2009; Lasarchopyge correae Chatterton et al., 1998; Lasarchopyge fidicularis Owens and Fortey, 2009

Extinct genus of toernquistiid trilobite

Lasarchopyge is an extinct genus of toernquistiid trilobite that lived in Argentina and Russia during the Ordovician period.

== Etymology ==
The generic name Lasarchopyge derives from the LAS type section where it was found, the English word arch, and the common -pyge suffix for trilobite generic names referring to the tail. The specific epithet of the type species, Lasarchopyge benedettoi, honours Argentina palaeontologist and stratigrapher Luis Benedetto. The species Lasarchopyge coreae is named for the Difunta Correa. The specific epithet of the species Lasarchopyge apodema is derived from the Greek word apodemos, meaning far from home, referencing the fact that this species was discovered very far from where the type species of the genus was. The specific epithet of Lasarchopyge fidicularis means "twisted like a cord" in Latin, referencing the terrace ridges on the animal's anterior cephalic border.
