= Gianfelice Imparato =

Italian actor (born 1956)

- Born: 9 August 1956 (age 69); Castellammare di Stabia, Italy
- Occupation: Actor

Gianfelice Imparato (born 9 August 1956) is an Italian actor, playwright and stage director.

== Life and career ==
Born in Castellammare di Stabia, Imparato left his university law studies to devote himself to an acting career, and made his professional debut in the second half of the 1970s with the stage company of Mico Galdieri. He then took part in several Eduardo De Filippo's comedies and in Roberto De Simone's La Gatta Cenerentola. In 1982, he entered the stage company of Carlo Cecchi, that he left in 1987 to enter the company of Luigi De Filippo. He made his film debut in 1983, in Marco Risi's A Boy and a Girl.

In 1994, Imparato made his debut as playwright with Casa di frontiera, which he also starred in under the direction of Gigi Proietti. He started his career as stage director in 1996, directing his own comedy play Una tragedia tutta da ridere. In films, he worked with Marco Bellocchio, Matteo Garrone, Paolo Sorrentino, Nanni Moretti, Ettore Scola, Mario Monicelli, Gabriele Muccino, Mario Martone. In 2022, he got a Nastro d'Argento nomination for his performance in Querido Fidel.

== Selected filmography ==
=== Cinema ===
- A Boy and a Girl (1983)
- Sweet Body of Bianca (1984)
- Henry IV (1984)
- Facciamo paradiso (1995)
- The Story of a Poor Young Man (1995)
- Pugili (1995)
- Dirty Linen (1999)
- Two Friends (2002)
- My Mother's Smile (2002)
- Gomorrah (2008)
- Il divo (2008)
- Fort Apache Napoli (2009)
- Into Paradiso (2010)
- Love & Slaps (2010)
- Banana (2014)
- Good for Nothing (2014)
- Natale col Boss (2015)
- There's No Place Like Home (2018)
- Cetto c'è, senzadubbiamente (2019)
- Figli (2020)
- The King of Laughter (2021)
- Blessed Boys (2021)
- The Hidden Child (2021)
- U.S. Palmese (2024)

=== Television ===
- A che punto è la notte, TV miniseries (1994)
- Un medico in famiglia, TV series (Season 8, 2013)
- 1992, TV series (2015)
- The Bastards of Pizzofalcone, TV series (2017-present)
- 1993, TV series (2017)
- 1994, TV series (2019)
