= Religion in Argentina =

Religion in Argentina (Latinobarómetro 2024)
1. Catholicism (63.0%)
2. Evangelicalism (8.80%)
3. Jehovah's Witnesses (0.30%)
4. Other Christians (0.90%)
5. No religion (26.2%)
6. Other religion (0.80%)
7. Unanswered (0.10%)

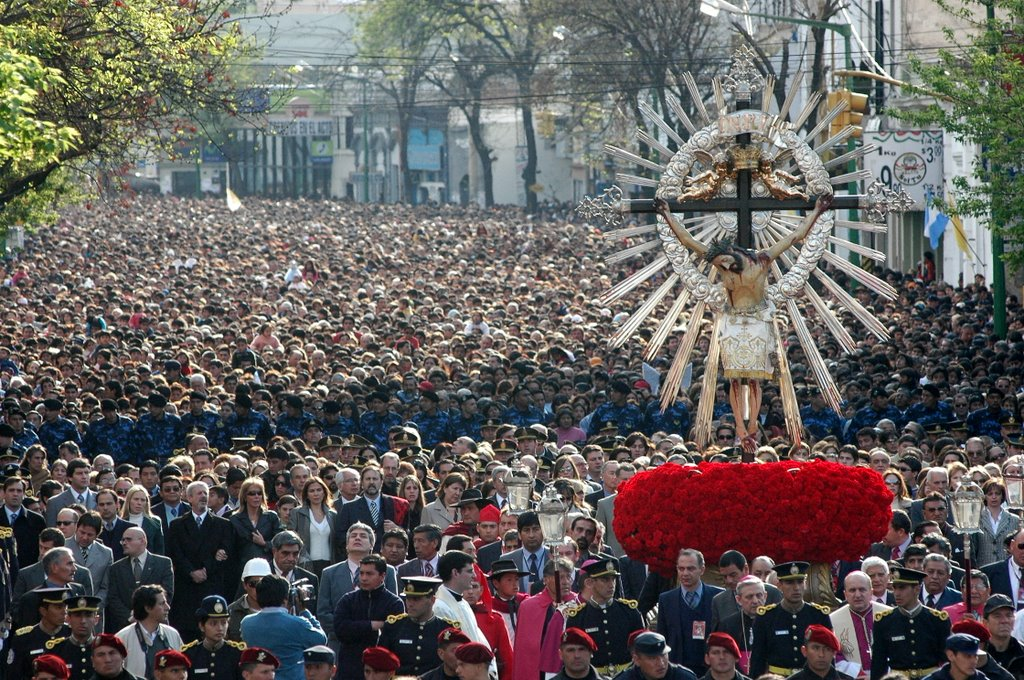
Argentine Christians commemorating the crucifixion of Jesus in Salta city.

Christianity is the most widely professed religion in Argentina, with Catholicism being its largest denomination. This historical background is very much due to the Spanish influence brought about through the newly conquered territories. However, affiliation with Protestant churches is increasing, and immigration throughout the 20th century has brought other religions from various regions to Argentina.

Argentina is a secular nation and its constitution guarantees freedom of religion. Good Friday and Christmas are recognised as national holidays.

== Christianity ==
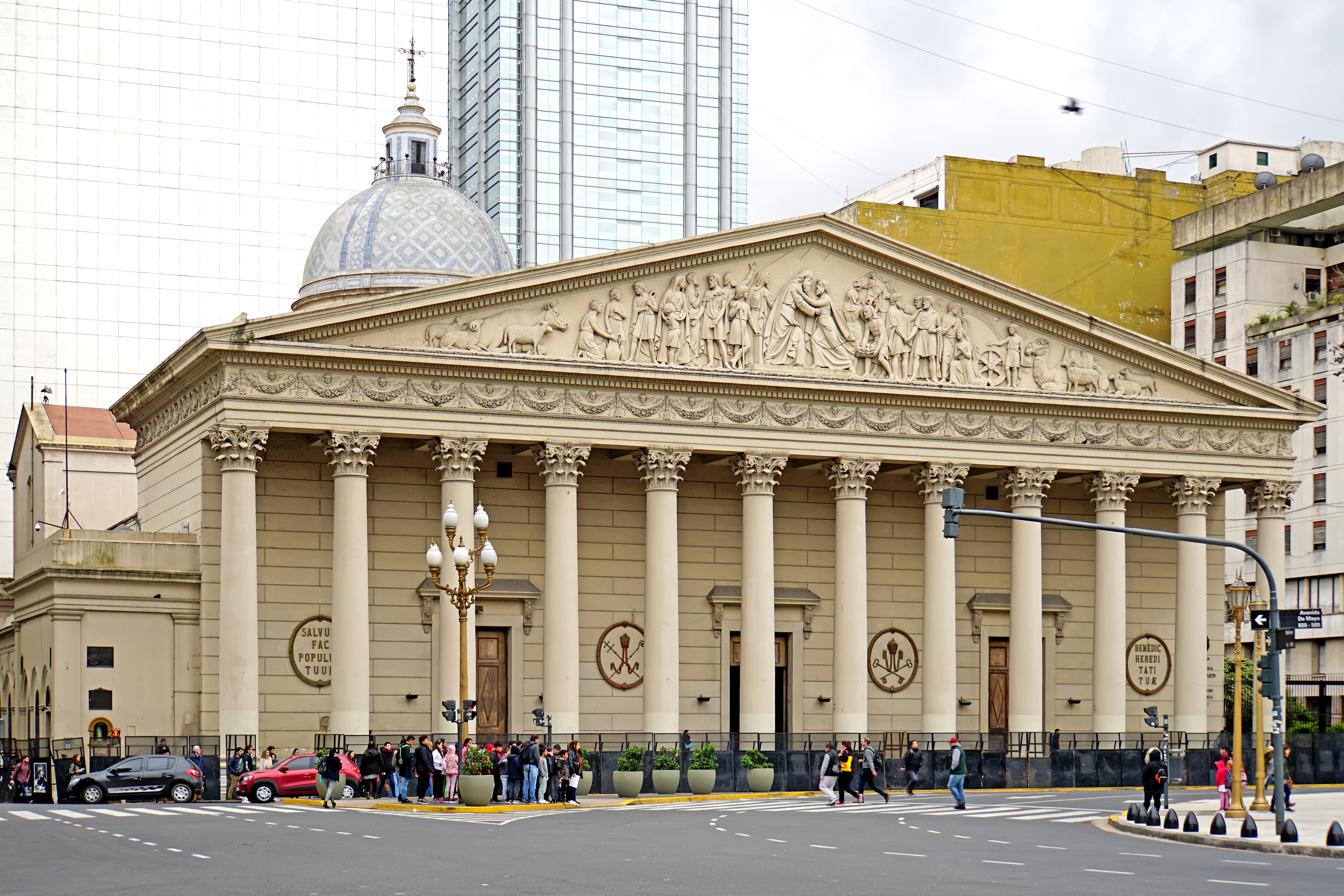
The Metropolitan Cathedral of the Most Holy Trinity of Buenos Aires, seat of the Archdiocese of Buenos Aires.

=== Catholicism ===
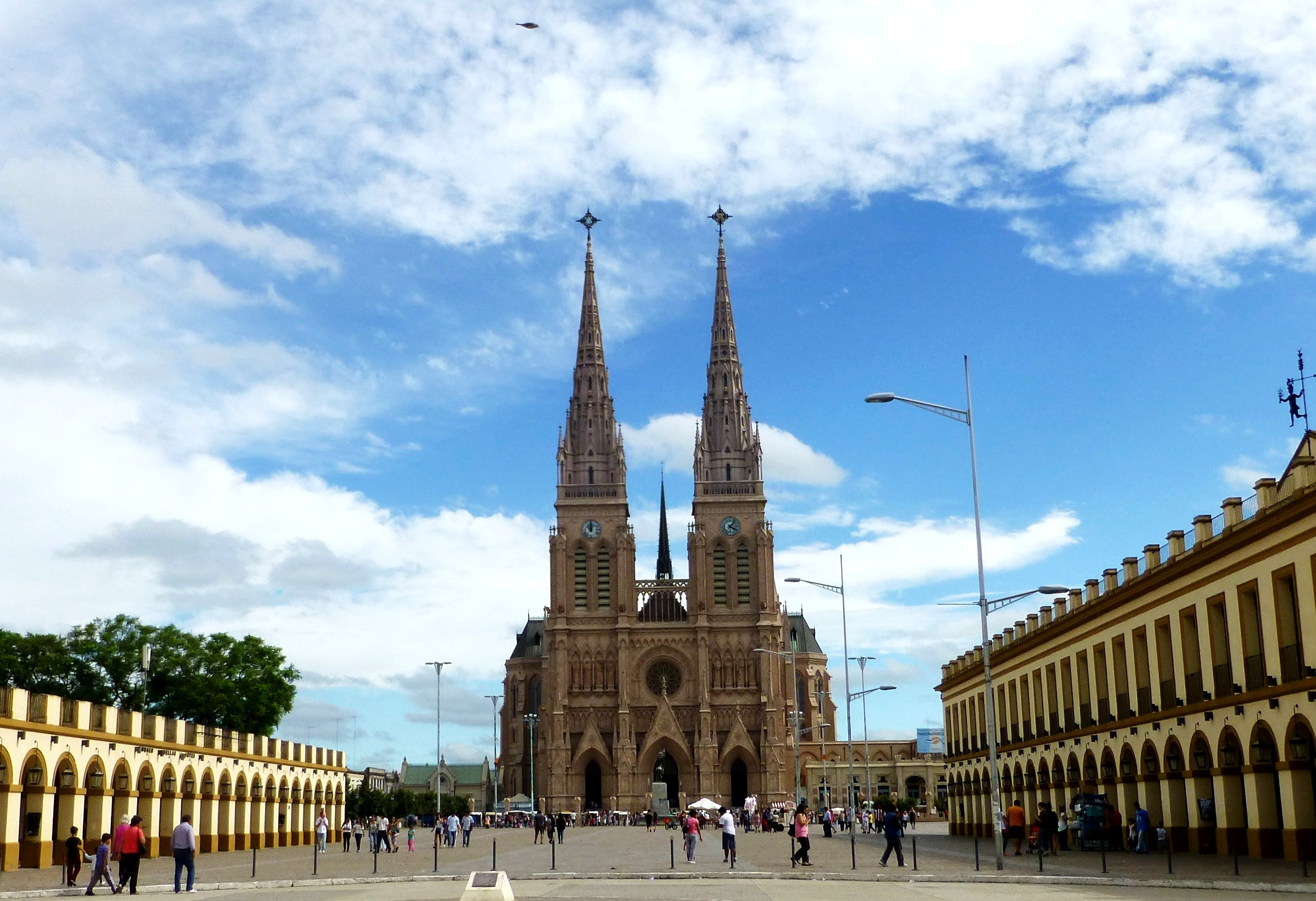
The Basilica of Our Lady of Luján.

In 2020, estimates for the number of Catholics vary from as low as 62.9% of the population, to as much as 92.12%. The CIA Factbook lists 92% of the country as Catholic, but adds that less than 20% practice their faith regularly.

Argentina's society, culture, and politics are deeply imbued with Catholicism. The Church's place in Argentine national identity, which spans across the ideological spectrum, stems from the perpetual ability of Argentines on different sides of political and social divides to find some level of support in the Church. The Church solidified its hold on the territory of modern-day Argentina during the period of Spanish colonial rule from the 16th to early 19th centuries. Church leaders variously supported and opposed the policies of Juan Perón and the violent tactics of the Dirty War. Although Catholicism is not the official religion of the state, and freedom of religion is guaranteed by the Constitution, Catholic representatives take part in many state functions. Today, areas of Church-State contention include contraception, economic policies, and the disputed involvement of the Church in the Dirty War.

Catholic practices in Argentina (especially in indigenous areas) might be seen as incorporating a great deal of syncretism; for example, religious festivals in the north-western provinces feature Catholic icons in (or along with) ancient Andean indigenous ceremonies. The Pachamama worship is still widespread throughout Salta and Jujuy along with Catholic beliefs, without opposition from the Catholic bishops.

The church in Argentina is divided into dioceses and archdioceses. Buenos Aires, for example, is an archdiocese owing to is size and historical significance as the nation's capital. Buenos Aires Metropolitan Cathedral, the seat of the archbishop, houses the remains of General José de San Martín in a mausoleum.

There are nine Catholic universities in Argentina: the Pontifical Catholic University of Argentina (Buenos Aires), the Universidad del Salvador (Buenos Aires), the Universidad Católica de Córdoba, the Universidad de La Plata, the Universidad de Salta, the Universidad de Santa Fe, the Universidad de Cuyo, and the Universidad de Santiago del Estero. Religious orders run and sponsor hundreds of primary and secondary schools throughout the country, with and without government funding.

Cardinal Archbishop of Buenos Aires Jorge Bergoglio of Argentina was elected to the papacy, as Pope Francis, on 13 March 2013.

=== Other Christian denominations ===
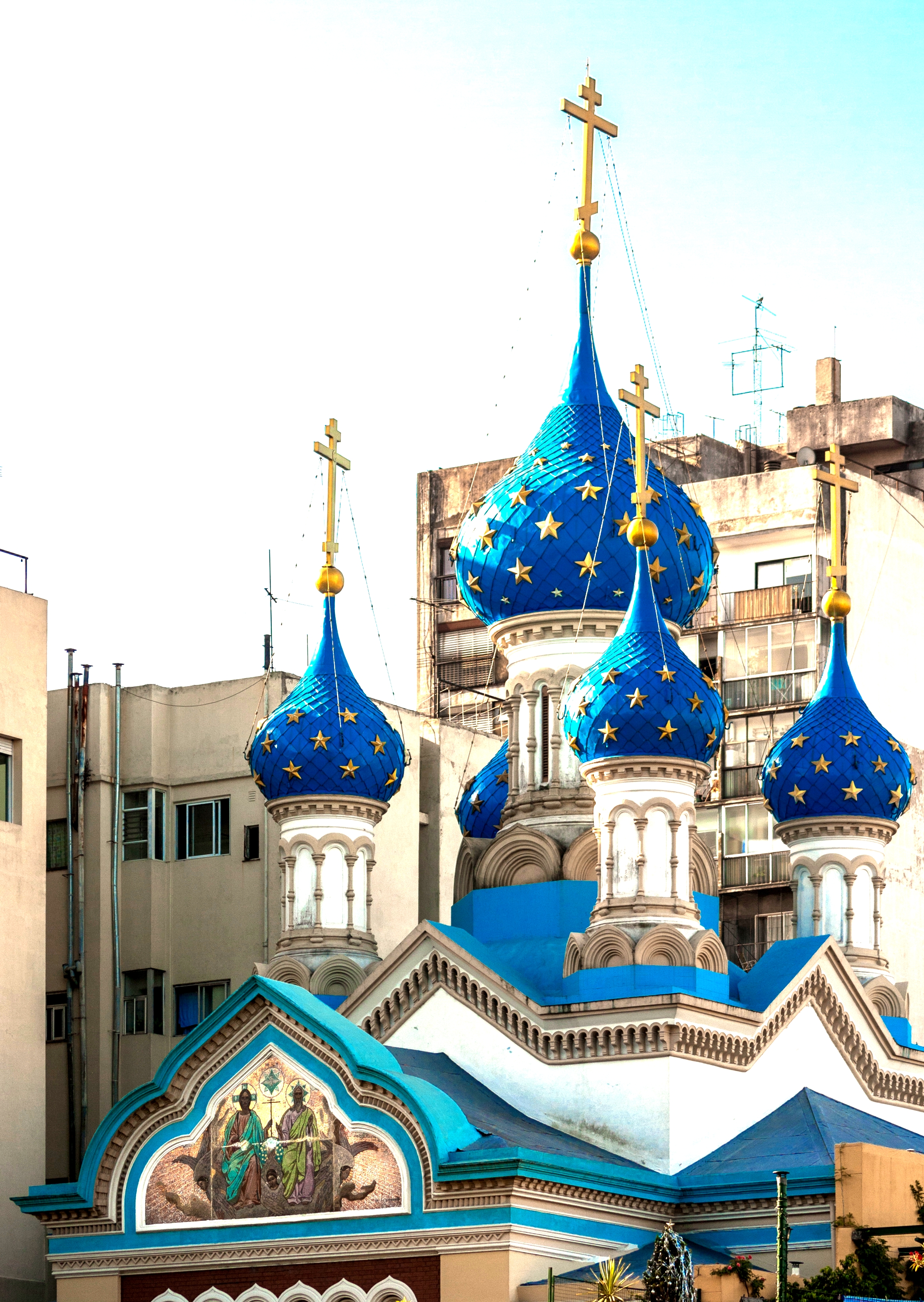
The Russian Orthodox Cathedral of the Holy Trinity.

Protestant churches have been gaining ground since the 1980s. In Latin America, most Protestants are called Evangélicos (Evangelicals). One survey in 2008 found approximately 9% of the total population were Protestant; most of whom, 7.9% of the total population were Pentecostal. While Pentecostal churches originally attracted mostly the lower class, they show an increasing appeal to the urban middle class. Middle class congregations develop a distinctive style of Pentecostalism, more adapted to society.

In addition 1.2% of the population were Jehovah's Witnesses and 0.9% The Church of Jesus Christ of Latter-day Saints. This study also found that Protestants were the only group in which a majority regularly attended services. A 2013 survey found 15% Protestant (9% Pentecostal,4% refusing to say which Protestant denomination and 2% mainline ).

The Church of Jesus Christ of Latter-day Saints claims over 505,000 members with five temples and 742 congregations.

The very first Waldensian settlers from Italy arrived in South America in 1856 and today the Waldensian Church of the Río de La Plata (which forms a united church with the Waldensian Evangelical Church) has approximately 40 congregations and 15,000 members shared between Uruguay and Argentina.

The Argentine Catholic Apostolic Church is a derivative movement of the Brazilian Catholic Apostolic Church (Igreja Católica Apostólica Brasileira) founded by the excommunicated Roman Catholic Bishop Carlos Duarte Costa of Brazil in 1945. The Argentine Catholic Apostolic Church was founded, according to varying sources, in 1970 or 1971, in Buenos Aires by its first Archbishop–Primate Leonardo Morizio Dominguez.

The Anglican Church of the Southern Cone of America represents the Anglican Communion in Argentina.

A 2015 study estimates some 2,200 Christian believers from a Muslim background in the country, most of them belonging to some form of Protestantism.

Orthodox Christianity is represented by Antiochian, Constantinople, Russian, Serbian, Romanian and Greek Orthodox Churches.

== Religious minorities ==
=== Islam ===
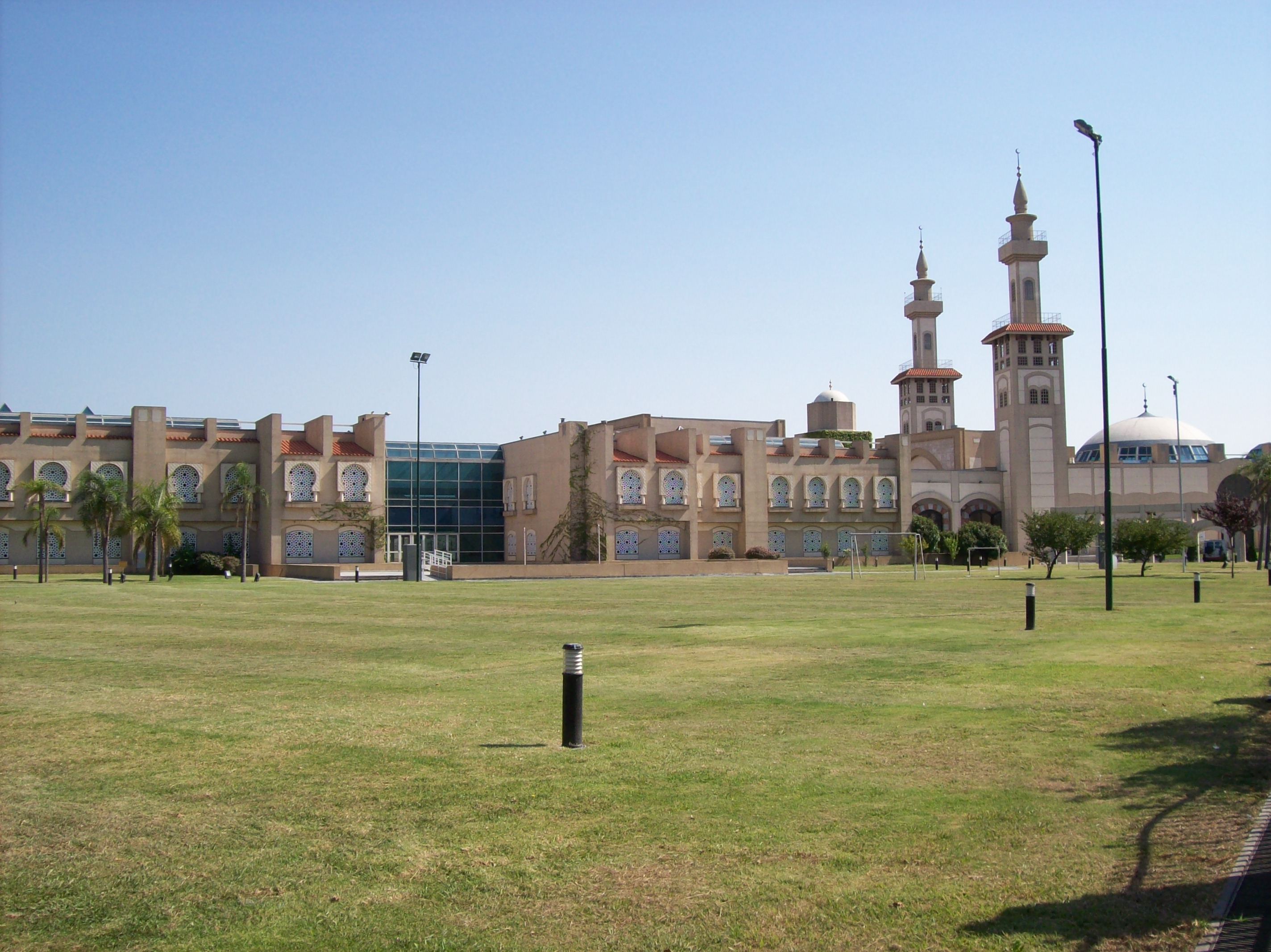
King Fahd Islamic Cultural Center

Argentina has the largest Muslim minority in Latin America. Although the national census does not ask about religious affiliation, precluding accurate statistics, Argentina's Muslim community is estimated to number around 2.14% of the total population by the World Christian Database (2022), which is roughly 910,000. According to a US report, it estimates in 500,000 to 600,000.

The 20th century saw an influx of immigrants from the Ottoman Empire, mostly Arabs from Syria and Lebanon. They are generically called 'Turcos' (Turks) in Argentina, because when most arrived, Lebanon and Syria were territories of the Turkish Ottoman Empire. It is estimated that today there are about 3.5 million Argentines of Arab descent. The majority of these Arab immigrants were Arab Christians and some were Mizrahi and Sephardic Jews. Though accurate information is unavailable, it is likely that less than a quarter of Arab migrants were Muslim Arabs. The descendants of Mizrahi and Sephardic Jews are more likely to identify themselves as just Jews rather than Arab Jews today.

The King Fahd Islamic Cultural Center, the largest mosque in South America, was completed in 1996 with the help of the Custodian of the Two Holy Mosques, on a piece of land measuring 20,000 m^{2}. The total land area granted by the Argentine government measures 34,000 m^{2}, and was offered by President Carlos Menem following his visit to Saudi Arabia in 1992. The project cost around US$30 million, includes a mosque, library, two schools, and a park, and is located in the middle-class district of Palermo, Buenos Aires.

The Islamic Organization of Latin America (IOLA), headquartered in Argentina, is considered an active organization in Latin America in promoting Islamic-affiliated endeavors. The IOLA holds events to promote the unification of Muslims living in Latin America, as well as the propagation of Islam.

=== Judaism ===
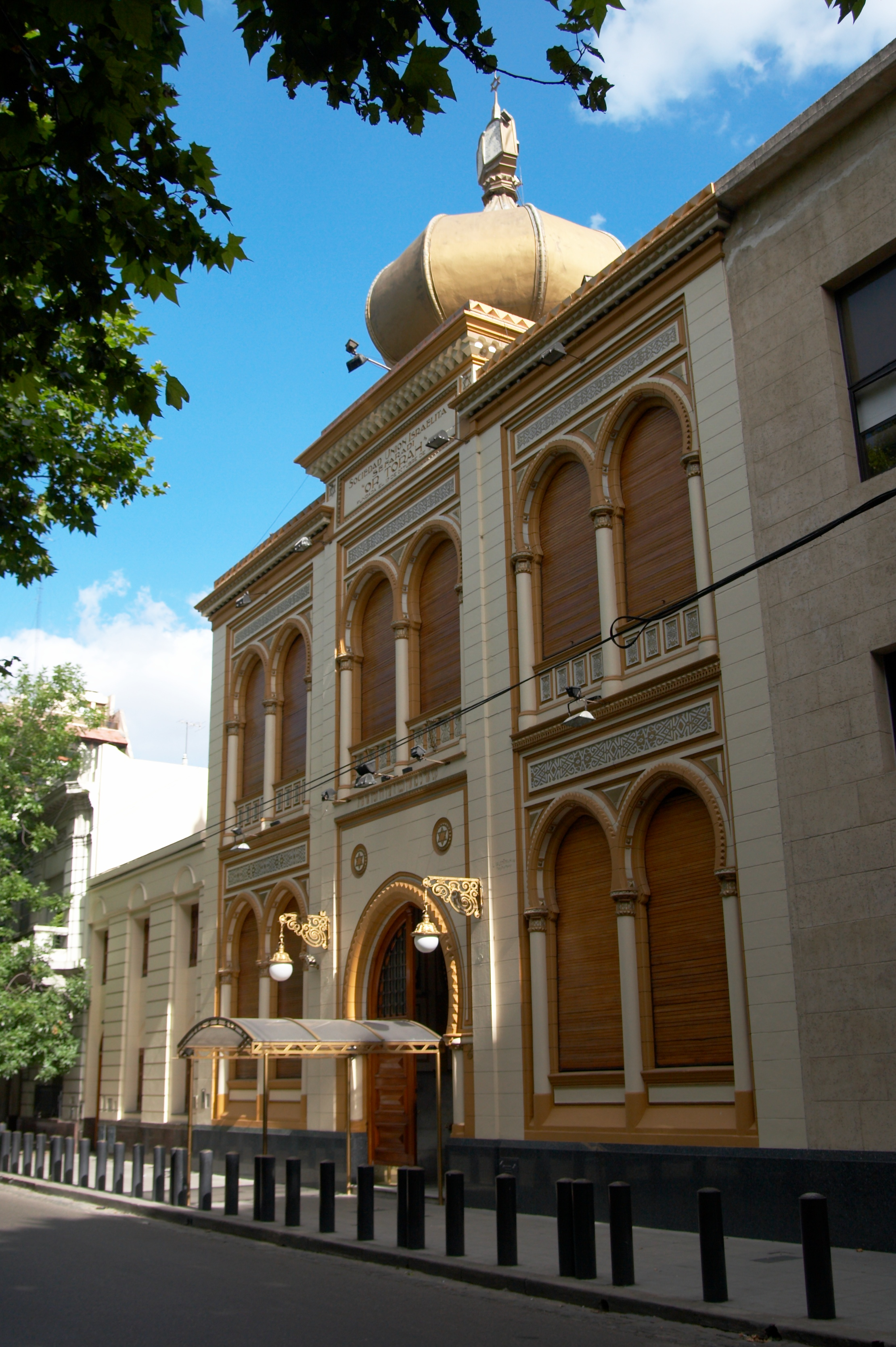
Synagogue Or Torah in Buenos Aires.

Argentina has the largest Jewish population in Latin America and south of the Tropic of Cancer, with about 300,000 people. The community numbered about 400,000 after World War II, but the appeal of Israel, and economic and cultural pressures at home, led many to leave for Israel, Europe, or the United States; recent instability in Israel has resulted in a modest reversal of the trend since 2003.

One of the Jewish groups in Argentina includes the Sephardi Jews, composed of Spanish and Portuguese migrants to Argentina. Migration began in the 18th century and continued until a few years following the birth of Israel. A majority of Sephardi Jews migrated to Argentina because of both groups speaking the Spanish language. However, after the creation of Israel, Sephardi tensions amongst Muslims in Latin American countries began to rise resulting in the remaining Sephardi populations, found mainly in Morocco, migrating to Argentina. Buenos Aires holds almost the entire Sephardic Jewish population in Argentina, home to roughly 50,000. In Argentina, Sephardi Jews remained separate of Ashkenazi Jews, who in the later half of the 20th century, made up most of the Jewish population in Latin America. However, as an overwhelming amount of the Argentinian population became Ashkenazic, the Sephardic Jews began marrying outside of the Sephardi Jewish community.

Although Jews account for less than 1% of Argentina's population, Buenos Aires has the largest population of Jews in the Americas, outside of the United States. It is the seventh largest Jewish community in the world.

=== Buddhism ===
Buddhism in Argentina has been practiced since the early 1980s.

Although Argentina is largely Roman Catholic, Chinese immigrants established the first Chinese Buddhist temple in 1986, and Korean immigrants founded their own temple. Since then many practicing groups have been founded, some of them rooted in the popular Sōtō tradition from Japan, but also in many Tibetan practices, such as meditation(Mahamudra, Dzog Chen, Lam Rim).

The XIV Dalai Lama visited Buenos Aires twice. The first time was in 2006, the second in 2011.

=== Hinduism ===
Argentina has 2,030 persons of Indian origin (PIOs) and 1,300 non-resident Indians (NRIs). Some of them still refer to ayurveda, practice yoga, enjoy Indian classical music and speak South Asian dialects and languages. They have established an Indian Association in the northern provinces and organize social and cultural events to celebrate Indian festivals. There is little interaction between them and those who have settled down in other parts of the extensive country. A large number of the Indian diaspora living in Buenos Aires are businessmen, doctors, financial or business executives, and employees of multinational corporations. Most of them have retained their Indian citizenship. Many Hindus are Indo-Caribbeans from Guyana, Jamaica, Trinidad and Tobago, and Suriname.

=== Paganism ===
According to a New York Times article there is a witch's group with over 25,000 followers and possibly millions of practitioners of Argentine cábala (not to be confused with Kabballah from which the term descends), a practice blending astrology, superstition, soccer, and paraphernalia associated with neopaganism.. There is also at least one organization active that insists Wicca is not a “secta” (Spanish for cult) since it is performed in solitary in its individual form.

== Legal status ==
The Constitution states that the federal government sustains the Apostolic Roman Catholic religion, but guarantees freedom of religion. In a 2023 study assessing nations' levels of religious regulation and persecution with scores ranging from 0-10 where 0 represented low levels of regulation or persecution, Argentina received a score of 1.5 on Government Regulation of Religion, 4.7 on Social Regulation of Religion and 8.1 on Government Favoritism of Religion. In the same year, the country was scored 4 out of 4 for religious freedom by Freedom House, a US government funded think tank.

The law that regulates the acknowledgement of religions by the state dates from 1978, and makes it prohibitively bureaucratic for minority religions to attain official recognition, since it was passed by the dictatorial government of the time in order to search those cults for politically subversive elements.

=== State-Catholic church relations ===
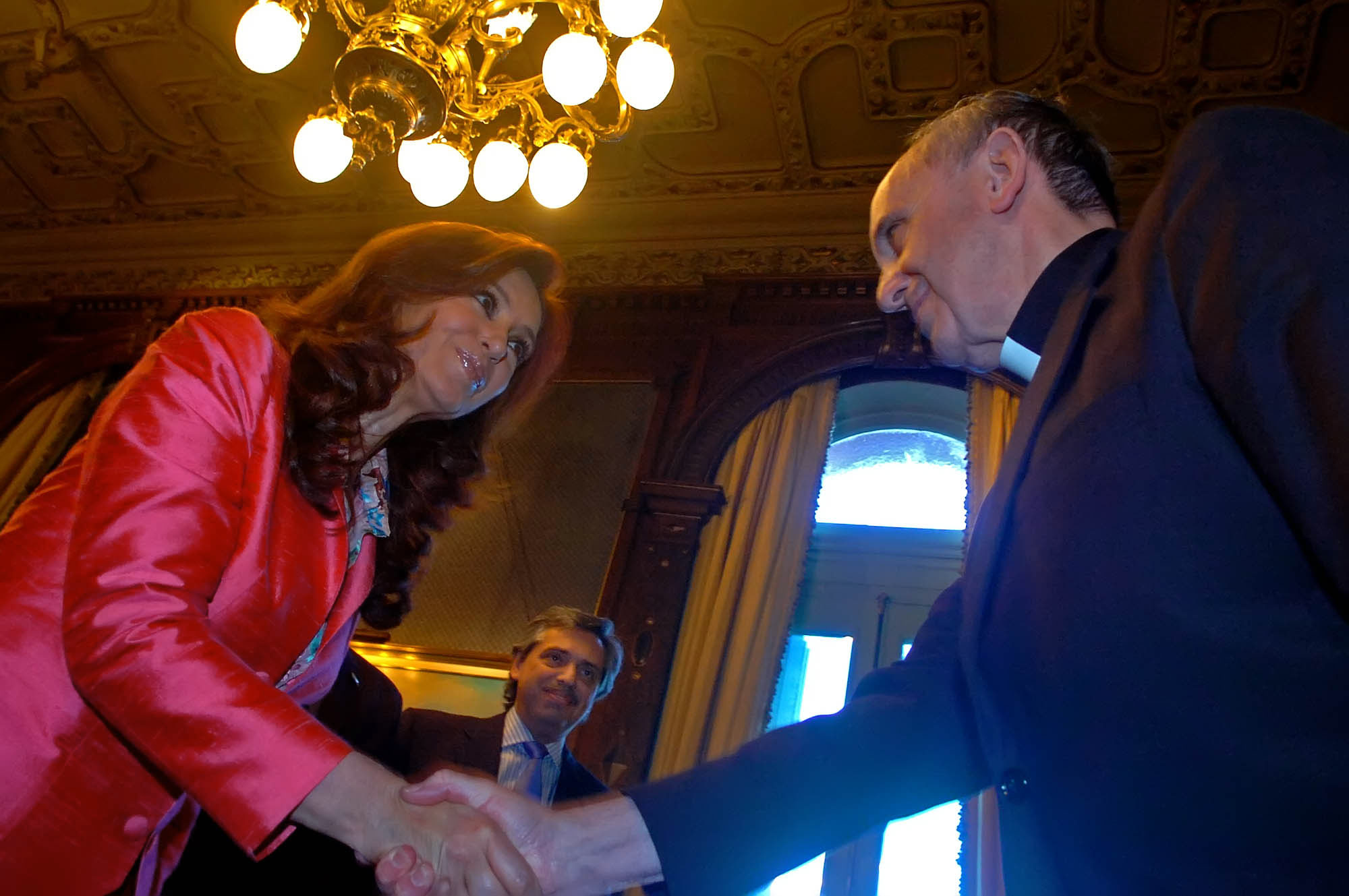
President Cristina Kirchner receives Archbishop Jorge Bergoglio (2007)

The Constitution requires the government to support Roman Catholicism economically. Despite this, the Supreme Court ruled that the Roman Catholic Church was not granted the status of official religion by the constitution or any federal legislation.

The Constitution once stated that the president must be a Roman Catholic. This requirement was removed from the text in the 1994 constitutional reform, since the president no longer designates Argentine bishops. The old 1853 text also included a goal "to keep a pacific relationship with the Indians and promote their conversion to Catholicism", which was deleted in the reform.

Each bishops receives a monthly salary from the state. Older seminarians and retired priests receive state pensions, and parishes in convective or near the border are subsidised. The state also subsidises catholic schools.

== Popular cults and other smaller religions in Argentina ==
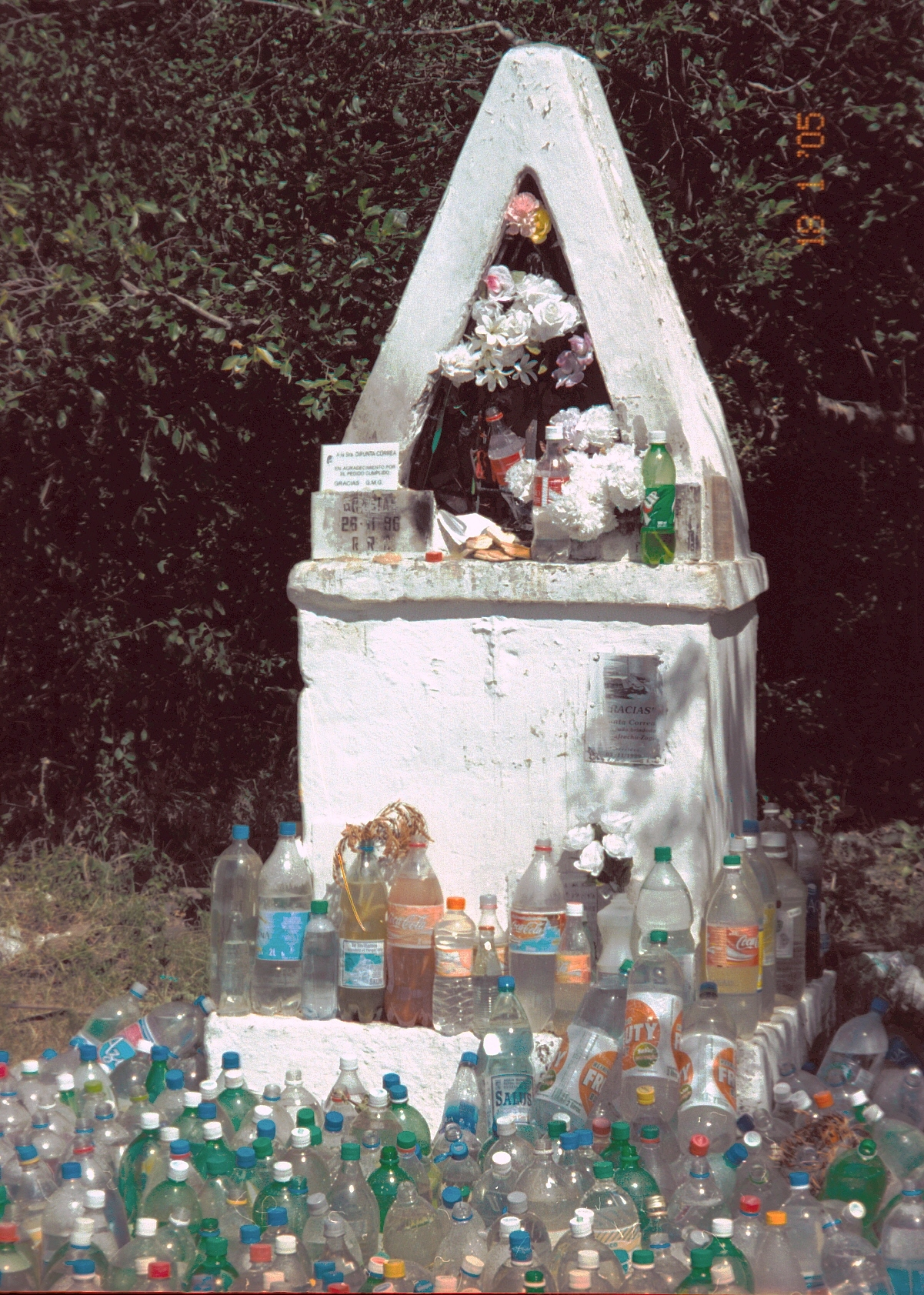
Sanctuary dedicated to the Difunta Correa, located near Tacuarembó (Uruguay).

Besides mainstream religious practices, there are also a number of unconventional practices, usually part of local folklore. One of the most famous is the veneration of La Difunta Correa ("The Deceased Correa"). Many other beliefs in advocations of the Virgin, saints and other religious characters exist throughout the country, which are locally or regionally popular and church-endorsed.

Another popular cult is that of the Gauchito Gil ("the little gaucho Gil", Antonio Mamerto Gil Núñez), born in the province of Corrientes (allegedly in 1847). Gil was forced to enlist to fight in the civil war, but he deserted and became an outlaw à la Robin Hood.

From Río Negro Province, Ceferino Namuncurá, son of the Mapuche cacique Manuel Namuncurá, is also a source of veneration all over Patagonia. He died of tuberculosis with only 18 years of age, while in Italy during his catholic education, and was later named venerable by the Vatican.

There is also the popular cult of Miguel Ángel Gaitán, from Villa Unión, in La Rioja, known as El Angelito Milagroso ("The Miraculous Little Angel"), an infant who died of meningitis just short of his first birthday, who people recur to for requests and miracles.

The Iglesia Maradoniana is sport themed self-subscribed Parody religion founded by three fans at Christmas party for creating a new religion based around their favorite football player Diego Maradona. Since then it has gained between 120,000 and 200,000 followers since the 'religion' was founded.

== Affiliation estimates ==
Evangelical churches have been gaining a foothold since the 1980s, with approximately 9% of the total population. Pentecostal churches and traditional Protestant denominations are present in many communities.

In 2023, The Church of Jesus Christ of Latter-day Saints claims 474,985 followers in Argentina (their seventh-largest congregation in the world).

According to a 2008 CONICET survey on creeds, about 76.5% of Argentines are Roman Catholic, 11.3% religiously indifferent, 9% Protestant (with 7.9% in Pentecostal denominations), 1.2% Jehovah's Witnesses, and 0.9% Mormons.

A 2008 survey called America's Barometer by the Vanderbilt University reported for Argentina, Catholic 77.1%, No religion 15.9%, Protestant, Evangelical and other Christian 4.8% (with Pentecostal 3.3%), Other 2.1%.

A 2019 survey made online by the Universidad de San Andrés showed that 59% of Argentines identify themselves as Catholics, 8% as Protestant, 9% follow other religions, 15% consider themselves not religious, 1% identified themselves as either Jewish or Muslim, and a further 7% refused to answer. The same survey revealed that 76% of Argentines believe in God (a decrease from 91% in 2008), 44% believe in heaven, 32% believe in hell, around 29% pray daily, only 13% attend religious services weekly, and about 24% consider religion to be very important in their lives.

Religion in Argentina (CONICET 2019)
| Affiliation | % of Population |
|---|---|
| Christian | 79.6 |
| Roman Catholic | 62.9 |
| Pentecostal | 13.0 |
| Other Evangelical | 2.3 |
| Jehovah's Witness and Mormon | 1.4 |
| No religion | 18.9 |
| None | 9.7 |
| Atheist | 6.0 |
| Agnostic | 3.2 |
| Other religions | 1.2 |

=== Religious division by region ===
Religion in Greater Buenos Aires (CONICET 2019)
1. Catholicism (56.4%)
2. Evangelism (15.0%)
3. No religion (26.2%)
4. Other/Don't know (2.40%)
Religion in the Pampas (CONICET 2019)
1. Catholicism (65.7%)
2. Evangelism (11.3%)
3. Mormonism (2.50%)
4. No religion (18.6%)
5. Other/Don't know (1.90%)
Religion in the Northeast (CONICET 2019)
1. Catholicism (67.4%)
2. Evangelism (23.1%)
3. No religion (7.00%)
4. Other/Don't know (2.50%)
Religion in Patagonia (CONICET 2019)
1. Catholicism (51.0%)
2. Evangelism (24.3%)
3. No religion (24.4%)
4. Other/Don't know (0.30%)
Religion in Cuyo (CONICET 2019)
1. Catholicism (69.6%)
2. Evangelism (14.5%)
3. Mormonism (2.60%)
4. No religion (13.2%)
5. Other/Don't know (0.10%)
Religion in the Northwest (CONICET 2019)
1. Catholicism (76.0%)
2. Evangelism (16.7%)
3. Mormonism (1.70%)
4. No religion (5.00%)
5. Other/Don't know (0.60%)

== See also ==
- Roman Catholicism in Argentina
- Islam in Argentina
- Judaism in Argentina
- Buddhism in Argentina
- Hinduism in Argentina
- Freedom of religion in Argentina
- Religion in the United Provinces of the Río de la Plata
