= In the Highest of Skies =

1977 Italian film

- Directed by: Silvano Agosti
- Written by: Silvano Agosti; Francesco Costa; Stefano Rulli
- Produced by: Silvano Agosti
- Cinematography: Claudio Tondi
- Edited by: Silvano Agosti
- Music by: Nicola Piovani
- Release date: 1976
- Language: Italian

In the Highest of Skies (Italian: Nel più alto dei cieli) is a 1976 Italian surreal drama film co-written and directed by Silvano Agosti.

== Cast ==
- Livio Barbo as Sandro
- Edy Biagetti as Luigi
- Gisella Burinato as Camilla
- Giorgio Bonora as Andrea
- Francesca Cacciolati as Vera
- Clara Colosimo as Teresa
- Francesca Romana Coluzzi as Maura
- Alberto Cracco as Italo
- Francesco Costa as Fausto
- Jorge Krimer as Adelio
- Franco Lotterio as Giulio
- Marcella Michelangeli as Eugenia
- Fabienne Pasquet as Rosa
- Antonio Piovanelli as Carlo

== Release ==
The film premiered at the 35th Venice International Film Festival. It was released in Italian cinemas in late 1977.

== Reception ==
Film Comment's critic Chris Shields noted: "for a film that takes place almost entirely in an elevator, [...] In the Highest of Skies is surprisingly dynamic in its camerawork and treatment of space". He remarked the similarities with Luis Buñuel's The Exterminating Angel, even if "Agosti's characters are not only figuratively trapped but physically confined", and wrote: "for Agosti, the film is not about salvation in the face of moral transgression but the violence inherent in dogmatic belief. His elevator is the inescapable prison of closed thinking". Similarly, Piero Zanotto from La Stampa also paired the film to Buñuel's works, describing it as "a Bunuel with an added dose of ideological virulence".

Davide Comotti from Cinefilia Ritrovata described it as "an alien film, a black jewel of Italian auteur cinema", with "a minimalist plot, where it is the inventiveness of the screenplay and the creativity of the direction that makes it compelling - and almost suspenseful". According to Italian film critic Paolo Mereghetti the film is "unconvincing", "confused in its assumptions, predictable in its developments, although, with its crazy happening tones, indicative of a particular season of Italian cinema".
