= Fulvio Wetzl =

Italian filmmaker (born 1953)

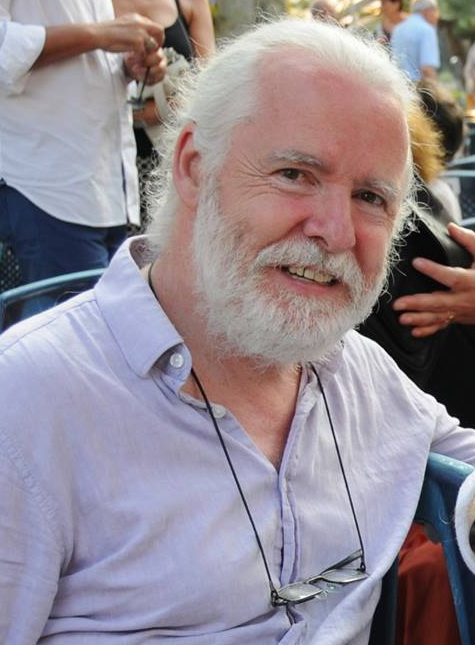
- Born: 12 March 1953 (age 73); Padua, Italy
- Occupation: Filmmaker

Fulvio Wetzl (born March 12, 1953, in Padua) is an Italian filmmaker.

== Filmography ==
- "Rorret" starring Lou Castel, Anna Galiena, Massimo Venturiello, Enrica Rosso, Patrizia Punzo (1987 – Forum Berlin International Film Festival 1988 – distributed in U.S. by Dan Talbot New Yorker Films – first release on February 8, 1989, at Forum 1 in New York)
- "Quattro Figli Unici" (Four only children) with Valentina Holtkamp, Roberto Citran, Mariella Valentini, Ivano Marescotti (1992 – Italian Film Panorama – Venice Film Festival 1992)
- "Prima la musica, poi le parole" (First Music, then the Words) with Andrei Chalimon (Kolya), Anna Bonaiuto, Jacques Perrin, Amanda Sandrelli, Gigio Alberti, Barbara Enrichi (1998 – Giffoni Film Festival in competition 1999)
- "Un mondo diverso è possibile" (Another World is Possible) (codirected with 32 Italian directors – among others Francesco Maselli, Mario Monicelli, Gillo Pontecorvo – documentary, 2001)
- "Faces-Facce" (codirected with Francesco Tanzi – documentary, 2001)
- "La primavera del 2002" (codirected with 44 Italian directors – among others Francesco Maselli, Mario Monicelli, Gillo Pontecorvo – documentary, 2002)
- "Fame di diritti" (codirected with Francesco Tanzi – documentary, 2002)
- "Lettere dalla Palestina" (Letters from Palestine) (codirected with Franco Angeli, Giuliana Berlinguer, Maurizio Carrassi, Giuliana Gamba, Roberto Giannarelli, Wilma Labate, Francesco Ranieri Martinotti, Francesco Maselli, Mario Monicelli, Ettore Scola – feature film – Forum Berlin International Film Festival 2002)
- "Aida delle marionette" (documentary, 2003)
- "Firenze, il nostro domani" (Florence, our Tomorrow) (codirected with Franco Angeli, Franco Bernini, Francesca Comencini, Nicholas Ferrari, Gianfranco Fiore, Franco Giraldi, Francesco Maselli, Mario Monicelli, Gillo Pontecorvo – documentary, 2003)
- "Darsi alla macchia" ( medium-length film, 2003)
- "1806, dalla terra alla città" (1806, from Land to Town) (medium-length film, 2005)
- "Scolari" (medium-length film, 2006)
- "Non voltarmi le spalle" (Don't Turn Your Back) with Valeria Vaiano, Stefania Pedrotti (2006)
- "Mineurs-minatori & minori" (Mineurs – Miners and Children) with Franco Nero, Valeria Vaiano, Antonino Iuorio, Ulderico Pesce, Cosimo Fusco, Dre Steemans, Walter Golia, Tiziano Murano (Giffoni Film Festival Panorama 2007 – Los Angeles, Italy, Film, Fashion and Art Festival 2007)
- "...Il catalogo è questo" (documentary, 2008)
- "Vultour, le tracce del sacro – territorio ed identità" (Vultour, Traces of the Sacred – Territory, and Identity) (documentary, 2008)
- "Libera nos a malo" (documentary, 2008)
- "Stella e strisce – Star and Stripes" (film in preparation, 2010–2014)
- "Prima la trama, poi il fondo" (documentary, codirector Laura Bagnoli, 2013) starring the artist Renata Pfeiffer
- "Rubando Bellezza" (codirectors Danny Biancardi and Laura Bagnoli – longfeature documentary, 2015) with Bernardo Bertolucci, Lucilla Albano Bertolucci, Fabrizio Gifuni, Sonia Bergamasco, Morando Morandini

== Critique ==
The film Rorret, which Wetzl co-wrote and directed, was described as having "turn[ed] a thriller into a yawner" by the Boston Globe, but was considered "a cinematic shrine to the creepy classics" by the Buffalo News Vincent Canby on New York Times about the film wrote: "The movie can be best appreciated as the work of an obsessed, talented, ultimately very practical film student."

The film "First the Music Then the Word" was shown in several U.S. film festivals. Among others San Diego Film Festival, 2000, Italian Film Festival of Marin County, 1999, N.I.C.E. (New Italian Cinema Events) in 1998 in New York (Quad Cinema) and San Francisco (Kabuki Theater). "First the Music Then the Word" was also the Opening Night Gala film at the 2nd Toronto Italian Film Festival on June 16, 2000
