= Love & Slaps =

- Theatrical release poster
- Directed by: Sergio Castellitto
- Screenplay by: Sergio Castellitto; Margaret Mazzantini
- Story by: Margaret Mazzantini
- Produced by: Luigi Musini; Roberto Cicutto
- Starring: Sergio Castellitto; Laura Morante; Enzo Jannacci; Marco Giallini; Barbora Bobuľová; Gianfelice Imparato
- Cinematography: Gianfilippo Corticelli
- Edited by: Francesca Calvelli
- Music by: Arturo Annecchino
- Production companies: Cinemaundici; Alien Produzioni
- Distributed by: Warner Bros. Pictures
- Release date: 7 December 2010
- Running time: 116 minutes
- Country: Italy
- Language: Italian
- Box office: $4.9 million

Love & Slaps (Italian: La bellezza del somaro) is a 2010 Italian comedy film directed by and starring Sergio Castellitto.

It was released in Italy on 7 December 2010 by Warner Bros. Pictures.

== Cast ==
- Sergio Castellitto as Marcello Sinibaldi
- Laura Morante as Marina Sinibaldi
- Enzo Jannacci as Armando
- Marco Giallini as Duccio
- Barbora Bobuľová as Lory
- Gianfelice Imparato as Valentino
- Nina Torresi as Rosa
- Emanuela Grimalda as Raimonda
- Lidia Vitale as Delfina Margheriti
- Renato Marchetti as Ettore Maria
- Lola Ponce as Gladys
