= Henry IV (film) =

1984 film

- DVD cover
- Directed by: Marco Bellocchio
- Written by: Luigi Pirandello (play); Marco Bellocchio; Tonino Guerra
- Produced by: Enzo Porcelli; Renzo Rossellini
- Starring: Marcello Mastroianni; Claudia Cardinale
- Cinematography: Giuseppe Lanci
- Edited by: Mirco Garrone
- Music by: Astor Piazzolla
- Release date: 24 May 1984
- Running time: 95 minutes
- Country: Italy
- Language: Italian

Henry IV (Italian: Enrico IV) is a 1984 Italian drama film directed by Marco Bellocchio. It is based on the Luigi Pirandello play of the same name and has music by Astor Piazzolla. It was entered into the 1984 Cannes Film Festival.

== Cast ==
- Marcello Mastroianni as Henry IV
- Claudia Cardinale as Matilda
- Leopoldo Trieste as Psychiatrist
- Paolo Bonacelli as Belcredi
- Gianfelice Imparato
- Claudio Spadaro
- Giuseppe Cederna
- Giacomo Bertozzi
- Fabrizio Macciantelli
- Luciano Bartoli as young Henry IV
- Latou Chardons as young Matilda / Frida
