= Beware of a Holy Whore =

- Theatrical release poster
- Directed by: Rainer Werner Fassbinder
- Written by: Rainer Werner Fassbinder
- Cinematography: Michael Ballhaus
- Edited by: Thea Eymèsz; Franz Walsch
- Music by: Peer Raben
- Release dates: 28 August 1971 (Venice Film Festival); 1 September 1971 (West Germany)
- Running time: 103 minutes
- Country: West Germany
- Languages: German, English, French, Spanish

Beware of a Holy Whore (German: Warnung vor einer heiligen Nutte) is a 1971 West German drama film written and directed by Rainer Werner Fassbinder that features Lou Castel, Eddie Constantine, Hanna Schygulla and Fassbinder himself. Fassbinder considered this to be his favorite of his own films.

While in a hotel with too much drink, drugs and time, the cast and crew of a film are gradually unravelling as they await the arrival of their director. Semi-autobiographical, the film was influenced by the shooting of the director's earlier Whity in Spain. The film features music from Leonard Cohen's first album Songs of Leonard Cohen and from Spooky Two by Spooky Tooth, among others.

== Plot ==
Beware of a Holy Whore opens with a soliloquy (delivered by Werner Schroeter) about the synopsis of a Disney story featuring Goofy, the dog. Goofy cross-dresses in his aunt's clothes to teach a kindergarten class and, after being ridiculed by the class, takes a "poor orphan girl" into his home. The little girl is actually a dwarf gangster, Wee Willy, and he fools Goofy into caring for him by wearing the clothes that Goofy discarded after being ridiculed by the school children. That night Goofy's house is raided by police and Wee Willy is arrested, revealing the "poor orphan girl's" true identity to Goofy. When Willy's true identity is revealed the confused Goofy says, "What a shock that must have been for the poor little girl when she discovered that she is a crook". In both instances—attempting to teach the kindergarten class and caring for Wee Willy—Goofy is beaten by those for whom he only sought to care. This opening soliloquy alludes to the film's underlying themes of violence, self-blindness, and same-sex and bisexual relationships. The action of the movie then moves to a coastal hotel in Spain where the cast of the film's meta-film "Patria O Muerte" are waiting for production money and the director (Lou Castel) and the star (Eddie Constantine, as himself) to arrive. While waiting for everything the cast engages in sexual intrigues (both same-sex and opposite-sex), slander, and challenging power dynamics amongst themselves. The director then arrives by helicopter and inserts himself in the mix of cast interactions in a draconian manner, flaring the already discordant interactions among the cast. The remainder of the production depicts the mayhem of a movie production wrought with vicissitude and conflicting power dynamics. Fassbinder described the production as “a film about why living and working together as a group doesn’t function, even with people who want it to and for whom the group is life itself”.

== Cast ==
- Lou Castel as Jeff
- Eddie Constantine as himself
- Marquard Bohm as Ricky
- Hanna Schygulla as Hanna
- Rainer Werner Fassbinder as Sascha
- Margarethe von Trotta as Babs
- Hannes Fuchs as David
- Marcella Michelangeli as Margret
- Karl Scheydt as Manfred
- Ulli Lommel as Korbinian, manager
- Monica Teuber as Billi, makeup artist
- Magdalena Montezuma as Irm, Jeff's ex
- Werner Schroeter as Deiters
- Kurt Raab as Fred
