= Marcella Michelangeli =

Italian former actress and singer (born 1943)

- Born: Marcella Gherardi; 28 January 1943 (age 83); Uscio, Genoa, Kingdom of Italy
- Occupation: Actress

Marcella Michelangeli (born 28 January 1943) is an Italian former actress and singer.

== Biography ==
Born Marcella Gherardi in Uscio, Italy, she won several beauty contests at a young age, including Miss Liguria. While a student at the School of Fine Arts, she attended the drama school of the Piccolo Teatro Duse in Genoa and acted on stage with Dario Fo. In the second half of the 1960s she moved to Rome, where she briefly had a career as a pop singer, recording several singles with the stage name Marcella.

Michelangeli made her film debut in 1967, alternating art films and low profile genre works. She was also active on television, where she is probably best known for the role of Oriana Fallaci in the Giuseppe Ferrara's RAI TV-movie Panagulis Vive. After fifteen years of intense activity, she retired from showbusiness in the early 1980s.

She has a son with the actor Lou Castel.

== Filmography ==
Year	Title	Role	Notes
1967	Don Juan in Sicily	Ragazza alla festa	
1969	Let It All Hang Out	Luisa	
1969	Should a Schoolgirl Tell?	Vera Ricci	
1970	Una storia d'amore		
1970	And God Said to Cain	Maria	
1970	La lunga notte dei disertori - I 7 di Marsa Matruh	Dr. Martha Vaughan	
1970	Un caso di coscienza	Giuseppina	
1970	Arizona Colt Returns	Sheila	
1971	La casa delle mele mature	Marisa Cosentini	
1971	The Big Black Sow	Miriam Novelli	
1971	Beware of a Holy Whore	Margret	
1972	Si può fare molto con 7 donne	Danny	
1972	Il caso Pisciotta	Adelaide Scauri	
1974	Milarepa	Karin	
1974	We All Loved Each Other So Much	Gabriella	
1976	Down and Dirty	Impieg. Postale	
1976	Caro Michele	Viola Vivanti	
1976	The Big Racket	Marcy	
1976	Mark Strikes Again	Olga Kube	
1977	Padre Padrone	Mother	
1977	In the Highest of Skies	Eugenia	
1977	Could It Happen Here?	Mara	
1980	Immacolata and Concetta: The Other Jealousy	Concetta	
