= 35th Venice International Film Festival =

1976 Italian film festival

- Location: Venice, Italy
- Founded: 1932
- Festival date: 24 August – 7 September 1976
- Website: Website

Venice Film Festival chronology
- 36th 34th

The 35th annual Venice International Film Festival was held from 24 August to 7 September 1976.

There was no jury because from 1969 to 1979 the festival was not competitive.

== Official Selection ==
The following films were selected to be screened:

=== New Films Proposals ===
English title	Original title	Director(s)	Production country
1900	Novecento	Bernardo Bertolucci	Italy, France, West Germany
Gli altri		Marisa Malfatti, Riccardo Tortora	Italy
Arte del pueblo		Oscar Valdés	Cuba
A Bag of Marbles	Un sac de billes	Jacques Doillon	France
Baks		Momar Thiam	Senegal
Bandidos como Jesus		Grupo Cine de la Base	Argentina
Beyond the Bridge	Dincolo de pod	Mircea Veroiu	Romania
Los Cachorros		Jorge Fons	Mexico
Cantata de Chile		Humberto Solás	Cuba
Cataloghi		Yervant Gianikian, Angela Ricci Lucchi	Italy
Le cinque stagioni		Gianni Amico	Italy
Cronica de la victoria		Jesús Díaz, Fernando Pérez	Cuba
Dokkoi! Songs from the Bottom	どっこい！ 人間節 寿・自由労働者の街	Tadashi Hara, Yuji Okumura, Takaoki Watanabe, Marco Yumoto	Japan
La ETA		Jorge Fons	Mexico
Faith, Hope and Charity	Fe, esperanza y caridad	Luis Alcoriza, Alberto Bojórquez, Jorge Fons	Mexico
A Foolproof System	Ein todsicheres System	Carlo Di Carlo	West Germany
How Yukong Moved the Mountains	Comment Yukong déplaça les montagnes	Joris Ivens, Marceline Loridan	France
I Am Pierre Riviere	Je suis Pierre Rivière	Christine Lipinska	France
In the Highest of Skies	Nel più alto dei cieli	Silvano Agosti	Italy
A járvány		Pál Gábor	Hungary
The Judge and the Assassin	Le juge et l'assassin	Bertrand Tavernier	France
The Last Woman	La Dernière femme	Marco Ferreri	France, Italy
Lovin' Molly		Sidney Lumet	United States
Maladie mortelle		François Weyergans	France
Mella		Enrique Pineda Barnet	Cuba
Murder by Death		Robert Moore	United States
Nel cerchio		Gianni Minello	Italy
Nosotros		Jorge Fons	Mexico
Ode to Billy Joe		Max Baer Jr.	United States
One People	Wan Pipel	Pim de la Parra	Netherlands, Suriname
The Only One	Единственная...	Iosif Kheifits	Soviet Union
Origins of the Mafia	Alle origini della mafia	Enzo Muzii	Italy, United Kingdom
Partita for a Wooden Instrument	Partita na instrument drewniany	Janusz Zaorski	Poland
Der Prototyp		Sven Severin	West Germany
Smile		Michael Ritchie	United States
Stay Hungry		Bob Rafelson	United States
Walanda		Alkaly Kaba	Mali
Wamba		Alkaly Kaba	Mali
Zenšina sostrova Kišnu	Кихну наине	Mark Soosaar	Soviet Union, Estonia
