= La colpa e la pena =

- Directed by: Marco Bellocchio
- Release date: 1961
- Country: Italy
- Language: Italian

La colpa e la pena is a 1961 Italian short film directed by Marco Bellocchio. The screenplay and story were written by Bellocchio.

== Cast ==
Maria Pia Conte, Alberto Maravalle and Stefano Satta
