= Blessed Boys =

2021 drama film

- Directed by: Silvia Brunelli
- Screenplay by: Silvia Brunelli; Francesca Scanu
- Starring: Francesco Pellegrino
- Cinematography: Sammy Paravan
- Edited by: Luna Gualano; Silvia Brunelli
- Music by: Emiliano Rubbi; Eugenio Vicedomini
- Release date: 2021
- Language: Italian

Blessed Boys (Italian: La santa piccola, also known as The Miracle Child) is a 2021 Italian drama film co-written and directed by Silvia Brunelli, in her feature film debut.

The film premiered in the Biennale College - Cinema sidebar at the 78th edition of the Venice Film Festival. It was screened at the 2022 Tribeca Festival. It was awarded the Jury Award for best feature film at the Rome Independent Film Festival.

== Plot ==
In a lively neighborhood in Naples, where everyone knows each other, Mario and Lino, two inseparable friends, lead a routine life marked by the everyday life of the neighborhood. But an unexpected twist changes everything: Annaluce, Lino's younger sister, begins to perform miracles and becomes the revered figure of the community. For both of them, this represents a turning point, a door to an unknown universe that will lead them down different paths, putting everything at stake, even the most valuable thing they share: their deep friendship.

== Cast ==
- Francesco Pellegrino as Lino
- Vincenzo Antonucci as Mario
- Sophia Guastaferro as Annaluce
- Pina Di Gennaro as Perla
- Alessandra Mantice as Assia
- Gianfelice Imparato as Don Gennaro
- Carlo Gertrude as Marcello
- Sara Ricci as Marina
