= My Mother's Smile =

- Directed by: Marco Bellocchio
- Written by: Marco Bellocchio
- Starring: Sergio Castellitto; Jacqueline Lustig; Chiara Conti; Gigio Alberti; Alberto Mondini; Gianfelice Imparato; Piera Degli Esposti; Toni Bertorelli
- Cinematography: Pasquale Mari
- Edited by: Francesca Calvelli
- Music by: Riccardo Giagni
- Release date: 19 April 2002
- Running time: 103 minutes
- Country: Italy
- Language: Italian

My Mother's Smile is a 2002 Italian drama film directed by Marco Bellocchio. The original Italian title is L'ora di religione (Il sorriso di mia madre) ("The Hour of Religion (My Mother's Smile)").

== Plot ==
Ernesto Picciafuoco, painter and illustrator of children's tales, is a part of a very important but impoverished family, which wants to regain its stature by having a member canonized. The late mother of the protagonist seems to be the only true religious person in the weak and stupid family. Two of the young rebels are now in the 40s and are completely detached from the hypocrisy of religion. One of them pretends to be very religious, to get back his job. The other, the protagonist, is uncertain, beset by moral doubts, mainly because of his young son who could learn the hypocrisy from him. The film is a journey through the absurd and surreal episodes. Ernesto, the protagonist, is contacted by a mysterious cardinal who wants to question him about the process of sanctification of the mother, about which he knew nothing until then. Then the child goes to school for the hearings with teachers, where he meets a young and charming, "religious teacher", to whom he is attracted, but that will be an impossibility. He has a discussion with a religious man appointed to investigate circumstances of "martyrdom", which asks account the non-baptism of his son, showing that he is well informed about him and trying to know why Ernest had "lost faith". Ernesto is then challenged to a duel, for petty reasons, from a noble dream of an improbable restoration of the monarchy, but the duel is interrupted after a few seconds. He talks with his aunt, who has never shown much faith, but now, attracted by possible financial gain and popularity that the family would derive from sanctification, for a purely opportunistic attempt to bring her nephew on the "right path". Meanwhile, the wife of Ernesto administers a sort of baptism to the child sleeping, anxious to repair the previous "non-". Ernesto's aunt smiles cravingly while awaiting to be seen by his Holiness, with their familial collaborators, all but Ernesto, who prefers to walk with his child to school.

== Cast ==
- Sergio Castellitto - Ernesto Picciafuocco
- Jacqueline Lustig - Irene Picciafuocco
- Chiara Conti - Diana Sereni
- Gigio Alberti - Ettore Picciafuocco
- Alberto Mondini - Leonardo Picciafuocco
- Gianfelice Imparato - Erminio Picciafuocco
- Gianni Schicchi - Filippo Argenti (as Gianni Schicchi Gabrieli)
- Maurizio Donadoni - Cardinal Piumini
- Donato Placido - Egidio Picciafuocco
- Renzo Rossi - Baldracchi
- Pietro De Silva - Curzio Sandali
- Bruno Cariello - Don Pugni
- Piera Degli Esposti - Aunt Maria
- Toni Bertorelli - Count Ludovico Bulla
- Maria Luisa Bellocchio - Zia Ernesto

== Awards ==
- David di Donatello for Best Supporting Actress (Piera Degli Esposti)
- European Film Awards Best Actor (Sergio Castellitto)
- 4 Nastro d'Argento
- Prize of the Ecumenical Jury - Special Mention at the 2002 Cannes Film Festival
