= Fists in the Pocket =

1965 Italian film

- Theatrical release poster
- Italian: I pugni in tasca
- Directed by: Marco Bellocchio
- Written by: Marco Bellocchio
- Produced by: Enzo Doria
- Starring: Lou Castel; Paola Pitagora; Marino Masé; Liliana Gerace; Pier Luigi Troglio; Jeannie McNeil
- Cinematography: Alberto Marrama
- Edited by: Silvano Agosti (as Aurelio Mangiarotti)
- Music by: Ennio Morricone
- Production company: Doria Cinematografica
- Distributed by: International Film Company (1965)
- Release date: October 1965 (Italy)
- Running time: 109 minutes (Note: Film length according to the pressbook published by Cineteca di Bologna/L'Immagine Ritrovata and the running time of the 2005 DVD Edition by The Criterion Collection. The 2019 Criterion Collection Blu-ray runs 110 minutes and includes a 60 second pre-title sequence which informs the viewer on the film's 2015 restoration.)
- Country: Italy
- Language: Italian
- Budget: 20–24 million lire

Fists in the Pocket (Italian: I pugni in tasca) is a 1965 Italian satirical drama film written and directed by Marco Bellocchio and starring Lou Castel. It was Bellocchio's first feature film and became one of the most critically acclaimed films of the year. The film centers on a young man suffering from epilepsy, who plots the murders of the members of his dysfunctional family.

In 2008, Fists in the Pocket was included in the Italian Ministry of Cultural Heritage's 100 Italian films to be saved, a list of 100 films that "have changed the collective memory of the country between 1942 and 1978."

== Plot ==
Four siblings, a sister and three brothers, live with their blind, widowed mother in a provincial villa. The younger brothers Alessandro and Leone are epileptics, while sister Giulia, with whom Alessandro shares an incestuous attraction, is mentally disturbed. Augusto, the eldest brother and apparently sane, is the family's only provider. When Augusto's fiancée Lucia receives an anonymous letter whose addressor pretends to be pregnant by him, he immediately realizes that it was written by Giulia. Alessandro, who is disgusted with his family, decides that Augusto would be free to live with Lucia if the mother and other siblings were gotten rid of, while at the same time begrudging his older brother's dominant position.

Alessandro connives to be allowed to drive his mother, Leone and Giulia on their periodic trip to a cemetery, pretending that he passed his driving test which he actually failed. After he has left, Augusto reads a note by Alessandro saying that he would kill all of them and himself. Due to a confrontation with another driver, which, cheered on by Giulia, leads to a car race, he lets go of his plan, and they all return home safely, where Augusto slaps Alessandro. Some time later, Alessandro takes his mother for a drive. They stop at an overlook, and Alessandro pushes his mother off the cliff to her death. During the wake, he confesses his crime to Giulia, but his sister does not give him away.

After the mother's funeral, Alessandro kills Leone by giving him an overdose of his medication and drowning him in the bathtub. Giulia realizes that Alessandro killed Leone and, in a state of shock, falls down the stairs, which leaves her bed-ridden. Alessandro tries to suffocate the sleeping Giulia with a pillow, but is unable to do so. He falls into another epileptic fit and dies, witnessed by his sister who does not intervene.

== Cast ==
- Lou Castel as Alessandro
- Paola Pitagora as Giulia
- Marino Masè as Augusto
- Liliana Gerace as the mother
- Pier Luigi Troglio as Leone
- Jeannie MacNeil as Lucia
- Irene Agnelli as the prostitute
- Celestina Bellocchio as the girl at the party
- Stefania Troglio as the housemaid
- Gianni Schicchi as Tonino

== Production ==
Bellocchio had based his script for Fists in the Pocket (originally titled "Epilepsy" before finally taking its name from a poem by Arthur Rimbaud) partially on his own biography. After repeated rejections by producers, among them Tullio Kezich of film company 22 dicembre, the film was produced by the small independent company Doria Cinematografica and financed with the help of Bellocchio's brothers, who acted as guarantors for a bank loan of 20 million lire. Filming took place in Piacenza and around Imola, including the villa of Bellocchio's mother. Due to the tight budget, the director had to give up his original plan to cast Maurice Ronet as Augusto and Susan Strasberg as Giulia, working with a cast of then unknown actors instead. (Singer Gianni Morandi, who had at one point expressed his interest to play the part of Alessandro, was hindered by his record company to do so.) Young Swedish actor Lou Castel, whom Bellocchio had met at the Centro Sperimentale di Cinematografia and who eventually took the part of Alessandro, had his voice dubbed by Paolo Carlini. Ennio Morricone, who, in his words, found in Bellocchio an "urge to experiment" which he owned himself, agreed to compose the film's score.

== Reception ==
Fists in the Pocket was denied a screening at the Venice Film Festival and premiered at the July 1965 Locarno Film Festival, where it was awarded the Silver Sail. While mostly well received by critics, the film was attacked by members of the Christian Democracy party for its portrayal of the family and dismissed by directors Luis Buñuel and Michelangelo Antonioni, two of Bellocchio's favourite filmmakers. On the other hand, director and writer Pier Paolo Pasolini expressed his respect in a letter to Bellocchio, calling his film a representative of a "cinema of prose" in which content prevails instead of style, and one which had gone beyond Italian neorealism.

Upon its initial release, reviewers called Fists in the Pocket a "diabolical and unpleasant" film whose strength was being "unconventional and free" (Piacenza Oggi), "a work which stands on it own", turning naturalism into a "stylistic tour de force" (Italo Calvino, Rinascita), and Bellocchio "most likely a director of the first rank" (Mario Soldati, Il Giorno). When shown in the US three years later, Maurice Rapf of Life magazine titled it a "brilliant, sinister-sweet first film", drawing parallels to The Little Foxes, and Pauline Kael of The New Yorker spoke of "surely one of the most astonishing directorial debuts in the history of movies".

In later years, critics and film historians read Fists in the Pocket as a Free Cinema inspired break with filmic or neorealist tradition and, in its protagonist's revolt against the family, as an artistic precursor of the protests of 1968.

== Awards ==
- Locarno Film Festival 1965 Silver Sail
- Nastro d'Argento 1966 for Best Original Story
- Cahiers du Cinéma's Annual Top 10 Lists 10th place in 1966

== Restoration ==
The film underwent a 4K restoration by the Cineteca di Bologna's L'Immagine Ritrovata laboratory, which was completed in 2015. The restoration was funded by the Cineteca di Bologna, Armani, and Kavac Film, and supervised by Bellocchio.
