= Difunta Correa =

Semi-legendary character

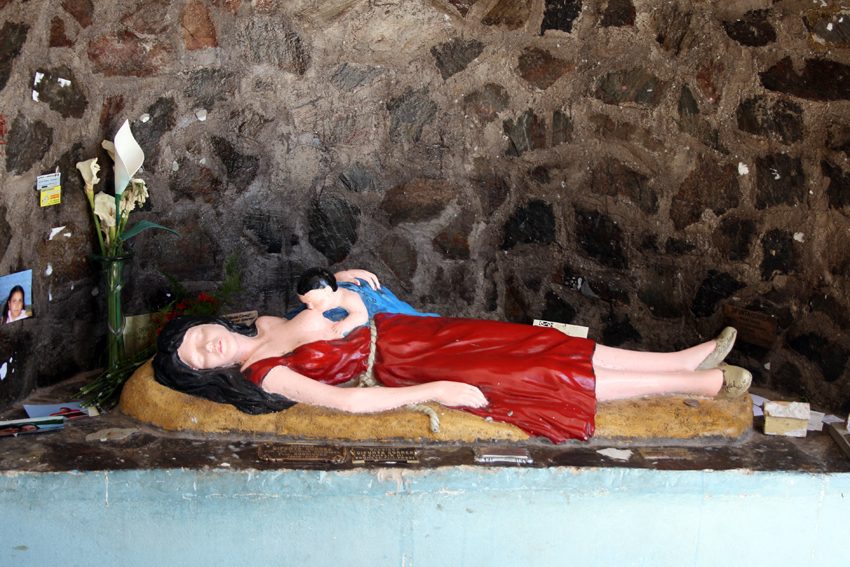
- Statue of Difunta Correa at Vallecito
- Died: 1840s San Juan Province, Argentina
- Venerated in: Folk Catholicism
- Major shrine: Vallecito, Argentina
- Feast: Easter, 2 November
- Attributes: Woman with baby
- Patronage: Cattle herders, ranchers, truck drivers, gauchos

The Deceased Correa (Spanish: La Difunta Correa) is a semi-pagan legendary figure in folk Catholicism in Argentina and Chile, whose devotees come from the popular classes. The legend has spread in a limited way to neighbouring countries such as Uruguay. Every year since its origins in 1840, miracles are said to have occurred at the shrine of La Difunta Correa, which has become a pilgrimage site. The shrine is situated in the small town of Vallecito, 63 km from the city of San Juan.

== Origins ==
According to popular legend, the husband of Deolinda Correa was forcibly recruited around the year 1840, during the Argentine Civil Wars. When he became sick, he was abandoned by the Montoneras (partisans). In an attempt to reach her sick husband, Deolinda took her baby and followed the tracks of the Montoneras through the desert of San Juan Province. When her supplies ran out, she died. Her body was found days later by gauchos who were driving cattle through. They were astonished when they saw the dead woman's baby was still alive, feeding from her "miraculously" ever-full breast. The men buried her body in present-day Vallecito in the Caucete Department of San Juan, and took her baby with them.

Although the Church—and in particular the Archdiocese of San Juan—has long viewed the popular cult of the Difunta Correa with suspicion, it recently announced in May 2026 that, in collaboration with the Héctor Domingo Arias Institute of Regional and Argentine History, which is part of the Faculty of Philosophy at the National University of San Juan (NUSJ), they have launched an investigation to determine whether this popular figure actually existed.

The primary objective of both the Church and the National University of San Juan is to determine, by cross-referencing reliable documentary sources, the historical veracity of the myth of Deolinda Correa and to subject this myth—which has been rooted in the region’s oral tradition for over a century and draws millions of faithful to her shrine in Vallecito—to scientific and religious scrutiny.

Oral tradition holds that the child who miraculously survived his mother was named Baudilio Bustos Correa. During their research, historians found an 1865 advertisement in the newspaper El Zonda in which a man named Baudilio Bustos Correa, who lived near Plaza 25 de Mayo in the capital of San Juan, was selling a property before moving to Córdoba. Researchers are attempting to determine whether this is indeed the son of the popular figure and, in doing so, to identify descendants who can provide information that brings them closer to the truth and thus confirms that the Difunta Correa truly existed.

== Shrine ==
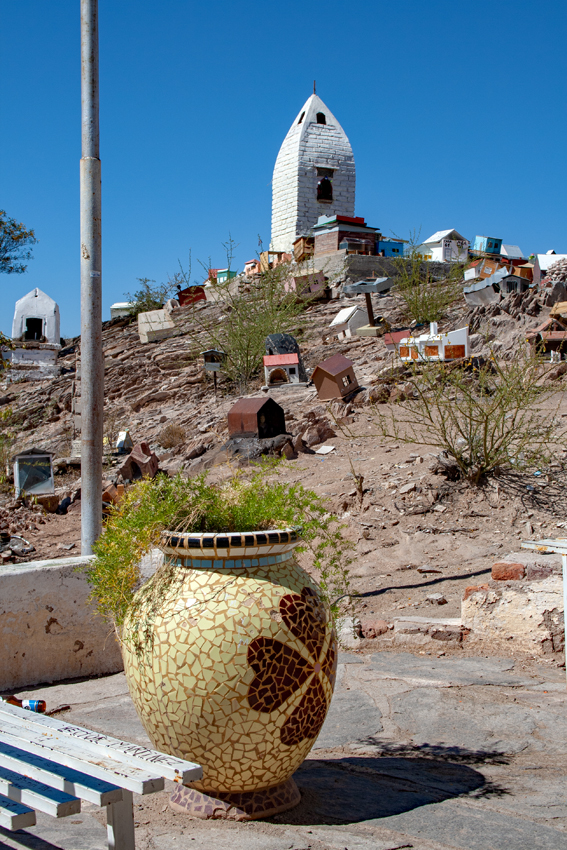
Votive chapel to Difunta Correa at Vallecito

Once the folk tale became popular, inhabitants of nearby areas started visiting Deolinda Correa's grave, building an oratory that slowly became a shrine.

The cultus to the Difunta Correa is that of a folk saint not recognised by the Catholic Church. Her devout followers believe she performs miracles and intercedes for the living, with the survival of her child counted as her first miracle.

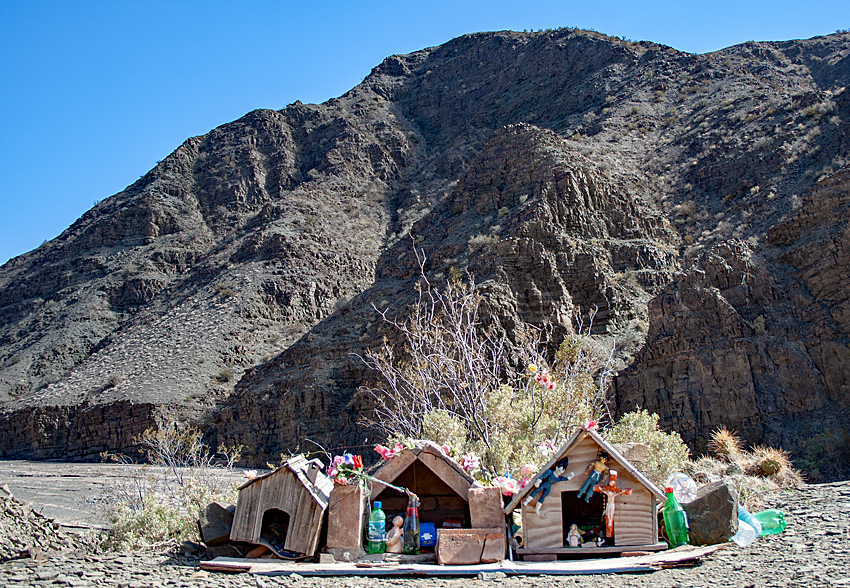
Roadside shrine in the Andes to Difunta Corea

Cattle keepers first, then truck drivers, disseminated the figure of the Difunta, creating wayside shrines in many roads throughout the country, with images and sculptures of her. A common votive offering is bottles of water "to calm her eternal thirst".

Since the 1940s, her shrine at Vallecito grew from a hilltop cross into a small town with a network of votive chapels (17 as of 2005), full of offerings. The chapels are donated by her followers as ex votos, their names engraved on plates fixed to the doors.

In the chapel located on the top of the hill is a life-size statue depicting the Difunta lying on her back, facing the heavens and with her child at her breast. The other shrines are segregated by theme: one chapel is full of wedding dresses offered to the Difunta by women whose prayers for marriage were fulfilled. Car registrations and scale-model houses can be found all around the hill leading to the main shrine.

Visits to the Vallecito shrine take place during the whole year, with the biggest during Easter and at All-Souls' Day (2 November), and on dates special to truck drivers and gauchos mostly in summer. On such occasions, crowds of 200,000 people have been claimed.

== See also ==
- Religion in Argentina § Popular cults
- Miguel Ángel Gaitán
