= Miguel Ángel Gaitán =

The Miraculous Child, The Miraculous Angel
- Born: 9 July 1966; Villa Unión, Argentina
- Died: 24 June 1967 (age 11 months); Argentina
- Venerated in: Folk Catholicism

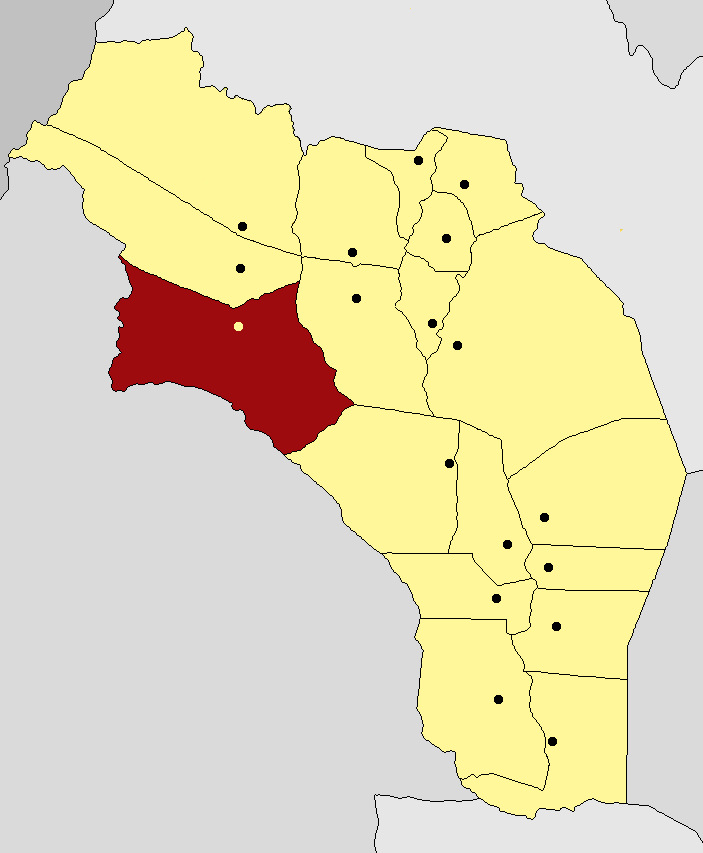
Location of Villa Unión in La Rioja

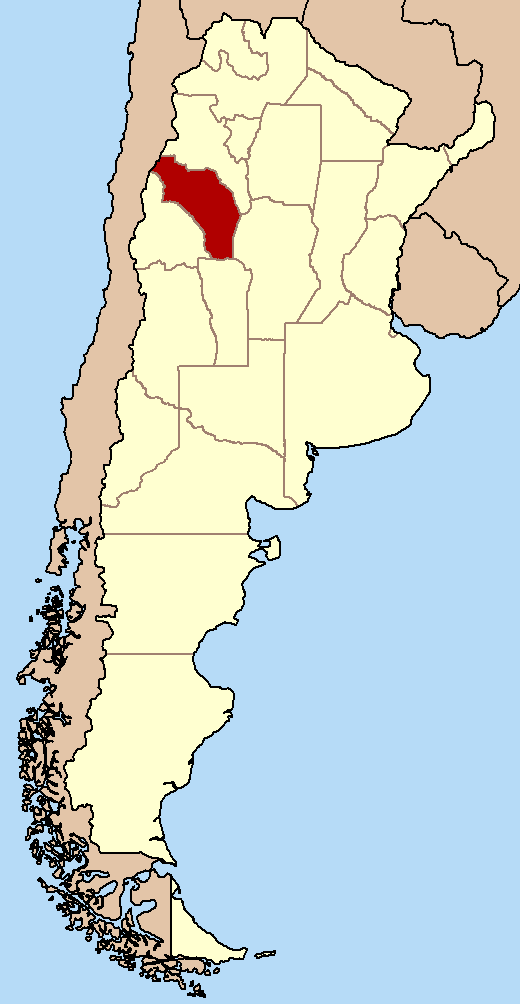
Location of La Rioja in Argentina

Miguel Ángel Gaitán (July 9, 1966 – June 24, 1967), also known as El Angelito Milagroso (Spanish for "Miracle Child" — "angelito", which is a diminutive for ángel (angel), is a reference to his name) was an Argentine baby who died of meningitis, at age 11 months.

== History ==
=== Life ===
Miguelito was born in Banda Florida, on the banks of the Bermejo River, in Villa Unión, head of the Coronel Felipe Varela department of the province of La Rioja, Argentina. He was the 12th son from Argentina Nery Olguín and Barnabas Gaitán (which had fifteen children, but only nine survived). Miguelito died on June 24, 1967, when he was urgently transported by an ambulance to Chilecito.

=== Popular belief as a saint ===
His corpse remained remarkably well-preserved, as was discovered after a violent rainstorm in 1973, seven years after his death, which unearthed the baby's coffin. After four attempts to build tombs to shelter the coffin, which kept appearing collapsed the next day, the locals decided to keep the coffin out in the open. But then the coffin's lid kept being removed, and presuming those to be signs that he didn't want to be hidden, but rather seen by the people, his mother finally transferred the body to a coffin with a glass lid, on which he has stayed to the present day, revered by people from all Argentina which recurred to him for miracles as a folk saint. He eventually gained international fame, being covered by several newspapers, most notably the New York Times.

== See also ==
- Religion in Argentina#Popular cults
- Difunta Correa
