= Marco Bellocchio =

Italian film director, screenwriter and actor

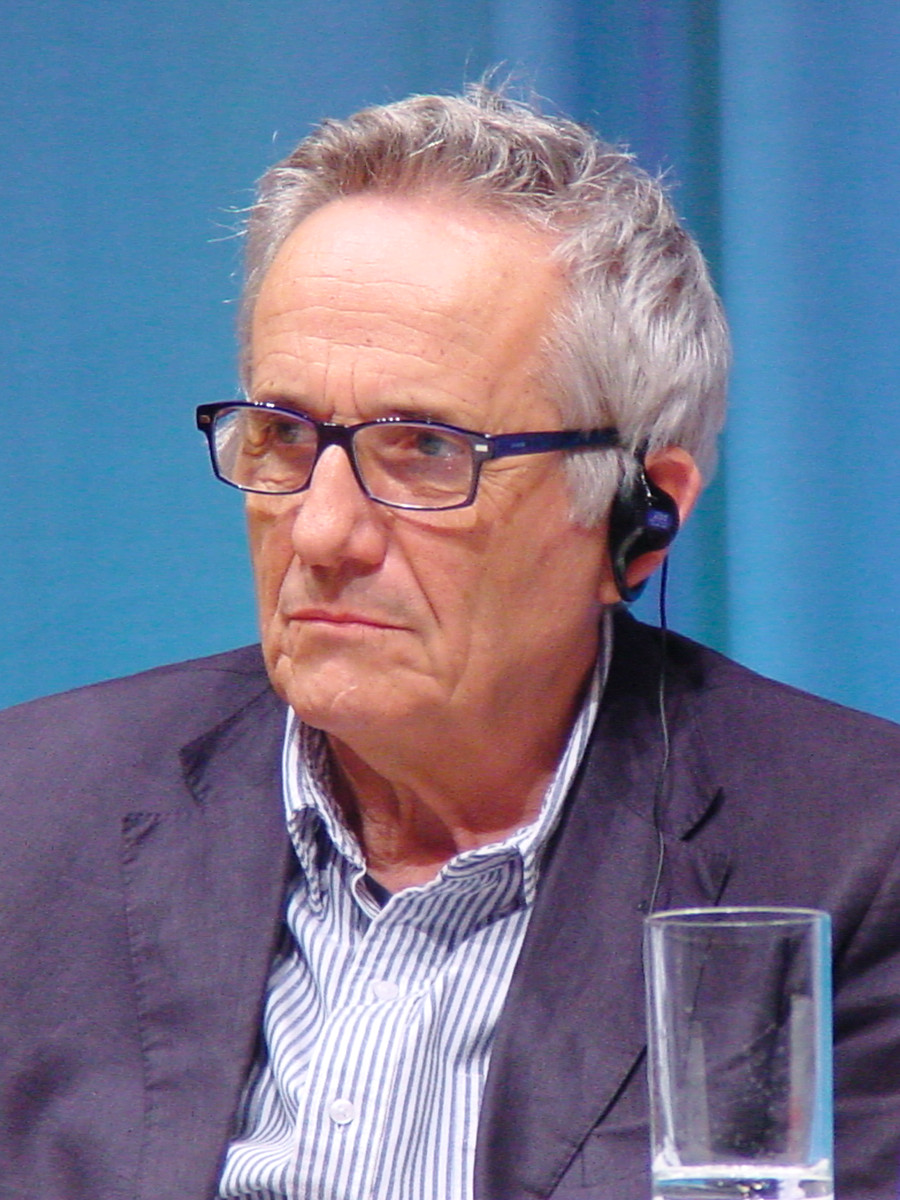
- Bellocchio in 2010
- Born: 9 November 1939 (age 86); Bobbio, Italy
- Occupations: Film director, screenwriter, actor
- Years active: 1962–present

Marco Bellocchio (Italian: [ˈmarko belˈlɔkkjo]; born 9 November 1939) is an Italian film director, screenwriter, and actor. His is most known for his films Fists in the Pocket (1965), Slap the Monster on Page One (1972), A Leap in the Dark (1980), Good Morning, Night (2003), The Traitor (2019) and Kidnapped (2023).

== Life and career ==
Born in Bobbio, near Piacenza, Marco Bellocchio had a strict Catholic upbringing – his father was a lawyer, his mother a schoolteacher. He began studying philosophy in Milan but then decided to enter film school, first at the Dramatic Art Academy of Milan, then the Centro Sperimentale di Cinematografia in Rome, and later at the Slade School of Fine Art in London. His first film, Fists in the Pocket (I pugni in tasca, winner of the Silver Sail at the 1965 Festival del film Locarno), was funded by family members and shot on family property in 1965.

=== Films ===
Bellocchio's films include China Is Near (1967), Slap the Monster on Page One (1972), Nel Nome del Padre (In the name of the Father – a 1972 satire on a Catholic boarding school that shares affinities with Lindsay Anderson's If....), Victory March (1976), A Leap in the Dark (1980), Henry IV (1984), Devil in the Flesh (1986), and My Mother's Smile (2002), which told the story of a wealthy Italian artist, a 'default-Marxist and atheist', who suddenly discovers that the Vatican is proposing to make his detested mother a saint.

In 1991, he won the Silver Bear – Special Jury Prize at the 41st Berlin International Film Festival for his film The Conviction.

In 1995, he directed a documentary about the Red Brigades and the kidnapping and murder of Aldo Moro, titled Broken Dreams. In 2003, he directed a feature film on the same theme, Good Morning, Night. In 2006, his film The Wedding Director was screened in the Un Certain Regard section at the 2006 Cannes Film Festival. In 1999, he was awarded with an Honorable Prize for the contribution to cinema at the 21st Moscow International Film Festival.

In 2009, he directed Vincere, which was in the main competition at the Cannes Film Festival. He finished Sorelle Mai, an experimental film that was shot over ten years with the students of six separate workshops playing themselves. He was awarded with the Golden Lion for Lifetime Achievement at the 68th Venice International Film Festival in September 2011.

His 2012 film Dormant Beauty was selected to compete for the Golden Lion at the 69th Venice International Film Festival. On 6 September 2012, Bellocchio condemned the Catholic Church's interference in politics after the premiere of his controversial film about a high-profile euthanasia case. The film approaches the topic of euthanasia and the difficulty with legislation on end of life in Italy, which has Vatican City within its borders. The subject is inspired by Eluana Englaro's case. Following the decision of the jury of the Venice Film Festival, which excluded the film from the Golden Lion, Bellocchio has expressed strong criticism against President Michael Mann.

=== Political activity ===
Bellocchio made a big impact on radical Italian cinema in the mid-1960s, and was a friend of Pasolini. In 1968, he joined the Union of Italian Communists (Marxist-Leninist), a Maoist group, and began to make politically militant cinema. However, in a 2002 interview, he talked about divided state of the Italian left, politics' lacking from the aim of radical change, and how such a radical change not being appealing for him anymore:

"I can talk about my personal ideas but Marxism has little to do with it now. Today politics means administration, either a good or a bad administration, and nobody is talking any more in terms of changing things. The left in Italy is now very divided, as if it doesn't have the strength to form an opposition. No party is now proposing a radical change of anything, and radical change is no longer very interesting to me as an artist."

In another interview conducted in London Film Festival of 2006, he insisted still being a leftist, but argued for a need to reinvent the term:

In Italy politics is pretty mediocre and depressing. It is not the same situation as in the 60s when you had the idea to change the society through politics that doesn't exist anymore. It is not necessarily to make Italy into socialist republic but in any case to change a few things radically. Because in Italy like the rest of Europe politics now is more based on running a public administration and so there is not a big difference between left and right. [...] I am still on the left but socialism and the left should be reinvented. It is difficult. Basically old values are invalid anymore and we have to find new ones."

He was candidate for Italian Parliament in 2006, with Rose in the Fist list, a political cartel made by socialists and Italian Radicals (a liberal, social liberal and libertarian party).

== Personal life ==
Bellocchio is an atheist. He is the third son in his family along with his twin brother Camillo, who committed suicide in 1969 leaving an lasting impact on Bellocchio's life. He has three children including a son Pier Giorgio Bellocchio with actress Gisella Burinato and a daughter Elena with his current partner Francesca Calvelli who is also the editor for his films.

== Filmography ==
=== Feature films ===
| Year | English title | Original title | Notes |
|---|---|---|---|
| 1965 | Fists in the Pocket | I pugni in tasca | |
| 1967 | China Is Near | La Cina è vicina | |
| 1972 | Slap the Monster on Page One | Sbatti il mostro in prima pagina | |
| 1976 | Victory March | Marcia trionfale | |
| 1977 | The Seagull | Il gabbiano | |
| 1980 | A Leap in the Dark | Salto nel vuoto | |
| 1982 | The Eyes, the Mouth | Gli occhi, la bocca | |
| 1984 | Henry IV | Enrico IV | |
| 1986 | Devil in the Flesh | Il diavolo in corpo | |
| 1988 | The Witches' Sabbath | La visione del sabba | |
| 1991 | The Conviction | La condanna | Silver Bear Special Jury Prize |
| 1994 | The Butterfly's Dream | Il sogno della farfalla | |
| 1996 | The Prince of Homburg | Il principe di Homburg | |
| 1999 | The Nanny | La balia | |
| 2002 | My Mother's Smile | L'ora di religione (Il sorriso di mia madre) | |
| 2003 | Good Morning, Night | Buongiorno, notte | |
| 2006 | The Wedding Director | Il regista di matrimoni | |
| 2009 | Vincere | | |
| 2012 | Dormant Beauty | Bella addormentata | |
| 2015 | Blood of My Blood | Sangue del mio sangue | |
| 2016 | Sweet Dreams | Fai bei sogni | |
| 2019 | The Traitor | Il traditore | |
| 2023 | Kidnapped | Rapito | |

=== Television ===
| Year | English title | Original title | Notes |
|---|---|---|---|
| 2022 | Exterior Night | Esterno notte | 6 episodes miniseries |
| 2026 | Portobello | | 6 episodes miniseries |

=== Documentaries ===
| Year | English title | Original title | Notes |
|---|---|---|---|
| 1969 | Il popolo calabrese ha rialzato la testa | | Co-directed with |
| 1969 | Viva il 1º maggio rosso proletario | | Co-directed with |
| 1975 | Fit to Be Untied | Matti da slegare | co-directed with Silvano Agosti, Sandro Petraglia, Stefano Rulli |
| 1979 | The Cinema Machine | La macchina cinema | co-directed with Silvano Agosti, Sandro Petraglia, Stefano Rulli |
| 1980 | Vacation in Val Trebbia | Vacanze in Val Trebbia | |
| 2002 | Farewell to the Past | Addio del passato | |
| 2002 | La primavera del 2002 - L'Italia protesta, l'Italia si ferma | | |
| 2002 | Appunti per un film su Zio Vanja | | |
| 2021 | Marx Can Wait | Marx può aspettare | |

=== Short films ===
- La colpa e la pena (1961)
- La colpa e la pena (1961)
- Ginepro fatto uomo (1962)
- L'uomo dal fiore in bocca (1993)
- Elena (1997)
- Nina (1999)
- L'affresco (2000)
- Un filo di passione (2000)
- Il maestro di coro (2001)
- Oggi è una bella giornata (2002)
- Pagliacci (2016)
- Per una rosa (2017)
- La lotta (2018)
- Se posso permettermi (2021)
- Se posso permettermi - Capitolo II (2024)

=== Only Writer ===
- Abbasso il zio (1961)
- Il ginepro fatto uomo (1962)
- Discutiamo, discutiamo, episode of Love and Anger (1969) – co-direction
- Nel nome del padre (1972)
- Sogni infranti (1995) – TV documentary
- La religione della storia (1998) – TV documentary
- L'affresco (2000)
- Elena (2002)
- Sorelle (2006)
- Sorelle Mai (2010)
- The Life Apart (2024)

=== Actor ===
- Francesco di Assisi (1966) – Pietro
- Love and Anger (1969) - Lecturer (segment "Discutiamo discutiamo")
- N.P. (1971) - Preacher (voice)
- Pianeta Venere (1972)
- The Canterbury Tales (1972) - voice of the greedy friar in the Summoner's Tale
- Slap the Monster on Page One (1972) - Giornalista Conferenza (uncredited)
- Tutto in comune (1974)
- Salò, or the 120 Days of Sodom (1975) - The President (voice, uncredited)
- Il gabbiano (1977) - Servant (uncredited)
- Vacanze in Val Trebbia (1980) - Il marito
- L'ora di religione (Il sorriso di mia madre) (2002)

== Awards and nominations ==
Awards and nominations received by Marco Bellocchio
| Award | Year | Work | Category | Result |
|---|---|---|---|---|
| Cannes Film Festival | 2021 | | Honorary Palme d'Or | Won |
| Berlin International Film Festival | 1991 | The Conviction | Silver Bear Grand Jury Prize | Won |
| Venice Film Festival | 2011 | | Golden Lion for Lifetime Achievement | Won |
| David di Donatello | 1980 | A Leap in the Dark | Best Director | Won |
| David di Donatello | 2003 | My Mother's Smile | Best Director | Nominated |
| David di Donatello | 2004 | Good Morning, Night | Best Director | Nominated |
| David di Donatello | 2007 | The Wedding Director | Best Director | Nominated |
| David di Donatello | 2010 | Vincere | Best Director | Won |
| David di Donatello | 2011 | Sorelle Mai | Best Director | Nominated |
| David di Donatello | 2017 | Sweet Dreams | Best Director | Nominated |
| David di Donatello | 2020 | The Traitor | Best Director | Won |
| David di Donatello | 2023 | Exterior Night | Best Director | Won |
| David di Donatello | 2024 | Kidnapped | Best Director | Nominated |
| David di Donatello | 2003 | My Mother's Smile | Best Screenplay | Nominated |
| David di Donatello | 2004 | Good Morning, Night | Best Screenplay | Nominated |
| David di Donatello | 2010 | Vincere | Best Screenplay | Nominated |
| David di Donatello | 2017 | Sweet Dreams | Best Screenplay | Nominated |
| David di Donatello | 2020 | The Traitor | Best Screenplay | Won |
| David di Donatello | 2023 | Exterior Night | Best Screenplay | Nominated |
| David di Donatello | 2024 | Kidnapped | Best Screenplay | Nominated |
| David di Donatello | 2014 | | Lifetime Achievement Award | Won |
Nastro d'Argento
| Nastro d'Argento | 1966 | Fists in the Pocket | Best Director | Nominated |
| Nastro d'Argento | 2003 | My Mother's Smile | Best Director | Won |
| Nastro d'Argento | 2004 | Good Morning, Night | Best Director | Nominated |
| Nastro d'Argento | 2007 | The Wedding Director | Best Director | Nominated |
| Nastro d'Argento | 2009 | Vincere | Best Director | Nominated |
| Nastro d'Argento | 2011 | Sorelle mai | Best Director | Nominated |
| Nastro d'Argento | 2013 | Dormant Beauty | Best Director | Nominated |
| Nastro d'Argento | 2017 | Sweet Dreams | Best Director | Nominated |
| Nastro d'Argento | 2019 | The Traitor | Best Director | Won |
| Nastro d'Argento | 2023 | Kidnapped | Best Director | Won |
| Nastro d'Argento | 1966 | Fists in the Pocket | Best Story | Won |
| Nastro d'Argento | 1968 | China Is Near | Best Story | Won |
| Nastro d'Argento | 1976 | Victory March | Best Story | Nominated |
| Nastro d'Argento | 2002 | My Mother's Smile | Best Story | Won |
| Nastro d'Argento | 2007 | The Wedding Director | Best Story | Won |
| Nastro d'Argento | 1966 | Fists in the Pocket | Best Screenplay | Nominated |
| Nastro d'Argento | 1968 | China Is Near | Best Screenplay | Nominated |
| Nastro d'Argento | 1998 | The Prince of Homburg | Best Screenplay | Nominated |
| Nastro d'Argento | 2002 | My Mother's Smile | Best Screenplay | Nominated |
| Nastro d'Argento | 2004 | Good Morning, Night | Best Screenplay | Nominated |
| Nastro d'Argento | 2013 | Dormant Beauty | Best Screenplay | Nominated |
| Nastro d'Argento | 2019 | The Traitor | Best Screenplay | Won |
| Nastro d'Argento | 2023 | Kidnapped | Best Screenplay | Won |
