= Massimo Pirri =

Italian film director and screenwriter

- Born: 10 November 1945; Campagnano di Roma
- Died: 20 June 2001 (aged 55); Rome
- Occupations: film director, screenwriter

Massimo Pirri (10 November 1945 – 20 June 2001) was an Italian film director and screenwriter.

== Life and career ==
Born in Campagnano di Roma, Pirri entered the cinema industry as an actor, playing very minor roles while he was completing his engineering degree, and then he worked as an assistant director of Luciano Emmer and Folco Quilici. In 1972 he made his directorial debut with the documentary film La mattanza, which was followed by several other documentaries. In 1975 he directed the first of his five feature films, Calamo, the provocative story of a rebellious seminarist who is discovering sex. In 1977 he directed his most known film, Italia: Ultimo atto?, one of the first with the links of Italian terrorists and the police apparatus, and one year later he directed the controversial L'immoralità, the unusual story of a young girl in love with a serial killer. His last project, the short documentary Il mestiere dello sceneggiatore, was made in collaboration with the screenwriter Tonino Guerra and was screened at the Venice Film Festival. In his last years he worked on religious-themed stories.

== Filmography ==
- Calamo (1976)
- Italia: ultimo atto? (1977)
- L'immoralità (1978) a.k.a. Cock Crows at Eleven
- Eroina (1980)
- Meglio baciare un cobra (1986)
