= Giovanni Battista Martinetti =

Italian architect, and engineer (1764 – 1829)

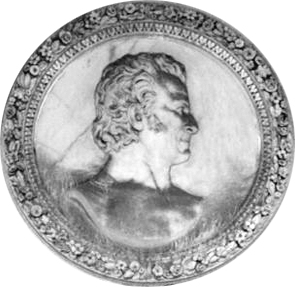

Giovanni Battista Martinetti (1764–1829) was an Italian architect and engineer, principally active in Bologna.

== Life ==
Born at Bironico in 1764, he moved to Bologna at the age of 11 years, and came under the patronage of the Marquis Zambeccari. He later was appointed architect for the commune, and later papa inspector of engineering. Among his architectural designs were the Collegio Montalto; the Villa Ravona, erected for the Marquis Zambeccari; and Villa Spada. His wife, the countess Cornelia Rossi Martinetti, was known for her salons in Bologna. Giovanni helped design the gardens for Villa Spada, Villa Aldini, and Parco della Montagnola in Bologna.
