= Franco Merli =

Italian actor (1956–2025)

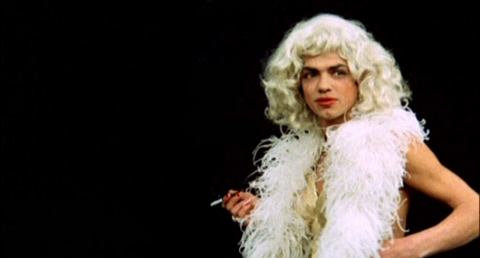
- Merli in 120 Days of Sodom (1975)
- Born: 31 October 1956; Rome, Italy
- Died: 17 May 2025 (aged 68); Rome, Italy
- Occupation: Actor

Franco Merli (31 October 1956 – 17 May 2025) was an Italian actor, who was best known for his role in Salò, or the 120 Days of Sodom.

== Early life ==
Very little is known about Franco Merli, who appeared in several Italian films throughout the 1970s. He was born on 31 October 1956 in Rome, Italy. In 1973, famous Italian poet and filmmaker Pier Paolo Pasolini discovered Merli. The 16-year-old was working as a petrol station attendant at that time (as Ninetto Davoli, a friend of Pasolini and actor in most of his films, recounts). Pasolini was searching for a young man to play the lead in his upcoming feature Arabian Nights. The director immediately knew that Merli, with his small but muscular physique, dark Mediterranean looks, and ready smile, was the perfect choice for the role of Nur Ed Din. Or, as he once said: "(...) a boy from Corleone (in Sicily) who has the innocence of his sixteen years in the physique of an eighteen-year-old."

== Career ==
Arabian Nights appeared in 1974 and was an international success; Merli got a taste for the film business. Following his debut he appeared with his hair bleached blond in Gianni Martucci's 1975 comedy La collegiale.

In 1975, Pasolini hired him once again, for the role of one of the male victims in his infamous Salò, or the 120 Days of Sodom. In this film, Merli was, like the other non-professional actors, addressed by his real first name, Franco. The director chose Merli once again, not only because he embodied the "Pasolini-type" to a fault but also because the young actor had already proven in Arabian Nights that he was perfectly comfortable appearing nude in front of a camera. In a way, Salò made Franco's face immortal since one of the most highly publicised images of the film was the close-up of young Merli as his tongue is cut out in the final torture scenes. Another famous still from the scene where the victims are forced to pose as dogs, prominently showed Franco naked, on all fours, only wearing a dog collar – a fact that didn't enhance his career (see below).

Merli obviously had at least one uncomfortable moment during the shooting of Salò o le 120 giornate di Sodoma, as Ezio Manni – who played the guard who falls in love with the black servant girl (Ines Pellegrini) – remembers. Perhaps surprisingly it wasn't about nudity or the degrading things he and the other actors playing the victims had to undergo in front of the camera but occurred during the scene where Merli is chosen as having the most beautiful rear. The scene calls for Franco to be shot as a "reward" for having won the contest. Reportedly the youngster suddenly went berserk when the gun was put to his head, throwing the scene. Manni says that it took quite some time to calm Merli down again and persuade him to go through with the shot as planned.

According to this source, Merli also was troubled by rumours on the set that he was homosexual. He supposedly was teased by his peers because of that and consequently was on the edge during most of the shooting. Whether this is true is debatable since no other source for this fact seems to exist.

In 1976, Merli appeared on-screen as Fernando, the son of Nino Manfredi, who earns his money as a transvestite prostitute in Down and Dirty. This social satire by Italian director Ettore Scola was also (but for a small part in the 1979 film Il malato immaginario) Franco Merli's swan song as an actor. It is probable that he secured the role of Fernando thanks to his connection with Pasolini, since the director was not only a friend of Scola but was to write a foreword to the film. However, Pasolini was murdered before this came to pass.

Since Merli's mentor had died and his choice of roles (or perhaps the ones he was offered) had been rather unconventional, he failed to find further work in the industry, despite his versatility as an actor with a range from pure innocence to debauchery. The fact that he had become so strongly identified as the "face" and "body" of the controversial Salò was a contributing factor.

=== 2006 ===
In 2006, Franco Merli once again appeared on the big screen when Giuseppe Bertolucci's documentary on Pasolini and the making of Salò, Pasolini prossimo nostro (Pasolini Next to Us), premiered at the Venice Film Festival. Merli could be seen in still photographs and behind the screenshots by set photographer Deborah Beer as well as in the shooting of his torture scene as captured by British documentarist Gideon Bachman. The film was released on DVD in Italy in May 2007.

== Personal life and death ==
Merli lived in Rome and worked in a bank. He had two sons. He also owned a dog, a Pinscher, called Attila.

Merli died following a long illness in Rome, on 17 May 2025, at the age of 68.

== Filmography ==
- 1974: Arabian Nights (Il fiore delle mille e una notte) - Nur-ed-Din
- 1975: Salò, or the 120 Days of Sodom (Salò o le 120 giornate di Sodoma) - Male Victim
- 1975: La collegiale - Stefano
- 1976: Down and Dirty - Fernando
- 1979: Hypochondriac
- 2006: Pasolini prossimo nostro - Himself
