= Salò, or the 120 Days of Sodom =

1975 film by Pier Paolo Pasolini

- Original Italian theatrical release poster
- Italian: Salò o le 120 giornate di Sodoma
- Directed by: Pier Paolo Pasolini
- Screenplay by: Pier Paolo Pasolini; Sergio Citti (Note: Collaboration); Pupi Avati (Note: Uncredited)
- Based on: The 120 Days of Sodom by Marquis de Sade
- Produced by: Alberto Grimaldi
- Starring: Paolo Bonacelli; Giorgio Cataldi; Uberto P. Quintavalle; Aldo Valletti; Caterina Boratto; Elsa De Giorgi; Hélène Surgère; Sonia Saviange
- Cinematography: Tonino Delli Colli
- Edited by: Nino Baragli
- Music by: Ennio Morricone
- Production companies: Produzioni Europee Associati; Les Productions Artistes Associés
- Distributed by: United Artists
- Release dates: 23 November 1975 (Paris); 10 January 1976 (Italy); 19 May 1976 (France)
- Running time: 116 minutes
- Countries: Italy; France
- Languages: Italian; French; German
- Box office: US$1.8 million

Salò, or the 120 Days of Sodom (Italian: Salò o le 120 giornate di Sodoma), billed on-screen as Pasolini's 120 Days of Sodom on English-language prints and commonly referred to as simply Salò (Italian: [saˈlɔ]), is a 1975 political art horror film directed and co-written by Pier Paolo Pasolini. The film is a loose adaptation of the 1785 novel (first published in 1904) The 120 Days of Sodom by the Marquis de Sade, updating the story's setting to Italy during World War II. It was the writer–director's final film, released three weeks after Pasolini's murder.

The film focuses on four wealthy, corrupt Italian libertines in the fascist Italian Social Republic (1943–1945). The libertines kidnap 18 teenagers and subject them to four months of extreme violence, sadism, genital torture and psychological torture. The film explores themes of political corruption, consumerism, authoritarianism, nihilism, morality, capitalism, totalitarianism, sadism, sexuality, and Italian fascism. The story is in four segments, inspired by Dante's Divine Comedy: the Anteinferno, the Circle of Manias, the Circle of Shit, and the Circle of Blood. The film also contains frequent references to and several discussions of Friedrich Nietzsche's 1887 book On the Genealogy of Morality, Ezra Pound's poem The Cantos, and Marcel Proust's novel sequence In Search of Lost Time.

Premiering at the Paris Film Festival on 23 November 1975, the film had a brief theatrical run in Italy before being banned in January 1976, and was released in the United States the following year on 3 October 1977. Because it depicts youths subjected to graphic violence, torture, sexual abuse, and murder, the film was controversial upon its release and has remained banned in many countries.

The confluence of thematic content in the film—ranging from the political and socio-historical, to psychological and sexual—has led to much critical discussion. It has been both praised and decried by various film historians and critics and was named the 65th-scariest film ever made by the Chicago Film Critics Association in 2006.

== Plot ==
The film is separated into four segments with intertitles, inspired by Dante's Divine Comedy:

=== Ante Inferno/Antinferno ===
In 1944, in the Italian Social Republic (RSI), the fascist and German-controlled portion of Italy, four wealthy men of power—the Duke, the Bishop, the Magistrate and the President—agree to marry each other's daughters as the first step in a debauched ritual. They rule that once at the mansion the daughters will act as servants, and must remain completely naked at all times. They then recruit four teenage boys—Bruno, Fabrizio, Claudio and Ezio—as collaborators (guards) in the Decima Flottiglia MAS and four young men (Blackshirt soldiers), called "studs", who are chosen because of their large penises and good looks. The teenage guards and fascist secret police (OVRA) are sent out to capture young victims, of whom nine teenage boys and nine teenage girls are picked and brought to a villa near Marzabotto. One of the boys tries to escape but is shot dead.

=== Circle of Manias/Girone delle Manie ===
Accompanying the libertines at the villa are four middle-aged prostitutes, also collaborators, whose job it is to orchestrate debauched interludes for the men. During the many days at the villa, the four men subject their victims to increasingly abhorrent tortures and humiliations for their own pleasure. During breakfast, the daughters enter the dining hall naked to serve food. One of the studs, Efisio, trips and rapes Liana, the Duke's elder daughter, in front of the fascists and collaborators, who laugh at her cries of pain, aside from Ezio, who is secretly distressed by the ordeal. The President prompts Efisio to penetrate him anally while the Duke sings "Sul Ponte di perati".

After breakfast, one of the victims who had previously tried to escape is shown dead to the crowd. Later, two victims named Sergio and Renata are forced to get married after one of the studs, Guido, and Signora Vaccari forcefully masturbate them. The President and the Duke then respectively rape Sergio and Renata to stop them from having sex with each other, during which the Magistrate additionally engages with the Duke in three-way intercourse.

On another day, the naked victims are forced to act like dogs. When one of the victims, Lamberto, refuses, the Magistrate whips him and feeds Susanna, the President's daughter, a slice of polenta filled with nails.

=== Circle of Shit/Girone della Merda ===
Signora Maggi relates her troubled childhood and her coprophilia. As she explains how she killed her mother over a dispute about her prostitution, Renata cries, remembering the murder of her own mother. The Duke, aroused by the sound of her cries, orders Efisio and the guards to undress her. Renata begs God for death and the Duke forces her to eat his feces with a spoon. Later, at a mock wedding reception for the Magistrate and Sergio, the victims are presented with a meal of human feces, which the studs, prostitutes and masters eat without question. During a search for the victim with the most beautiful buttocks, for which the reward is instant death, Franco is picked. However, the Bishop reveals he was never going to fulfill the initial 'reward', instead promising a far more painful death in the near future.

=== Circle of Blood/Girone del Sangue ===
A Black Mass-like wedding ensues between the studs and the libertines while the latter are dressed in drag. Afterwards, the Bishop examines the captives in their rooms, where they start betraying each other: Claudio reveals that Graziella is hiding a photograph, and Graziella reveals that Eva and Antiniska are having a secret affair. Victim Umberto is appointed to replace Ezio, who is betrayed by Antiniska for having sex with a black maid and, after revealing himself to be a communist, is shot dead by the libertines.

The remaining victims are summoned to determine which of them will be punished, and which ones are eligible to come with the libertines "to Salò". Graziella is spared due to her betrayal of Eva and Antiniska, and Rino is spared due to his submissive relationship with the Duke. Those who are called are given a blue ribbon and sentenced to a painful death, while those who have not been called, provided they keep collaborating with the libertines, can hope to return home. The victims are taken outside and raped, tortured and murdered through methods such as branding, hanging, scalping, burning and having their tongues and eyes cut out, as each libertine watches from the villa through binoculars. Horrified by the atrocities being committed, the pianist jumps out of a window and falls to her death.

As the torture continues, Bruno and Claudio dance a waltz together; Claudio asks the name of Bruno's girlfriend back at home, to which he replies "Margherita".

== Cast ==
Masters

- The Duke (played by Paolo Bonacelli and voiced by Giancarlo Vigorelli); tall, strongly built, bearded, chauvinistic, very sadistic, and a fanatic fascist; enjoys tormenting female victims with verbal abuse and degrading them, his favorite victims being Renata and Fatimah. Highly sexually potent. Shows "loving" feelings for the male victim Rino and allows him to live at the end. Likes to talk about fascist and misanthropic philosophy.
- The Bishop (played by Giorgio Cataldi and voiced by Giorgio Caproni); the Duke's extremely sadistic brother. Writes down several victims' names for punishment. May have a soft spot for Graziella, and is in an apparently affectionate relationship with one of the studs. Likes to torture and mock-execute people.
- The Magistrate (played by Umberto P. Quintavalle and voiced by Aurelio Roncaglia); mustachioed bully who enjoys sadomasochism more than the President; fit and balding; enjoys abusing the victims, yet shows joy from being sodomized. Very strict and cruel.
- The President (played by Aldo Valletti and voiced by Marco Bellocchio); scrawny, weak, and crude. He enjoys dark and punning humor and painful penetration to himself and others. He is passionate about anal sex and will engage in sodomy with any female, but refuses to have vaginal intercourse with them.

Storytellers

- Signora Castelli (played by Caterina Boratto); a prideful, cruel prostitute who jokes about horrible instances. Tells stories during the Circle of Blood.
- Signora Maggi (played by Elsa De Giorgi); a coprophiliac who finds no shame in mooning others or even defecating in front of them. Committed matricide for a nobleman. Tells stories during the Circle of Shit.
- Signora Vaccari (played by Hélène Surgère and dubbed by Laura Betti, voice used in French dub); lively and polite, she was molested as a very young child, but enjoyed it. Tells stories during the Circle of Manias.
- The Pianist (played by Sonia Saviange); soft-spoken, she plays continuously during the day, but is secretly very distressed at the horrors around her. Commits suicide during the final day because she could not witness any more horrors.

Male victims

- Sergio Fascetti – Forced to marry, but kept from actual intercourse. He is then raped by the President. In the end, he is branded by the Bishop and killed. In a lost or deleted scene, he appears sitting in a low chair and is shot.
- Bruno Musso – Carlo Porro; an outspoken boy who shows a foul mouth even to the Masters. One of the Magistrate's favorite victims of bullying. In the end, he is killed after having his left eye gouged out by the Magistrate (and also the other eye and then killed by garrote in a lost or deleted scene).
- Antonio Orlando – Killed after having his penis burned off by the President. In a lost or deleted scene, he appears killed by hanging.
- Claudio Cicchetti – Confesses to the Bishop about Graziella's photograph, leading to a chain of revealed secrets. Killed in the end.
- Franco Merli – Prideful and youthful. Tricked into his position with a promise of sex with an attractive girl. Said to have the most beautiful buttocks. Nearly killed midway through the film, but spared on a promise of a worse future death. He is killed at the end after having his tongue cut off by the President. In a lost or deleted scene, he appears killed by hanging.
- Umberto Chessari – First a victim but later recruited off-screen as a collaborator, and replaces Ezio after he is shot. Becomes drunk with the power over others as a collaborator and start to act like the other fascists (for example aiming at his former victim friends and saying ue, culattoni! [Hey, you fags!] to them).
- Lamberto Book – Lamberto Gobbi; he refuses to eat like a dog and is whipped by the Magistrate. Also killed in the end.
- Gaspare di Jenno – Rino; a slightly masochistic homosexual and the Duke's favorite. Shows sexual feelings and submission for the Duke and is therefore not tortured like other victims. Is also later recruited off-screen.
- Marco Lucantoni – Ferruccio Tonna (uncredited); son of a subversive family, he tries to escape from the truck before the arrival to the mansion, but he is shot by the fascist soldiers who escorted the truck.

Female victims

- Giuliana Melis – Is early on forced to simulate how to manually stimulate the male sex on a dummy, but fails to do it "right". Raped and killed at the end. In a lost or deleted scene, the Duke rapes her while two studs tear off her nipples.
- Faridah Malik – Fatimah; a common victim of both the Duke's sexism and the Magistrate's bullying. In the end, she is scalped by the Magistrate.
- Graziella Aniceto – Finds her time at the Palace unbearable and is calmed by Eva, whom she betrays. She is left alive at the film's end along with Rino.
- Renata Moar – A God-fearing and especially wide-eyed innocent. Forced into the palace just not long after witnessing the death of her mother. She is forced to marry Sergio before being raped by the Duke. When she hears that they killed her mother, she begs God for death. The Duke enjoys tormenting her and at one point forces her to consume his feces. She is killed at the end after having her breasts burned by the President. In a lost or deleted scene, she appears killed by hanging.
- Dorit Henke – Doris; Beautiful and rebellious; the most undisciplined of the girls. She is killed at the end. In a lost or deleted scene, she is raped by the Bishop.
- Antiniska Nemour – In a lesbian relationship with Eva. She is killed at the end.
- Benedetta Gaetani – Admired by the President because of her buttocks. Although she is not present in the blue ribbon ceremony, Benedetta is also killed in the massacre. In a lost or deleted scene, during the final tortures, the Bishop sticks pins in her anus.
- Olga Andreis – Eva; a soft-spoken girl who is friends with Graziella and in love with Antiniska. After Ezio's death, because of her delation, she does not appear again in the movie, leaving her fate unknown. In a lost or deleted scene, after Ezio's killing, she tries to escape from the castle. She is pursued by the four masters, who finally shoot her.
- Anna Troccoli (uncredited) – Inexperienced, shocked and innocent. Attempts to run away, and gets her throat cut and the corpse is put on morbid display by a Catholic icon.

Daughters

- Tatiana Mogilansky – Magistrate's daughter married with the President. A victim of the bullying of the collaborationists and the studs. Once at the mansion is forced to be naked at all times. Raped and killed at the end.
- Susanna Radaelli – President's daughter married with the Duke. Victim of the collaborationists and the Magistrate. Raped at the end by collaborator Claudio (in a lost or deleted scene also by Bruno), and immediately after that is killed by hanging.
- Giuliana Orlandi – Duke's younger daughter married with the Bishop. Whipped by the Bishop and then killed at the end. Is forced to remain completely naked at all times just like the other daughters. In a lost or deleted scene, she is raped by Fabrizio and by victim-turned-collaborator Umberto and is shot.
- Liana Acquaviva – Duke's elder daughter married with the Magistrate. Like the other daughters is required to be completely naked for all 120 days. Raped by one of the studs and killed in the end, in a lost or deleted scene in an electric chair.

Studs

- Rinaldo Missaglia – Like the Duke is strongly built, chauvinistic and very sadistic. Has relations with the President and enjoys tormenting the victims with him. He is maybe the cruelest of the studs, his only competition being Efisio, given his rather extreme brutality and sadism.
- Giuseppe Patruno – Very cruel and depraved. Has relations with the Magistrate and marries him near the end of the film alongside Efisio and Rinaldo. Although he undeniably sadistic, he is maybe the calmest of the Studs.
- Guido Galletti – Friends with Giuseppe and Efisio. Enjoys degrading and humiliating the victims, with Fatimah being of a favourite of his, even at one point using her hands to feel up his penis. Has relations with the Bishop
- Efisio Etzi – A quiet but extremely cruel guard. He is just as depraved as the Masters and has relations with the Duke. Enjoys raping and assaulting female victims especially and takes immense pleasure in the final massacres.

Collaborators

- Claudio Troccoli – A cruel teenage guard, the most depraved of the collaborators. Very sadistic.
- Fabrizio Menichini – A more quiet but equally cruel collaborator. Enjoys mocking and taunting victims (especially women) alongside Claudio and the studs.
- Maurizio Valaguzza &ndash Bruno, The Collaborator; Admires Claudio for his depravity and befriends him, (as well as Fabrizio, and later Umberto) with them frequently sexually harassing the female victims.
- Ezio Manni – a quiet guard who falls in love with the black maid. Like the Pianist is secretly very distressed at the actions around him. He is aware of his fate when he is found out and is shot to death while holding his fist in the air in a Socialist salute.

Servants

- Inès Pellegrini – a maid from the former Italian East Africa (credited as the "Slave Girl") who is in love with Ezio. Disobeyed orders by engaging in intercourse without the presence of the Masters. Is shot after Ezio.

== Production ==
=== Conception ===
"I also realized that Sade, writing, was certainly thinking of Dante. So I began to restructure the film into three Dantesque ditches."

— Pier Paolo Pasolini about the film

Pasolini's writing collaborator Sergio Citti had originally been attached to direct the intended adaptation of the Marquis de Sade's The 120 Days of Sodom. During the creation of the first drafts of the script, Pasolini called upon several of his usual collaborators, among them Citti, Claudio Masenza, Antonio Troisi and especially Pupi Avati.

While collaborating with Citti on the script, Pasolini was compelled to transpose the setting of Salò from 18th-century France (as depicted in de Sade's original book) to the last days of Benito Mussolini's Republic of Salò in the spring of 1944. Salò is a toponymical metonymy for the Italian Social Republic (because Mussolini ruled from this northern town rather than from Rome), which was a puppet state of Nazi Germany. While writing the script, it was decided between Citti and Pasolini that the latter would direct the project, as Citti had planned to write a separate project after completing Salò. Pasolini noted his main contribution to Citti's original screenplay as being its "Dante-esque structure", which Pasolini felt had been de Sade's original intention with the source material.

In the film, almost no background is given on the tortured subjects and, for the most part, they almost never speak. Pasolini's depiction of the victims in such a manner was intended to demonstrate the physical body "as a commodity... the annulment of the personality of the Other." Specifically, Pasolini intended to depict what he described as an "anarchy of power", in which sexual acts and physical abuse functioned as metaphor for the relationship between power and its subjects. Aside from this theme, Pasolini also described the film as being about the "nonexistence of history" as it is seen from Western culture and Marxism.

Interior design was chosen to feature paintings and art by artists such as Severini, Duchamp, and Feininger. Pasolini also stated that the four fascist libertines were written as highly educated characters and were to refer to themes brought up by, among others, Blanchot, Nietzsche, and Klossowski.

==== Trilogy of death ====
In contrast to his "Trilogy of Life" (Il Decameron, I racconti di Canterbury and Il fiore delle Mille e una notte), Pasolini initially planned The 120 days of Sodom and Salò as separate stories, but noting similarity between both concepts – and based on their experiences in the Republic of Salò – conceived the idea of Salò or the 120 Days of Sodom. Pasolini established that the violent scenes in Salò were symbolic and reduced the romanticism of his previous films, although knowing that once the film was premiered would be considered as damned. As a continuation, Pasolini planned to make a biographical film about the life of child murderer Gilles de Rais, but was murdered himself before Salò's release.

=== Casting ===
Initially, Ninetto Davoli was chosen to play Claudio, a young collaborationist, but due to legal problems he had to decline and was replaced by Claudio Troccoli, a young man who had a similarity to Davoli in his first films. Pupi Avati, being the writer, is not officially accredited also due to legal problems. Most of the actors of the cast, although they were natural performers, were non-professionals with minimal or no prior on-camera acting experience. Many of them were models, cast for their willingness to appear naked on-screen.

Franco Merli was considered to be a prototype of the Pasolinian boy. Ezio Manni remembers during filming: "The same with Franco Merli, the guy chosen for having the most beautiful butt. When they reward him by holding the gun to his head, he suddenly protested, he couldn't handle that scene. And the assistant director had to go and give him a hug."

Pasolini regular Franco Citti was to play one of the soldiers' studs, but he did not appear. Laura Betti was also going to play Signora Vaccari, but also because of legal problems and prior commitments to Novecento declined the role, though she doubled the voice of Hélène Surgère in post-production.

Uberto Paolo Quintavalle (the Magistrate) was a writer; he knew Pasolini from working on the newspaper Corriere della Sera. He was chosen for the role because he had all "the characteristics of a decadent intellectual".

Aldo Valletti (the President) was a friend of Pasolini from the time of Accattone. Giorgio Cataldi (the Bishop), another friend of Pasolini, was a clothes seller in Rome.

=== Filming ===
Several outdoor scenes were filmed in Villa Aldini, a neoclassical building on the hills of Bologna. The interiors were shot in Villa Sorra near Castelfranco Emilia. The noble hall of the building and the courtyard were filmed in the Cinecittà studios. The town on the Reno replaces the fictional location in Marzabotto. Other scenes were filmed in Grand Hotel a Villa Feltrinelli in Gargnano.

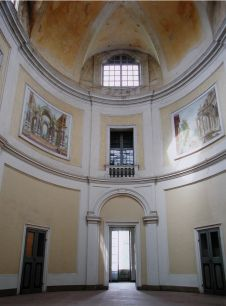
Villa Sorra

The shooting, carried out mainly in the 16th-century Villa Gonzaga-Zani in Villimpenta in the spring of 1975, was difficult and involved scenes of homophilia, coprophagia and sadomasochism. The acts of torture in the courtyard caused some of the actors to suffer abrasions and burns. Actress Hélène Surgère described the film shoot as "unusual", with nearly 40 actors being on set at any given time, and Pasolini shooting "enormous" amounts of footage. She also noted the mood on the set as "paradoxically jovial and immature" in spite of the content. In-between working, the cast shared large meals of risotto and also had football games played against the crew of Bernardo Bertolucci's Novecento, which was being filmed nearby. It also marked the reconciliation between the then 34-year-old Bertolucci and his old mentor after several disagreements following Pasolini's criticism of Last Tango in Paris (1972) and his failure to defend it from drastic censorship measures. During the soccer match against the crew of Novecento both directors supported their teams, except that while Bertolucci did it from the bench, Pasolini played directly on the field. The crew of Novecento wore a purple shirt with phosphorescent bands to distract the opponents and had lined up, passing them off as engineers, two players from the youth team of Calcio Parma. The Salò crew lost 5 to 2 and Pasolini, furious, left the field before the end shouting: "He doesn't read anything anymore, that guy!" to Bertolucci.

During production, some reels were stolen and the thieves demanded a ransom for their return. Using doubles, the same scenes were reshot but from a different angle. At the trial for Pasolini's murder, it was hypothesized that Pasolini was told the film reels were discovered in Ostia Lido. He was led there by Pelosi, the accused, and fell victim to an ambush, where he was murdered. However, there is no concrete evidence for this theory.

=== Post-production ===
==== Musical score ====
The original music corresponds to Ennio Morricone interpreted at the piano by Arnaldo Graziosi. Other non-original music was Veris leta facies from Carl Orff's cantata Carmina Burana at nearly the end of the film during Circle of Blood. Other music were several Frédéric Chopin's pieces: Preludes Op. 28, no. 17 and no. 4, and Valse Op. 34, no. 2, in A minor.

==== Dubbing ====
Like most Italian films of the time, Salò was shot MOS (without direct sound), with all dialogue and foley effects dubbed in post-production. The controversy surrounding the production dissuaded the actors playing the Masters to return to loop their lines, so they were all re-dubbed by other (uncredited) actors. French actress Hélène Surgère (Vaccari) had her dialogue dubbed by Laura Betti.

==== Alternative endings ====
Pasolini was undecided on what type of conclusion the film should have, to the point of having conceived and shot four different endings: the first was a shot of a red flag in the wind with the words "Love You", but it was abandoned by the director because he thought it "too pompous" and "prone to the ethics of psychedelic youth", which he detested. The second showed all the actors, other than the four gentlemen, the director and his troupe perform a wild dance in a room of the villa furnished with red flags and the scene was filmed with the purpose of using it as a background scene during the credits, but was discarded because it appeared, in the eyes of Pasolini, chaotic and unsatisfactory. Another final scene, discovered years later and which was only in the initial draft of the script, showed, after the torture's end, the four gentlemen walk out of the house and drawing conclusions about the morality of the whole affair. Finally, keeping the idea of dance as the summation of carnage, Pasolini chose to mount the so-called final "Margherita", with the two young blackshirts dancing.

== Release ==
Salò premiered at the Paris Film Festival on 23 November 1975, three weeks after Pasolini's death. In Italy, the film was initially rejected for screening by the Italian censorship, but received approval on 23 December 1975. The approval, however, was withdrawn three weeks after the film's Italian release in January 1976 and it was formally banned. Worldwide distribution for the film was supplied by United Artists. In the United States, however, the film was given a limited release via Zebra Releasing Corporation on 3 October 1977 without a rating due to the fact an MPAA submission would have guaranteed an X rating.

=== Censorship ===
"Sadomasochism is an eternal characteristic of man. It existed during de Sade's time, and it exists now. But that's not what matters most...The real meaning of the sex in my film is as a metaphor for the relationship between power and its subjects."

— Pasolini on the film's depiction of sex, 1975.

Salò has been banned in several countries, because of its graphic portrayals of rape, torture and murder—mainly of people thought to be younger than eighteen years of age. The film remains banned in several countries and sparked numerous debates among critics and censors about whether or not it constituted pornography due to its nudity and graphic depiction of sexual acts. In Italy, the film's producer, Alberto Grimaldi, faced obscenity charges in court in January 1976, accused of "offending Italians' "sense of modesty" by producing a work "consisting totally of images and language representing sexual deviations and perversions.""

The film was rejected by the British Board of Film Censors (BBFC) in January 1976. It was first screened at the Old Compton Street Cinema Club in Soho, London in 1977, in an uncut form and without certification from BBFC secretary James Ferman; the premises were raided by the Metropolitan Police after a few days. A cut version prepared under Ferman's supervision, again without formal certification, was subsequently screened under cinema club conditions for some years. In 2000, in an uncut form, the film was finally passed for theatrical and video distribution in the United Kingdom.

The film was not banned in the United States and received a limited release in October 1977; it was, however, banned in Ontario, Canada. In 1994, an undercover policeman in Cincinnati, Ohio, rented the film from a local gay bookstore and then arrested the owners for "pandering". A large group of artists, including Martin Scorsese and Alec Baldwin, and scholars signed a legal brief arguing the film's artistic merit; the Ohio state court dismissed the case because the police violated the owners' Fourth Amendment rights, without reaching the question of whether the film was obscene.

It was banned in Australia in 1976 for reasons of indecency. After a 17-year-long ban, the Australian Classification Board passed the film with an R-18+ (for 18 and older only) uncut for theatrical release in July 1993. However, the Australian Classification Review Board overturned this decision in February 1998 and banned the film outright, for "offensive cruelty with high impact, sexual violence and depictions of offensive and revolting fetishes". The film was then pulled from all Australian cinemas. Salò was resubmitted for classification in Australia in 2008, only to be rejected once again. The DVD print was apparently a modified version, causing outrage in the media over censorship and freedom of speech. In 2010, the film was submitted again and passed with an R18+ rating. According to the Australian Classification Board media release, the DVD was passed due to "the inclusion of 176 minutes of additional material which provided a context to the feature film." The media release also stated that "The Classification Board wishes to emphasise that this film is classified R18+ based on the fact that it contains additional material. Screening this film in a cinema without the additional material would constitute a breach of classification laws." The majority opinion of the board stated that the inclusion of additional material on the DVD "facilitates wider consideration of the context of the film which results in the impact being no more than high." This decision came under attack by FamilyVoice Australia (formerly the Festival of Light Australia), the Australian Christian Lobby and Liberal Party of Australia Senator Julian McGauran, who tried to have the ban reinstated, but the Board refused. The film was released on Blu-ray Disc and DVD on 8 September 2010.

In New Zealand, the film was originally banned in 1976. The ban was upheld in 1993. In 1997, special permission was granted for the film to be screened uncut at a film festival. In 2001, the DVD was finally passed uncut with an 'R18' rating.

=== Home media ===
The Criterion Collection first released the film in 1993 on LaserDisc, following with a DVD release in 1998. In 2011, The Criterion Collection released a newly restored version on Blu-ray and DVD in conjunction with Metro-Goldwyn-Mayer as a two-disc release with multiple interviews collected on the accompanying second disc.

== Reception ==
=== Box office ===
Salò, or the 120 Days of Sodom grossed $1,810,733 internationally, with $1,786,578 of its box office revenue being generated in Sweden alone.

=== Critical response ===
The review aggregator website Rotten Tomatoes reports a 74% approval rating based on 42 reviews, with an average rating of 6.90/10. The site's consensus reads, "Salò, or the 120 Days of Sodom will strike some viewers as irredeemably depraved, but its unflinching view of human cruelty makes it impossible to ignore."

Director Michael Haneke named the film his fourth-favorite film when he voted for the 2002 Sight and Sound poll. Director Catherine Breillat and critic Joel David also voted for the film. David Cross, Brady Corbet, Gaspar Noé, and Korn frontman Jonathan Davis have named it one of their favorite films. Rainer Werner Fassbinder also cited it as one of his 10 favorite films. A 2000 poll of critics conducted by The Village Voice named it the 89th-greatest film of the 20th century. Director John Waters said, "Salo is a beautiful film...it uses obscenity in an intelligent way...and it's about the pornography of power."

Jonathan Rosenbaum of the Chicago Reader wrote of the film: "Roland Barthes noted that in spite of all its objectionable elements (he pointed out that any film that renders Sade real and fascism unreal is doubly wrong), this film should be defended because it 'refuses to allow us to redeem ourselves.' It's certainly the film in which Pasolini's protest against the modern world finds its most extreme and anguished expression. Very hard to take, but in its own way an essential work."

The film's reputation for pushing boundaries has led some critics to criticize or avoid it; the Time Out film guide, for example, deemed the film a "thoroughly objectionable piece of work", adding that it "offers no insights whatsoever into power, politics, history or sexuality." TV Guide gave the film a mixed review awarding it a score of 2.5/4, stating, "despite moments of undeniably brilliant insight, is nearly unwatchable, extremely disturbing, and often literally nauseous".

Upon the film's United States release, Vincent Canby of The New York Times wrote, "Salo is, I think, a perfect example of the kind of material that, theoretically, anyway, can be acceptable on paper but becomes so repugnant when visualized on the screen that it further dehumanizes the human spirit, which is supposed to be the artist's concern." In 2011 Roger Ebert wrote that he owned the film since its release on LaserDisc but had not watched it, citing the film's transgressive reputation. In 2011, David Haglund of Slate surveyed five film critics and three of them said that it was required viewing for any serious critic or cinephile. Haglund concluded that he still would not watch the film.

=== Scholarly analysis ===
Salò has received critical analysis from film scholars, critics and others for its converging depictions of sexual violence and cross-referencing of historical and sociopolitical themes. Commenting on the film's prevalent sexual themes, horror film scholar Stephen Barber writes: "The core of Salò is the anus, and its narrative drive pivots around the act of sodomy. No scene of a sex act has been confirmed in the film until one of the libertines has approached its participants and sodomized the figure committing the act. The filmic material of Salò is one that compacts celluloid and feces, in Pasolini's desire to burst the limits of cinema, via the anally resonant eye of the film lens." Barber also notes that Pasolini's film reduces the extent of the storytelling sequences present in de Sade's The 120 Days of Sodom so that they "possess equal status" with the sadistic acts committed by the libertines.

Pasolini scholar Gian Annovi notes in the book Pier Paolo Pasolini: Performing Authorship (2007) that Salò is stylistically and thematically marked by a "link between Duchamp's Dada aesthetics and the perverse dynamics of desire", which, according to Annovi, became artistic points of interest for Pasolini in the early developments of Salò.

Dallas Marshall for Film Inquiry wrote in an article from 2021 that "Salò is his [Pasolini's] strongest diatribe against consumerism", and other critics have brought up that the film is to be seen as symbolism; a metaphor for the modern society, capitalism, and especially consumerism, i.e., how "those in power can make people consume crap (ads, commercials, etc.) and those of the people who resist die, and the majority passively obeys and goes along with the system, and a few will collaborate with the rulers". The Film Inquiry article also mentions this metaphor: "Much like the citizens of fascist Italy and Nazi Germany, the prisoners were eating up the bullshit of dictators. But it goes deeper than that because one of the aspects of modern society that Pasolini had a great disdain for was mass consumerism. The man viewed consumerism, especially that of processed foods, to be pesticide on the human soul and eating literal excrement. He yearned for the days of classical beauty and good food that nourished the body. He viewed the modern world as a perversion and was thoroughly disgusted with its trajectory." The BBFC notes that the film "is intended as a critique of both fascism and consumerism".

Similarly, building on the film's reference to Pierre Klossowski's Sade mon prochain, art historian Michael Newell Witte in the book Klossowski, Pasolini, Gurrola (2026) argues that Salò translates Klossowski's concepts of "accursed virility" and "living currency" into filmic syntax. Witte posits that Pasolini uses bodily repetition and ceremonial torture as a political economic critique of consumer capitalism, where human bodies and language are reduced to standardized commodities.

== Legacy ==
Salò has earned a reputation among some film scholars for being the "sickest film of all time," with some citing it as an early progenitor of the extreme cinema subgenre, alongside the American film The Last House on the Left (1972).

Film scholar Matthias Frey notes that the cross-section between the film's thematic content and graphic visuals has resulted in it being considered both a horror film as well as an art film:

[Films like Salò], which are usually considered by critics as 'works' by the 'artists' ... might be received in practice also by individuals who watch Saw or Hostel or any 'popular' or cult horror film.

In 2006, the Chicago Film Critics Association named it the 65th-scariest film ever made.

In 2008, Adam Chodzko, an English artist, released a short film on Super 8 film called Reunion: Salò, 1998. Chodzko placed advertisements in newspapers and in hopes of reuniting the sixteen actors who had portrayed the roles of the adolescents who were tortured to death in Salò. Chodzko only found one of the actors, Antiniska Nemour, who was working in dentistry in Italy. Chodzko made the film with Nemour as the "guest of honor" and the other actors portrayed by doubles who resembled the original cast members.

In 2010, the Toronto International Film Festival placed it at no. 47 on its list of "The Essential 100 films."

== See also ==
- Sweet Movie
- Cannibal Holocaust
- List of cult films
- Films dealing with Nazism and sexuality
