= Frankenstein all'italiana – Prendimi, straziami, che brucio de passion! =

- Italian theatrical release poster
- Directed by: Armando Crispino
- Screenplay by: Massimo Franciosa; Luisa Montagnana
- Story by: Massimo Franciosa; Luisa Montagnana
- Produced by: Filiberto Bandini
- Starring: Gianrico Tedeschi; Jenny Tamburi; Ninetto Davoli
- Cinematography: Giuseppe Aquari
- Edited by: Angela Cipriani
- Music by: Stelvio Cipriani
- Production company: R.P.A. S.A.S.
- Distributed by: Euro International Film
- Release date: 23 November 1975 (Italy)
- Running time: 96 minutes
- Country: Italy

Frankenstein all'italiana – Prendimi, straziami, che brucio de passion! (Italian: Frankenstein Italian Style – Take Me, Torture Me, as I am Burning with Passion!) is a 1975 Italian comedy horror film, directed by Armando Crispino.

In the film, Victor Frankenstein retires to his castle with his new wife. But both Frankenstein's monster and Frankenstein's assistant are sexually attracted to Victor's wife.

== Plot ==
Dr. Victor Frankenstein creates a monster to show his scientific theories, but soon leaves him. So the scientist tries to rebuild his life by getting married with Janet, and retires to his castle with Igor. However, the monster comes back to haunt Frankenstein, and soon Victor finds out that the monster has a ferocious sexual attraction to Janet. Frankenstein then calls Igor to readjust the monster, but Igor also takes advantage of Janet...

== Cast ==
- Gianrico Tedeschi as Dr. Frankenstein
- Aldo Maccione as The Monster
- Jenny Tamburi as Janet
- Lorenza Guerrieri as Alice
- Anna Mazzamauro as Maud
- Ninetto Davoli as Igor
- Aldo Valletti
- Alvaro Vitali

== Production ==
Frankenstein all'italiana – Prendimi, straziami, che brucio de passion! is the eighth and final film directed by Armando Crispino. The film entered development under the title Frankenstein diventa nonno (lit. 'Frankenstein Becomes Grandpa').

It was shot in Bomarzo and at R.P.A. Elios Studios in Rome. Crispino later described the film as "a compromise dictated by necessity, if not a mistake. It's the only one of my films that was born from a script in which I did not take part at all...However I think I can say that the movie was not completely shameful, at least in the first part."

== Release ==
Frankenstein all'italiana – Prendimi, straziami, che brucio de passion! was released in Italy where it was distributed by Euro International Film on 23 November 1975. This release was very brief and was immediately withdrawn. It was re-edited and re-released in mid-1976 with the title Prendimi straziami, che brucio di passion!. It was later released to Italian television as Stringimi forte che burcio di passione.
