= Aldo Valletti =

Italian actor (1930–1992)

- Born: 2 January 1930; Rome, Kingdom of Italy
- Died: 1 January 1992 (aged 61); Rome, Italy
- Occupation: Actor
- Years active: 1956–1980

Aldo Valletti (2 January 1930 – 1 January 1992) was an Italian film actor best known for the role of President Curval in Salò, or the 120 Days of Sodom, directed by Pier Paolo Pasolini.

== Biography ==
Aldo Valletti was born 1930 in Rome. His first appearance in cinema, uncredited, dates back to 1956, in Poor, But Handsome by Dino Risi.

After numerous uncredited and minor roles, in 1975, he was chosen by Pasolini to star in the film Salò, or the 120 Days of Sodom, in which his character was voiced by Marco Bellocchio. Answering a question about the choice of Valletti for Salò, Pasolini said: "This is a generic actor that in more twenty years of work has never spoken a word."

Later, he appeared in a number of films in supporting roles, working with, among others, Damiano Damiani, Fernando Di Leo, Tinto Brass and Steno; his last appearance was in 1980, in Arrivano i gatti by Carlo Vanzina.

== Filmography ==
Year	Title	Role	Notes
1956	Poor, But Handsome	Extra	Uncredited
1974	Shoot First, Die Later	Host	
1974	Il profumo della signora in nero	Man of the Sect	Uncredited
1974	Il lumacone	Extra	Uncredited
1974	Super Stooges vs. the Wonder Women	Extra	
1975	L'educanda	Extra	
1975	Salò, or the 120 Days of Sodom	The President	
1975	Frankenstein all'italiana	Extra	
1975	Pasqualino Settebellezz	Madman	Uncredited
1976	Salon Kitty	Dart Throwing Client	Uncredited
1976	Febbre da cavallo	Spettatore al processo	Uncredited
1977	Stato interessante	Carucci	(second story)
1977	Io ho paura	The Prison Governor	
1978	Tutto suo padre	Extra	
1980	Arrivano i gatti	Ospite al party del commendatore	Uncredited, (final film role)
