= Villa Spada =

Neoclassical mansion in Bologna, Italy

Coordinates: 44.492070°N 11.401704°E

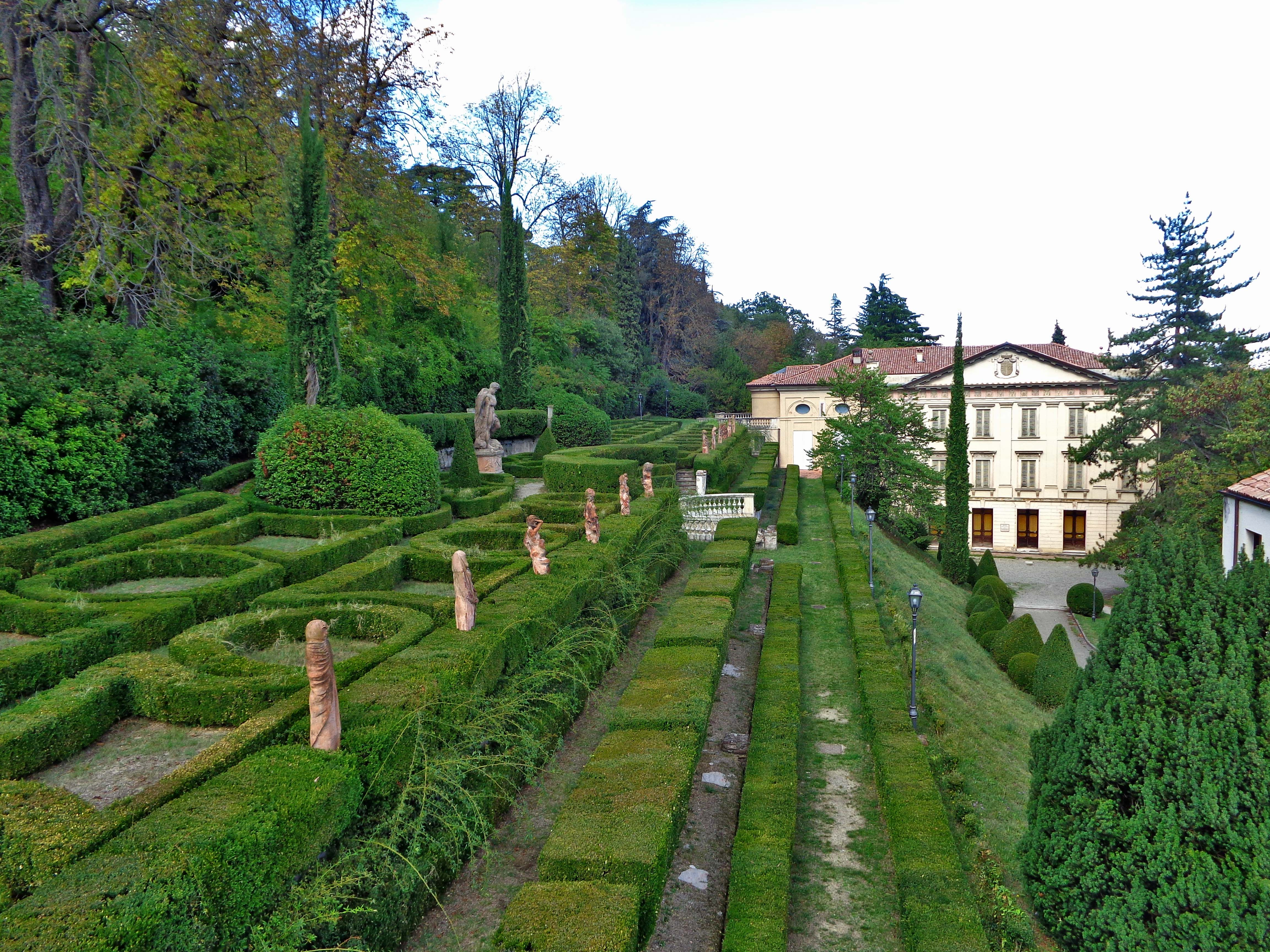

The Villa Spada is a former-aristocratic suburban Neoclassical mansion with a surrounding formal and informal gardens located on Via di Casaglia #3, outside of Porta Saragozza, to the southwest of central Bologna, Italy. Since the 1990s, it houses the Museum of Textiles and Upholstery Vittorio Zironi (Museo del Tessuto e della Tappezzeria "Vittorio Zironi"). The surrounding gardens in the hill provide views of Bologna.

== History ==
A villa at the site was commissioned initially by the aristocrat Jacopo Zambeccari (died 1795) from the architect Giovanni Battista Martinetti. In 1820, the villa was inherited by the family of Clemente Veralli Spada, and afterwards had various private owners including the Pisa and Levi family. In the 1960s it was passed on to the municipality of Bologna. The gardens have a faux-medieval tower.

The interior has sculptures by Giacomo De Maria, and has some painting decorations by Serafino Barozzi and Filippo Pedrini.
