= Eyeball (film) =

1975 film directed by Umberto Lenzi

- Directed by: Umberto Lenzi
- Written by: Felix Tusell; Umberto Lenzi
- Starring: John Richardson; Martine Brochard; Ines Pellegrini; Andrés Mejuto; Mirta Miller; George Rigaud; Raf Baldassarre; Silvia Solar; Daniele Vargas
- Cinematography: Antonio Millán
- Edited by: Amedeo Moriani
- Music by: Bruno Nicolai
- Production companies: National Cinematografica Pioneer; Estela Films
- Distributed by: Indipendenti Regionali (Italy); Castro Films S.A. (Spain)
- Release dates: January 1975 (Italy); 13 August 1975 (Spain)
- Running time: 92 minutes
- Countries: Italy; Spain

Eyeball (Italian: Gatti rossi in un labirinto di vetro, lit. 'Red Cats in a Glass Maze') is a 1975 giallo film co-written and directed by Umberto Lenzi, and starring John Richardson, Martine Brochard, Ines Pellegrini, Andrés Mejuto, Mirta Miller, George Rigaud, Raf Baldassarre, Silvia Solar and Daniele Vargas. It was an international co-production between Italy and Spain, and follows a group of American tourists in Barcelona who are stalked by a killer who removes their victims' eyes.

== Plot ==
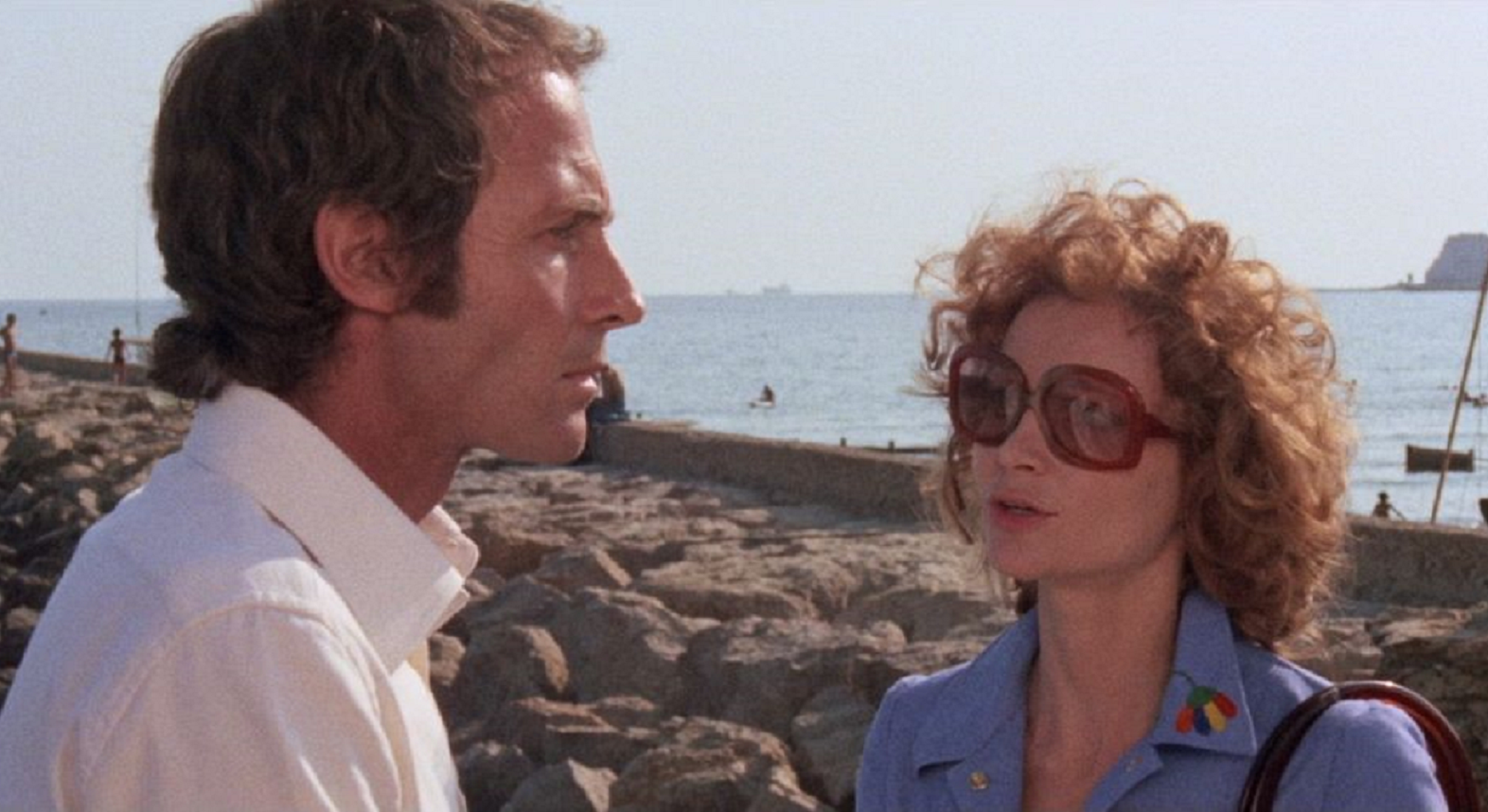
John Richardson and Martine Brochard in a scene from the film

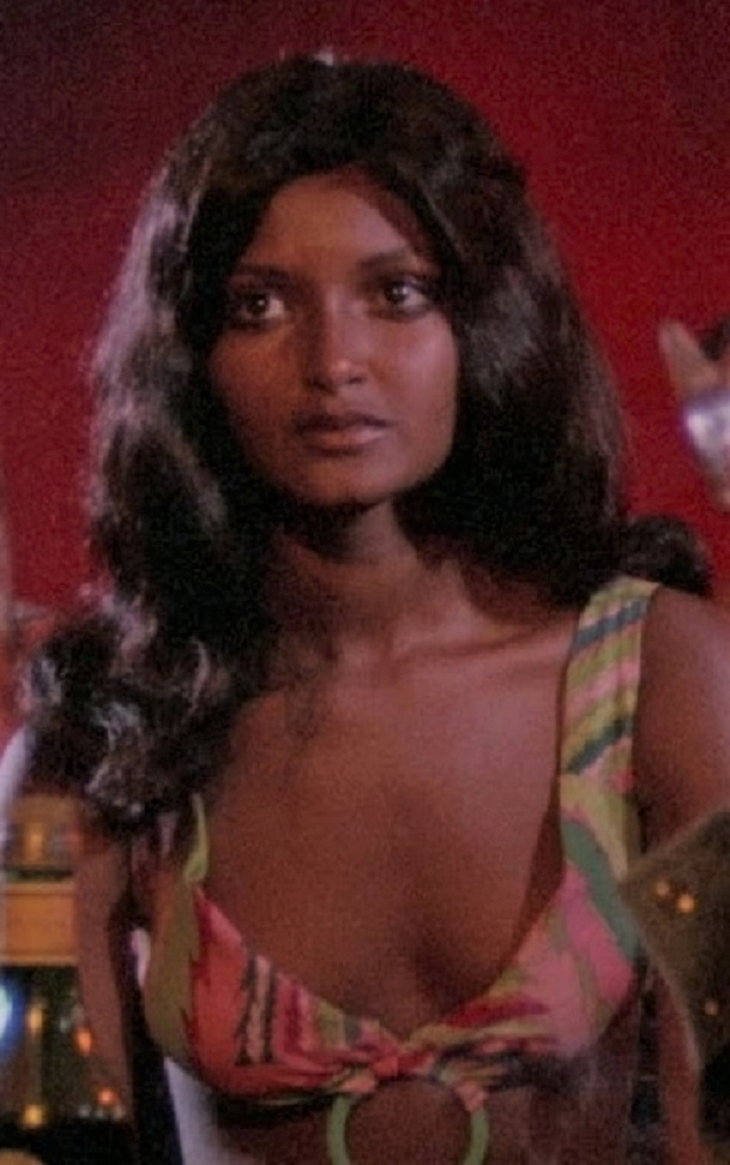
Ines Pellegrini in a scene from the film

Alma Burton, whose marriage to Mark, the owner of a marketing company in Vermont, is on the verge of divorce, is supposed to go to a mental institution in New York for treatment. However, at the airport she changes her plans at short notice and travels to Barcelona.

While in the Spanish city, a tour group of American tourists, which includes the secretary Paulette Stone, the lesbian photographer Lisa Sanders and her model girlfriend Naiba, as well as several wealthy entrepreneurs, are exploring Barcelona's sights by bus. However, the traveling party is soon shaken by a gruesome incident: the mysterious murder of a local woman. The victim, a young girl, is brutally killed by a murderer wearing a red raincoat who also gouges out her left eye. Soon after, the attractive American Peggy becomes the unknown serial killer's next victim, causing consternation among the travelers.

The aging Inspector Tudela, who is in his last week of work before retirement, takes over the investigation together with his young successor. The police are initially in the dark, but soon suspect that the perpetrator is in the group's environment, so that each of the travelers is formally classified as a potential murderer.

Mark Burton also soon joins the group, which includes his secret mistress, Paulette Stone. However, the series of murders does not stop, and Mark briefly fears that his unstable wife could be the murderer, as he once found her lying on the ground next to him with a bloody knife and one eye in her hand. He kept this incident quiet at the time and even covered up the traces so as not to endanger his marriage. He secretly thinks his wife Alma, who he currently suspects is somewhere in Barcelona, is a suspect. He initially kept this fact secret from the authorities.

Shortly after, Lisa Sanders is murdered, but before her death she manages to take an incriminating photo of the serial killer: Paulette, while Naiba interrupts the attack so that Paulette, contrary to previous crimes, does not mutilate her victim. Nevertheless, the series of murders does not stop and the number of tourists continues to decline until the serial perpetrator is caught red-handed at the end of the film. In the presence of Naiba and Mark, the inspector fatally injures Paulette, armed with a knife. It is revealed that her left eye is missing due to an accident when she was a child, hence her mutilation of the murder victims.

In the last scene of the film, the young inspector congratulates his experienced predecessor, who managed to solve the delicate series of murders within a week. Mark also makes a conciliatory phone call to his wife Alma, whom he gives another chance to save his marriage.

== Cast ==
- Martine Brochard as Paulette Stone
- John Richardson as Mark Burton
- Ines Pellegrini as Naiba Levin
- Mirta Miller as Lisa Sanders
- Daniele Vargas as Robby Alvarado
- Andrés Mejuto as Inspector Tudela
- George Rigaud as Bronson
- Silvia Solar as Gail Alvarado
- Raf Baldassarre as Martinez
- José María Blanco as Inspector Lara
- Marta May as Alma Burton
- John Bartha as Mr. Hamilton
- Olga Pehar as Mrs. Randall
- Verónica Miriel as Jenny Hamilton
- Olga Montes as Peggy Randall
- Richard Kolin as Mr. Randall
- Rina Mascetti as Hospital Nurse
- Fulvio Mingozzi as Policeman
- Tom Felleghy as Coroner

== Release ==
=== Home media ===
The film was released on DVD by Sinister Film on January 1, 2014.

It was announced that 88 Films would release a Mega edition of the film on Blu-ray on August 27, 2018. 88 Films announced a very special limited edition of the film to be released late November 2024 with brand new 4K Remaster from the Original Techniscope Negative presented in 4K Ultra High Definition Blu-ray (2160p), Italian and English audio and newly translated English subtitles.

== Reception ==
In his analysis of the film, author Louis Paul described the film as "entertaining" and "enjoyable". The Terror Trap gave the film 3/4 stars, calling it "[a] Completely enjoyable giallo from Umberto Lenzi". The reviewer also commended the film's score, "bizarro plot", cast, and death sequences. Justin Kerswell from Hysteria Lives! awarded the film 3/5 stars, stating that the film was director Lenzi's least accomplished giallo, but also stated that it was "a thoroughly entertaining 90 minutes of slasher trash". Dan Budnik from The Bleeding Skull! called the film "a mighty entertaining giallo", and commended the film's atmosphere, pacing, and odd characters.

TV Guide hated the film, calling it "worthless", and criticized the film's gimmicky villain.
