= Ines Pellegrini =

Italian actress

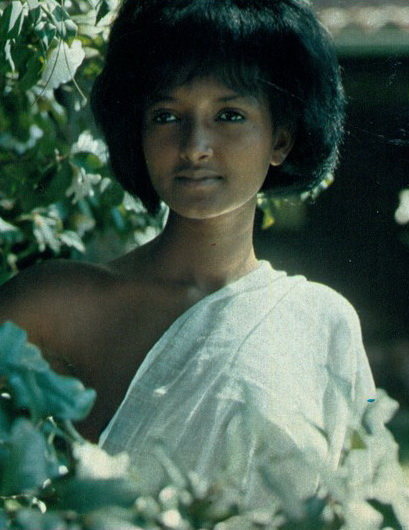
- Pellegrini in 1974
- Born: 7 November 1954 (age 71); Massawa, Eritrea
- Occupation: Actress
- Years active: 1973–1985

Ines Pellegrini (born 7 November 1954) is an Italian retired actress of Eritrean origin.

== Life and career ==
Pelligrini was born and spent her childhood in the former Italian colony of Eritrea during the Ethiopia occupation and colonization of the territory, attending Italian schools, before moving to Italy with her adoptive father in the 1970s. She made her film debut in 1973 in Il brigadiere Pasquale Zagaria ama la mamma e la polizia but her career was launched by Pier Paolo Pasolini, who chose her for the role of Zumurrud in Arabian Nights (1974); she also appeared in Pasolini's last film, Salò, or the 120 Days of Sodom (1975).

Pasolini wrote about her, saying: "When I noticed a half-caste Eritrean-Italian, I almost cried looking at her small, somewhat irregular features, perfect as those of a metal statue, hearing her chirpy, interrogatory Italian, and seeing those eyes, lost in a pleading uncertainty."

Later Pellegrini became a minor starlet in Italian films including Eyeball (1975), La madama (1976), Blue Belle (1976), Una bella governante di colore (1978) and War of the Robots (1978), appearing in 16 films between 1974 and 1981. In the mid-1980s, she left show business and moved to Los Angeles, where she opened a downtown antiques shop and promoted volunteering.
