= Villa Aldini =

Neoclassical mansion in Bologna, Italy

Coordinates: 44.48153°N 11.33032°E

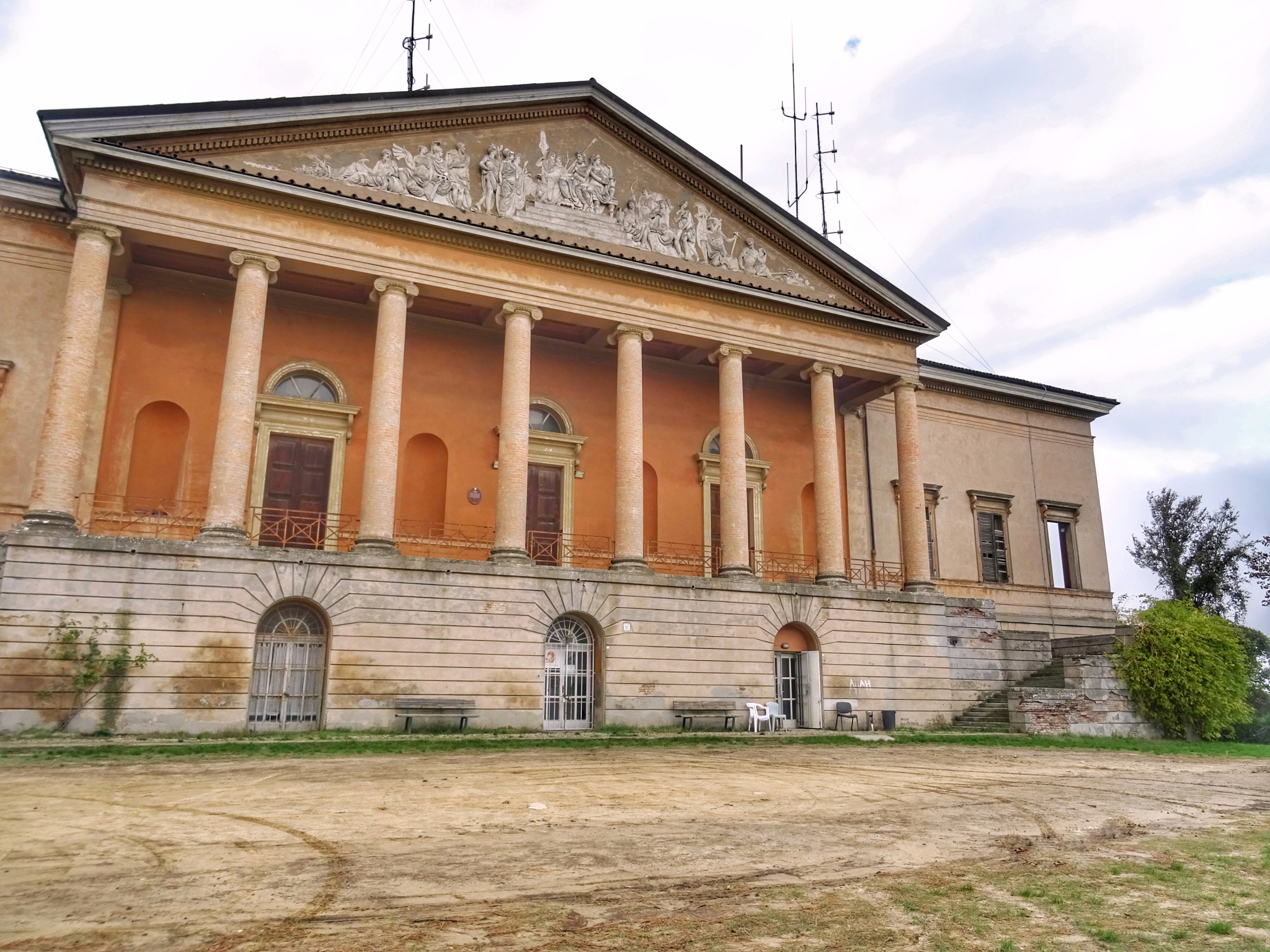

The Villa Aldini is a former-aristocratic suburban Neoclassical mansion located on a hill top on Via dell'Osservanza #35, to the southwest of central Bologna, Italy. The main villa incorporated the circular Romanesque shrine of Santa Maria del Monte.

== History ==
A villa at the site was commissioned in 1811 by the Antonio Aldini, minister and plenipotentiary for Napoleon. The architect Giuseppe Nadi designed the villa. Work was interrupted in 1816 with the fall of Napoleon. The broad tympanum facing towards the town center was decorated by the sculptor Giacomo De Maria with pedimental sculptures depicting Olympus. The interiors were frescoed by Felice Giani.

The house was auctioned off in 1832, and demolition was contemplated. Bought subsequently by local citizens, in 1842 the architect Antonio Serra converted some of the rooms into a consecrated church. In 2022, the commune of Bologna refurbished the interior of the complex.
