= Ragazzi di vita =

1955 novel by Pier Paolo Pasolini

- The cover of Ragazzi di vita
- Author: Pier Paolo Pasolini
- Publication date: 1955
- Publication place: Italy

Ragazzi di vita (Italian pronunciation: [raˈɡattsi di ˈviːta]; English: literally boys of life, idiomatically hustlers) is a novel by Italian author, poet and intellectual Pier Paolo Pasolini. It was published in 1955.

The first English translation was by William Weaver (copyright - Jonathan Cape 1968) and issued by Panther Books in 1970.

A further English translation by Ann Goldstein appeared in 2016; she renders the title as The Street Kids. Earlier translations called it The Ragazzi or The Hustlers. A 2023 translation by Tim Parks is titled Boys Alive.

== Plot ==
The novel tells the story of Riccetto, a street urchin to whom the audience is first introduced during his Confirmation and First Communion. Not too long afterwards, Riccetto is stealing from a blind beggar and a convent. Over the next few years, the reader follows along with Riccetto as he goes from robbery to scam to prostituting himself and back again while drifting around. During this time, many of his companions are killed or die off and there is constant immorality at hand. He is finally arrested and put in jail after trying to steal some iron in order to buy his fiancée an engagement ring. He is released afterwards and goes back to his same street life. Pasolini makes it clear to the reader that Riccetto and his peers are wanderers by nature, they have no life plans or goals and don't care to; Riccetto is a more deviant Dean Moriarty of sorts. This is the way in which Pasolini finds this subclass of people to be free from modernity and rooted in a way of life that has since been lost. He also admired "what he considered their pre-political rebelliousness"; they were separated from the partisan politics that plagued post-war modern Italy.

== Composition ==
Pasolini wished to bring to the attention of the public the existence of this underground class they thought extinct. As he saw it, "They were thought of as a closed book. Yet, poor devils, they really did exist". He wrote the book in lowbrow language and derogatory slang that the real life "lumpen proletariat" would use. It made the book difficult for mainstream readers, the reading public that Pasolini opposed. He later wrote in Heretical Empiricism that literature should be "written in a language substantially different from that of the writer, not leaving out of consideration a certain naturalism". Another alienating characteristic of the book is the fact that the narrator does not provide any background information for readers unfamiliar with the social setting of his story. His narration puts himself on the same level as his characters. He does not narrate from above. He saw the underground class as the only ones who survived the corruption brought about of industrialization and modernity, a sort of human time capsule, the only ones who are truly free. He respects them for this and sees them as the true underclass that even the Communist Party looks down on.

== Significance ==
Ragazzi di vita parallels some of Pasolini's films like Mamma Roma and La Ricotta in developing his own form of neo-realism, separate from that of Roberto Rossellini and other post-war directors. Pasolini carried neo-realism further creating a sort of "hyper-realism". While Rossellini highlights the lives of the common man, Pasolini seeks to highlight the lives of the sub-common man. Ragazzi di Vita is a milestone for the development of Pasolini's passion for this genre.

== Public reception ==
The novel was criticized among the general public (as were many of his films) upon its release and was heavily censored. The government led by the Christian Democrats condemned its "obscenity". The communists did not approve of the book, as well, charging it with "artificiality, an absence of positive heroes, and, especially, a lack of 'perspective'".
