= Nuovi Argomenti =

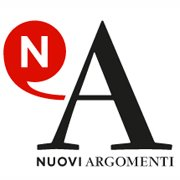
- Editor-in-chief: Dacia Maraini
- Categories: Literary magazine
- Frequency: Quarterly
- Founded: 1953; 72 years ago
- Company: Mondadori
- Country: Italy
- Based in: Rome
- Language: Italian
- Website: Nuovi Argomenti

Nuovi Argomenti is an Italian literary magazine which was started in 1953 in Rome.

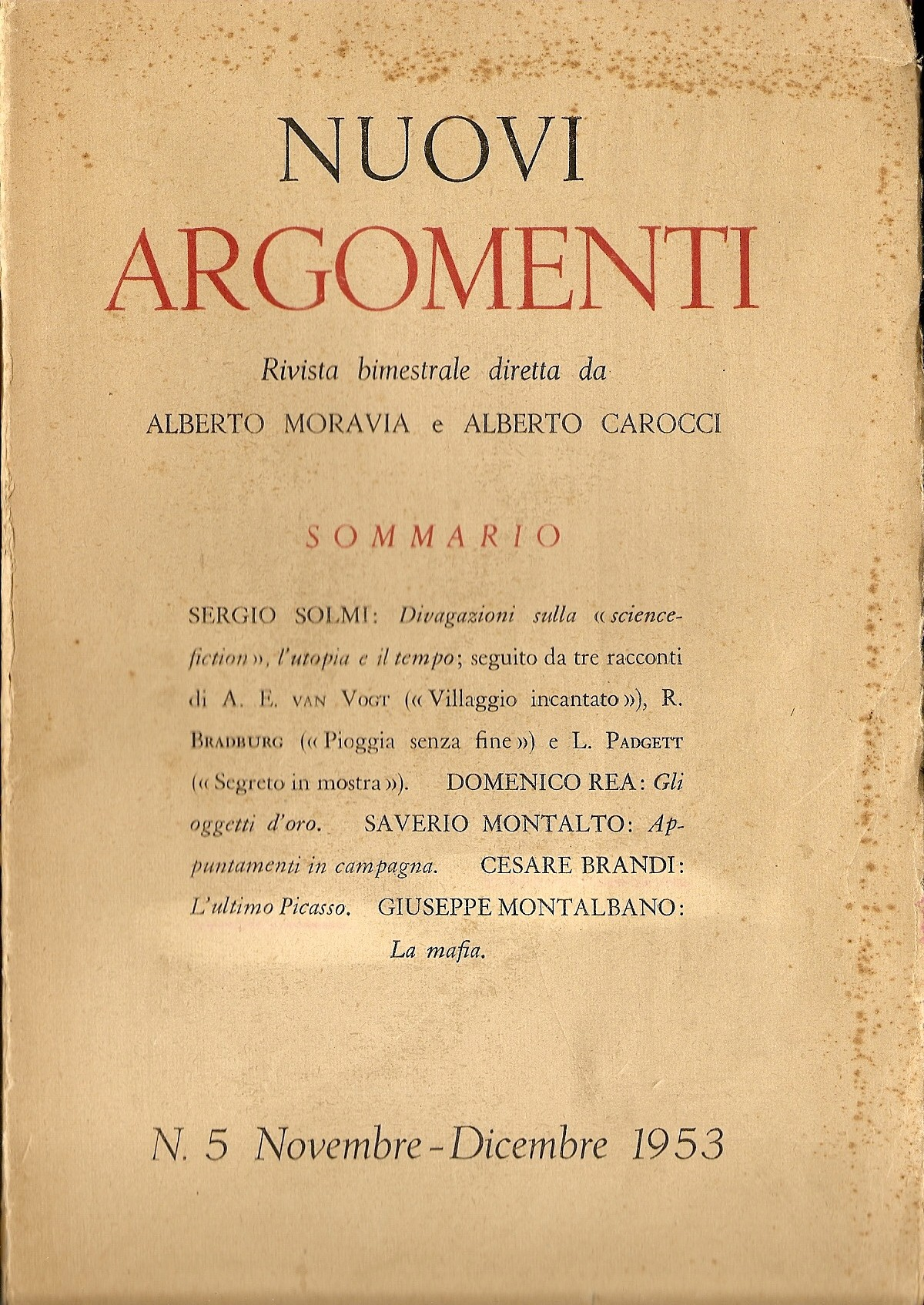
Nuovi Argomenti of 1953 No. 5.

== History and profile ==
Nuovi Argomenti was founded by Alberto Carrocci and Alberto Moravia in Rome in 1953. Soon, they were joined by Pier Paolo Pasolini. He coedited the magazine with Moravia. During this period, the magazine was published on a bimonthly basis.

Following the deaths of Pasolini and Carrocci, they were replaced by Attilio Bertolucci and Enzo Siciliano. The current editor is Dacia Maraini, who took the place of Enzo Siciliano after his death in 2006.

Since 1998, Nuovi Argomenti has been published by Mondadori which relaunched it as a quarterly with a new look and an updated format. The magazine started its online version on 12 March 2013.

== See also ==
- List of magazines in Italy
