= The Gospel According to St. Matthew (film) =

1964 film about Jesus Christ, directed by Pier Paolo Pasolini

The Gospel According to Matthew
- Original Italian release poster
- Italian: Il Vangelo secondo Matteo
- Directed by: Pier Paolo Pasolini
- Screenplay by: Pier Paolo Pasolini
- Based on: Gospel of Matthew
- Produced by: Alfredo Bini
- Starring: Enrique Irazoqui; Margherita Caruso; Susanna Pasolini; Marcello Morante; Mario Socrate; Settimio Di Porto
- Cinematography: Tonino Delli Colli
- Edited by: Nino Baragli
- Music by: Luis Enríquez Bacalov
- Production companies: Arco Film; Lux Compagnie Cinématographique
- Distributed by: Titanus Distribuzione (Italy); Lux Compagnie Cinématographique (France)
- Release dates: 4 September 1964 (Venice); 2 October 1964 (Italy); 3 March 1965 (France)
- Running time: 137 minutes
- Countries: Italy; France
- Language: Italian

The Gospel According to St. Matthew (Italian: Il Vangelo secondo Matteo) is a 1964 epic biblical drama film, written and directed by Pier Paolo Pasolini. It is a cinematic rendition of the story of Jesus according to the Gospel of Matthew, from the Nativity through the Resurrection.

In the neorealist tradition, the film employed a cast of mostly amateur actors, and was filmed entirely on-location throughout Southern Italy. The dialogue is taken directly from the Gospel of Matthew, as Pasolini felt that "images could never reach the poetic heights of the text." He reportedly chose Matthew's Gospel over the others because he felt "John was too mystical, Mark too vulgar, and Luke too sentimental."

The Gospel According to St. Matthew premiered on 4 September 1964 at the 25th Venice International Film Festival, where it won the Grand Jury Prize and three Nastro d'Argento Awards, including Best Director. It was nominated for three Oscars—Best Art Direction, Best Costume Design and Best Score. In 2015, the Vatican City newspaper L'Osservatore Romano called it the best film on Christ ever made. The film is considered a classic of world cinema and the neorealist genre.

== Plot ==
Note: The film lacks a conventional narrator, and assumes (or at least benefits from) familiarity with the story of Christ.

In Roman Galilee, the local Jewish community lives in poverty. Although the Romans are formally in charge, the Jewish upper class—including King Herod and the Pharisee religious elite—dominates the locals on a day-to-day basis.

The pregnant Mary has a troubled relationship with Joseph, who worries she cheated on him. Joseph reconciles with Mary after an angel tells him that God caused Mary's pregnancy. (Note: Matthew 1:18–1:25) After Mary bears Jesus Christ, the magi visit the baby Jesus. The angel tells the family to flee to Egypt. Herod—who fears a prophecy that Jesus will become king of the Jews—brutally massacres the region's infants. The family return to Judea after Herod dies. (Note: Matthew 2:1–1:23)

Many years later, John the Baptist preaches a brazenly anti-establishment message to the commoners of Galilee. (Note: Matthew 3:1–3:12) Jesus visits John to be baptized, and God appears to them. (Note: Matthew 3:13–3:17) Satan offers Jesus wealth and power, but Jesus declines. (Note: Matthew 4:1–4:11)

Jesus recruits a band of disciples. (Note: Matthew 4:18–4:22, 9:9, 10:1-10:4) He warns them that "I came not to bring peace, but a sword" and that they will suffer on his behalf. (Note: Matthew 10:16–10:39) He travels around the country with his disciples, healing the blind, raising the dead, exorcising demons, and proclaiming the arrival of the Kingdom of God and the promised salvation. (Note: Matthew 4:23–4:25) The film rapidly canvasses his parables and sayings, including the Sermon on the Mount, in a series of montaged monologues. (Note: Matthew 5, 6, 7) Meanwhile, the new king imprisons John the Baptist before capriciously executing him to impress his stepdaughter. (Note: Matthew 4:12, 14:1-14:12)

Jesus is generally uncomfortable showing his divine power in public (with the exception of the miracle of the loaves and fishes). (Note: Matthew 8:1–8:4, 12:15-12:21, 14:13-14:33, 16:20, 21:18-21:22) He prefers to preach radical messages to working-class crowds and children. (Note: Matthew 9:35–9:38, 11:25-11:30, 18:1-18:5, 18:10-18:14, 23:1-23:39) The wealthy are alienated by Jesus's socially conscious teachings, the religious elite are threatened by his contempt for their legalism and hypocrisy, and even commoners are concerned with his asceticism. (Note: Matthew 8:18–8:22, 12:1-12:14, 12:22-12:50, 18:6-18:9, 18:21-18:22, 19:16-19:24, 21:12-21:13, 21:23-21:46, 22:15-22:40) Matthew is wounded when Jesus chooses Peter over him to lead the church, but accepts Jesus's decision. (Note: Matthew 16:13–16:20)

Although the public—which wants to see the supernatural—initially ignores Jesus, (Note: Matthew 11:1–11:24, 14:53-14:58) he attracts a large following and triumphantly enters Jerusalem to cheering crowds. (Note: Matthew 21:1–21:11) The Roman army is called in for crowd control and beats several followers of Jesus.

After Jesus claims to be the Jews's prophesied Messiah, the chief priests plot to murder him. (Note: Matthew 26:1–26:5) Judas Iscariot betrays Jesus after Jesus scolds him in front of the other disciples. (Note: Matthew 26:6–26:16) During the Agony in the Garden, Jesus accepts his fate, which he has long known. (Note: Matthew 16:21–16:28, 26:36-26:46) The chief priests organize a mob to arrest Jesus. The apostles rise to defend him, but Jesus insists on surrendering peacefully. (Note: Matthew 26:47–26:56) The chief priests hand Jesus over to the Romans. (Note: Matthew 26:57–26:68) Fearing a similar fate, Peter denies Jesus three times. After escaping, he breaks down crying. (Note: Matthew 26:31–26:35, 26:69-26:75) Judas commits suicide after realizing even the priests are disgusted by his treachery. (Note: Matthew 27:1–27:10)

The Roman governor, Pilate, declares Jesus innocent but executes him anyway to placate the chief priests. (Note: Matthew 27:11–27:53) Mary buries her son. (Note: Matthew 27:57–27:61) After three days, Jesus rises from the dead and instructs his disciples to spread the gospel throughout the world. (Note: Matthew 28)

== Cast ==
- Enrique Irazoqui as Jesus
- Margherita Caruso as Mary, mother of Jesus
  - Susanna Pasolini as older Mary
- Marcello Morante as Joseph
- Mario Socrate as John the Baptist
- Settimio Di Porto as Peter
- Alfonso Gatto as Andrew
- Luigi Barbini as James
- Giacomo Morante as John
- Giorgio Agamben as Philip
- Guido Cerretani as Bartholomew
- Rosario Migale as Thomas
- Ferruccio Nuzzo as Matthew
- Marcello Galdini as James, son of Alphaeus
- Elio Spaziani as Jude
- Enzo Siciliano as Simon
- Otello Sestili as Judas Iscariot
- Rodolfo Wilcock as Caiaphas
- Alessandro Tasca as Pontius Pilate
- Amerigo Bevilacqua as Herod the Great
- Francesco Leonetti as Herod Antipas
- Franca Cupane as Herodias
- Paola Tedesco as Salome
- Rossana Di Rocco as Angel of the Lord
- Renato Terra as Legion
- Eliseo Boschi as Joseph of Arimathea
- Natalia Ginzburg as Mary of Bethany
- Silvio Citti as Stephaton
- Ninetto Davoli as a shepherd

== Production ==
=== Background ===
According to Barth David Schwartz's book Pasolini Requiem (1992), the impetus for the film took place in 1962. Pasolini had accepted Pope John XXIII's invitation for a new dialogue with non-Catholic artists, and subsequently visited the town of Assisi to attend a seminar at a Franciscan monastery there. The papal visit caused traffic jams in the town, leaving Pasolini confined to his hotel room; there, he came across a copy of the New Testament. Pasolini read all four Gospels straight through, and he claimed that adapting a film from one of them "threw in the shade all the other ideas for work I had in my head." He said that he decided to "remake the Gospel by analogy".

Pasolini had the idea to not reproduce exactly a historic, casual Christ, but rather projecting the present-day society of southern Italy onto that figure, a Christ after 2,000 years of narrative build-up. As he explained,

Along with this method of reconstruction by analogy, we find the idea of myth and epics [...] so when narrating the history of Christ, I did not reconstruct Christ such as he actually was. If I had reconstructed Christ's history as it actually was, I would not have made a religious film, since I am not a believer. I do not think Christ was God's son. I would have made a positivist or Marxist reconstruction if any, so at the best of cases, a life of one of the five or six thousands saints preaching at that moment in Palestine. However, I did not want to do that, I am not interested in profanations: that is just a fashion I loathe, it is petit bourgeois. I want to consecrate things again, because that is possible, I want to re-mythologize them. I did not want to reconstruct the life of Christ as it really was, I wanted to make the history of Christ plus two thousand years of Christian storytelling about the life of Christ, since it is the two thousands years of Christian history that have mythologized this biography, one that as such would have been virtually insignificant otherwise. My film is the life of Christ after two thousands years of stories on the life of Christ. That is what I had in mind.

The film was dedicated to John XXIII. The announcement at the opening credits reads that it is "dedicato alla cara, lieta, familiare memoria di Giovanni XXIII" ("dedicated to the dear, joyous, familiar memory of Pope John XXIII"). Pasolini was particularly critical with the new Pope Paul VI (1963), at a moment when he was drafting a storyboard for a follow-up to the film, this time on Paul the Apostle. The project due for 1966–1967 never took off, but it was advanced.

The film was co-produced by Arco Films and French company Lux Compagnie Cinématographique.

=== Motives and blasphemy prosecution ===
During the pre-production process, Pasolini attracted controversy when the figure of Christ appeared in his short film La ricotta, part of the omnibus film RoGoPaG. Pasolini was prosecuted and convicted of attacking the state religion (Catholicism was the sole state religion of Italy until 1984). He received a suspended prison sentence. Nonetheless, he continued making the Matthew film. Pasolini was well-known for being an atheist, a homosexual, and a Marxist. It has been speculated that the real motive for his prosecution may have been to preemptively discredit him in front of Catholic audiences, in case The Gospel proved to be iconoclastic. Due to the controversy, Pasolini strengthened the disclaimer at the start of La ricotta, saying that he believed the Passion of Christ was "the greatest [story] that ever took place."

At a press conference in 1966, Pasolini was asked why he, an unbeliever, had made a film which dealt with religious themes. He responded that "If you know that I am an unbeliever, then you know me better than I do myself. I may be an unbeliever, but I am an unbeliever who has a nostalgia for a belief." Therefore, he sets his criticism against a backdrop of sheer religious concern for the role assumed by the Church, the organization, for centuries.

=== Casting ===
In Italian neorealist style, most of the actors Pasolini hired were non-professionals. Enrique Irazoqui (Jesus) was a 19-year-old economics student from Spain and a communist activist who met Pasolini through Elsa Morante. Irazoqui initially did not want to play the role for ideological reasons, but was convinced by Morante and a local leftist writer named Giorgio Manacorda, who told him to play a "Gramscian" Christ. Irazoqui donated his entire acting salary to anti-Franco causes, and was targeted by the Falangist government upon his return to Spain for his participation in the film.

For the young Mary, Pasolini hired 14-year-old Margherita Caruso. He was looking for a woman who looked "naturally 'of the people'/commoner as they say; like thousands you see, with their faded clothes ... destined to be nothing but living humility." For the elderly Mary, Pasolini cast his own mother, Susanna, who had herself lost a son (Pasolini's brother, a resistance fighter during World War II).

The rest of the cast were mainly locals from Barile, Matera, and Massafra, where the film was shot. The cast also included noted intellectuals such as writers Enzo Siciliano, Alfonso Gatto, and Natalia Ginzburg, poet Rodolfo Wilcock, and philosopher Giorgio Agamben.

Much of the dialogue was overdubbed by professional voice actors in post-production. For example, Irazoqui was dubbed by stage and screen actor Enrico Maria Salerno.

=== Filming ===
Pasolini intentionally shot the film in Italy. He visited the Holy Land but found the locations unsuitable and "commercialized." In addition, he commented that Israel's landscape was simply too modern and industrialized to stand in for the time of Christ. Pasolini's location scouting in the Holy Land is documented in the adjoining feature-length documentary Location Hunting in Palestine, released a year later. For Mary and Joseph's working-class home, Pasolini used the real-life cave dwellings of the Sassi di Matera.

Pasolini described his experience filming The Gospel According to Matthew as very different from his previous films. He stated that while his shooting style on his previous film Accattone was "reverential," when his shooting style was applied to a biblical source it "came out rhetorical. ... And then when I was shooting the baptism scene near Viterbo I threw over all my technical preconceptions. I started using the zoom, I used new camera movements, new frames which were not reverential, but almost documentary [combining] an almost classical severity with the moments that are almost Godardian, for example in the two trials of Christ shot like 'cinema verite.' ... The Point is that ... I, a non-believer, was telling the story through the eyes of a believer. The mixture at the narrative level produced the mixture stylistically."

== Style ==
=== Relationship with the source material ===
Unlike previous cinematic depictions of Jesus' life, Pasolini's film does not embellish the biblical account with any literary or dramatic inventions, nor does it present an amalgam of the four Gospels (subsequent films which would adhere as closely as possible to one Gospel account are 1979's Jesus, based on the Gospel of Luke, and 2003's The Gospel of John).

Every word of dialogue in the film is drawn from the Gospel of Matthew. However, not every scene or inference is drawn from Matthew. For example, Matthew does not say which disciple Jesus told off during the Anointing; only John says that it was Judas (John 12). From John's detail, Pasolini draws the inference that "Jesus's manipulation of his disciples' feelings for him directly spurs Judas's betrayal." The detail that Mary was present at the Crucifixion is also drawn from John, not Matthew (John 19). Pasolini also focuses on scenes to which Matthew gives comparatively limited attention, such as the massacre of the innocents.

Although the film's dialogue is drawn directly from the Gospel, it is not a word-for-word recreation of the text, and Pasolini took several artistic liberties. The film deletes 592 of Matthew's 1070 verses, and rearranges scenes from the narrative at least seventeen times. In particular, Pasolini omits Matthew's genealogy of Jesus, the eschatological material in chapters 24 and 25, "sixteen of Jesus' nineteen parables, and fifteen of his eighteen miracles." Christopher Fuller writes that "[t]he result is that The Gospel strips Jesus of his otherworldly status and situates him as an inhabitant of the present material world rather than the divine realm." George Aichele adds that "any careful reader will see important differences between Matthew's and Pasolini's Jesuses. ... [A]lthough the movie's Jesus is undoubtedly a prophet, he has little interest in the end of the world. Like any revolutionary, he would rather change it."

=== Anachronisms and lack of ornamentation ===
Pasolini employed many of the techniques of Italian neorealism in the making of his film. The British Film Institute commented that the neorealist approach gave the film a "lack of awed formality and soft-focus sentiment that sets it apart from Hollywood Bible studies." Due to the film's minimalist style and lack of narration, it has been said that "one must either already know the story or have a sharp eye for visual storytelling to fully understand everything that is going on."

The film is not purely naturalistic; many of its key stylistic decisions were anachronistic and unconventional. In addition to the original biblical source, Pasolini used references to "2,000 years of Christian painting and sculptures" throughout the film. The look of the characters is also eclectic and, in some cases, anachronistic, resembling artistic depictions of different eras (the costumes of the Roman soldiers and the Pharisees, for example, are influenced by Renaissance art, whereas Jesus' appearance has been likened to that in Byzantine art as well as the work of Expressionist artist Georges Rouault). Pasolini's use of historical anachronisms would carry over to some his following films like Oedipus Rex. As the British Film Institute later put it, the point of Pasolini's culturally omnivorous and anachronistic style "was that our knowledge of Christ's life comes down to us through 2000 years of art, and it is pointless to try and pretend otherwise."

The score of the film, arranged by Luis Enríquez Bacalov, is eclectic; ranging from Johann Sebastian Bach (e.g. Mass in B Minor and St Matthew Passion) to Odetta ("Sometimes I Feel Like a Motherless Child"), to Blind Willie Johnson ("Dark Was the Night, Cold Was the Ground"), to the Jewish ceremonial declaration "Kol Nidre" and the "Gloria" from the Congolese Missa Luba. Pasolini stated that all of the film's music was of a sacred or religious nature from all parts of the world and multiple cultures or belief systems. Bacalov also composed several original musical tracks.

== Reception ==
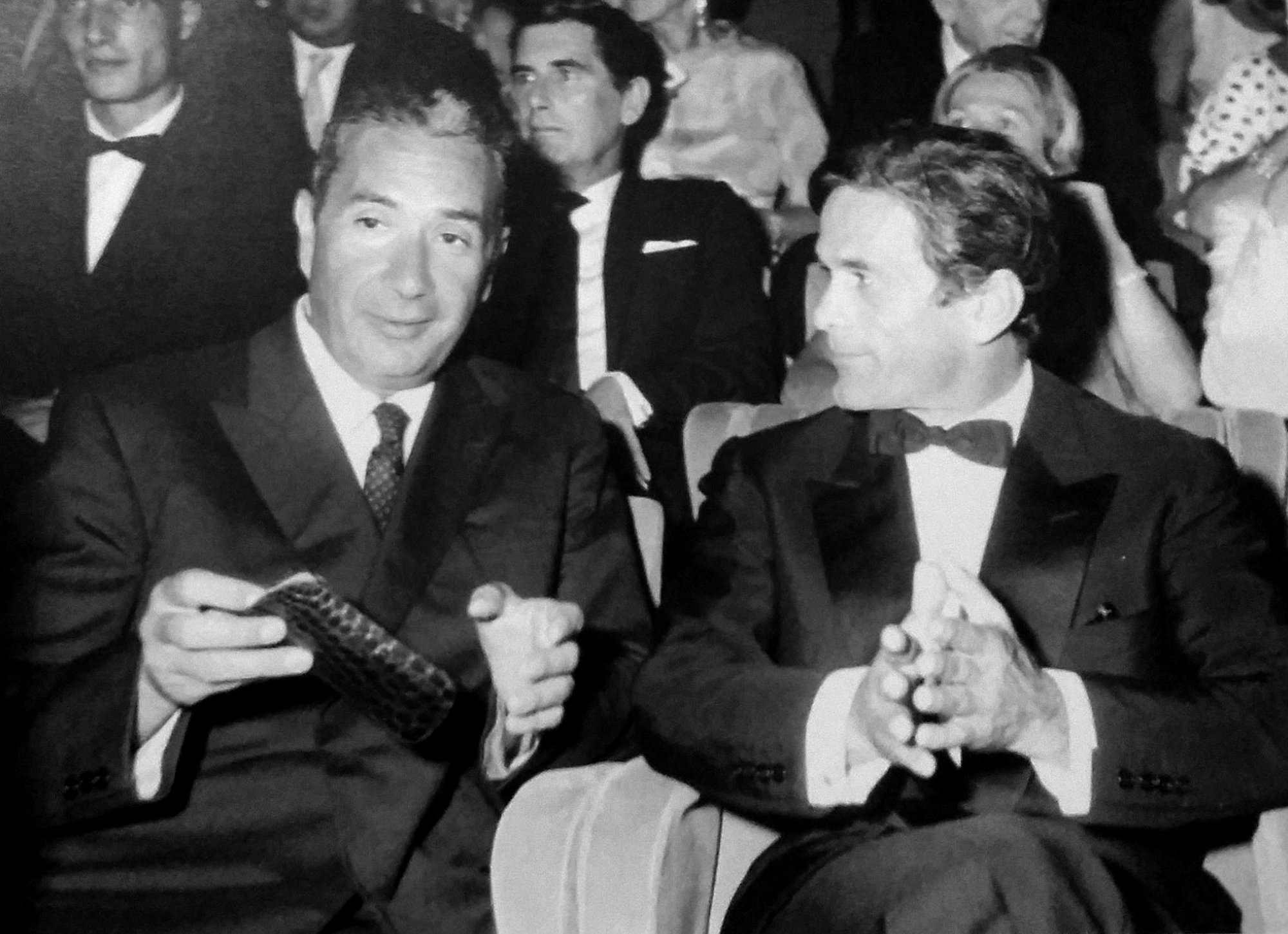
Italian Prime Minister Aldo Moro and Pier Paolo Pasolini together in Venice at the premiere of the movie in 1964.

The film received mostly positive reviews from critics, including several Christian critics. Philip French called it "a noble film," and Alexander Walker said that "it grips the historical and psychological imagination like no other religious film I have seen. And for all its apparent simplicity, it is visually rich and contains strange, disturbing hints and undertones about Christ and his mission."

Some left-wing film critics, however, wrote unfavorable reviews. Oswald Stack criticized the film's "abject concessions to reactionary ideology." In response to criticism from the left, Pasolini admitted that, in his opinion, "there are some horrible moments I am ashamed of. ... The Miracle of the loaves and the fishes and Christ walking on water are disgusting pietism." He also stated that the film was "a reaction against the conformity of Marxism. The mystery of life and death and of suffering – and particularly of religion ... is something that Marxists do not want to consider. But these are and have always been questions of great importance for human beings." Jean-Paul Sartre reportedly told Pasolini that "Stalin rehabilitated Ivan the Terrible; Christ is not yet rehabilitated by Marxists."

Noted admirers of the film include directors Andrei Tarkovsky, who called it "genius", and Martin Scorsese, who instructed the cast and crew of his own Biblical film The Last Temptation of Christ to view it.

The Gospel According to Matthew was ranked number 10 (in 2010) and number 7 (in 2011) in the Arts and Faith website's Top 100 Films, also is in the Vatican's list of 45 great films and Roger Ebert's Great Movies list. Forty years later, Ebert remarked that The Gospel According to Matthew and The Passion of the Christ were the only two religious films he had ever seen "that really seem[] to deal with what actually happened" with Jesus's death.

On Rotten Tomatoes the film has an approval rating of 92%, based on 36 reviews, and an average rating of 8.6 out of 10, with the critics consensus saying "The Gospel According to St. Matthew forgoes the pageantry of biblical epics in favor of a naturalistic retelling of the Christ story, achieving a respectful if not reverent interpretation with political verve."

=== Awards and nominations ===
At the 25th Venice International Film Festival, The Gospel According to Matthew was screened in competition for the Golden Lion, and won the OCIC Award and the Silver Lion. At the film's premiere, a crowd gathered to boo Pasolini but cheered him after the film was over. The film later won the Grand Prize at the International Catholic Film Office.

The film was nominated for the UN Award at the 21st British Academy Film Awards.

The Gospel According to Matthew was released in the United States in 1966 and was nominated for three Academy Awards: Art Direction (Luigi Scaccianoce), Costume Design (Danilo Donati), and Score.

== Alternate versions ==
The 2007 Region 1 DVD release from Legend Films features a colourised, English-dubbed version of the film, in addition to the original, black-and-white Italian-language version. (The English-dubbed version is significantly shorter than the original, with a running time of 91 minutes – roughly 40 minutes shorter than the standard version.)

== See also ==
- List of Easter films
- List of films about angels
