= Luigi Scaccianoce =

Italian production designer (1914–1981)

- Born: July 12, 1914; Venice, Veneto, Kingdom of Italy
- Died: October 18, 1981 (aged 67); Rome, Italy
- Occupation: Production designer
- Years active: 1945–1980

Luigi Scaccianoce (July 12, 1914, in Venice, Italy – October 18, 1981) was an Italian production designer, art director and set decorator. He was nominated for an Academy Award for Best Art Direction for his work in The Gospel According to St. Matthew (1964).

== Selected filmography ==
- The Temptress (1952)
- The Wanderers (1956)
- Eva (1962)
- The Gospel According to Matthew (1964)
- The Hawks and the Sparrows (1966)
- Oedipus Rex (1967)
