= The New Gospel =

2020 film

- Directed by: Milo Rau
- Screenplay by: Milo Rau
- Starring: Yvan Sagnet; Maia Morgenstern; Enrique Irazoqui; Marcello Fonte
- Cinematography: Thomas Eirich-Schneider
- Edited by: Katja Dringenberg
- Music by: Vinicio Capossela; Elia Rediger
- Release date: 2020
- Language: German

The New Gospel (German: Das Neue Evangelium) is a 2020 docudrama film written and directed by Milo Rau. A co-production between Germany, Switzerland and Italy, the film premiered at the 77th edition of the Venice Film Festival.

== Cast ==
- Yvan Sagnet as Jesus
- Maia Morgenstern as Mother Mary
- Enrique Irazoqui as John the Baptist
- Marcello Fonte as Pontius Pilate

== Production ==
The film is the second chapter of part of Rau's Trilogy of Ancient Myths, between Orestes in Mosul and Antigone in the Amazon. It was shot in Matera, Basilicata. Rau got the idea for the film after visiting the city in 2019 for an UNESCO initiative, and noting the critical conditions of the immigrants who lived there. He then decided to retell the passion of Jesus as the fight of an immigrant who for their peers' rights, and chose for the role the political activist Yvan Sagnet.

The film was co-produced by Fruitmarket, Lang Film and Rau's company International Institute for Political Murder.

== Release ==
The film premiered at the 77th Venice International Film Festival, in the Giornate degli Autori sidebar.
