= Marcello Morante =

Italian lawyer, journalist and playwright (1916–2005)

- Born: 18 October 1916; Rome, Kingdom of Italy
- Died: 18 August 2005 (aged 88); Grosseto, Italy
- Education: Sapienza University of Rome
- Occupations: Lawyer, magistrate, journalist, playwright
- Children: Laura Morante

Marcello Morante (18 October 1916 – 18 August 2005) was an Italian lawyer, journalist, politician and playwright. He was the younger brother of writer Elsa Morante and father of actress Laura Morante.

== Life and career ==
Born in Rome in 1916, Morante was the third of four children. His childhood was marked by frequent tensions between his mother Irma and his sister Elsa. In 1933, he moved with his mother to Sicily and attended the Liceo Pennisi in Catania. Returning to Rome, Morante graduated in law in 1938 and then passed the judicial examination, becoming Italy's youngest magistrate. He was appointed to the court of Vicenza in October 1939.

During World War II, Morante served as an officer in the Italian Army between 1939 and 1942. He later resumed his judicial career in Venice and, following the 1943 armistice, he opposed the Fascist authorities as a magistrate, ordering the release of several people who had been arbitrarily imprisoned. After learning that Fascist forces were searching for him, he fled with his wife to Tuscany, eventually settling in Scansano, where he remained until the liberation of Grosseto in June 1944. He left the judiciary in 1945 to practise as a lawyer, a profession he continued until 1986.

Initially a member of the Italian Liberal Party, he later joined the Italian Republican Party, serving as provincial secretary and editor of the newspaper Etruria Nuova. He also wrote for La Voce repubblicana from 1949 to 1952. In June 1951, he was elected to the Grosseto City Council, but resigned in December 1952 after leaving the party in order to participate in the formation of Popular Unity, alongside figures including Ferruccio Parri, Francesco Chioccon, Luciano Bianciardi, and Carlo Cassola. He also became a regular contributor of La Gazzetta, a Communist-oriented newspaper based in Livorno. In 1956, he was elected municipal councillor with the Italian Socialist Party.

In 1964, Morante appeared as Joseph in Pier Paolo Pasolini's film The Gospel According to St. Matthew.

He directed Grosseto's Experimental Theatre until 1985, authoring approximately 70 plays, including In nome del cappellaio and Una sera nell'orto. In 1980, he won the Italian Drama Institute award with Lo sconosciuto chiamato Isabella. His other publications included Maledetta Benedetta (1986), Dialogo con l'eterosessuale (1993) and Nudo e sporco (2000). In 1989, he founded and directed the periodical Nero su Bianco.

Morante died in Grosseto on 18 August 2005.

== Sources ==
- Betti, Laura; Gulinucci, Michele, eds. (1991). Le regole di un'illusione: i film, il cinema. Associazione Fondo Pier Paolo Pasolini.
- Bonifazi, Emilio (2016). Grosseto e i suoi amministratori dal 1944 al 2015. Grosseto: SEMAR.
- Gandolfi, Michele, ed. (2026). La scoperta della provincia. Cultura e intellettuali in Toscana nel secondo dopoguerra. Milan: ExCogita.
- Turbanti, Adolfo, ed. (1995). Movimento di Unità Popolare e crisi del centrismo. Florence: Giunti.
