= Enzo Siciliano =

Italian writer (1934–2006)

Enzo Siciliano (27 May 1934 – 9 June 2006) was an Italian writer, playwright, literary critic and intellectual.

Siciliano was born in Rome. He was a collaborator of Alberto Moravia, Pier Paolo Pasolini, Elsa Morante and many other famous writers in the 1950s and 1960s.

From 1996 to 1998, he was President of RAI (Italian State Television). He died in Rome in 2006, aged 72, from complications of diabetes.

== Selected bibliography ==
=== Novels ===
- La coppia (1966)
- La principessa e l’antiquario (1980)
- Carta blu (1992)
- I bei momenti (1997, premio Strega)
- Non entrare nel campo degli orfani (2002)

=== Theatre ===
- La casa scoppiata (1986)
- La vittima (1987)

=== Criticism ===
- Prima della poesia (1965)
- Autobiografia letteraria (1970)
- Vita di Pasolini (1978)
- Letteratura italiana ("Italian Literature", 3 vol., 1986–88)

== Filmography ==
Year	Title	Role	Notes
1964	The Gospel According to St. Matthew	Simone	
1968	La coppia	Director	
1979	La Luna	Orchestra Conductor in Rome	Uncredited, (final film role)
