= Ro.Go.Pa.G. =

- Directed by: Jean-Luc Godard (segment "Il Nuovo mondo") Ugo Gregoretti (segment "Il Pollo ruspante"); Pier Paolo Pasolini (segment "La Ricotta") Roberto Rossellini (segment "Illibatezza")
- Written by: see directors
- Produced by: Alfredo Bini; Angelo Rizzoli
- Starring: Orson Welles; Laura Betti; Rosanna Schiaffino; Gianrico Tedeschi; Ugo Tognazzi; Edmonda Aldini
- Music by: Carlo Rustichelli
- Production company: Arco Film
- Distributed by: CINERIZ – Rizzoli Film
- Release date: 19 February 1963 (Italy)
- Running time: 122 minutes
- Country: Italy
- Language: Italian

Ro.Go.Pa.G. (also known as "RoGoPaG") is a 1963 film consisting of four segments, each written and directed by a different director. These include the French director Jean-Luc Godard (segment "Il nuovo mondo") and the Italian directors Ugo Gregoretti (segment "Il pollo ruspante"), Pier Paolo Pasolini (segment "La ricotta") and Roberto Rossellini (segment "Illibatezza").

The movie title is an abbreviation of the authors' last names: Rossellini, Godard, Pasolini, Gregoretti.

== Synopsis ==
=== Illibatezza ===
Illibatezza ("Chastity") by Roberto Rossellini is a story of a beautiful stewardess who attracts unwanted attention from one of the air travelers – a middle aged American. By chance, the two stay in the same hotel overnight. She has a fiancé back home, to whom she sends 8mm films made with her camera. These show how, in order to shoo away the unwanted flirtatious attentions of the traveler, all she had to do was to act in an aggressively provocative way; his sexual attraction being fueled by the shyness with which she initially tried to endure his advances.

=== Il nuovo mondo ===
Il nuovo mondo ("The New World") by Jean-Luc Godard is set in Paris and shows a young couple during a short period after the explosion of a nuclear bomb 120 km over Paris. The city is unaffected by it but the man begins to notice changes in the behaviour of the people in general and in that of his girl friend in particular in the period after the explosion: e.g. her inability to keep up a coherent conversation and a loss of logic. He himself is not affected, but does not know why. The media reports that the explosion has not resulted in negative after effects. The man realizes this is not true and decides to write down his observations.

=== La ricotta ===
Pasolini's La ricotta ("Curd Cheese") tells the story of filming a movie about the crucifixion of Jesus Christ at a slightly hilly waste ground near a residential area. The main character is a simple man playing a bit part – one of the two men who were crucified with Christ, in particular the one who asks Christ to take him in heaven. After giving his own rations to his wife and children, he finds himself hungry. Disguised in women's clothing and a wig he sneaks some more rations. Before he can eat it however he has to film his scene and so hides it. When he gets back however, he discovers that the dog belonging to the film's star has found his hiding place. Subsequent to this he sells the dog to a reporter and buys enough curd cheese and bread to feed himself. At the end, he dies from gastric congestion on the cross while filming.

When the film director (Orson Welles) is interviewed by a reporter, he calls the reporter an average man and conformist, telling him that if he should die right now, it would be a nice plot development. He then reads to the reporter from Pasolini's book titled Mamma Roma.

=== Il pollo ruspante ===
Gregoretti's Il pollo ruspante ("Free Range Chicken") shows an Italian middle-class family with two children traveling via an autostrada (highway) to the site of a real-estate project where they could be interested in buying a detached house.

While they do, a laringotomized marketing executive presents a lecture to a businessmen's seminar, reciting passage after passage in an impersonal, mechanical tone through a vocalizing apparatus.

The lecturer teaches the businessmen how to "stimulate consumption" via the substitution of small shops (where the customer was forced to talk to the shop-owner and so was allowed time to rationalize each buying action) with large supermarkets, where people could more easily give over to their instincts, grabbing frivolous or useless articles from the shelves on a whim due to the delay of the moment of bill presentation and payment.

The family visits a highway service station with an adjoining supermarket and restaurant. In the supermarket the children clamor to have candies and toys bought for them and the parents give in for fear of "letting people think they're poor"; then they all sit down to consume a drab standardized meal where the father can't convince the waitress to bring him "just one egg" (since all the portions must contain two) and has to explain to his children the difference between battery-bred chicken and free ranging ones (in itself a metaphor of regimented urban life compared to the rougher, but freer, rural existence).

The family finally reaches the development site where an enthusiastic real estate agent pressures them to reserve a yet-to-be-built house while telling off the warden (a southern Italian, representing the agricultural past of Italy) for having planted cabbages and other vegetables in a small patch of land, trampling over it and destroying the plants. The lecture goes on, in a harrowing enunciation of tricks and strategies to push consumerism to ever higher heights, all exemplified in corpore vivo by the family's odyssey. Finally, when in the evening the family is getting back to Milan, the father having decided against buying the house, a car accident befalls them, probably killing them all.

The robot-voiced marketing executive concludes his exposition and is cheered by the businessmen' crowd, who congratulate him as they all leave the meeting room.
