= 25th Venice International Film Festival =

Italian film festival in 1964

- Location: Venice, Italy
- Founded: 1932
- Awards: Golden Lion: Red Desert by Michelangelo Antonioni
- Festival date: 27 August – 10 September 1964
- Website: Website

Venice Film Festival chronology
- 26th 24th

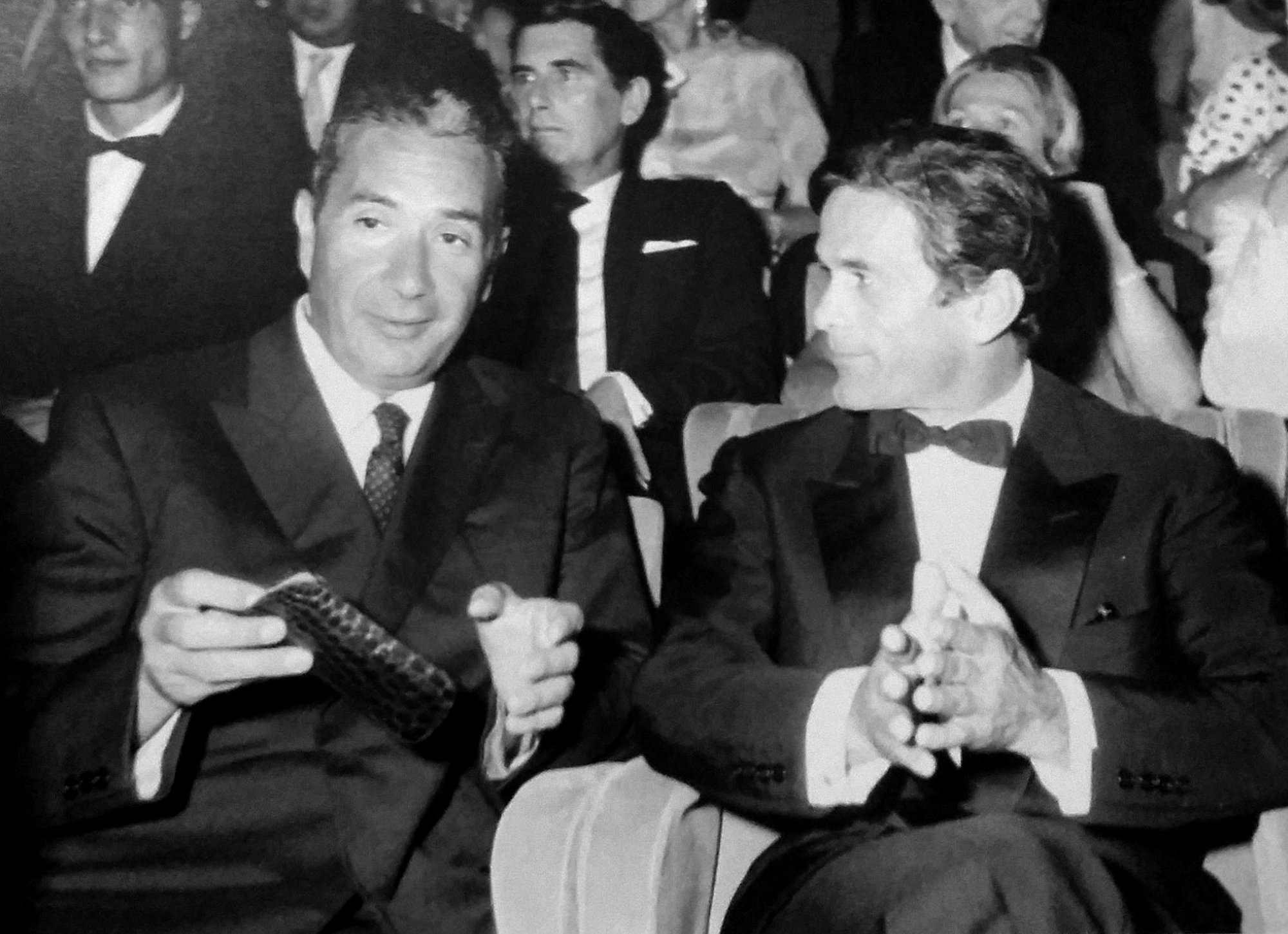
Aldo Moro and Pier Paolo Pasolini at the 1964, International Film Exhibition, Venice, at the presentation of the film The Gospel According to Matthew

The 25th annual Venice International Film Festival was held from 27 August to 10 September 1964.

Italian writer Mario Soldati was the jury president for the main competition. The Golden Lion was awarded to Red Desert, directed by Michelangelo Antonioni.

== Jury ==
- Mario Soldati, Italian writer - Jury President
- Rudolf Arnheim, American author
- Ove Brusendorff, Danish film historian
- Thorold Dickinson, British filmmaker
- Georges Sadoul, French writer
- Ricardo Muñoz Suay, Spanish director
- Jerzy Toeplitz, Polish film theorist

== Official Sections ==
The following films were selected to be screened:

=== In Competition ===
English title	Original title	Director(s)	Production country
Girl with Green Eyes		Desmond Davis	United Kingdom
The Gospel According to St. Matthew	Il vangelo secondo Matteo	Pier Paolo Pasolini	Italy
Hamlet	Гамлет	Grigori Kozintsev	Soviet Union
King & Country		Joseph Losey	United Kingdom
Life Upside Down	La vie à l'envers	Alain Jessua	France
To Love	Att Älska	Jörn Donner	Sweden
A Married Woman	Une femme mariée	Jean-Luc Godard	France
Nothing but a Man		Michael Roemer	United States
The Peach Thief	Kradetzat na praskovi	Vulo Radev	Bulgaria
Red Desert	Il deserto rosso	Michelangelo Antonioni	Italy
This Special Friendship	Les amitiés particulières	Jean Delannoy	France
Tonio Kröger		Rolf Thiele	West Germany

=== Out of Competition ===
English title	Original title	Director(s)	Production country
All These Women	För att inte tala om alla dessa kvinnor	Ingmar Bergman	Sweden
Woman Is a Wonderful Thing	La donna è una cosa meravigliosa	Mauro Bolognini	Italy

=== Afternoon Screenings ===
English title	Original title	Director(s)	Production country
Berlin - Kaiser to Khrushchev		Marshall Flaum	United States
Caroline		Georges Dufaux, Clément Perron	France
Crisis: Behind a Presidential Commitment		Robert Drew	United States
December 7th - The Day of Infamy		Marshall Flaum	United States
Faces of November		Robert Drew	United States
Happy Mother's Day		Joyce Chopra, Richard Leacock	United States
How to Succeed as a Gangster		Jack Haley Jr.	United States
In Search of Kim Novak		Jack Haley Jr.	United States
The Oppenheimer Enigma	L'enigma Oppenhemier	Leandro Castellani	Italy

== Official Awards ==
- Golden Lion: Red Desert by Michelangelo Antonioni
- Special Jury Prize:
  - Hamlet by Grigori Kozintsev
  - The Gospel According to St. Matthew by Pier Paolo Pasolini
- Volpi Cup for Best Actor: Tom Courtenay for King & Country
- Volpi Cup for Best Actress: Harriet Andersson for To Love
- Best First Work: La vie à l'envers by Alain Jessua

== Independent Awards ==
=== San Giorgio Prize ===
- Nothing But a Man by Michael Roemer

=== FIPRESCI Prize ===
- Red Desert by Michelangelo Antonioni

=== OCIC Award ===
- The Gospel According to St. Matthew by Pier Paolo Pasolini

=== Pasinetti Award ===
- La vie à l'envers by Alain Jessua
  - Parallel Sections: Passenger by Andrzej Munk

=== Lion of San Marco - Grand Prize ===
- Skoplje '63 by Veljko Bulajić
  - Best Documentary: L'enigma Oppenhemier by Leandro Castellani
