= Appunti per un film sull'India =

- Directed by: Pier Paolo Pasolini
- Written by: Pier Paolo Pasolini; Sergio Citti
- Produced by: Gianni Barcelloni
- Cinematography: Roberto Nappa; Federico Zanni
- Edited by: Jenner Menghi
- Music by: Ennio Morricone
- Release date: 18 August 1968 (Venice Film Festival)
- Running time: 34 minutes
- Country: Italy
- Language: Italian

Appunti per un film sull'India (English: Notes for a Film on India) is a 1968 short documentary film by Pier Paolo Pasolini where he visits India to do a recce for his proposed film with India as its background about a king who gives up his body to feed a starving tiger.

The film was shot around post-independent India when it was facing grave challenges of poverty, population and caste system. Pasolini narrates the challenges of India and its charms amidst all the problems the country faces. The 33-minute-long documentary is composed of short interviews from random people about their opinions on matters such as family planning. The documentary also shows short interviews of journalists and one politician about the challenges India faces in modernizing itself without becoming westernized or losing the Indian identity in the process.

The film opens and ends with a shot of a Sikh soldier, who, Pasolini identifies, in his commentary, as the one who would play the role of Maharaja in his film. Among others Pasolini interviewed for his film the former Maharaja of Bhavanagar and his wife and well-known Urdu story writer and filmmaker Rajinder Singh Bedi.

The documentary was shot in many places including New Delhi, Jaipur, Rishikesh and Varanasi etc.
