= Notes Towards an African Orestes =

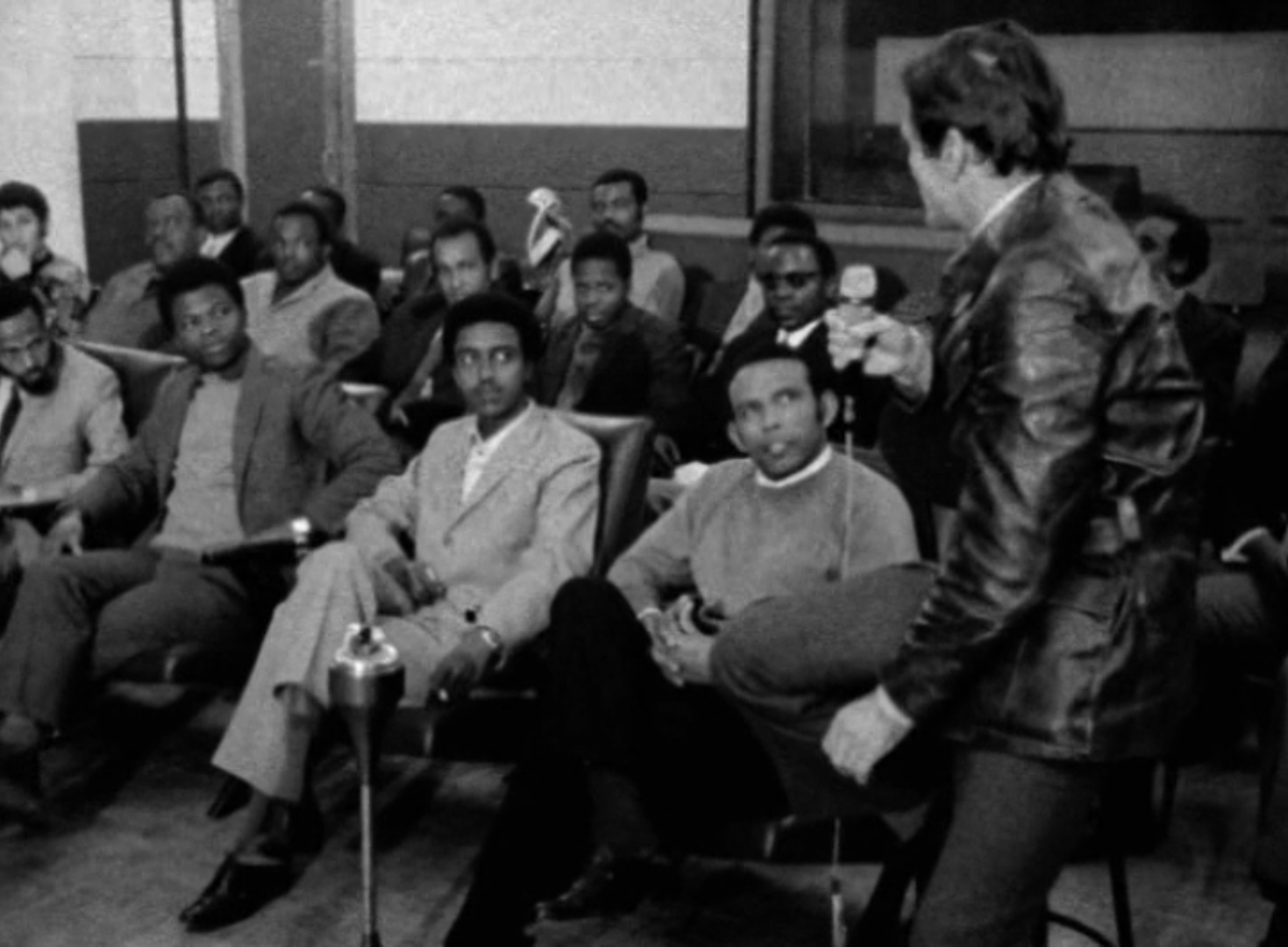
- Directed by: Pier Paolo Pasolini
- Written by: Pier Paolo Pasolini
- Produced by: Gian Vittorio Baldi
- Starring: Gato Barbieri
- Cinematography: Giorgio Pelloni
- Edited by: Cleofe Conversi
- Release date: 16 April 1970
- Running time: 65 minutes
- Country: Italy
- Language: Italian

Notes Towards an African Orestes (Italian: Appunti per un'Orestiade Africana) is a 1970 Italian film by director Pier Paolo Pasolini about Pasolini's preparations for making a film version of the Oresteia set in Africa.

== Content ==
The film starts as a cinematic notebook of Pasolini scouting locations and actors with a voice-over of his thoughts -- "perhaps this will be my Electra". Back in Rome, there is a sequence with a jazz group playing. He then invites a group of African students at the University of Rome to review his notes and comment. They politely but clearly tell Pasolini that the primeval Africa he imagined had little to do with the complex, diverse reality and that treating it as a primal setting for an ancient European story was foolish. They appear to be amusedly patronised by Pasolini's implication that social progress in Africa via the adoption of Western education systems should be distrusted in favour of his romanticised ideals of communal tribal systems and the dignity of labour.

The African Orestes was never made.

== Cast ==
- Gato Barbieri - Himself - Musician: saxophone
- Don Moye - Himself - Musician: drums
- Marcello Melio - Himself - Musician: double bass
- Yvonne Murray (singer) - Herself - singer
- Archie Savage - Himself - Singer
- Pier Paolo Pasolini - Himself (uncredited)

== Release ==
The film was screened at the 1976 Cannes Film Festival, but was not entered into the main competition.
