= Alfredo Bini =

Italian film producer

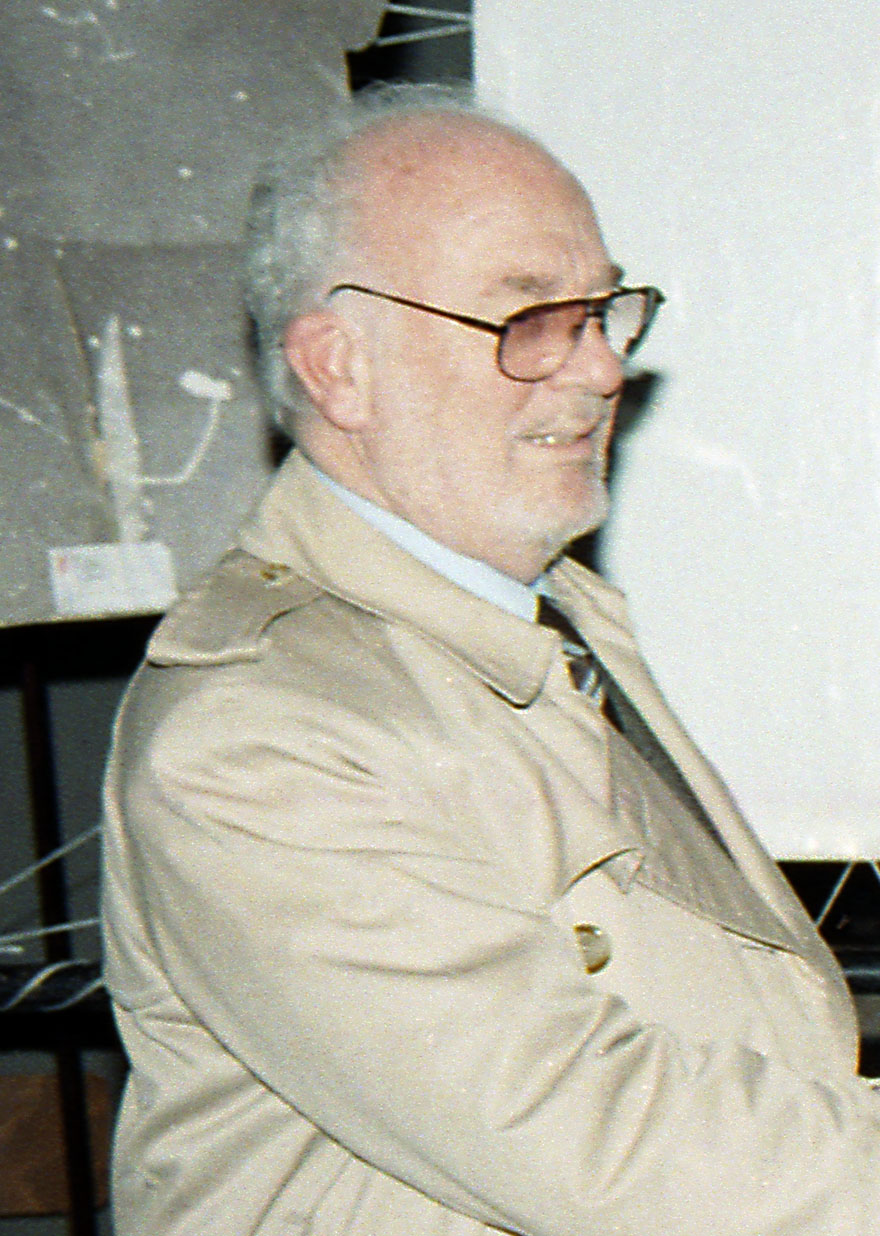
- Bini in 1997
- Born: 12 December 1926; Livorno, Italy
- Died: 16 October 2010 (aged 83); Tarquinia, Viterbo, Lazio, Italy
- Occupation: Film producer
- Years active: 1958–1979

Alfredo Bini (12 December 1926 – 16 October 2010) was an Italian film producer. He produced 32 films between 1958 and 1979. He was born in Livorno, Italy.

== Selected filmography ==
- The Law Is the Law (1958)
- Il bell'Antonio (1960)
- La Viaccia (1961)
- Accattone (1961)
- Mamma Roma (1962)
- Ro.Go.Pa.G. (1963)
- The Gospel According to St. Matthew (1964)
- El Greco (1966)
- The Hawks and the Sparrows (1966)
- Oedipus Rex (1967)
- Satyricon (1969)
