= Location Hunting in Palestine =

Sopralluoghi in Palestina per il vangelo secondo Matteo
- Directed by: Pier Paolo Pasolini
- Release date: 1965
- Running time: 55 minutes
- Country: Italy
- Language: Italian

Location Hunting in Palestine or Sopralluoghi in Palestina per il vangelo secondo Matteo is a 1965 Italian documentary film directed by Pier Paolo Pasolini.

Disappointed by the overly modern landscapes, Pasolini abandoned the idea of filming on the very sites where Christ lived. The film was ultimately shot in the Mezzogiorno (southern Italy).

== Synopsis ==
In 1963, Pasolini traveled to Palestine with Don Carraro in search of locations to film The Gospel According to St. Matthew, hoping to find places reminiscent of the original biblical world.

While traveling through the places where Christ preached, he recognized typical elements of the southern Italian countryside. Pasolini was surprised by the modernity of certain parts of Israel, such as Tel Aviv and the Israeli part of Jerusalem, which contrasted sharply with the archaic and impoverished villages of the Arab world.

== Technical Specifications ==
- French Title: Location Scouting in Palestine for The Gospel According to St. Matthew
- Original Title: Location Scouting in Palestine for The Gospel According to St. Matthew
- Directed and Written by: Pier Paolo Pasolini
- Cinematography: Otello Martelli, Aldo Pinelli
