= To Love (1964 film) =

- Directed by: Jörn Donner
- Written by: Jörn Donner
- Cinematography: Sven Nykvist
- Edited by: Lennart Wallén
- Music by: Bo Nilsson; Eje Thelin
- Release date: 1964
- Country: Sweden
- Language: Swedish

To Love (Swedish: Att Älska) is a 1964 Swedish drama film written and directed by Jörn Donner. For her performance Harriet Andersson was awarded Volpi Cup for Best Actress at the 25th Venice International Film Festival.

== Cast ==
- Harriet Andersson as Louise
- Zbigniew Cybulski as Fredrik
- Isa Quensel as Märta
- Thomas Svanfeldt as Jacob
- Nils Eklund as Vicar
- Jane Friedmann as Nora
- Jan Erik Lindqvist as Speaker
