= Enrique Irazoqui =

Spanish actor (1944–2020)

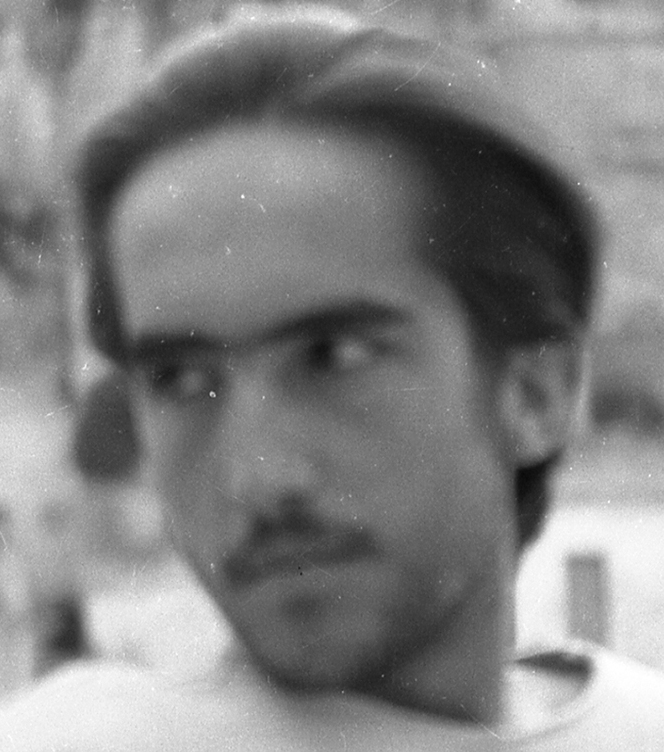
Irazoqui in 1963

Enrique Irazoqui (Spanish pronunciation: [enˈɾike iɾaˈθoki]; 5 July 1944 – 16 September 2020) was a Spanish professor of literature, computer chess expert and actor, best known for his role as Jesus Christ in the 1964 film The Gospel According to St. Matthew, directed by Pier Paolo Pasolini. He was 19 when he played the lead role in Pasolini's film and only had a small number of screen roles afterwards.

Irazoqui was born in Barcelona, the son of a Spanish father and an Italian Jewish mother. He received the Honorary Citizenship of the city of Matera, Italy, in 2011.

In 2002 he was the arbiter during the Brains in Bahrain chess match between world champion Vladimir Kramnik and the computer program Deep Fritz, which ended in a tie.

== Roles ==
- Jesus Christ in The Gospel According to St. Matthew, 1964, Italy, directed by Pier Paolo Pasolini
- Noche de vino tinto, 1966, Spain, directed by José María Nunes
- Dante no es únicamente severo, 1966, Spain, directed by Jacinto Esteva and Joaquim Jordà
- A la soledat, 2008, Spain, directed by José María Nunes
- St. John the Baptist in The New Gospel, 2020, Italy, directed by Milo Rau.
