= La ricotta =

La Ricotta
- Directed by: Pier Paolo Pasolini
- Written by: Pier Paolo Pasolini
- Starring: Orson Welles; Mario Cipriani; Laura Betti
- Release date: 1963
- Running time: 40 minutes
- Country: Italy

La ricotta (ricotta, a curd cheese) is a short film written and directed by Pier Paolo Pasolini in 1963 and is part of the omnibus film Ro.Go.Pa.G.

== Plot ==
In summary, the film deals with the film production of the Passion of Jesus with a director acting like Pasolini yet played by Orson Welles. The most biting social critique is shown through the main character of Stracci (meaning "rags"). Stracci is a poor and starving man who works as an extra (ironically, the "good thief") who is not given pity or mercy. Stracci tries everything to get something to eat and he finally does. Unfortunately the ricotta cheese he avidly gorges on, combined with the awkward position he's forced to assume while being "crucified" in front of the camera prove a fatal combination and he dies from indigestion. Stracci represents the poor and the marginalized people, "the ones who hunger for bread" who, according to Pasolini, are neglected by a society, which prides itself on being Christian. Thus, in this view, the Roman Catholicism of Italy is more concerned with status and prominence than helping the poor, a teaching of Christ that Pasolini admired greatly.

== Interpretations ==
The production of the Passion, done outside of Rome, represents a corrupted society who is interested in superficial beauty and yet possesses a corrupted core. This is demonstrated with the extras' lack of interest with the film itself, preferring instead to dance to ya-ya twist music, lying around during break time and tormenting Stracci. This is also demonstrated in the elaborate poses the director has set up, evoking the great Italian Renaissance, particularly of Pontormo and Fiorentino, which the young actors have no interest in.

== Controversy ==
Pasolini, in a disclaimer tacked onto the beginning of "La ricotta," affirms that the event narrated, the Passion, is the greatest event that has ever occurred, and as in The Gospel According to St. Matthew, stressed that he held in great respect the Christian heritage. Despite this assertion, Pasolini was accused of holding contempt for the state religion and was sentenced four months of conviction, which he avoided by paying a fine. The sentence was later declared void by an appeals court.

== Resources ==
The film is more easily available as a supplement on the Mamma Roma DVD available through the Criterion Collection also included in Gaspar Noe' "Lux Aeterna" Bonus Materials.

- "Pasolini, Mamma Roma and 'La ricotta'" by Gary Indiana
- Pasolini by Enzo Siciliano
- Pasolini on Pasolini, interviews by Oswald Stacks
- Linguaggi e metalinguaggi ne La ricotta di Pier Paolo Pasolini. Il cibo, Erminia Passannanti, Brindin press, Salisbury, UK, (2005);
- Pasolini, La ricotta. Il sacro trasgredito, Erminia Passannanti, Brindin press, Salisbury, UK, (2007);
- La nudità del sacro nei film di Pier Paolo Pasolini Erminia Passannanti, Brindin press, Salisbury, UK, (2019);
