= Davide Tarizzo =

Davide Tarizzo (1966) is an Italian philosopher, notable for his academic research and works on political theory, psychoanalysis (Freud, Lacan), and Post-Kantian European philosophy. He currently serves as professor of political philosophy at the University of Salerno.

His contributions have been featured in several significant publications on contemporary Italian philosophy that have been released in the recent years, including but not limited to: Italian Thought Today (Routledge, 2014), Italian Biopolitical Theory and Beyond (Paragraph, 2016), and The Bloomsbury Italian Philosophy Reader (Bloomsbury, 2022).

Tarizzo delivered the 2024 Harry Camp Memorial Lecture.

== Main works ==
=== Life: A Modern Invention ===
The book, originally published in Italian, analyses the rise of "a new concept of life in modern era." In particular, "Tarizzo offers a philosophical supplement to what he deems Foucault's general tendency to default to the scientific field when tracking life's enunciation. His monograph thus collates around the discourse of life philosophy that remains at the margins of Foucault's archaeology." The idea behind the work is that the concept of life as we understand it today was initially coined by German Post-Kantian philosophers, who then exerted a heavy influence on the forerunners of the new science of biology. "Tarizzo is not calling for a philosophy of organism, or a phenomenology of embodiment. Rather, he wants to engage with a less specifically biological, more metaphysical, articulation of Life and Modernity." In other words, Tarizzo’s intent is to decode the semantics of modern 'life' and widen the frame, which Michel Foucault partially sketched, of the "savage ontology" of life that defines modernity as such. As has been observed, Tarizzo's "main focus of analysis is the essence of modernity, and he goes as far as to say that the modern period represents not only the political capture of life but also the moment of invention of life itself." Based on this, Tarizzo also advances the idea that the modern ontology of life represents an "implicit moral ontology", i.e. a set of assumptions that tacitly guide moral judgment, laying the grounds for the axiological system hidden behind the theory and practice of biopolitics.

=== Political Grammars: The Unconscious Foundations of Modern Democracy ===
This book discusses the issue of modern democracy starting from the question: 'what's a political subject?' According to Tarizzo, "shedding light on this concept means providing a definition for the two words of which it is comprised — political and subject: hence the need to outline a study at the crossroads between psychoanalysis (the 'subject') and political theory (the 'political')." Tarizzo argues, more precisely, that Jacques Lacan's theory of the subject enables us to understand the democratic process as a process of collective subjectification and self-assertion. Drawing on the Lacanian definition of speech beings (parlêtre), he contends that the capacity to speak in the first person plural, "we the people", is that which brings individuals together into a self-proclaimed democratic community. To explain how this capacity is acquired, Tarizzo introduces the notion of "political grammar"—a concept that refers both to the conditions of political subjectification, which initially frame the political discourse of the newborn democratic people, and the unconscious limitations that will affect the latter’s political behavior for the rest of its life. In the second part of the book, Tarizzo focuses on fascism viewed as a degeneration of modern democracy, expanding on various kinds of fascism–old and new, hard and soft–and explaining the basic characteristics that distinguish these phenomena in Europe and the United States (See also Trumpism, Pier Paolo Pasolini).

== Selected bibliography ==
=== Monographs ===
- Introduzione a Lacan. Bari: Laterza, 2003 [Introduction to Lacan].
- Il pensiero libero. La filosofia francese dopo lo strutturalismo. Milano: Raffaello Cortina Editore, 2003 [Free Thinking: French Philosophy after Structuralism].
- Homo Insipiens. La filosofia e la sfida dell'idiozia. Bari: Laterza, 2004 [Homo Insipiens: Philosophy and the Provocation of Idiocy]
- Giochi di potere. Sulla paranoia politica. Bari: Laterza, 2007 [Games of Power: On Political Paranoia].
- La vita, un'invenzione recente. Bari: Laterza, 2010. Translated in English by Mark William Epstein as Life: A Modern Invention. Minnesota University Press, 2017.
- Political Grammars. The Unconscious Foundations of Modern Democracy (Stanford University Press, 2021).
