= The Hawks and the Sparrows =

The Hawks and the Sparrows (Uccellacci e uccellini)
- Theatrical release poster
- Directed by: Pier Paolo Pasolini
- Written by: Pier Paolo Pasolini
- Produced by: Alfredo Bini
- Starring: Totò; Ninetto Davoli; Femi Benussi
- Cinematography: Mario Bernardo; Tonino Delli Colli
- Edited by: Nino Baragli
- Music by: Ennio Morricone
- Production company: Arco Film
- Distributed by: CIDIF
- Release date: 4 May 1966
- Running time: 88 minutes
- Country: Italy
- Language: Italian

The Hawks and the Sparrows (Italian: Uccellacci e uccellini) is a 1966 Italian film directed by Pier Paolo Pasolini. It was entered into the 1966 Cannes Film Festival, where a "Special Mention" was made of Totò, for his acting performance.

The film can be described as partially neorealist, and deals with Marxist concerns about poverty and class-conflict. It features the popular Italian comic-actor Totò, accompanied on a journey by his son (played by Ninetto Davoli). This is the last film to star Totò before his untimely death of a heart attack in 1967.

In 2008, the film was included on the Italian Ministry of Cultural Heritage's 100 Italian films to be saved, a list of 100 films that "have changed the collective memory of the country between 1942 and 1978".

== Plot ==
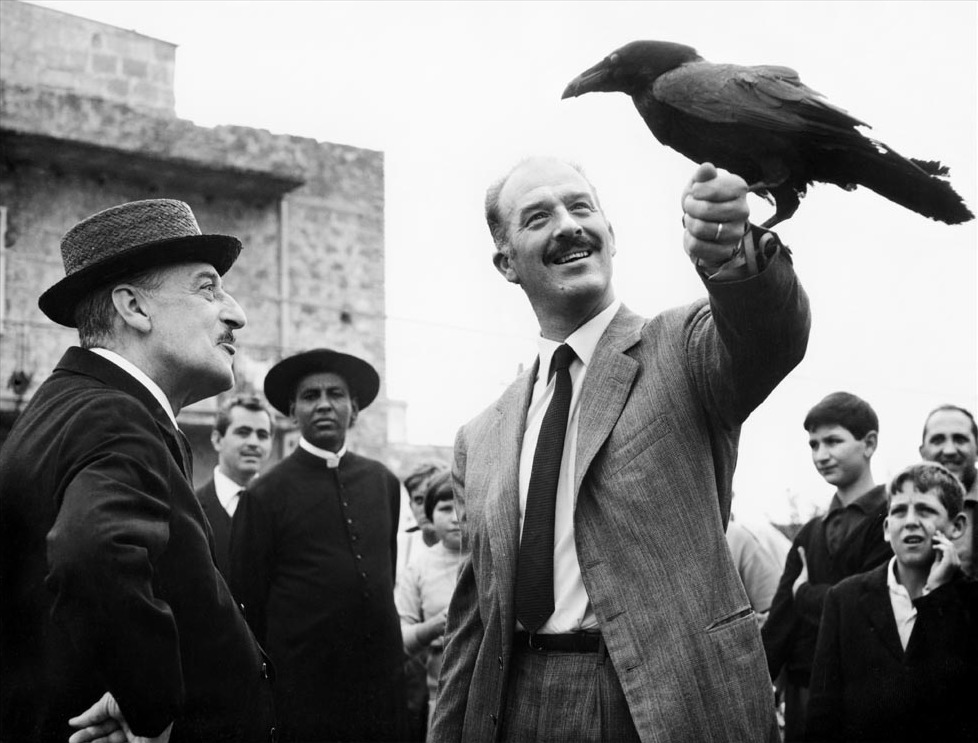
Totò and Alfredo Bini on the set of The Hawks and the Sparrows

Totò and his son Ninetto roam the neighbourhood and the countryside of Rome. During the walk they observe a body being removed from a house following a murder. They next encounter a talking crow, who is provides left-wing intellectual commentary during his journeys with Totò and Ninetto.

The Crow subsequently recounts the tale of Fra Ciccillo and Fra Ninetto, two Franciscan friars who are bid by St. Francis to preach the Gospel to the hawks (representing the powerful) and the sparrows (representing the weak). After many failures, they discover the language of birds and succeed in preaching the commandment of love unto the species separately, but are not able to get them to love each other. The hawks continue to kill and eat the sparrows, as it is in their nature. Saint Francis explains the relationship between the two groups to them from a Marxist perspective and invites them to continue proselytizing.

After the tale, the journey of Totò and Ninetto carries on, with the Crow still accompanying them. They encounter other individuals: land-owners who order them off their land when they are caught defecating; a desperately impoverished family whom Totò threatens to evict from their house if the rent is not paid; a group of traveling actors (representing figures marginalised from society such as women, gays, the elderly, racial minorities, and the disabled) who persuade the pair to push the group's Cadillac car for them; a rich man who is waiting for Totò to give him the money he owes him; mourners at the funeral of Palmiro Togliatti, the long-time leader of the Italian Communist Party; and a prostitute with whom Totò and Ninetto have sex. Finally, the two kill and eat the Crow, whom they found to be unconscionably boring.

== Cast ==
- Totò – Innocenti Totò / Brother Ciccillo
- Ninetto Davoli – Innocenti Ninetto / Brother Ninetto (as Davoli Ninetto)
- Femi Benussi – Luna, the prostitute
- Francesco Leonetti – The Crow (voice)
- Gabriele Baldini – The engineer
- Riccardo Redi – The dentist dantist
- Lena Lin Solaro – Urganda, the unknown
- Rossana di Rocco – Friend of Ninetto
- Umberto Bevilacqua – Incensurato
- Renato Capogna – The medieval rude fellow
- Vittorio Vittori – Ciro Lococo
- Renato Montalbano

== Production ==
Filming took place in Assisi, Tuscania, Viterbo, Rome and at Rome Fiumicino Airport. Interior sets from Incir De Paolis Studios were also used.

Pasolini chose to cast Totò as the protagonist as he felt his comedic style represented the two aspects of humanity: extravagance and humanity. Pasolini chose to use both non-professional actors from off the streets and Italian cinematic icons such as Totò, because he felt the brutality of the amateur and the lightness of the professional worked together.

Totò was used to choosing his own jokes and ad-libbing his own lines, but for this film he learned to respect Pasolini's script and direction.

Carlo Croccolo offered to dub Totò for Pasolini, as he worked on the dubbing for many of Totò's other films, but Pasolini refused this.

Scenes had to frequently be reshot as the crow kept trying to claw at Totò's eyes. Thus a system was devised where the crow's cage was placed behind the camera and the crow would chase after it.

Pasolini declared that Uccellacci e uccellini was his favourite film, as it was the only one that did not disappoint his expectations.

Ennio Morricone's opening theme music features Domenico Modugno singing the movie's credits.

== Reception ==
The film had great critical success, but the commercial success was very weak. This is the lowest grossing film to star Totò.

Due to the film's success among Italian critics, it has made it on to the list of 100 Italian films to be saved. On the review aggregator website Rotten Tomatoes, 85% of 13 critics' reviews are positive.
