= Yvan Sagnet =

- Born: 1985 (age 40–41); Douala, Cameroon
- Education: Engineering
- Alma mater: Polytechnic University of Turin
- Occupation: Activist
- Children: 1
- Writing career
- Language: Italian, French, English
- Years active: 2011–present
- Genre: Non-fiction

Yvan Sagnet (born Jean Pierre Yvan Sagnet; 1985) is a Cameroonian activist and non-fiction writer, known for founding the charity No Cap and his work against the exploitation of workers in the Italian agricultural industry.

== Biography ==
Sagnet was born in Douala, Cameroon.

Sagnet arrived in Italy in 2007 to attend the Polytechnic University of Turin to study engineering through receiving a scholarship. When he failed an exam and lost his scholarship at the end of July 2011, he traveled to Salento, Nardò in Southern Italy. He started working at Masseria Boncuri, a local farm, as a tomato picker. There, Sagnet organized a protest against the inhumane working conditions on the farm that successfully lead to reforms to the regulations for working conditions in the agricultural industry.

After the uprising, Sagnet continued his activism through working as an advocate for CGIL and finished his degree in engineering.

In 2015, Sagnet published a book about the exploitation of workers in the Italian agricultural industry with Fandango Libri. His second book, about his own experience at Masseria Boncuri, followed with Galleria Fandango in 2017.

In February 2017, Sagnet was knighted Cavaliere dell'Ordine al Merito della Repubblica Italiana by Italian president Sergio Mattarella for his work to end modern-day slavery in the Italian agricultural industry.

== Nardò uprising and aftermath ==
While working at the Massaria Boncuri, Sagnet discovered the caporalato, a system revolving around the caporali, who illegally recruit tomato workers in a gang-like manner that Sagnet describes as comparable to "modern-day slavery" in the Italian agricultural industry. The workers worked 16-hour days for wages of 20–25 euros, with the caporali taking a huge cut of the profits. Sagnet describes situations in which the caporali charged workers several days worth of wages for driving them to the hospital when they passed out due to exhaustion.

On the morning of 30 July 2011, after only working on the fields for five days, Sagnet persuaded his fellow workers to start a strike after their employers issued an increase in workload without an increase in pay. The workers protested for two weeks, erecting a street block. The protest encompassed 350 workers from Masseria Boncuri. When faced with the issue of not being paid and starvation during their strike, he reached out to the general public for help with food donations, and the strike eventually led to local farmers agreeing to formal contracts for their workers and politicians approving an anti-gang master law, forbidding the caporali from undercutting wages by law one week after the strike had ended, in September 2011.

In the same year, the Anti-Mafia District Attorney Office of Lecce started an investigation of the matter of the caporalato, requesting 22 arrests. 16 caporali were ultimately arrested. Sagnet was a key witness in the trial of kingpin Saber Ben Mahmoud Jelassi.

== No Cap ==
Sagnet is the founder of the No Cap Association, a reward system working with report cards, evaluating how ethically goods have been produced through the parameters ethics, energy, circularity, added value and short supply chain. The organization advocates for the ethical employment of tomato pickers through regulated contracts and without a caporalato, promoting the integration of ethically produced goods into the mainstream consumer market.

== Bibliography ==
- Ghetto Italia. I braccianti stranieri tra caporalato e sfruttamento (Fandango Libri, 2015)
- Ama il tuo sogno. Vita e rivolta nella terra dell'oro rosso (Galleria Fandango, 2017)
