= Pier Paolo Pasolini =

Italian writer, filmmaker, poet, and intellectual (1922–1975)

- Pasolini in 1964
- Born: 5 March 1922; Bologna, Emilia-Romagna, Kingdom of Italy
- Died: 2 November 1975 (aged 53); Ostia, Lazio, Italy
- Education: University of Bologna
- Occupations: Film director; novelist; poet; intellectual; journalist

Pier Paolo Pasolini (Italian: [ˌpjɛr ˈpaːolo pazoˈliːni]; 5 March 1922 – 2 November 1975) was an Italian poet, writer, filmmaker, actor and playwright. He is considered one of the defining public intellectuals in 20th-century Italian history, influential both as an artist and a political figure. He is known for directing The Gospel According to St. Matthew, Teorema, the films from Trilogy of Life (The Decameron, The Canterbury Tales and Arabian Nights) and Salò, or the 120 Days of Sodom.

A controversial personality due to his straightforward style, Pasolini's legacy remains contentious. Openly homosexual, while also a vocal advocate for heritage language revival, cultural conservatism, and Christian values in his youth, Pasolini became an avowed Marxist shortly after the end of World War II. He began voicing extremely harsh criticism of Italian petite bourgeoisie and what he saw as the Americanization, cultural degeneration, and greed-driven consumerism taking over Italian culture. As a filmmaker, Pasolini often juxtaposed socio-political polemics with an extremely graphic and critical examination of taboo sexual activity. A prominent protagonist of the Roman intellectual scene during the post-war era, Pasolini became an established and major figure in European literature and cinema.

Pasolini's unsolved and extremely brutal abduction, torture, and murder at Ostia in November 1975 prompted an outcry in Italy, where it continues to be a matter of heated debate. Recent leads by Italian cold case investigators suggest a contract killing by the Banda della Magliana, a criminal organisation with close links to the Propaganda Due masonic lodge and far-right terrorism, as the most likely cause.

== Biography ==
=== Early life ===
Pier Paolo Pasolini was born in Bologna, the elder son of Susanna Colussi, a Friulian elementary school teacher who would outlive both of her children, and Carlo Alberto Pasolini, a lieutenant in the Royal Italian Army who belonged to the cadet branch of an aristocratic family from Ravenna. They married in 1921. Pasolini was born in 1922 and named after a paternal uncle. The family moved to Conegliano in 1923, then to Belluno in 1925, where their second son, Guidalberto, was born. In 1926, Pasolini's father was arrested for gambling debts. His mother moved with the children to her family's home in Casarsa della Delizia, in the Friuli-Venezia Giulia region. Carlo Alberto reportedly became persuaded of the virtues of Italian fascism.

Pasolini began writing poems at age seven, inspired by the natural beauty of Casarsa. One of his early influences was the work of Arthur Rimbaud. His father was transferred to Idria in the Julian March (now in Slovenia) in 1931.

In 1933, they moved again to Cremona in Lombardy, and later to Scandiano and Reggio Emilia. Pasolini found it difficult to adapt to all these dislocations, although he enlarged his poetry and literature readings (Dostoyevsky, Tolstoy, Shakespeare, Coleridge, Novalis) and left behind the religious fervour of his early years. In the Reggio Emilia high school, he met his first true friend, Luciano Serra. The two met again in Bologna, where Pasolini spent seven years completing high school. Here he cultivated new passions, including football.

In 1939, Pasolini graduated and entered the Literature College of the University of Bologna, discovering new themes such as philology and aesthetics of figurative arts. He also frequented the local cinema club. Pasolini always showed his friends a virile and strong exterior, totally hiding his interior turmoil. In his poems of this period, Pasolini started to include fragments in Friulan, a minority language he did not speak but learned after he had begun to write poetry in it. "I learnt it as a sort of mystic act of love, a kind of félibrisme, like the Provençal poets."

In 1943, he would found the Academiuta della lenga furlana (Academy of the Friulan Language) with fellow students. As a young adult, Pasolini identified as an atheist.

In the waning years of World War II, Pasolini was drafted into the Italian Army. After his regiment was captured by the Germans following Italy's surrender, he escaped and fled to the small town of Casarsa where he remained for several years.

=== Early poetry ===
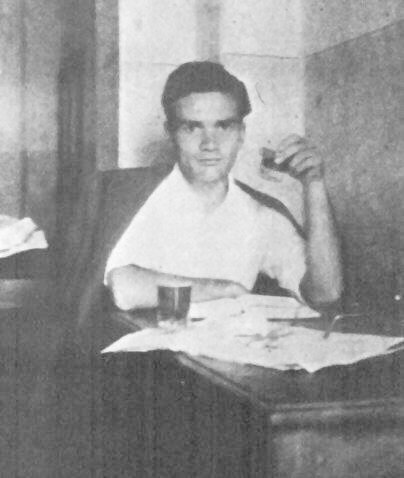
Pasolini in his young years

In 1942, Pasolini published at his own expense a collection of poems in Friulan, Poesie a Casarsa, which he had written at the age of eighteen. The work was noted and appreciated by such intellectuals and critics as Gianfranco Contini, Alfonso Gatto and Antonio Russi. Pasolini's pictures had also been well received. He was chief editor of a magazine called Il Setaccio ('The Sieve'), but was fired after conflicts with the director, who was aligned with the Fascist regime. A trip to Germany also helped him to perceive the "provincial" status of Italian culture in that period. These experiences led Pasolini to revise his opinion about the cultural politics of Fascism and to switch gradually to a communist position.

Pasolini's family took shelter in Casarsa, considered a more tranquil place to wait for the conclusion of the Second World War, a decision common among Italian military families. Here he joined a group of other young enthusiasts of the Friulan language who wanted to give Casarsa Friulan a status equal to that of Udine, the official regional standard. From May 1944, they issued a magazine entitled Stroligùt di cà da l'aga. In the meantime, Casarsa suffered Allied bombardments and forced enlistments by the Italian Social Republic, as well as partisan activity.

Pasolini tried to distance himself from these events. Starting in October 1943, Pasolini, his mother and other colleagues taught students unable to reach the schools in Pordenone or Udine. This educational workshop was considered illegal and was broken up in February 1944. His brother Guidalberto, aged 19, joined the Party of Action and their Brigate Osoppo, taking to the bush near Slovenia. On 12 February 1945, Guido was killed in an ambush planted by the Brigate Garibaldi serving in the lines of Josip Broz Tito's Yugoslavian guerrillas. This devastated Pasolini and his mother.

Six days after his brother's death, Pasolini and others founded the Friulan Language Academy (Academiuta di lenga furlana). Meanwhile, on account of Guido's death, Pasolini's father returned to Italy from his detention period in November 1945, settling in Casarsa. That same month, Pasolini graduated from university after completing a final thesis about the work of Giovanni Pascoli (1855–1912), an Italian poet and classical scholar.

In 1946, Pasolini published a small poetry collection, I Diarii ('The Diaries'), with the Academiuta. In October, he travelled to Rome. The following May he began the so-called Quaderni Rossi, handwritten in old school exercise books with red covers. He completed a drama in Italian, Il Cappellano. His poetry collection, I Pianti ('The cries'), was also published by the Academiuta.

=== Rome ===
In January 1950, Pasolini moved to Rome with his mother Susanna, to start a new life. He was acquitted of two indecency charges in 1950 and 1952. After one year sheltered in a maternal uncle's flat next to Piazza Mattei, Pasolini and his 59-year-old mother moved to a run-down suburb called Rebibbia, next to a prison, living there for three years. He transferred his Friulan countryside inspiration to this Roman suburb, one of the infamous borgate where poor proletarian immigrants lived, often in horrendous sanitary and social conditions. Instead of asking for help from other writers, Pasolini preferred to go his own way.

Pasolini found a job working in the Cinecittà film studios and sold his books in the bancarelle ('sidewalk shops') of Rome. In 1951, with the help of the Abruzzese-language poet Vittorio Clemente, he found a job as a secondary school teacher in Ciampino, just outside the capital. He had a long commute involving two train changes and earned a meagre salary of 27,000 lire.

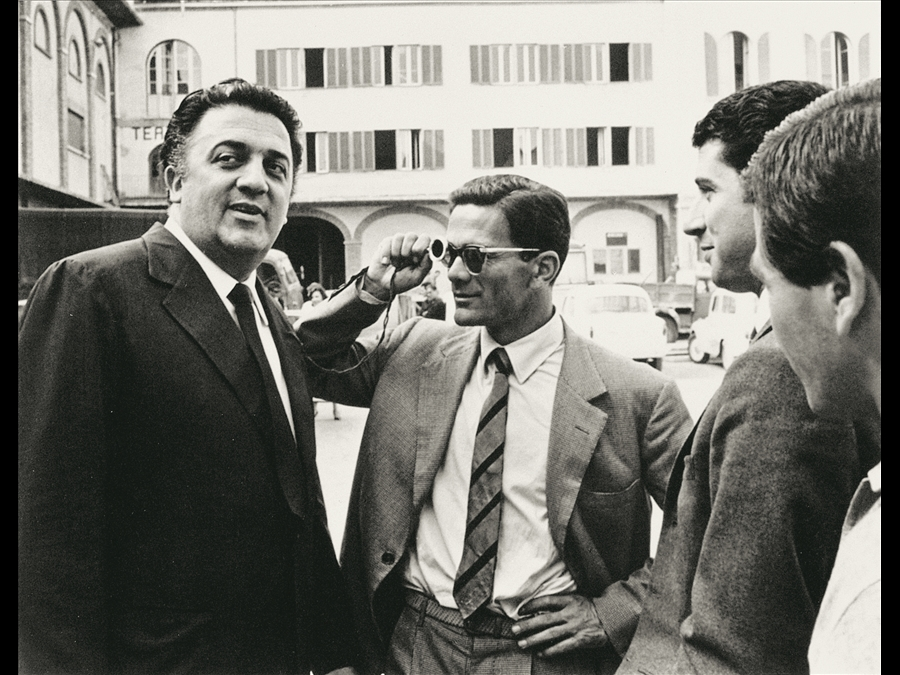
Pasolini with Federico Fellini in the late 1950s

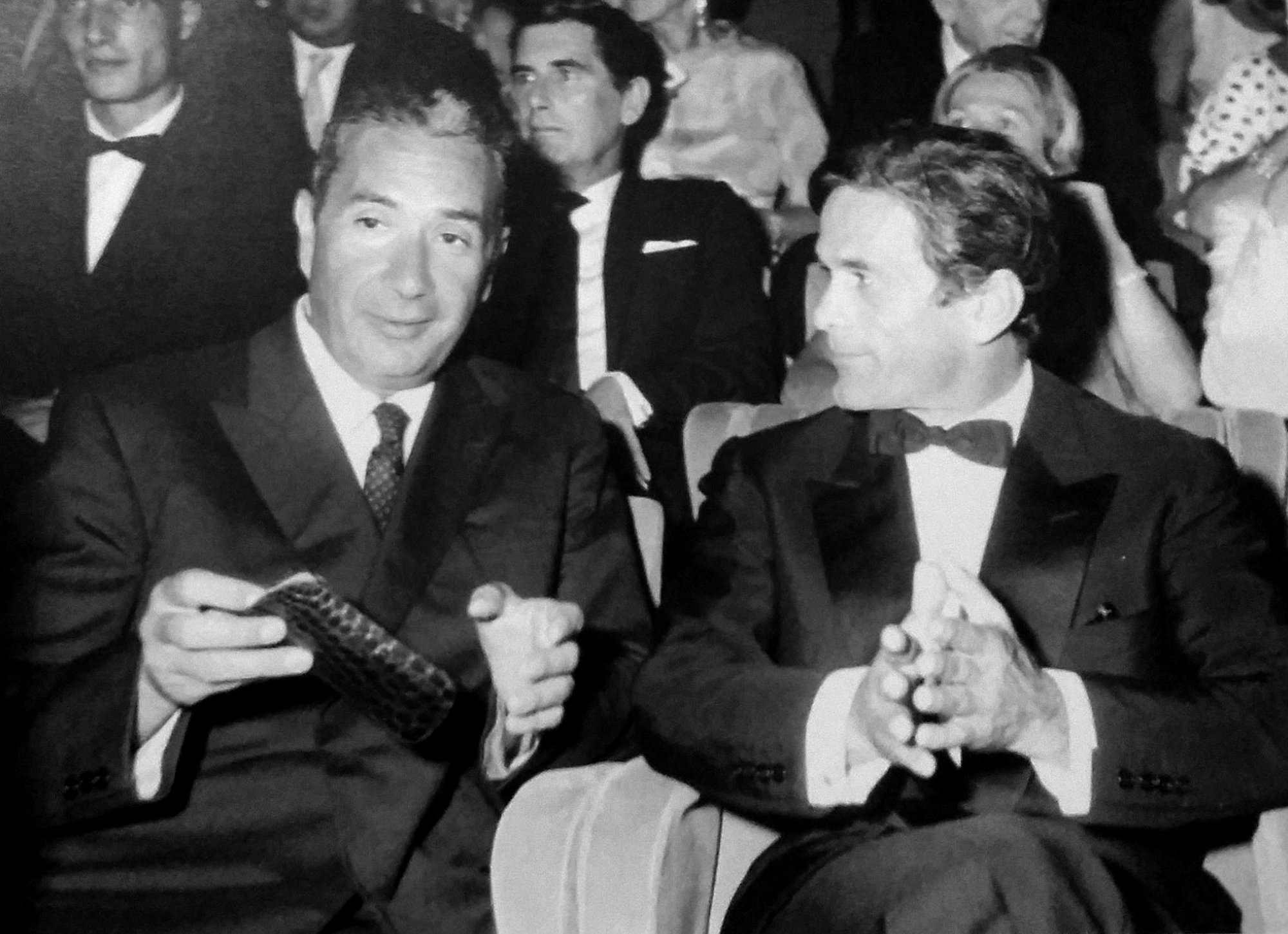
Pasolini with Prime Minister Aldo Moro at the Venice Film Festival in 1964

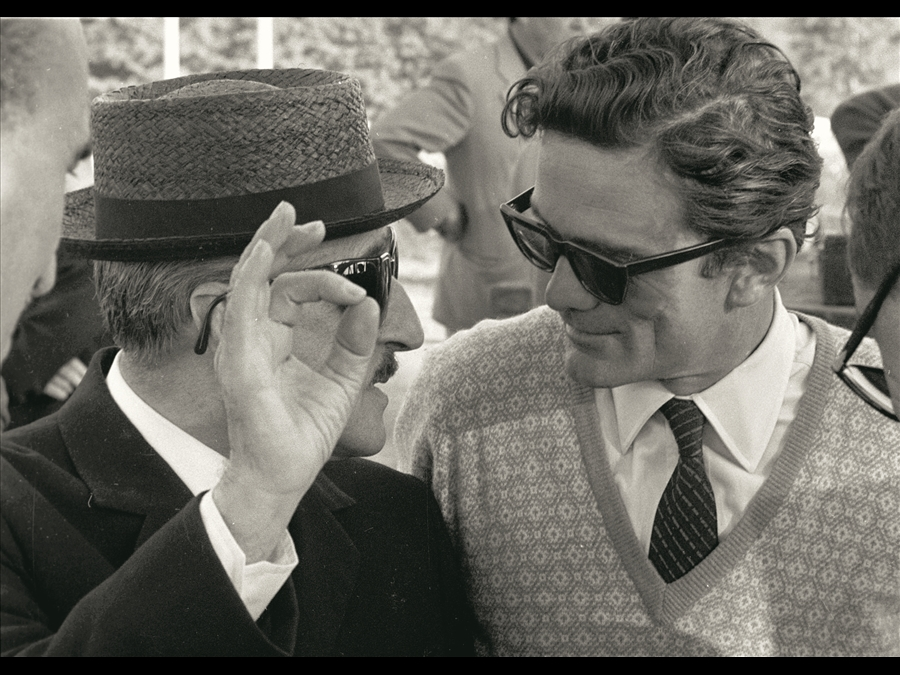
Pasolini with Totò in 1966

== Career ==
=== Writing ===
In 1954, Pasolini, who now worked for the literary section of Cinecittà, left his teaching job and moved to the Monteverde quarter. At this point, his cousin Graziella moved in. They also accommodated Pasolini's ailing, cirrhotic father Carlo Alberto, who died in 1958. Pasolini published La meglio gioventù, his first important collection of Friulan poems. His first novel, Ragazzi di vita (English: Hustlers), which dealt with the Roman lumpenproletariat, was published in 1955. The work had great success but was poorly received by the Italian Communist Party (PCI) establishment and, most importantly, by the Italian government. It initiated a lawsuit for "obscenity" against Pasolini and his publisher, Garzanti. Although exonerated, Pasolini became a target of insinuations, especially in the tabloid press.

In 1955, together with Francesco Leonetti, Roberto Roversi and others, Pasolini edited and published a poetry magazine called Officina. The magazine closed in 1959 after fourteen issues. That year he also published his second novel, Una vita violenta, which unlike his first was embraced by the Communist cultural sphere: he subsequently wrote a column titled Dialoghi con Passolini (meaning Passolini in Dialogue), for the PCI magazine Vie Nuove from May 1960 to September 1965, which were published in book form in 1977 as Le belle bandiere (The Beautiful Flags). In the late 1960s Pasolini edited an advice column in the weekly news magazine Tempo.

In 1966, Pasolini wrote a screenplay for a never-produced film about the apostle Saint Paul, which he subsequently revised. Pasolini's screenplay was intended to depict Paul as a modern contemporary without modifying any of Paul's statements. In Pasolini's story, Paul is a fascist Vichy France collaborator who becomes illuminated while traveling to Franco's Spain and joins the antifascist French resistance, an event which serves as the modern analogue for the Pauline conversion. The screenplay follows Paul as he preaches resistance in Italy, Spain, Germany, and New York (where he is betrayed, arrested, and executed). As philosopher Alain Badiou writes, "The most surprising thing in all this is the way in which Paul's texts are transplanted unaltered, and with an almost unfathomable naturalness, into the situations in which Pasolini deploys them: war, fascism, American capitalism, the petty debates of Italian intelligentsia[.]"

In 1970, Pasolini bought an old castle near Viterbo, several miles north of Rome, where he began to write his last novel, Il Petrolio, in which he denounced obscure dealing in the highest levels of government and the corporate world (Eni, CIA, the Mafia, etc). The novel-documentary was left incomplete at his death. In 1972, Pasolini started to collaborate with the far-left organization Lotta Continua, producing a documentary, 12 dicembre, concerning the Piazza Fontana bombing. The following year he began a collaboration for Italy's most renowned newspaper, Il Corriere della Sera. At the beginning of 1975, Garzanti published a collection of his critical essays, Scritti corsari.

=== Narrative ===
- Ragazzi di vita (The Ragazzi, 1955)
- Una vita violenta (A Violent Life, 1959)
- Il sogno di una cosa (1962)
- Amado Mio—Atti Impuri (1982, originally written in 1948)
- Alì dagli occhi azzurri (1965)
- Teorema (1968)
- Reality (The Poets' Encyclopedia, 1979)
- Petrolio (1992, incomplete)

=== Poetry ===
- La meglio gioventù (1954)
- Le ceneri di Gramsci (1957)
- L'usignolo della chiesa cattolica (1958)
- La religione del mio tempo (1961)
- Poesia in forma di rosa (1964)
- Trasumanar e organizzar (1971)
- La nuova gioventù (1975)
- Roman Poems. Pocket Poets No. 41 (1986)
- The Selected Poetry of Pier Paolo Pasolini: A Bilingual Edition (2014)

=== Essays ===
- Passione e ideologia (1960)
- Canzoniere italiano, poesia popolare italiana (1960)
- Empirismo eretico (1972)
- Lettere luterane (1976)
- Le belle bandiere (1977)
- Descrizioni di descrizioni (1979)
- Il caos (1979)
- La pornografia è noiosa (1979)
- Scritti corsari (1975)
- Lettere (1940–1954) (Letters, 1940–54, 1986)

=== Theatre ===
- Orgia (1968)
- Porcile (1968)
- Calderón (1973)
- Affabulazione (1977)
- Pilade (1977)
- Bestia da stile (1977)

=== Films ===
In 1957, together with Sergio Citti, Pasolini collaborated on Federico Fellini's film Nights of Cabiria, writing dialogue for the Roman dialect sections. Fellini also asked him to work on dialogue for some episodes of La dolce vita.

Pasolini made his debut as an actor in The Hunchback of Rome in 1960, and co-wrote Long Night in 1943. Along with Ragazzi di vita, he had his celebrated poem Le ceneri di Gramsci published, where Pasolini voiced tormented tensions between reason and heart, as well as the existing ideological dialectics within communism, a debate over artistic freedom, socialist realism and commitment.

Pasolini's first film as director and screenwriter was Accattone in 1961, again set among Rome's marginal communities, a story of pimps, prostitutes, and thieves that contrasted with Italy's postwar economic recovery. Although Pasolini tried to distance himself from neorealism, it is considered to be a type of second neorealism. Nick Barbaro, a critic writing in the Austin Chronicle, stated it "may be the grimmest movie" he has ever seen. The film aroused controversy and scandal, with conservatives demanded stricter censorship by the government. In 1963, the episode "La ricotta", included in the anthology film Ro.Go.Pa.G., was censored, and Pasolini was tried for "offence to the Italian state and religion".

During this period, Pasolini frequently travelled abroad: in 1961, with Elsa Morante and Alberto Moravia to India (where he went again seven years later); in 1962, to Sudan and Kenya; in 1963, to Ghana, Nigeria, Guinea, Jordan and Israel (where he shot the documentary Sopralluoghi in Palestina). In 1970 he travelled again to Africa to shoot another documentary, Appunti per un'Orestiade africana. Pasolini was a member of the jury at the 16th Berlin International Film Festival in 1966. In 1967, in Venice, he met and interviewed American poet Ezra Pound. They discussed the Italian movement neoavanguardia, and Pasolini read some verses from the Italian translation of Pound's Pisan Cantos.

The late 1960s and early 1970s was the era of the student movement. Pasolini, although acknowledging the students' ideological motivations, and referring to himself as a "Catholic Marxist", thought them "anthropologically middle-class" and therefore destined to fail in their attempts at revolutionary change. Regarding the Battle of Valle Giulia, which took place in Rome in March 1968, he said that he sympathized with the police, as they were "children of the poor", while the young militants were exponents of what he called "left-wing fascism".

He wrote and directed the black-and-white film The Gospel According to Matthew (1964). It is based on scripture, but adapted by Pasolini, and he is credited as a writer. Jesus, a barefoot peasant, is played by Enrique Irazoqui. In his 1966 film Uccellacci e uccellini (literally "Bad Birds and Little Birds" but translated in English as The Hawks and the Sparrows), a picaresque—and at the same time mystic—fable, Pasolini hired great Italian comedian Totò to work with Ninetto Davoli, the director's lover at the time and one of his preferred "naif" actors. It was a unique opportunity for Totò to demonstrate that he was a great dramatic actor as well. In Teorema (Theorem, 1968), starring Terence Stamp as a mysterious stranger, Pasolini depicted the sexual coming-apart of a bourgeois family.

Later films are comedies centred on sex-laden folklore, such as Giovanni Boccaccio's Decameron (1971), Geoffrey Chaucer's The Canterbury Tales (1972), and Il fiore delle mille e una notte (literally The Flower of 1001 Nights, released in English as Arabian Nights, 1974). These medieval sex comedies are usually grouped as the Trilogy of Life. In Salò, humans are not only seen as commodities under authoritarian or totalitarian control but are viewed merely as cyphers for its whims.

His final work, Salò o le 120 giornate di Sodoma (Salò, or the 120 Days of Sodom, 1975), exceeded what most viewers could accept at the time in its explicit scenes of sexual perversity and intensely sadistic violence. Based on the novel 120 Days of Sodom by Marquis de Sade, it is considered Pasolini's most controversial film. In May 2006, Time Out's Film Guide named it the "Most Controversial Film" of all time. Salò was intended as the first film of his Trilogy of Death, followed by an aborted biopic film about Gilles de Rais.

- Note: All titles listed below were written and directed by Pasolini unless stated otherwise.

Year	Title		Adapted from	Notes
Year	Original	In English	Adapted from	Notes
1961	Accattone	Accattone	Pasolini's novel Una vita violenta.	Screenplay written in collaboration with Sergio Citti.
1962	Mamma Roma	Mamma Roma		Screenplay by Pasolini with additional dialogue by Citti.
1964	Il vangelo secondo Matteo	The Gospel According to St. Matthew	The Gospel of Matthew.	Won the Silver Lion at the 25th Venice International Film Festival, United Nations Award at the 21st British Academy Film Awards.
1966	Uccellacci e uccellini	The Hawks and the Sparrows		
1967	Edipo re	Oedipus Rex	Oedipus Rex by Sophocles.	Acted in the film as High Priest
1968	Teorema	Theorem (Note: The translated English title is used infrequently.)		Pasolini's novel Teorema was also published in 1968.
1969	Porcile	Pigsty		
1969	Medea	Medea	Medea by Euripides.	
1971	Il Decameron	The Decameron	The Decameron by Giovanni Boccaccio.	Won the Silver Bear at the 21st Berlin International Film Festival. Acted in the film as Allievo di Giotto.
1972	I racconti di Canterbury	The Canterbury Tales	The Canterbury Tales by Geoffrey Chaucer.	Won the Golden Bear at the 22nd Berlin International Film Festival. Acted in the film as Geoffrey Chaucer.
1974	Il fiore delle Mille e una Notte	A Thousand and One Nights (Arabian Nights)	One Thousand and One Nights	Screenplay written in collaboration with Dacia Maraini. Won the Grand Prix Spécial Prize at the 1974 Cannes Film Festival.
1975	Salò o le 120 giornate di Sodoma	Salo, or the 120 Days of Sodom	Les 120 journées de Sodome ou l'école du libertinage by the Marquis de Sade.	Screenplay written in collaboration with Citti with extended quotes from Roland Barthes' Sade, Fourier, Loyola and Pierre Klossowski's Sade mon prochain.

=== Episodes in omnibus films ===
- La ricotta in RoGoPaG (1963)
- First segment of La rabbia (1963)
- "La Terra vista dalla Luna" in The Witches (1967)
- "Che cosa sono le nuvole?" in Caprice Italian Style (1968)
- "La sequenza del fiore di carta" in Love and Anger (1969)

=== Documentaries ===
- Love Meetings (1964)
- Sopralluoghi in Palestina per Il Vangelo secondo Matteo (1965)
- Appunti per un film sull'India (1968)
- Appunti per un romanzo dell'immondizia (1970)
- Appunti per un'Orestiade Africana (1970)
- Le mura di Sana'a (1971)
- 12 Dicembre (1972)
- Pasolini e la forma della città (1974)

== Personal life ==
A small scandal broke out during a local festival in Ramuscello in September 1949. Someone informed Cordovado, the local sergeant of the Carabinieri, of sexual conduct (masturbation) by Pasolini with three teenagers aged between sixteen and fifteen after dancing and drinking. Cordovado summoned the boys' parents, who refused to file charges despite Cordovado's urging. Cordovado nevertheless drew up a report, and the informer elaborated publicly on his accusations, sparking a public uproar. A judge in San Vito al Tagliamento charged Pasolini with "corruption of minors and obscene acts in public places".

Pier Paolo Pasolini and the two 16-year-old teenagers were both indicted. and the trial was scrapped due to lack of evidence. The two sixteen-year-old boys and Pasolini were forced to pay the court costs but were acquitted of the charges, with the insubstantial accusation of corruption of a minor and the charge of indecent exposure in a public place being dropped because the area was private property, isolated, and hidden from view by hedges.

The next month, when questioned, Pasolini did not deny the facts, but talked of a "literary and erotic drive" and cited André Gide, the 1947 Nobel Prize for Literature laureate. Cordovado informed his superiors and the regional press stepped in. According to Pasolini, the Christian Democrats instigated the entire affair to smear his name ("the Christian Democrats pulled the strings"). He was fired from his job in Valvasone and was expelled from the PCI by the party's Udine section, which he considered a betrayal. He addressed a critical letter to the head of the section, his friend Ferdinando Mautino, and claimed he was being subject to a "tacticism" of the PCI. In the party, the expulsion was opposed by Teresa Degan, Pasolini's colleague in education. He also wrote her a letter admitting his regret for being "such a naif, even indecently so". Pasolini's parents reacted angrily and the situation in the family also became untenable. In late 1949, he decided to move to Rome along with his mother, seeking to start a new life, settling down in the outskirts of Rome.

In 1963, at the age of 41, Pasolini met "the great love of his life", 15-year-old Ninetto Davoli, whom he later cast in his 1966 film Uccellacci e uccellini (literally "Bad Birds and Little Birds" but translated in English as The Hawks and the Sparrows). Pasolini became the youth's mentor and friend.

Important women in Pasolini's life with whom he shared a feeling of profound and unique friendship were, in particular, actress Laura Betti and singer Maria Callas. Dacia Maraini, an Italian writer, said of Callas' behaviour towards Pasolini: "She used to follow him everywhere, even to Africa. She hoped to 'convert' him to heterosexuality and to marriage." Pasolini was also sensible to the problematics related to the "new" role ascribed to women through the Italian media, stating in a 1972 interview that "women are not slot machines".

He was a supporter of his hometown football club Bologna.

== Political views ==
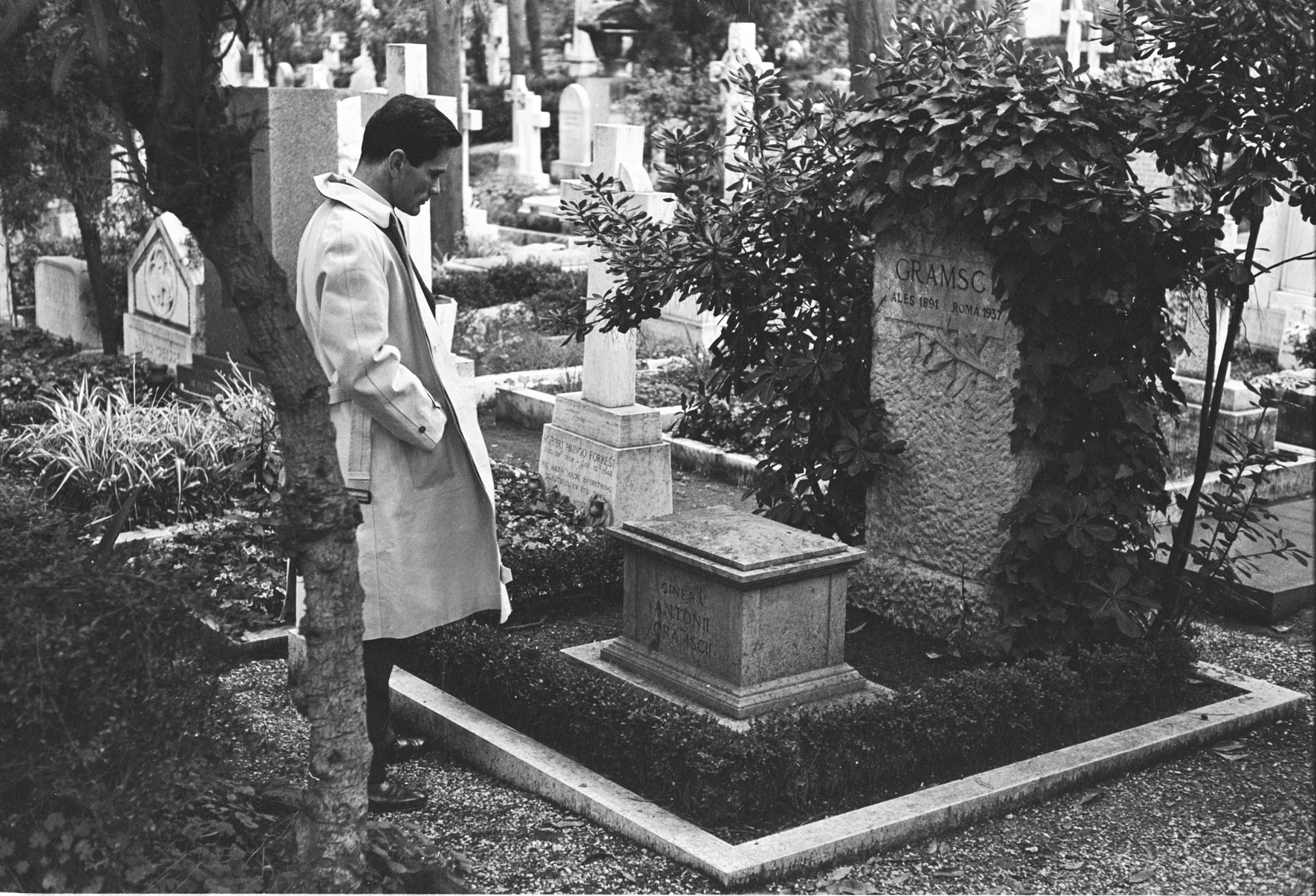
Pasolini visiting Antonio Gramsci's tomb in Rome

=== Relationship with the Italian Communist Party ===
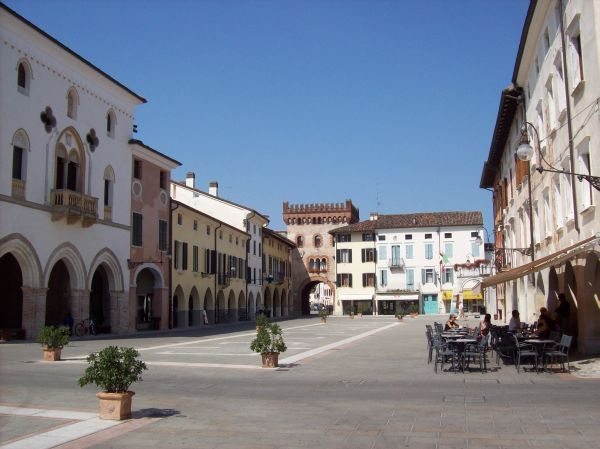
Piazza del Popolo in San Vito al Tagliamento

By October 1945, the political status of the Friuli region became a matter of contention between different political factions. On 30 October, Pasolini joined the pro-devolution association Patrie tal Friul, founded in Udine. Pasolini wanted a Friuli based on its tradition, attached to the Catholic Church in Italy, but intent on civic and social progress, as opposed to those advocates of regional autonomy who wanted to preserve their privileges based on "immobilism". He also criticized the Italian Communist Party (PCI) for its opposition to regional devolution and preference instead for State centralisation. Pasolini founded the party Movimento Popolare Friulano, but resigned upon realizing that it was being covertly manipulated by Italy's ruling Christian Democratic Party to counter local Titoists, who were attempting to annex large swaths of the Friuli region to the Socialist Federal Republic of Yugoslavia.

On 26 January 1947, Pasolini wrote a declaration that was published on the front page of the newspaper Libertà: "In our opinion, we think that currently only Communism is able to provide a new culture." It generated controversy, partly due to the fact he was still not a member of the PCI. Pasolini planned to extend the work of the Academiuta to the literature of other Romance languages, and met exiled Catalan poet Carles Cardó. He took part in several demonstrations after joining the PCI. In May 1949, he attended the Peace Congress in Paris. Observing the struggles of workers and peasants, and watching the clashes of protesters with Italian police, he began to conceive his first novel. During this period, while holding a position as a teacher in a secondary school, he stood out in the local Italian Communist Party section as a skillful writer, while defying the official Party platform that Stalinism was anti-Christian. Along with the Party leadership, local Christian Democrats and Catholic clergy also took notice. In the summer of 1949, Pasolini was warned by a Roman Catholic priest to renounce Marxism-Leninism or lose his teaching position. Similarly, after some posters were put up in Udine, Giambattista Caron, a Christian Democrat deputy, warned Pasolini's cousin Nico Naldini that "[Pasolini] should abandon communist propaganda" to prevent "pernicious reactions".

=== Anti-fascism and 1968 protests ===
Pasolini generated heated public discussion with controversial analyses of public affairs. For instance, autonomist university students were carrying on a guerrilla-style uprising against the police in the streets of Rome during the disorders of 1968. For their supporters, the disorders were a civil fight of the proletariat against the system. Pasolini made comments that have been interpreted that he was with the police or that he was a man of order, and that he was an anti-anti-fascist. According to the Centro Studi, Pier Paolo Pasolini, the myth of an "anti-anti-fascist" Pasolini served to propose unlikely anti-globalist alliances by neo-fascists. Anti-antifascismo was never used by Pasolini and was only added in later years as the title of the Scritti corsari collection. Pasolini used the concept to attack various institutional subjects, such as Christian Democracy, the Italian president Giuseppe Saragat, RAI, and the Health Commission of the Chamber of Deputies, which were all guilty of ignoring some requests from Marco Pannella, who had been on hunger strike for over two months. He excluded the PCI from those parties of the constitutional arc that, as declared by Pasolini in June 1975, tried to "rebuild an anti-fascist virginity ... but, at the same time, maintaining the impunity of the fascist gangs that they, if they wanted, would liquidate in a day".

The main source regarding Pasolini's views of the student movement is his poem "Il PCI ai giovani" ('The PCI to Young People'), written after the Battle of Valle Giulia. Addressing the students, he tells them that, unlike the international news media which has been reporting on them, he will not flatter them. He points out that they are the children of the bourgeoisie (Avete facce di figli di papà / Vi odio come odio i vostri papà – 'You have the faces of daddy's boys / I hate you like I hate your dads'), before stating Quando ieri a Valle Giulia avete fatto a botte coi poliziotti / io simpatizzavo coi poliziotti ('When you and the policemen were throwing punches yesterday at Valle Giulia / I was sympathising with the policemen'). He explained that this sympathy was because the policemen were figli di poveri ('children of the poor'). The poem highlights the aspect of generational struggle within the bourgeoisie represented by the student movement: Stampa e Corriere della Sera, News- week e Monde / vi leccano il culo. Siete i loro figli / la loro speranza, il loro futuro... Se mai / si tratta di una lotta intestina ('Stampa and Corriere della Sera, Newsweek and Le Monde / they kiss your arse. You are their children / their hope, their future... If anything / it's in-fighting').

The 1968 revolt was seen by Pasolini as an internal, benign reform of the establishment in Italy, since the protesters were part of the petite bourgeoisie. The poem also implied a class hypocrisy on the part of the establishment towards the protesters, asking whether young workers would be treated similarly if they behaved in the same way: Occupate le università / ma dite che la stessa idea venga / a dei giovani operai / E allora: Corriere della Sera e Stampa, Newsweek e Monde / avranno tanta sollecitudine / nel cercar di comprendere i loro problemi? / La polizia si limiterà a prendere un po' di botte / dentro una fabbrica occupata? / Ma, soprattutto, come potrebbe concedersi / un giovane operaio di occupare una fabbrica / senza morire di fame dopo tre giorni? ('Occupy the universities / but say that the same idea comes / to young workers / So: Corriere della Sera and Stampa, Newsweek and Le Monde / will have so much care / in trying to understand their problems? / Will the police just get a bit of a fight / inside an occupied factory? / But above all, how could / a young worker be allowed to occupy a factory / without dying of hunger after three days?')

Pasolini suggested that the police were the true proletariat, sent to fight for a poor salary and for reasons which they could not understand, against pampered boys of their same age because they had not had the fortune of being able to study, referring to poliziotti figli di proletari meridionali picchiati da figli di papà in vena di bravate ('policemen, sons of proletarian southerners, beaten up by arrogant daddy's boys'). He found that the policemen were but the outer layer of the real power, e.g. the judiciary. Pasolini was not alien to courts and trials. During all his life, Pasolini was frequently entangled in up to 33 lawsuits filed against him, variously charged with "public disgrace", "foul language", "obscenity", "pornography", "contempt of religion", and "contempt of the state", for which he was always eventually acquitted.

The conventional interpretation of Pasolini's position has been challenged. In an article published in 2015, Wu Ming argued that Pasolini's statements need to be understood in the context of Pasolini's self-confessed hatred of the bourgeoisie which had persecuted him for so long, as "Il PCI ai giovani" states that "We (i.e. Pasolini and the students) are obviously in agreement against the police institution", and that the poem portrays policemen as dehumanised by their work. Although the battles between students and the police were fights between the rich and the poor, Pasolini concedes that the students were "on the side of reason" whilst the police were "in the wrong". Wu Ming suggested that Pasolini intended to express scepticism regarding the idea of students being a revolutionary force, contending that only the working class could make a revolution and that revolutionary students should join the PCI. Furthermore, he cites a column by Pasolini which was published in the magazine Tempo later that year, which described the student movement, along with the wartime resistance, as "the Italian people's only two democratic-revolutionary experiences". That year, he also wrote in support of the PCI's proposals for disarming the police, arguing that this would create a break in the psychology of policemen. He said: "It would lead to the sudden collapse of that 'false idea of himself' ascribed to him by Power, which has programmed him like a robot." Pasolini's polemics were aimed at goading protesters into re-thinking their revolt, and did not stop him from contributing to the autonomist Lotta Continua movement, who he described as "extremists, yes, maybe fanatic and insolently boorish from a cultural point of view, but they push their luck and that is precisely why I think they deserve to be supported. We must want too much to obtain a little."

=== Rising society of consumption ===
Pasolini was particularly concerned about the class of the subproletariat, which he portrayed in Accattone, and to which he felt both humanly and artistically drawn. He observed that the type of purity which he perceived in the pre-industrial popular culture was rapidly vanishing, a process that he named la scomparsa delle lucciole ('the disappearance of the fireflies'). The joie de vivre of boys was being rapidly replaced with more bourgeois ambitions such as a house and a family. He was critical of those leftists who held a "traditional and never admitted hatred against lumpenproletariats and poor populations". In 1958, he called on the PCI to become "'the party of the poor people': the party, we may say, of the lumpenproletarians".

Pasolini's stance finds its roots in the belief that a Copernican change was taking place in Italian society and the world. Linked to that very idea, he was also an ardent critic of consumismo, i.e. consumerism, which he felt had rapidly destroyed Italian society from the mid-1960s to the early 1970s. He described the coprophagia scenes in Salò as a comment on the processed food industry. As he saw it, the society of consumerism ("neocapitalism") and the "new fascism" had thus expanded an alienation / homogenization and centralization that the former clerical fascism had not managed to achieve, so bringing about an anthropological change. That change is related to the loss of humanism and the expansion of productivity as central to the human condition, which he despised. He found that 'new culture' was degrading and vulgar. In one interview, he said: "I hate with particular vehemency the current power, the power of 1975, which is a power that manipulates bodies in a horrible way; a manipulation that has nothing to envy to that performed by Himmler or Hitler." According to Pasolini scholar Simona Bondavalli, Pasolini's definition of neo-capitalism as a "new fascism" enforced uniform conformity without resorting to coercive means. As Pasolini put it, "No Fascist centralism succeeded in doing what the centralism of consumer culture did." Philosopher Davide Tarizzo summarized Pasolini's position:

"In his view, both old and new fascisms undermine the fundamentals of modern democracy. Yet new fascism does not do this by absolutizing popular sovereignty at the expense of individual rights. New fascism celebrates our freedoms and absolutizes human rights to the detriment of our sense of belonging to a social-political community. Therefore, old and new fascisms strive to accomplish democracy—which is the restless ambition of fascism—via opposite routes. In the former case, the result is the birth of political subjects such as the master race, supported by revelatory political grammar. In the latter case, the result is the birth of an altogether different subject, which is no longer a political actor, properly speaking, but a passive, anonymous entity: the human population."

=== Strong criticism of Christian Democracy ===
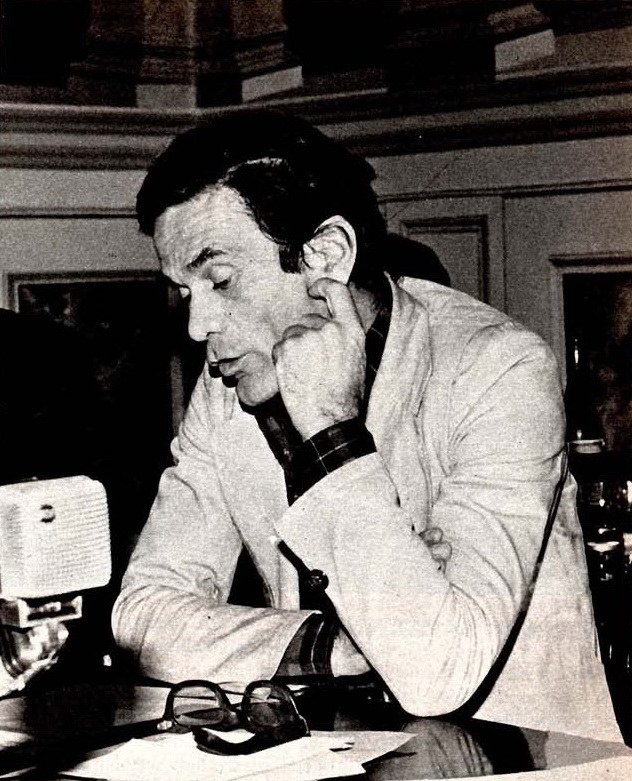
Pasolini in 1975

Pasolini saw some continuity between the Fascist era and the post-war political system which was led by the Christian Democrats, describing the latter as "clerico-fascism" due to its use of the state as a repressive instrument and its manipulation of power: he saw the conditions among the Roman subproletariat in the borgate as an example of this, being marginalised and segregated socially and geographically as they were under Fascism, and in conflict with a criminal police force. He also blamed the Christian Democrats for assimilating the values of consumer capitalism, contributing to what he saw as the erosion of human values.

The 1975 Italian regional elections saw the rise of the leftist parties, and dwelling on his blunt, ever more political approach and prophetic style during this period, he declared in Corriere della Sera that the time had come to put the most prominent Christian Democrat figures on trial, where they would need to be shown walking in handcuffs and led by the Carabinieri; he felt that this was the only way they could be removed from power. Pasolini charged the Christian Democratic leadership with being "riddled with Mafia influence", covering up a number of bombings by neo-fascists, collaborating with the CIA, and working with the CIA and the Italian Armed Forces to prevent the rise of the left.

=== Television linked to cultural alienation ===
Pasolini was angered by economic globalization and cultural domination of the north of Italy (around Milan) over other regions, especially the south. He felt this was accomplished through the power of television. A debate TV programme recorded in 1971, where he denounced censorship, was not actually aired until the day following his murder in November 1975. In a PCI reform plan that he drew up in September and October 1975, among the desirable measures to be implemented, he cited the abolition of television.

=== Others ===
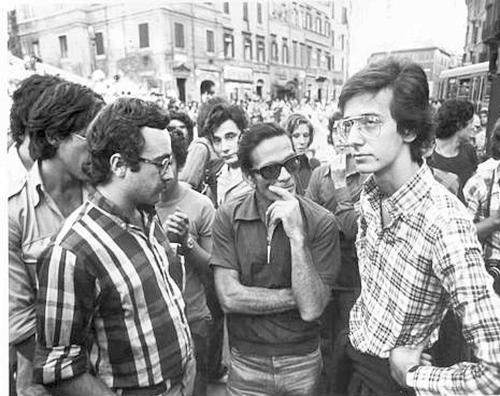
Pasolini between Ferdinando Adornato and Walter Veltroni during an anti-francoist demonstration in Rome in September 1975

Pasolini opposed the gradual disappearance of Italy's minority languages by writing some of his poetry in Friulan, the regional language of his childhood. His opposition to the liberalization of abortion law made him unpopular on the left.

After 1968, Pasolini engaged with the left-libertarian, anti-clerical, and liberal Radical Party (Partito Radicale). He involved himself in polemics with party leader Marco Pannella, supported the Party's initiative calling for eight referendums on various liberalising reforms, and had accepted an invitation to speak at the Party's congress before he was killed. Despite supporting the holding of a referendum on the decriminalisation of abortion, he was opposed to actually decriminalising it, and he also criticised the Party's understanding of democratic activism as being a matter of equalising access to capitalist markets for the working class and other subaltern groups. In an interview he gave shortly before his death, Pasolini stated he frequently disagreed with the Party. He continued to give qualified support to the PCI. in June 1975, he said that he would still vote for the PCI because he felt it was "an island where critical consciousness is always desperately defended: and where human behaviour has been still able to preserve the old dignity", and in his final months he became close to the Rome section of the Italian Communist Youth Federation. A Federation activist, Vincenzo Cerami, delivered the speech he was due to give at the Radical Party congress: in it, Pasolini confirmed his Marxism and his support for the PCI.

Outside of Italy, Pasolini took a particular interest in the developing world, seeing parallels between life among the Italian underclass and in the third world, going so far as to declare that Bandung was the capital of three-quarters of the world and half of Italy. He was also positive about the New Left in the United States, predicting that it would "lead to an original form of non-Marxist Socialism" and writing that the movement reminded him of the Italian Resistance. Pasolini saw these two areas of struggle as inter-linked: after visiting Harlem he stated that "the core of the struggle for the Third World revolution is really America".

== Murder ==
Pasolini was murdered on 2 November 1975 at a beach in Ostia. Almost unrecognizable, Pasolini was savagely beaten, and run over several times with his own car. Multiple bones were broken and his testicles were crushed by what appeared to have been a metal bar. An autopsy revealed that his body had been partially burned with petrol after his death. The crime was long viewed as a Mafia-style revenge killing, one that was extremely unlikely to have been carried out by only one person. Pasolini was buried at the cemetery of Casarsa della Delizia.

Giuseppe "Pino" Pelosi (1958–2017), then 17 years old, was caught driving Pasolini's car and confessed to the murder. He was convicted and sentenced to nine years in prison in 1976, initially with "unknown others", but that phrase was later removed from the verdict. Twenty-nine years later, on 7 May 2005, Pelosi retracted his confession, which he said had been made under the threat of violence to his family. He claimed that three people "with a southern accent" had committed the murder, while insulting Pasolini as a "dirty communist."

Other evidence uncovered in 2005 suggested that Pasolini had been murdered by an extortionist. Testimony by his friend Sergio Citti indicated that some of the rolls of film from Salò, or the 120 Days of Sodom had been stolen, and that Pasolini planned to meet with and negotiate its return from the thieves on 2 November 1975 following a visit to Stockholm, Sweden. Citti's investigation uncovered additional evidence, including a bloody wooden stick and an eyewitness who said he saw a group of men pull Pasolini from the car. The Rome police reopened the murder as a cold case after Pelosi's retraction, but the investigative magistrates responsible for the investigation found that the new elements were insufficient to justify a continued inquiry.

Speculation that Pasolini's murder was connected to the Propaganda Due (P2) masonic lodge emerged in the 1990s, after his writings were revealed to have linked the P2 member Eugenio Cefis with violent crimes. As of 2023, a plea to reopen the case was filed based on DNA analysis and links the murder to the Banda della Magliana, a criminal organisation with close ties to P2 and far-right terrorism, as the probable culprits.

== Legacy ==
As a director, Pasolini created a picaresque neorealism, often portraying sad realities of life. Many people did not want to see such portrayals in artistic work for public distribution. Mamma Roma (1962), featuring Anna Magnani and telling the story of a prostitute and her son, was considered an affront to the public ideals and morality of those times. His works often strove to show that cruel realities were less distant from the daily lives of most, and contributed to changes in the Italian psyche.

Pasolini's work often engendered disapproval, perhaps primarily because of his frequent focus on sexual behaviour, and the contrast between what he presented and what was publicly sanctioned. While Pasolini's poetry often dealt with his gay love interests, this was not the only, or even main, theme. His interest in and use of Italian dialects should also be noted. Much of the poetry was about his highly revered mother. He depicted certain corners of the contemporary reality as few other poets could do. His poetry, which took some time before it was translated, was not as well known outside Italy as were his films. A collection in English was published in 1996.

Pasolini also developed a philosophy of language mainly related to his studies on cinema. This theoretical and critical activity was another hotly debated topic. His collected articles and responses are still available today.

These studies can be considered the foundation of his artistic point of view: he believed that the language—such as English, Italian, dialect or other—is a rigid system in which human thought is trapped. He also thought that the cinema is the "written" language of reality which, like any other written language, enables man to see things from the point of view of truth.

His films won awards at the Berlin International Film Festival, Cannes Film Festival, Venice Film Festival, Italian National Syndicate for Film Journalists, Jussi Awards, Kinema Junpo Awards, International Catholic Film Office and New York Film Critics Circle. The Gospel According to St. Matthew was nominated for the United Nations Award of the British Academy of Film and Television Arts (BAFTA) in 1968.

=== In popular culture ===
Many documentaries and films about Pasolini have been released since the time of his murder, some of which include:

- Das Mitleid ist gestorben, a documentary directed by Ebbo Demant and released in 1978.
- In 1986, the avant-garde band Coil released their album Horse Rotorvator, which includes the track "Ostia (The Death of Pasolini)" in tribute to the late filmmaker.
- The opening track on Scott Walker's 1995 album Tilt, "Farmer in the City", is subtitled "Remembering Pasolini". Some of the lyrics are appropriated from Norman MacAfee's English translation of Pasolini's poem, "Uno dei tanti epiloghi" ("One of the Many Epilogs"), which was written in 1969.
- Who Killed Pasolini?, directed by Marco Tullio Giordana in 1995. The film reconstructs the trial of Pino Pelosi, accused of Pasolini's murder.
- Re: Pasolini, made by Stefano Battaglia in 2005, was dedicated to Pasolini.
- Pasolini, directed by Abel Ferrara. A 2014 biopic directed about Pasolini, with Willem Dafoe in the lead role. It was selected to compete for the Golden Lion at the 71st Venice International Film Festival.
- PPPasolini, directed by Malga Kubiak, a drama movie based on the story of Pier Paolo Pasolini's life and death, released in 2015. The movie was screened at the seventh edition of the LGBT Film Festival in Warsaw, and received a People's Choice Award at the festival.
- La macchinazione, directed by his former collaborator David Grieco, a 2016 biopic on the last hours of Pasolini's life starring Massimo Ranieri as Pasolini.

Since 2021, Tilda Swinton and Olivier Saillard have periodically organised a performance called Embodying Pasolini where Swinton dons or otherwise interacts with original pieces of costume from Pasolini's films.

The Silver Book by Olivia Laing is a novel about the making of Salò, or the 120 Days of Sodom and the murder of Pasolini in 1975.

== Filmography ==
Year	Title	Writer	Director	Soundtrack	Role	Notes
1955	The River Girl	Yes	No	No	—	
1957	Nights of Cabiria	Yes	No	No	—	
1958	Young Husbands	Yes	No	No	—	
1959	Bad Girls Don't Cry	Yes	No	No	—	
1960	Long Night in 1943	Yes	No	No	—	
1960	The Hunchback of Rome	No	No	No	Monco	
1960	La Dolce Vita	Yes	No	No	—	
1960	Il bell'Antonio	Yes	No	No	—	
1960	From a Roman Balcony	Yes	No	No	—	
1961	Accattone	Yes	Yes	No	—	
1961	Girl in the Window	Yes	No	No	—	
1962	Mamma Roma	Yes	Yes	No	—	
1963	Ro.Go.Pa.G.	Yes	Yes	No	—	Segment: "La ricotta"
1963	La rabbia	Yes	Yes	No	—	Documentary
1964	The Gospel According to St. Matthew	Yes	Yes	No	—	
1965	Love Meetings	Yes	Yes	No	The Interviewer	Documentary
1965	Location Hunting in Palestine	Yes	Yes	No	Himself	Documentary
1966	The Hawks and the Sparrows	Yes	Yes	Yes	—	
1967	Requiescant	Yes	No	No	Don Juan	
1967	The Witches	Yes	Yes	No	—	Segment: "La Terra vista dalla Luna"
1967	Oedipus Rex	Yes	Yes	No	High Priest	
1968	Teorema	Yes	Yes	No	—	
1968	Appunti per un film sull'India	Yes	Yes	No	Himself	Documentary
1968	Caprice Italian Style	Yes	Yes	Yes	—	Segment: "Cosa sono le nuvole?"
1969	Love and Anger	Yes	Yes	No	—	Segment: "La sequenza del fiore di carta"
1969	Pigsty	Yes	Yes	No	—	
1969	Medea	Yes	Yes	No	—	
1970	Ostia	Yes	No	No	—	
1970	Notes Towards an African Orestes	Yes	Yes	No	Narrator (voice)	Documentary
1971	The Decameron	Yes	Yes	No	Giotto's Pupil	First in the Trilogy of Life.
1972	The Canterbury Tales	Yes	Yes	Yes	Chaucer	Second in the Trilogy of Life.
1973	Bawdy Tales	Yes	No	No	—	
1974	Arabian Nights	Yes	Yes	No	—	Third in the Trilogy of Life.
1975	Salò, or the 120 Days of Sodom	Yes	Yes	No	—	Released three weeks after his murder.

== Bibliography ==
=== Poetry ===
- Poesia a Casarsa. Bologna: Libreria Antiquaria Mario Landi, 1942.
- Diarii. Casarsa: Pubblicazioni dell'Academiuta, 1945.
- Poesie. San Vito al Tagliamento: Stamperia Primon, 1945.
- Dov'e la mia patria (with thirteen drawings by Giuseppe Zigaina). Casarsa: Edizioni dell'Academiuta, 1949.
- I pianti. Casrsa: pubblicazioni dell'Academiuta, 1946.
- Tal cour d'un frut. Tricesimo: Edizioni di Lingua Friulana, 1953.
- La meglio gioventu. Florence: Sansoni (Biblioteca di Paragone), 1954.
- Il canto populare. Milan: Garzanti, 1954
- Dal diario (1945-47). Caltanissetta: Sciascia, 1954.
  - New edition, with an introduction by Leonardo Sciascia and illustrations by G. Mazzullo, 1979.
- Le ceneri di Gramsci. Milan: Garzanti, 1957
  - new edition, with critical introduction by Walter Siti, Turin: Einaudi, 1981
- L'usignolo della chiesa cattolica. Milan: Longanesi, 1958.
  - New edition, Turin: Einaudi, 1976.
- Roma 1950: Diario. Milan: Scheiwiller, 1960.
- La religione del mio tempo. Milan: Garzanti, 1961.
  - New edition, Turin: Einaudi, 1982.
- Poesia in forma di rosa. Milan: Garzanti, 1964.
- Poesie dimenticate. Edited by L. Ciceri. Udine: Societa filologica friulana, 1965.
- Trasumanar e organizzar. Milan: Garzanti, 1971.
- La nuova gioventu: Poesie friulane 1941-1974. Turin: Einaudi, 1975.
- Le Poesie: Le ceneri di Gramsci. La religione del mio tempo, Poesia in forma di rosa, Trasumanar e organizzar. Milan: Garzanti, 1975.
- Pier Paolo Pasolini: Selected Poems. Translated and edited by Norman MacAfee and Luciano Martinengo. Foreword by Enzo Siciliano. Random House: New York, 1982.
- Roman Poems. Translated and edited by Lawrence Ferlinghetti and Francesca Valente. Introduction by Alberto Moravia. City Light Books: San Francisco, 1986.
- Bestemmia: Tutte le poesie. Edited by Graziella Chiarcossi and Walter Siti, preface by Giovanni Giudici. Milan: Garzanti, 2 vols., 1993
- Poesie scelte. Edited by Nico Naldini and Francesco Zambon. Milan: TEA, 1997.
- Tutte le poesie. Edited by Walter Siti. Milan: Mondadori Meridiani, 2 vols., 2003.
- The Selected Poetry of Pier Paolo Pasolini. Translated and edited by Stephen Sartarelli. Introduction by James Ivory. Chicago: The University of Chicago Press, 2014.

=== Fiction ===
- Ragazzi di vita. Milan: Garzanti, 1955.
  - Translated into English by Emile Capouya as The Ragazzi. New York: Grove Press Books, 1968.
  - Translated into English by Ann Goldstein as The Street Kids. : Europa Editions, 2016.
  - Translated into English by Tim Parks as Boys Alive. New York: NYRB Classics, 2023.
- Una vita vioenta. Milan: Garzanti, 1959.
  - New edition, Turin: Einaudi, 1979.
  - Translated into English by William Weaver as A Violent Life. London: Jonathan Cape, 1968.
- Il sogno di una cosa. Milan: Garzanti, 1962.
- Ali dagli occhi azzurri. Milan: Garzanti, 1965.
  - Selection of five stories published in English by John Shepley as Roman Nights and Other Stories. London: Quartet Books, 1994.
- Teorema. Milan: Garzanti, 1968.
  - Translated into English by Stuart Hood. London: Quartet Books, 1992.
- La Divina Mimesis. Turin: Einaudi, 1975.
  - New edition, Turin: Einaudi, 1979.
- Amado mio preceduta da Atti impuri. Edited by C. D'Angeli. Milan: Garzanti, 1982.
  - New edition, with an introduction by Walter Siti, 1993.
- Petrolio. Edited by M. Careri and Graziella Chiarcossi. Turin: Einaudi, 1992.
  - Translated into English by Ann Goldstein. New York: Alfred A Knopf, 1997.
- Un paese di temporali e di primule. Edited by Nico Naldini. Parma; Guanda, 1993.
- Romans, seguito da Un articolo per il "Progresso" e Operetta marina. Edited by Nico Naldini. Parma: Guanda, 1994.
- Storie della citta di Dio: Racconti e cronache romane (1950-1966). Edited by Walter Siti. Turin: Einaudi, 1995.
  - Translated into English by Marina Harss as Stories from the City of God: Sketches and Chronicles of Rome 1950-1966. New York: Other Press, 2003.
- Romanzi e racconti. Edited by Walter Siti and Silvia De Laude. Milan: Mondadori Meridiani, 2 vols., 1998.

=== Plays ===
- Italie Magique, in Potentissima Signora. Songs and dialogues written for Laura Betti. Milan: Longanesi, 1965.
- Calderón. Milan: Garzanti, 1973.
- I Turcs tal Friul (I Turchi in Friuli). Edited by Luigi Ciceri. Udine: Forum Julii, 1976.
  - (New edition edited by A. Noferi Ciceri, Udine: Società filologica friuliana, 1995.)
- Affabulazione-Pilade. Presented by Attilio Bertolucci. Milan: Garzanti, 1977.
- Porcile, Orgia, Bestia da stile. With a note by Arturo Roncaglia. Milan: Garzanti, 1979.
- Teatro (Calderón, Affabulazione, Pilade, Porcile, Orgia, Bestia da stile). Preface by G. Davico Bonino. Milan: Garzanti, 1988.
- Affabulazione. With a note by G. Davico Bonino. Turin: Einaudi, 1992.
  - Translated into English as Manifesto for a New Theatre Followed by Infabulation by Thomas Simpson. Toronto: University of Toronto Press, 2008.
- Teatro. Edited by Walter Siti and Silvia De Laude. Milan: Mondadori, 2001.

=== Published Screenplays ===
- Accattone. Edizioni FM: Rome, 1961.
- La commare secca, co-written with Bernardo Bertolucci and Sergio Citti. Milan: Zibetti, 1962.
- Mamma Roma. Milan: Rizzoli, 1962.
- Il Vangelo secondo Matteo. Milan: Garzanti, 1964.
- Ali Dagli occhi azzurri (with La notte brava, La ricotta, Accattone, Mamma Roma)
- Il padre selvaggio. "Cinema e Film" issues 3 and 4, 1967.
  - Republished in book form. Einaudi: Turin, 1975.
- Edipo re. Milan: Garzanti Editore, 1967.
  - Translated into English by John Mathews as Oedipus Rex. London: Lorrimer Publishing Ltd, 1971.
- Teorema. Milan: Garzanti, 1968.
- Che cosa sono le nuvole?. "Cinema e Film" issues 7 and 8, 1969.
- Medea. Milan: Garzanti, 1970.
- Ostia, co-written with Sergio Citti. Milan: Garzanti, 1971.
- Trilogia della vita (Decameron, I racconti di Canterbury, Il fiore delle mille e una notte). Bologna: Cappelli, 1971.
- San Paolo. Turin: Einaudi, 1977.
  - Translated into English as St. Paul: A Screenplay by Elizabeth A. Castelli. Preface by Alain Badiou. Introduction by Ward Blanton and Elizabeth A. Castelli. Edited by Elizabeth A. Castelli. London: Verso, 2025.

=== Essays ===
- Passione e ideologia (1948–1958). Milan: Garzanti, 1960.
  - New edition with an introduction by Cesare Segre, Turin: Einaudi, 1985.
  - New edition with a preface by Alberto Asor Rosa, Milan: Garzanti, 1994.
- Empirismo eretico. Milan: Garzanti, 1972.
  - Translated into English by Ben Lawton and Louise K. Barnett as Heretical Empiricism. Edited by Louise K. Barnett. Bloomington: Indiana University Press, 1988.
- L'Odore dell'India. Milan: Longanesi & C. S. p. A., 1974.
  - Translated into English by David Price as The Scent of India. The Olive Press: London, 1984.
- Scritti corsari. Milan: Garzanti, 1975.
  - (New edition with a preface by Alfonso Bernardinelli, 1990.)
- Lettere luterane. Turin: Einaudi, 1976.
  - Translated into English by Stuart Hood as Lutheran Letters. Carcanet Press: New York, 1987.
- Descrizioni di descrizioni. Edited by Graziella Chiarcossi. Turin: Einaudi, 1979. (New edition with a preface by G. Dossena, Milan: Garzanti, 1996.)
- Il Portico della Morte. Edited by Cesare Segre. Milan: Garzanti, 1988.
- I film degli altri. Edited by Tullio Kezich. Parma: Guanda, 1996.
- Saggi sulla letteratura e sull’arte. Edited by Walter Siti and Silvia De Laude, 2 vols. Milan: Mondadori, 1999.
- Saggi sulla politica e sulla società. Edited by Walter Siti and Silvia De Laude, 2 vols. Milan: Mondadori, 1999.
- Pasolini: The Massacre Game. Translated by Anna Battista. Edited by Stephen Barber. The Sun Vision Press, 2013.
- Heretical Aesthetics: Pasolini on Painting. Edited and translated with an introduction by Ara H. Merjian and Alessandro Giammei. Foreword by T. J. Clark. London: Verso, 2023.

=== Correspondence ===
- Le belle bandiere: Dialoghi 1960–65. Edited by GianCarlo Ferretti. Rome: Editori Riuniti, 1977.
- Il Caos. Edited by GianCarlo Ferretti. Rome: Editori Riuniti, 1979.
- Lettere 1940–1954. Edited by Nico Naldini. Turin: Einaudi, 1986.
  - Translated into English as The Letters of Pier Paolo Pasolini, vol. 1: 1940-1954 by Stuart Hood. London: Quartet Books, 1992.
- Lettere 1955–1975. Edited by Nico Naldini. Turin: Einaudi, 1988.
- I dialoghi. Edited by G. Falaschi, with a preface by GianCarlo Ferretti. Rome: Editori Riuniti, 1992.
- Pier Paolo Pasolini, Vita attraverso le lettere. Edited by Nico Naldini. Turin: Einaudi, 1994.

=== Interviews ===
- Duflot, Jean. Entretiens avec Pier Paolo Pasolini (1969). Paris: Belfond, 1970.
  - Second edition, expanded, P. P. Pasolini, les dernières paroles d’un impie (1969–1975). Edited by Jean Duflot. Paris: Belfond, 1981.
- Gulinucci, M., ed. Interviste corsare sulla politica e sulla vita 1955–1975. Rome: Liberal Atlantide Editorial, 1995.
- Magrelli, E., ed. Con Pier Paolo Pasolini. (“Quaderni di film critica.”) Rome: Bulzoni, 1977.
- Stack, Oswald. Pasolini on Pasolini (1968). London: Thames and Hudson, 1969.

== See also ==
- Pasolini (film)
- La macchinazione
- List of atheists in film, radio, television and theater
- List of unsolved murders (1900–1979)
