= Mamma Roma =

1962 film by Pier Paolo Pasolini

- Theatrical poster
- Directed by: Pier Paolo Pasolini
- Written by: Pier Paolo Pasolini
- Produced by: Alfredo Bini
- Starring: Anna Magnani; Ettore Garofolo; Franco Citti
- Cinematography: Tonino Delli Colli
- Edited by: Nino Baragli
- Music by: Antonio Vivaldi
- Production company: Arco Film
- Distributed by: Cineriz
- Release date: 31 August 1962 (Italy)
- Running time: 106 minutes
- Country: Italy
- Language: Italian

Mamma Roma is a 1962 Italian drama film written and directed by Pier Paolo Pasolini, starring Anna Magnani, Ettore Garofolo, and Franco Citti.

== Synopsis ==
After her pimp Carmine marries, prostitute Mamma Roma starts a new life as a marketer in Rome to enable her 16-year-old son Ettore a better life. She finds him a job as a waiter by blackmailing a trattoria owner and tries to draw him away from his thieving friends and occasional streetwalker Bruna. When Mamma Roma is forced back into prostitution by Carmine and Ettore finds out about it, he returns to his previous habits. Caught during a theft in a hospital, Ettore dies in jail from a fever, leaving behind his grieving, desperate mother.

== Cast ==
- Anna Magnani as Mamma Roma
- Ettore Garofolo as Ettore
- Franco Citti as Carmine
- Silvana Corsini as Bruna
- Luisa Loiano as Biancofiore
- Paolo Volponi as Priest
- Luciano Gonini as Zacaria

== Production and release ==
Pasolini based his screenplay for Mamma Roma on the true case of Marcello Elisei, who had died in prison. Shooting began on 9 April 1962, with a cast that largely consisted of non-professionals. Pasolini, unhappy with Magnani's interpretation of the title role, expanded Citti's role of Carmine, but the production was temporarily halted when Citti was arrested for a petty crime. Filming took place in the Parco degli Acquedotti on the ancient Appian Way; the dome of San Giovanni Bosco in Via Tuscolana is seen prominently in several scenes.

On 31 August 1962, Mamma Roma premiered at the Venice Film Festival. On the same day, a police complaint was filed, claiming that the film was "offensive to good morals" and "contrary to public decency" for the language used, but the complaint was turned down by a magistrate five days later. On the night of the film's release in the Quattro Fontane Cinema in Rome on 22 September 1962, Pasolini was confronted with protesting neo-fascists and got involved in a scuffle. Mamma Roma also met with criticism from the left, and its domestic box office was a humble 168 million lira.

== Reception ==
On the review aggregator website Rotten Tomatoes, 95% of 20 critics' reviews are positive.
