= The Decameron (film) =

1971 film by Pier Paolo Pasolini

Il Decameron
- Il Decameron film poster
- Directed by: Pier Paolo Pasolini
- Written by: Pier Paolo Pasolini
- Based on: The Decameron by Giovanni Boccaccio
- Produced by: Alberto Grimaldi
- Starring: Franco Citti; Ninetto Davoli; Vincenzo Amato; Angela Luce; Giuseppe Zigaina; Pier Paolo Pasolini; Silvana Mangano
- Cinematography: Tonino Delli Colli
- Edited by: Nino Baragli; Tatiana Casini Morigi
- Music by: Ennio Morricone
- Production company: Produzioni Europee Associate; Les Productions Artistes Associés; Artemis Films
- Distributed by: United Artists
- Release dates: 29 June 1971 (Berlin); 25 August 1971 (Italy); 29 October 1971 (France)
- Running time: 106 minutes
- Countries: Italy; France; West Germany
- Languages: Italian; Neapolitan; German; Latin
- Box office: 11,167,557 admissions (Italy)

The Decameron (Italian: Il Decameron) is a 1971 sex comedy anthology film written and directed by Pier Paolo Pasolini, based on the 14th-century collection of stories by Giovanni Boccaccio. It is the first film of Pasolini's Trilogy of Life, the others being The Canterbury Tales and Arabian Nights. Each film was an adaptation of a different piece of classical literature focusing on ribald, earthy and often irreligious themes. The tales contain abundant nudity, sex, slapstick and toilet humour.

Pasolini's intention was not to faithfully recreate the world of Boccaccio's characters but to criticise the contemporary world through metaphorical use of the themes present in the stories. The novella's settings are often changed to southern Italy and use the Neapolitan dialect to signify the mistreatment and economic exploitation of the poorer region by the richer northern parts of Italy.

The film was entered into the 21st Berlin International Film Festival, where it won the Silver Bear Extraordinary Jury Prize.

== Plot ==
Prologue: In a frame story, Giotto (played by Pasolini) arrives in Naples to paint a mural. Ser Ciappelletto commits a murder and hides the body.

Andreuccio of Perugia: In the first episode (based on Second day, fifth tale), Andreuccio of Perugia has come to Naples to buy horses. A prostitute plans to rob him of his money by inviting him to supper under the pretext that they are estranged siblings. Retiring for bed, Andreuccio undresses and uses a booby trap lavatory that drops him into a trough of excrement. He escapes and meets two thieves attempting the robbery of the lately-deceased Archbishop's jewels at a nearby church. Andreuccio agrees to climb into the lidded tomb and finds the Archbishops's prized ring, which he plots to keep for himself, but the thieves refuse to re-open the lid until he presents it. Later, more thieves enter with the same plan, encouraging their leader to enter the tomb because "dead men don't bite". Andreuccio bites his leg and the thieves run in terror while Andreuccio prances away with his new ring.

Ciappelletto, the Thief: In Naples, an old man is reading to an interested crowd a bawdy story (based on Ninth day, second tale). A nun, Isabetta, is having an affair with a man. When the other nuns discover this they rush to tell the Mother Superior, who they interrupt while she is having sex with a priest. She accidentally puts his underwear on her head, mistaking it for her veil. Isabetta points out the underwear and the nuns all realize the Mother Superior is guilty of the same sin. From that day forth, the nuns all get lovers.

While this story is being told, Ser Ciappelletto is picking pockets of men caught up in the story. He gives some money to a male child in exchange for sexual intercourse and the scene ends.

Masetto da Lamporecchio: In the second episode (based on Third day, First tale), a young man, Masetto da Lamporecchio, is encouraged by a gardener to seek work at a local convent filled with many beautiful women. Masetto pretends to be deaf and mute to convince the pious Abbess to accept him in spite of his handsomeness. While tending the garden, two nuns decide to have sex with him because he cannot tell anyone, but the other sisters discover this and prove collectively insatiable. When the Abbess also commands him to have sex with her, he breaks his silence to protest that he cannot keep up with the nuns' demands. She declares his sudden speech a miracle from God, assuring him that he will be made a saint and that they will reach an arrangement to keep him satisfied.

Peronella: In the third episode (based on Seventh day, second tale), Peronella cuckolds her dimwitted husband with her lover Giannello when he unexpectedly returns home. Peronella hides Giannello in a large pot, but her husband reveals he has found a buyer for the pot, so Peronella tells him that she has found a more generous buyer, explaining Giannello's presence. Giannello demands that the pot be cleaned before he buys it, so the husband climbs inside. Peronella points to different spots in the pot, instructing her husband in how to scrape the right spots while Giannello penetrates her.

Ser Ciappelletto of Prato: In the fourth episode (based on First day, first tale), which begins in Prato, Ser Ciappelletto, a Neapolitan merchant, is sent to make a deal in Germany by his employer. Ciappelletto is sinful, blasphemous, and is homosexual, so his master sends him to Burgundy where he is unknown. He dines with two fellow Neapolitans who are usurers. That night, Ciappelletto has an ominous dream that he is being paraded around while wrapped in a burial shroud while around him friars and monks play volleyball with human skulls. He reaches Burgundy, where he falls into a serious illness in the usurers' house. They are outraged because if they turn him out they will be seen as bad hosts, but if his crimes are revealed in confession they will draw attention. Ciappelletto devises a plan to confess and calls a monk to tell him several lies and half-truths that make him seem very pure, while pretending to cringe over venial sins. In his dying breaths, he tells the monk that he has never had sex with a woman (leaving out that he is homosexual) which the monk sees as particularly chaste as he is handsome. The monk is amazed at Ciappelletto's virtue, and he is venerated as a saint. After the eulogy, many poor, disabled and sick people enter to touch his body in praise. The two Neapolitans look at each other in amazement that his plan worked.

Giotto's Pupil: In a brief intermission (based on Sixth day, fifth tale), a pupil of the great painter Giotto is on his way to paint the Basilica of Santa Chiara with his companion Messer Forese da Rabatta. The cart he is in is stopped by the rain and they take cover with a toothless farmer nearby named Gennari who gives the passengers clothes. The pupil of Giotto and da Rabatta arrive at the church while dressed in these tattered outfits. The two begin painting the basilica's walls after watching passersby in a market for visual inspiration. He spots some market-goers who will serve as the actors in the next segment about Caterina and Ricciardo. The other stories of the film continue afterwards.

Caterina di Valbona and Riccardo: In the fifth episode (based on Fifth day, fourth tale), the beautiful Caterina and wealthy Ricciardo fall in love while playing hide and seek. To give them an opportunity to have sex, she asks her parents whether she can sleep on the roof-terrace so she may hear the nightingale sing, where Ricciardo scales the wall. They have sex and fall asleep, but at dawn Caterina's father discovers them entwined. The mother begins to scream, but the father explains that the pair would be a good match as Ricciardo's family would improve their social standing and bring them money. The father wakes the pair and threatens Ricciardo's life, to which he promises to promptly wed Caterina; the father officiates the ceremony immediately and the parents leave them to consummate the marriage.

Elizabeth of Messina and Lorenzo the Sicilian: In the sixth episode (based on Fourth day, Fifth tale), set in Messina, a girl, Elizabeth, attractive and possessing great wealth, falls in love with Lorenzo, a young Sicilian employee of her brothers. However, her brothers discover their love and become furious. They invite Lorenzo to their private garden under the pretenses of having lunch but then stab him in the back with a dagger in order to save their family's honour. They bury Lorenzo's body in the garden. He appears to the grieving Elizabeth in a vision and reveals his body's whereabouts. Elizabeth finds the body, removes the head, and hides it in a pot of basil that she tends to daily.

Gemmata: In the seventh episode (based on Ninth day, tenth tale), the commoner Pietro and his wife Gemmata have a guest named Don Gianni who is staying with them. Their neighbor Zita is getting married, which means Gemmata can't stay with her, so all three must share the same house. Gemmata and Pietro sleep in the bedroom and Don Gianni is in the stable. Don Gianni, using his cunning, tells Pietro and Gemmata that Gemmata can be turned into horse and then back into a human, so she can be used to sow the fields of her husband's farm. Don Gianni can make this happen only with a special spell. The spell is a ruse: the doctor has imagined a ritual to enable him to have sex with the woman, in full view of her husband. Don Gianni strips Gemmata naked in front of Pietro and grabs her breasts, hair, back and bottom, and describes how each part will appear when she is a mare. At the last part he is about to stick his penis into her and calls it her "tail". Pietro screams that he doesn't want a tail. Don Gianni turns around and tells Pietro that his screaming ruined it so now she can't turn into a horse.

Heaven and Hell: The eighth episode (based on Seventh day, tenth tale) involves two characters from Naples named Meuccio and Tingoccio who agree to tell each other about Heaven or Hell when they die. After a time, Tingoccio dies. Meuccio is afraid for his soul because he had sex out of wedlock with his girlfriend so many times. One night he has a dream in which his friend tells him that he is in Limbo, and though the angels knew of all his sins they do not consider sex a mortal sin as they had believed. Meuccio runs through the streets to his girlfriend and they have sex.

Epilogue: Giotto admires his completed fresco, which illustrates episodes of the film, and muses "Why create a work of art when dreaming about it is so much sweeter?"

== List of tales ==
- Second day, fifth tale - a young boy from Perugia is swindled twice, but ends up becoming rich.
- Ninth day, second tale - a Mother Superior reprimands a nun for having sex with a man but it becomes clear she is guilty of the same sin (translated into Neapolitan by an old man and listened to by a crowd).
- Third day, first tale - a man pretends to be a deaf-mute in a convent of curious nuns.
- Seventh day, second tale - a woman must hide her lover when her husband comes home unexpectedly.
- First day, first tale - a scoundrel fools a priest on his deathbed.
- Fifth day, fourth tale - a young girl sleeps on the roof to meet her boyfriend at night.
- Fourth day, fifth tale - three brothers take revenge on their sister's lover.
- Ninth day, tenth tale - a man tries to seduce the wife of his friend.
- Seventh day, tenth tale - two friends make a pact to find out what happens after death.
- Sixth day, fifth tale - two painters are stopped in the rain and are given new clothes.
- Third day, tenth tale - in Tunisia a princess escapes into the wilderness where a monk tricks her into having sex with him. This scene was removed and is now presumed lost.
- Fourth day, eighth tale - a man goes on a journey to Paris and returns to his hometown to find the woman he loves married. He dies of grief. She sees this and then lays by his side and dies too. This scene was removed and is now presumed lost.

== Cast ==
- Franco Citti as Ciappelletto of Prato
- Ninetto Davoli as Andreuccio of Perugia
- Vincenzo Amato as Masetto of Lamporecchio
- Maria Gabriella Maione as Madonna Fiordaliso
- Angela Luce as Peronella
- Giuseppe Zigaina as German Monk
- Pier Paolo Pasolini as Giotto's Pupil
- Giacomo Rizzo as Friend of Giotto's Pupil
- Guido Alberti as Musciatto
- Elisabetta Genovese as Caterina
- Giorgio Iovine as Lizio of Valbona
- Lino Crispo as Don Gianni
- Vittorio Vittori as Don Giovanni
- Vincenzo Ferrigno as Giannello
- Silvana Mangano as La Madonna
- Gianni Rizzo as Father Superior
- Monique van Vooren as Queen of Skulls
- Giani Esposito
- Guido Mannari

== Credits ==
- Director: Pier Paolo Pasolini
- Written by: Pier Paolo Pasolini
- Based on: the stories of Giovanni Boccaccio
- Executive producer: Franco Rossellini
- Producer: Alberto Grimaldi
- Assistant directors: Sergio Citti, Umberto Angelucci
- Director of photography: Tonino Delli Colli
- Supervising editor: Enzo Ocone
- Editors: Nino Baragli, Tatiana Morigi
- Art director: Dante Ferretti
- Costumes: Danilo Donati
- Music selections by: Pier Paolo Pasolini
- Musical collaborator: Ennio Morricone
- Continuity: Beatrice Banfi

== Relation to Boccaccio's original text ==
The adaptation of Boccaccio's Decameron by Pasolini has been debated. He "abandons the framing device in the book, placing us instead in a fluid world in which one story runs into another." He also changes the location from Florence to Naples and uses the Neapolitan dialect. This also enables Pasolini to put commentaries on the class conflicts and economic exploitation of the contemporary society in the stories. "By grafting the marginal modern (the Italian lumpen poor, the third world) onto medieval texts, Pasolini hoped to fashion an alternative to a present that he found ever more repellent."

According to Ben Lawton, "Pasolini's intention was not to recreate the medieval world of Boccaccio's characters but instead to comment on contemporary Italian society through the metaphorical use of the original novellas of the Decameron. Pasolini dismantles the bourgeois frame of the brigata and replaces it with two subframes composed of modified novellas from the Decameron. ... chose particular stories from the Decameron to reverse Boccaccio's original intention and comment on the class conflict." "Boccaccio relied upon various sources for the Decameron, such as the French fabliaux tradition, contemporary chronicles, medieval romances, Italian folklore, exempla and others, in the same way that Pasolini's filmic text incorporates the original work with Marxist overtones and references to his past cinematic works."

== Production ==
=== Filming locations ===
- Naples, Italy - the tale of Andreuccio and the tomb robbers.
- Villa Cimbrone, Ravello, Italy - the church of the aroused nuns in the Masetto de Lamprecchio story.
- Loire Valley, Maine-et-Loire, France - the German city in the tale of Ser Ciappalletto.
- Caserta Vecchia, Caserta, Campania, Italy - story of Peronella hiding her lover in a jar.
- Sanaa, Yemen - Gafsa, Tunisia in the Alibech story set in Alibech's palace (deleted and now lost scene).
- Mount Vesuvius, Italy - Rustico's hermit abode in the Sahara desert (deleted and now lost scene).
- Paris, France - tale of Girolamo and Salvestra (deleted and lost scene).
- Safa-Palatino, Rome, Lazio, Italy - miscellaneous interiors

=== Score ===
The soundtrack of the film mainly consists of pre-existing music. In consultation with Ennio Morricone, Pier Paolo Pasolini chose representative examples of Italian folk songs from different localities and Latin mediaeval chants. The album Italian Folk Music, Vol. 5: Naples and Campania compiled by Alan Lomax for Folkways records was heavily drawn from. The following is a list of the musical cues:

- "Zesa Viola/ la Zita in cerca di un marito" (The Maid in Search of a Husband)" - mediaeval Neapolitan song
- "Canto dei portatori" (Porters' Song)" - folkloric Positano chant
- "Serenata popolare campana" (popular Serenade of Campania)" - traditional Cilentan song
- "Canto delle lavandaie del Vomero" (Song of the Washerwomen of Vomero)" - popular Neapolitan song
- "Ballo del tamburo" (Tambourine Dance)" - "tammurriata": the folk dance from Campania
- "Mittit ad virginem" (To the Virgin He Sends)" - Latin sacred chant
- "La pampanella" (The Little Leaf)" - traditional polyphonic singing in the Irpinian dialect
- "Fenesta ca lucive" (The Window That Used to Shine)" - Neapolitan Romantic song
- "Canto delle olivare" (Song of the Olive Trees)" - Neapolitan folk song
- "Veni Sancte Spiritus" - Latin sacred chant
- "La Cammesella" (The Camisole)" - Neapolitan folk song
- "Am blim blom" - Neapolitan Nursery rhyme/"filastrocche"
- "Ninna nanna popolare campana (Popular lullaby from Campania)" - Neapolitan folk song
- "Tarantellа" - vivid Neapolitan dance
- "Canti di venditori (Songs of the Street Vendors)" - mix of different folk songs
- "Mass of Tournai: Kyrie eleison" - mediaeval polyphonic mass in Latin

=== Deleted scenes ===
Two scenes were deleted from the film: the story of Girolamo and Salvestra and the story of Rustico and Alibech. Pasolini removed Girolamo because he felt it was a weaker story, and he removed Alibech because he wanted to save the Yemen scenery as a surprise for his later film Arabian Nights, the third film in his Trilogy of Life. Despite much searching by Laura Betti neither have turned up though the Alibech scene still survives on the script and has been recreated using stills from the film. This recreation is available for viewing in the documentary The Lost Body of Alibech.

In Gafsa, the princess Alibech lives with her family in contentment. She is interested in learning about Christianity though her Muslim family try to dissuade her from this. She goes off into the Sahara desert to learn from the Desert Fathers. She meets two monks who tell her to continue on. She meets a third monk named Rustico and stays with him. He is very aroused by her and tells her that his penis is the Devil and her vagina is Hell and that the Devil must be sent back to Hell by God's own order until "the pride vanishes from his head". They do this six times. Alibech is very interested in continuing with this while Rustico is tired out. Meanwhile, in Gafsa, Alibech's family die in a fire so the warlord Neerbale rides out into the desert with his men to retrieve Alibech and bring her home in safety. They take her away much to Rustico's chagrin. Back in Gafsa, Alibech is bathing. She tells her female servants that it was wrong for Neerbale to steal her away when she was learning about the Christian God and doing such great things as sending the Devil to Hell. They ask her what she means and she explains. They laugh and tell her that Neerbale will do that with her too so she must not worry.

== Reception ==
The Decameron was the third most popular film in Italy in 1971 with 11,167,557 admissions behind The Godfather and the Italian ...continuavano a chiamarlo Trinità. It was the 21st most popular film in Italy of all-time and is currently ranked 25th.

== Home video ==
The film was released by the Criterion Collection in a 3-BD box set Trilogy of Life.
