= Oedipus Rex (1967 film) =

Italian film by Pier Paolo Pasolini

- Directed by: Pier Paolo Pasolini
- Screenplay by: Pier Paolo Pasolini
- Based on: Oedipus Rex (429 BC play) by Sophocles
- Produced by: Alfredo Bini
- Starring: Silvana Mangano; Franco Citti; Alida Valli; Carmelo Bene; Julian Beck; Luciano Bartoli; Francesco Leonetti; Ahmed Belhachmi; Giovanni Ivan Scratuglia; Giandomenico Davoli; Ninetto Davoli
- Cinematography: Giuseppe Ruzzolini
- Edited by: Nino Baragli
- Production company: Arco Film
- Distributed by: Euro International Films
- Release date: September 3, 1967 (Venice)
- Running time: 104 minutes
- Country: Italy
- Language: Italian

Oedipus Rex (Italian: Edipo re) is a 1967 Italian film written and directed by Pier Paolo Pasolini, based upon the Greek tragedy Oedipus Rex written by Sophocles in 428 BC. It stars Pasolini's regular collaborator Franco Citti in the titular role, along with Alida Valli, Carmelo Bene and Julian Beck.

This was Pasolini's first feature-length color film, but followed his use of color in "The Earth Seen from the Moon" episode in the anthology film The Witches (1967). Principal photography took place mainly in Morocco, in Ouarzazate, Ait-Ben-Haddou and Zagora; as well as in Italy.

The film was premiered in-competition at the 28th Venice International Film Festival, where it was nominated for the Golden Lion. It was nominated for five Nastro d'Argento Awards, and won for Best Producer and Best Production Design.

== Plot ==
A son is born to a young couple in pre-war Italy. The child opens his eyes for the first time to see his loving mother and suckles on her breast. The father is motivated by jealousy, and believes the child will take away the love of his wife and send him back into the void. The soldier takes the baby into the desert to be abandoned, at which point the film's setting changes to the ancient world of Greece. The child is rescued and taken to the King of Corinth Polybus and Queen Merope of Corinth and raised as their own son because they are infertile. The child is given the name Oedipus.

Oedipus grows up believing that he is the biological son of Polybus and Merope. One day while cheating at a sports game an angry classmate calls him a foundling which enrages him. This torments and confuses him on the inside and plagues him with bad dreams and a feeling of ill omen. He asks his parents to visit the Oracle of Delphi in order to find out the opinions of the god Apollo. He travels to the Oracle alone. The Oracle tells him that his fate is to kill his father and make love to his mother. She laughs at him and tells him to begone and to not contaminate people with his presence. Oedipus leaves Oracle and decides not to return to Corinth. He deliberately chooses directions at random as he wanders in the desert. As he is walking down the sacred road of Apollo he is stopped by a wagon and some armed soldiers. King Laius who is on the wagon treats Oedipus as a beggar and orders him to get off the road. Oedipus hurls a huge stone breaking the legs of one of the soldiers. He tactically runs off with soldiers at his tail. Oedipus then kills soldiers one by one before returning to the wagon where he kills king Laius and the wounded soldier. Laius's servant runs away and survives.

After an unspecified period, Oedipus comes across roving bands of displaced people fleeing the Sphinx that has terrorized the country of Thebes. It has caused so much death that Queen Jocasta has promised to marry anyone who can kill it. Oedipus casts the sphinx down into the abyss while the sphinx warns him of the abyss that is within him. The triumphant Oedipus is married to Queen Jocasta who is, unbeknownst to him, his biological mother. After Oedipus is made king, a plague occurs and kills much of the city. Oedipus sends his brother-in-law Creon to the Oracle to receive news about how to stop it. Creon returns and tells him that for the plague to end, King Laius' killer must be brought to justice.

Oedipus sends for the blind prophet Tiresias to find out the name of the killer. Tiresias is reluctant to speak because he knows it will cause injury to both himself and Oedipus. Oedipus prods him to continue and Tiresias tells him that Oedipus is the killer. Oedipus banishes him from the city believing that his brother-in-law Creon put him up to it in order to steal the throne. Jocasta reveals to Oedipus that Laius was killed at the crossroads of Apollo's sacred road. She also tells him that the Oracle has been wrong before. The Oracle predicted Jocasta's son would kill his father so she sent for him to be killed in the desert.

Oedipus realizes with horror that the Oracle's prophecy has been fulfilled and that Jocasta and Laius were his birth parents. The old servant who brought Oedipus to the desert is called for and admits to him the truth. Jocasta commits suicide by hanging and Oedipus blinds himself.

The scene then changes again to modern Italy where Oedipus roams from town to town playing the flute. He returns to the meadow where he first opened his eyes as a child and finds peace.

== Cast ==
- Franco Citti as Oedipus
- Silvana Mangano as Jocasta
- Alida Valli as Merope
- Carmelo Bene as Creon
- Julian Beck as Tiresias
- Ahmed Belhachmi as Polybus
- Ninetto Davoli as Angelo
- Luciano Bartoli as Laius
- Francesco Leonetti as Laius' servant
- Giandomenico Davoli as shepherd
- Ivan Scratuglia as priest

Uncredited

- Laura Betti as Jocasta's maid
- Pier Paolo Pasolini as high priest
- Isabel Ruth as a maid

== Style ==
The film's style is intentionally ahistorical and uses various cultural motifs to create an otherworldly environment. The actors are Italian and Berber, the film is shot in Morocco, and the music is largely taken from Romanian folk music, but also from East Asian nations such as Indonesia and Japan. The costumes are also heavily stylized with medieval knight helmets and broad-brimmed straw hats and top hats fitted with wings. Many of the costumes use African, Aztec and Sumerian influences.

Pasolini begins and ends the film in 1920s Italy in what he calls an act of Freudian Sublimation. Oedipus plays the traditional Japanese gagaku theme on his pipe and follows it with a Russian folk song about resistance.

== Production ==
=== Crew ===
- Director: Pier Paolo Pasolini
- Written by: Pier Paolo Pasolini
- Based on the play by: Sophocles
- Produced by Alfredo Bini
- Cinematography: Giuseppe Ruzzolini
- Edited by: Nino Baragli
- Production design: Luigi Scaccianoce, Dante Ferretti
- Set decoration: Andrea Fantacci
- Costume design: Danilo Donati
- Sound: Carlo Tarchi

=== Comparisons to source material ===
The entire second part of the film is faithfully adapted from Sophocles' play Oedipus Rex. Much of the dialogue is taken straight from Sophocles. The first half depicts the events leading up to the play and is Pasolini's depiction of them with his own poetic style. The beginning and end of the film in 1920s Italy is an invention of Pasolini.

=== Filming locations ===
Pasolini originally began scouting locations in Romania for his film. He wanted a rugged, stark landscape that would resemble Greece. However he found Romania to be a modern industrialized country, where old wooden villages were a rarity. He was dismayed that he would have to choose a different location. He settled on Morocco, a land filled with mountains and desert which bears little resemblance to Greece. However it would suit the needs of his film.

The film was shot in Ouarzazate, Ait-Ben-Haddou and Zagora. The film uses many local extras from those cities. The early-20th-century prologue scenes were shot in Casaletto Lodigiano and Sant'Angelo Lodigiano, Italy. The epilogue was shot in Piazza Maggiore in Bologna. Miscellaneous interiors were shot at Dino De Laurentiis' studios in Rome.

=== Score ===
The score is composed heavily of Romanian folk music taken from the Electrecord release titled Anthology of Romanian folk music. Pasolini chose this music for its ambiguous sound and language. Originally he had wanted to shoot the film in Romania as he felt it would be a good stand in for Ancient Greece but he had to leave due to the country being modern and industralized which wasn't the ancient-like setting he wanted. Writing on the matter he said "I gave up the idea of doing it there, but in recompense I found some folk-tunes which I liked a lot because they are extremely ambiguous: they are half-way between Slavic, Greek and Arab songs, they are indefinable: it is unlikely that anyone who didn't have specialized knowledge could locate them; they are a bit outside history […] I wanted music which was a-historical, a-temporal". Other music used is the Japanese Gagaku theme and the Indonesian Kecak.

Antonio Fuselli's Marcetta Bandistica also opens and closes the film. It is the theme of the father. Mozart's String Quartet No.19 in C major K 465 serves as the theme of the mother. It is played to introduce the mother in the 1920s scene and is played several times on the flute by the blind prophet Tiresias. It brings to mind Oedipus' struggle with Jocasta and the hidden knowledge of his own birth.

Otto Stransky's tango In Santa Lucia is played in the opening scene set in the 1920s era. At the end of the film, Oedipus plays both the Gagaku and the resistance song Funeral March of 1905 on his flute.

== Themes ==
Since Accattone, Pasolini had planned and hinted at making a film about the Oedipus Complex and its certain "autobiographical anxiety". Pasolini said of the film "in Oedipus, I tell the story of my complex of Oedipus. The child in the prologue is me, his father is my father, an infantry officer, and his mother, a teacher, is my mother. I tell my mythical life, naturally made epic by the legend of Oedipus." Pasolini's father Carlo Alberto Pasolini was a lieutenant in the Italian army and had a prominent Fascist leaning. The film can be seen as a sharp rebuke of Pasolini's own father and the militaristic, bourgeois Italy he had born into.

Another theme is the guilt of innocence, a reversal of original sin. Oedipus is aware of a problem in his life but he does not know what it is. Oedipus becomes the symbol of western man. He is blinded by the will of not knowing who he is and ignores the truth of his condition which leads him to catastrophe. To act as the counterpoint to modern man, the setting of ancient Greece is reconstructed in Morocco. It is an ahistorical, otherworldly setting outside of the confines of the modern bourgeois world.

== Reception ==
On the review aggregator website Rotten Tomatoes, 89% of 9 critics' reviews are positive.

=== Accolades ===
Venice Film Festival
Nominated for Golden Lion
1967

Italian National Syndicate of Film Journalist Won

- Silver Ribbon
- Alfredo Bini for Best Producer
- Luigi Scaccianoce for Best Production Design

1968

Kinema Junpo Awards
Won Best Foreign Language Film
1970

== See also ==
- Oedipus Rex – Classical Athenian tragedy by Sophocles
- Self-fulfilling prophecy – Prediction that causes itself to become true
