= Dante Ferretti =

Italian production designer

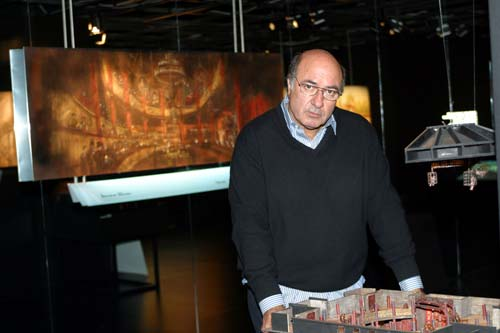
- Dante Ferretti in his workshop
- Born: 26 February 1943 (age 83); Macerata, Italy
- Occupation: Production designer
- Years active: 1964–present
- Spouse: Francesca Lo Schiavo

Dante Ferretti (Italian pronunciation: [ˈdante ferˈretti]; born 26 February 1943) is an Italian production designer, art director, and costume designer.

== Biography ==
Throughout his career, Ferretti has worked with many acclaimed directors, both American and Italian, including Pier Paolo Pasolini, Elio Petri, Federico Fellini, Liliana Cavani, Terry Gilliam, Franco Zeffirelli, Martin Scorsese, Anthony Minghella, and Tim Burton.

He frequently collaborates with his wife, set decorator Francesca Lo Schiavo.

Ferretti was a protégé of Federico Fellini, and worked under him for five films. He also had a five-film collaboration with Pier Paolo Pasolini and later developed a very close professional relationship with Martin Scorsese, designing nine of his films.

In 2008, he designed the set for Howard Shore's opera The Fly, directed by David Cronenberg, at the Théâtre du Châtelet in Paris.

Ferretti has won three Academy Awards for Best Art Direction: The Aviator, Sweeney Todd: The Demon Barber of Fleet Street, and Hugo. He had seven previous nominations. In addition, he was nominated for Best Costume Design for Kundun. He has also won three BAFTA Awards.

In 2012, he designed the decor for Salumeria Rosi Parmacotto, a restaurant on Manhattan's Upper East Side.

For the 2015 Expo held in Milan, Italy Ferretti was commissioned to do a series of statues articulating the concept "Feeding the Planet, Energy for Life".

== Other activities and roles ==
Ferretti is a member of the Italy-USA Foundation.

As of 2023, he is a vice-president on the board of the Ischia Global Film & Music Festival, an international film festival held on the Italian island of Ischia.

== Filmography ==
- Medea (1969)
- The Decameron (1971)
- Io non vedo, tu non parli, lui non sente (1971)
- The Working Class Goes to Heaven (1971)
- The Canterbury Tales (1972)
- Slap the Monster on Page One (1972)
- Bawdy Tales (1973)
- Somewhere Beyond Love (1974)
- Arabian Nights (1974)
- Till Marriage Do Us Part (1974)
- Salò, or the 120 Days of Sodom (1975)
- Todo modo (1976)
- La presidentessa (1977)
- Il mostro (1977)
- Beach House (1977)
- The Cat (1977)
- Break Up (1978)
- Bye Bye Monkey (1978)
- Orchestra Rehearsal (1978)
- City of Women (1980)
- Il minestrone (1981)
- The Skin (1981)
- Tales of Ordinary Madness (1981)
- That Night in Varennes (1982)
- Beyond the Door (1982)
- And the Ship Sails On (1983)
- Pianoforte (1984)
- Le bon roi Dagobert (1984)
- The Future Is Woman (1984)
- Ginger and Fred (1986)
- The Name of the Rose (1986)
- Il segreto del Sahara (1988) TV miniseries
- The Adventures of Baron Munchausen (1988)
- The Sleazy Uncle (1989)
- The Voice of the Moon (1990)
- Dr. M (1990)
- Hamlet (1990)
- La traviata (1992) TV
- The Age of Innocence (1993)
- Interview with the Vampire (1994)
- Casino (1995)
- Cavalleria rusticana (1996) TV
- Kundun (1997)
- Manon Lescaut (1998) TV
- Meet Joe Black (1998)
- Bringing Out the Dead (1999)
- Titus (1999)
- Un ballo in maschera (2001) TV
- Il trovatore (2002) TV
- Gangs of New York (2002)
- Cold Mountain (2003)
- The Aviator (2004)
- The Fine Art of Love: Mine Ha-Ha (2005)
- The Black Dahlia (2006)
- Sweeney Todd: The Demon Barber of Fleet Street (2007)
- Shutter Island (2010)
- Hugo (2011)
- Cinderella (2015)
- Seventh Son (2015)
- Silence (2016)
- Juliet & Romeo (2025)
