= Anna Melato =

Italian actress, singer, and voice actor

Anna Melato (born 18 May 1952) is an Italian actress, singer and voice actor. She is best known for singing and acting in Lina Wertmüller's Love and Anarchy (1973), where she sang Nino Rota's "Canzone arrabbiata" and "El Tunin".

In the 1970s, Melato performed as a singer at popular music variety shows and festivals, including Canzonissima (1973), Sanremo Music Festival 1974 and Festivalbar (1975). She released two LPs of pop music, Domenica mattina (Dischi Ricordi, 1974) and Ritratto (RCA Italiana, 1977) and played in Sergio Citti's Beach House (1977) and Happy Hobos (1979).

In the 1980s and 1990s Melato played a role in other Italian films, including Pupi Avati's Help Me Dream (1981), Carlo Vanzina's Eccezzziunale... veramente (1982) and Wilma Labate's My Generation (1996). From 1985 onwards, she began to work more frequently in the television field and had roles in TV series such as Mai per amore (2012), A Good Season (2014), La dama velata (2015) and La porta rossa (2nd season, 2019). In 2001 she acted in Mimmo Raimondi's film Without Filter.

Melato is the sister of late actress Mariangela Melato. She currently resides in Rome, Italy.

== Filmography ==
- Love and Anarchy (1973)
- Beach House (Casotto) (1977)
- Due pezzi di pane (1979)
- Il matrimonio di Caterina film TV (1982)
- Eccezzziunale... veramente (1982)
- Dancing Paradise (1982)
- Aiutami a sognare (1982)
- Chi mi aiuta...? (1983)
- Chewingum (1984)
- Caccia al ladro d'autore TV series (1985)
- Una donna a Venezia TV series (1986)
- Il commissario Corso TV series (1987)
- Quelli del casco (1987)
- Fuga senza fine (1987)
- Ma non-per sempre (1991)
- Bidoni (1995)
- Infiltrato (1996)
- La mia generazione (1996)
- Grazie di tutto (1998)
- Fine secolo serie TV (1999)
- Senza filtro (2001)
- Incantesimo TV series (2002)
- Amanti e segreti TV series (2004)
- La stagione dei delitti TV series (2004–2007)
- A Good Season TV series (2015)
- La dama velata TV series (2015)
- La porta rossa - Seconda stagione – TV series (2019)
- Mentre ero via – TV series (2019)

== Discography ==
=== 45 rounds ===
- 1973: Canzone arrabbiata/Antonio Soffiantini detto Tunin (Cinevox)
- 1973: Punto d'incontro/La notte fu (Ricordi)
- 1973: Dormitorio pubblico/Punto d'incontro (Ricordi)
- 1974: Sta piovendo dolcemente (Festival di Sanremo)/Faccia di pietra (Ricordi)
- 1974: Vola/Madame Marilou (Ricordi)
- 1975: Comunque sia/La mia pelle in libertà (Ricordi)
- 1977: Ritratto/Io so come si fa (RCA Italiana)
- 1980: Voglio fare l'ospite/Uan tu tri (Ricordi)
- 1983: Poco e malefficiente/Dove credi di andare (Soedi)
- 1985: Sto da sola/Rudy rap (Cam)

=== 33 rounds ===
- 1974: Domenica mattina (Ricordi)
- 1977: Ritratto (RCA Italiana)
- 1979: L'ingorgo (dalla colonna sonora del film omonimo interpreta Una storia impossible) (Cam)
- 1982: Dancing Paradise (dalla colonna sonora del film omonimo) (Centotrè)
