= Pigsty (film) =

- Theatrical release poster
- Directed by: Pier Paolo Pasolini
- Written by: Pier Paolo Pasolini
- Produced by: Gian Vittorio Baldi; Robert Shaye (american production)
- Starring: Pierre Clémenti; Jean-Pierre Léaud; Alberto Lionello; Ugo Tognazzi
- Cinematography: Tonino Delli Colli; Armando Nannuzzi; Giuseppe Ruzzolini
- Edited by: Nino Baragli
- Music by: Benedetto Ghiglia
- Distributed by: New Line Cinema
- Release date: 31 August 1969 (Italy)
- Running time: 99 minutes
- Countries: Italy; France
- Language: Italian

Pigsty (Italian: Porcile) is a 1969 Italian film written and directed by Pier Paolo Pasolini starring Jean-Pierre Léaud, Marco Ferreri, Ugo Tognazzi, Pierre Clémenti, Alberto Lionello, Franco Citti and Anne Wiazemsky.

The Criterion Collection's website states "Provocateur Pier Paolo Pasolini is at his most incendiary in this double-edged allegory on fascism, consumerism, and resistance. .... these stories of transgression form a scathing commentary on postwar European moral rot and the meaning of rebellion in the face of a corrupt world."

== Plot ==
The film opens with narration contrasting "the Germany of Bonn" with "the Germany of Hitler"; the opening credits then play over images and sounds of a pigsty, accompanied by an instrumental arrangement of the Horst-Wessel-Lied.

The film features two parallel stories.

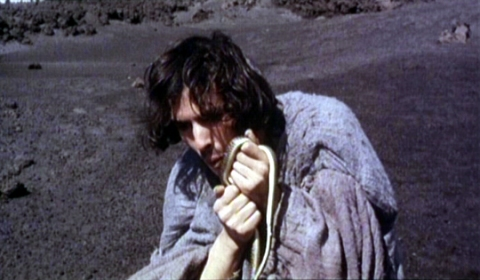
Pierre Clémenti as the cannibal

The first story is set around 1500 on the slopes of Etna in Sicily, and is completely devoid of dialogue until the protagonist's final line. A young man wanders around a volcanic landscape killing and eating insects and small animals. He flees from garrisons of soldiers, fearing that he might be seen and only approaches corpses. Soon, he is no longer satisfied with animal flesh and wants to experience the taste of human flesh; a short time later, seeing the same garrison that he had seen at the beginning of the film, he manages to attract a soldier and kill him. After this first act of cannibalism, other people start joining him on his journey, including some women.

After more carnage, news of the cannibals' raids reach a village. Soon, they are surrounded and captured by the locals. During the capture, Clémenti recites the famous tagline of the film: "I killed my father, I ate human flesh and I quiver with joy." Poles are erected and the cannibals are tied to them, left to be devoured by stray dogs.

The story is about the human capacity of destruction and a rebellion against the social prerequisites implied against it.

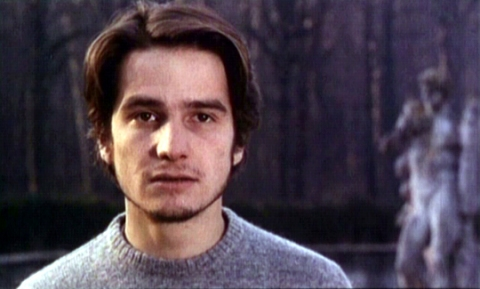
Jean-Pierre Léaud as Julian

The second story is set during 1967, in a villa in Godesberg, Germany, where a young man named Julian leads a flat and confined existence, which causes him to neglect his radically politicised fiancée Ida. His father, industrialist Herr Klotz, tries to convince his son to hurry up with his marriage, but Julian is adamant. Julian also harbours a secret, which is that he secretly sneaks into a pigsty and lies with the pigs whenever he has the chance.

The family situation worsens even more when Julian falls into a state of trance, stretching out on an armchair, remaining indifferent to everything that happens around him. In the meantime, two men arrive at the villa, one of whom, Hans Guenther, introduces Mr. Herdhitze, his rival and old comrade in arms, to Klotz. Klotz is initially tempted to blackmail Herdhitze after hearing about his macabre background from Guenther about some Jewish bodies that Herdhitze allegedly kept to conduct questionable experiments. Herdhitze arrives at Klotz's villa proposing him to join the company. The man refuses, but is then forced to reconsider due to Herdhitze's revelation, informed of Julian's scandalous dealings with pigs.

While all this is happening, Julian recovers and decides once and for all to have a clear and precise discussion with Ida, revealing his ideas about love, even though he doesn't talk to her about his relationships. Afterwards, while Ida leaves the villa to marry someone else and while Klotz and Herdhitze are forming a company, Julian heads to the pigsty, allowing himself to be devoured by pigs. Julian's end is not shown but is instead told in a dialogue between Herdhitze and the gardener of the villa, Maracchione. Since there is nothing left of Julian, as the pigs had eaten his entire body, Herdhitze tells Maracchione to be silent about matter.

The story attempts to provide a link between the Third Reich and Wirtschaftswunder Germany.

Both stories show the consequences that parent's behaviour can have on their children, and the acts of rebellion or attitude of apathy said children can assume.

== Cast ==
- Pierre Clémenti as Young cannibal
- Franco Citti as Second cannibal
- Ninetto Davoli as Maracchione
- Jean-Pierre Léaud as Julian Klotz
- Anne Wiazemsky as Ida
- Alberto Lionello as Signore Klotz
- Margarita Lozano as Madame Klotz
- Ugo Tognazzi as Herdhitze
- Marco Ferreri as Hans Günther

== Credits ==
- Director: Pier Paolo Pasolini
- Written by: Pier Paolo Pasolini
- Produced by: Gian Vittorio Baldi
- Associate producer: Gianni Barcelloni
- Cinematography: Tonino Delli Colli, Armando Nannuzzi, Giuseppe Ruzzolini
- Edited by: Nino Baragli
- Costume design: Danilo Donati
- Music: Benedetto Ghiglia
- Sound: Alberto Salvatori

== Reception ==
On review aggregator website Rotten Tomatoes, the film has a rating of 60% based on 10 critics, with an average rating of 5.7/10.

== Home video ==
The film was released by the Criterion Collection in a 9-BD box of Pasolini 101, in celebration of Pasolini's 101st birthday.
