= Ostia (film) =

- Directed by: Sergio Citti
- Written by: Pier Paolo Pasolini; Sergio Citti
- Produced by: Pier Paolo Pasolini
- Starring: Franco Citti, Laurent Terzieff, Ninetto Davoli
- Cinematography: Mario Mancini
- Edited by: Nino Baragli; Carlo Reali
- Music by: Francesco De Masi
- Release date: March 11, 1970
- Running time: 103 min
- Country: Italy
- Language: Italian

Ostia is a 1970 Italian drama film. It is the directorial debut of Sergio Citti.

== Plot summary ==
In the poor and infamous suburb of Ostia, two brothers live in a small run-down apartment. One day, they find a girl, who ran away from home to escape her father's sexual violences, and bond out of solidarity. When both brothers fall in love with her, they have several fights, at the end of which only one will survive.

== Cast ==
- Laurent Terzieff: Bandiera
- Franco Citti: Rabbino
- Anita Sanders: Monica
- Ninetto Davoli: Fiorino
- Lamberto Maggiorani: Monica' father
- Celestino Compagnoni: Bandiera and Rabbino's father
