= Happy Hobos =

- Directed by: Sergio Citti
- Written by: Sergio Citti
- Cinematography: Giuseppe Ruzzolini
- Edited by: Nino Baragli
- Music by: Alessandro Alessandroni
- Release date: 1979
- Country: Italy
- Language: Italian

Due pezzi di pane, internationally released as Happy Hobos, is a 1979 Italian comedy film directed by Sergio Citti.

== Cast ==
- Vittorio Gassman: Pippo Mifà
- Philippe Noiret: Peppe Dorè
- Gigi Proietti: Albergatore
- Paolo Volponi: Judge
- Anna Melato: Lucia
