= The Voice of the Moon =

- Italian theatrical release poster
- Directed by: Federico Fellini
- Screenplay by: Federico Fellini; Tullio Pinelli; Ermanno Cavazzoni
- Based on: Il poema dei lunatici by Ermano Cavazzoni
- Produced by: Mario and Vittorio Cecchi Gori
- Starring: Roberto Benigni; Paolo Villaggio; Nadia Ottaviani
- Cinematography: Tonino Delli Colli
- Edited by: Nino Baragli
- Music by: Nicola Piovani
- Distributed by: Penta
- Release date: 31 January 1990
- Running time: 120 minutes
- Country: Italy
- Language: Italian
- Box office: $5.1 million (Italy)

The Voice of the Moon (Italian: La voce della luna) is a 1990 Italian dramatic comedy film directed and written by Federico Fellini and starring Roberto Benigni, Paolo Villaggio, and Nadia Ottaviani. Based on the novel Il poema dei lunatici by Ermanno Cavazzoni, and revisiting themes Fellini first explored in La strada (1954), the film is about a fake inspector of wells and a former prefect who wander through the Emilia-Romagna countryside of Fellini's childhood and discover a dystopia of television commercials, fascism, beauty pageants, rock music, Catholicism, and pagan ritual.

The film received David di Donatello Awards for Best Actor, Best Editing, and Best Production Design, and nominations for Best Director, Best Film, Best Cinematography, Best Music, and Best Producer. The Voice of the Moon was Fellini's last film before his death in 1993.

== Plot ==
With a nod to the lunar-obsessed lyrics of Italian poet Giacomo Leopardi, the acerbic tale focuses on the capture of the moon by the Micheluzzi brothers while Ivo, newly released from a mental hospital, tries to seduce Aldina Ferruzzi with whom he's infatuated. Although she wants nothing to do with him, Ivo equates her blond beauty with the moon, the origin of his madness and frustration. During the attempts to woo her, he meets various madcap characters including an oboist who sleeps in the local cemetery, a man whose hobby is meditating on rooftops, and Gonnella, the ex-prefect fired for his rising paranoia. Gonnella makes Ivo his lieutenant and together they investigate the "wild conspiracies" going on around them.

The oddball pair attends a farcical beauty pageant where Aldina is crowned "Miss Flour of 1989" and ends up lost in the farmlands among graceful African women chanting in the moonlight. Inside an abandoned warehouse, they discover an Inferno-like disco of fashion victims dancing and bopping deliriously to Michael Jackson's "The Way You Make Me Feel". Ivo realises that Aldina's shoe, obtained surreptitiously, fits every Cinderella who tries it on. To the dancers' stupefaction, Gonnella orchestrates a waltz but is thrown out after smashing the disc jockey's cache of records.

Meanwhile, the three demented Micheluzzi brothers have caught the moon using gigantic farming equipment and roped it down in a stable. What ought to be a sacred event becomes a squandered opportunity as priests and politicians turn it into a conference for official propaganda voiced to the assembled public. The conference rapidly degenerates into violence by a madman with a pistol screaming, "What am I doing here? Why was I put here in the first place?", leaving Ivo Salvini with the film's last words: "If we all quieted down a little, maybe we'd understand something."

== Cast ==
- Roberto Benigni as Ivo Salvini
- Paolo Villaggio as Gonnella
- Nadia Ottaviani as Aldina
- Marisa Tomasi as Marisa
- Angelo Orlando as Nestore
- Susy Blady as Susy
- Dario Ghirardi as Journalist
- Dominique Chevalier as 1st Micheluzzi Brother
- Nigel Harris as 2nd Micheluzzi Brother
- Daniela Airoldi
- Stefano Antonucci
- Ferruccio Brembilla
- Stefano Cedrati
- Sim

== Themes ==
In Ermanno Cavazzoni's 1987 novel, Il poema dei lunatici (The Lunatics' Poem) on which the film is loosely based, Fellini recognized an abandoned project about filming the natural world: "the soil, the seasons, sun and rain, day and night. He likes the notion that at night the water in the well is awakened by the moon and starts uttering faint messages" to those prepared to listen. Unfortunately, few are permitted - let alone prepared - to listen in the infernal uproar of a postmodern world where blaring television commercials and beeping satellites drown out poetry, silence, and the voice of the moon.

The consumer society critiqued in the Rome of La Dolce Vita has moved to the suburbs where incommunicability, selfishness, voyeurism, and spiritual poverty characterise the chaos of mass media existence. In his twilight years (three years before he died of a heart attack at the age of 73), Fellini mounts an energetic assault on media moguls like Silvio Berlusconi and the pandemonium of contemporary society by suggesting the escape into silence as a means to heal the psyche, the source of all true wisdom.

== Production ==
After writing a short treatment in two weeks with Tullio Pinelli, Fellini began scouting locations on the Po in September 1988 where he visited Reggiòlo, the hometown of the gifted Italian caricaturist Nino Za, his adolescent idol; the memories evoked reinforced his idea of returning to the provincial atmosphere of his early films. Although Fellini was still unsure about what he wanted to film, producers Mario and Vittorio Cecchi Gori agreed to finance his project to the tune of fifteen billion lire. Pietro Notarianni, the production manager, and Danilo Donati, Oscar-winning Set and Costume Designer, engaged in a heated dispute over costs. Donati quit and was replaced by Dante Ferretti.

To help organise his ideas, Fellini decided to build a town outside Rome on the via Pontina near Dinocittà, the former film studio of producer Dino De Laurentiis. With Dante Ferretti, he constructed a church, a piazza, apartment blocks, shops, and a hairdresser's boutique, all designed in a parody of styles. Although no genuine script was ever completed, Fellini managed to conceive entire scenes each day by observing his actors improvising on the set, rather like puppets in a doll's house.

Principal photography started on 22 February 1989. According to biographer Tullio Kezich, the film "will be remembered as one of the most serenely uninhibited of Fellini's sets... At the final dinner in mid-June, the last time that the troupe will convene, Benigni outdoes himself and recites a wonderful poem in ottava rima, recounting everything that had happened and been felt over the last months".

== Reception ==
Aided by the immense popularity in Italy of comic actors Benigni and Villaggio, the film was one of the highest-grossing Italian films of the year with a gross of $5.1 million. It received enthusiastic reviews from Alberto Moravia, Tullio Kezich, and Aldo Tassone along with a few outright pans. Although it did poor business in France, it was acclaimed in Le Monde and Positif, and was featured on the cover of Les Cahiers du Cinéma which saw it as a winning diatribe on the excesses of Guy Debord's "society of spectacle". At the 1990 Ciak d'oro awards, the film won Best Cinematography.

The film screened out of competition at the 1990 Cannes Film Festival, where it was panned or ignored by the majority of North American critics. One critic boasted, "Absolutely ravishing. I've never been so bored in my life".
