= Identikit (disambiguation) =

Identikit is a technology for creating facial composites. The word has become a synecdoche for facial composites and for things that lack individuality.

Identikit may also refer to:

- Identikit, alternate title of the 1974 Italian drama film The Driver's Seat
- "Identikit", a 2016 song by Radiohead from the album A Moon Shaped Pool
