= Elide Melli =

Italian actress (born 1952)

- Born: 29 November 1952 (age 73); Mondavio, Italy
- Occupation: Actress
- Years active: 1979–present

Elide Melli (born 29 November 1952) is an Italian actress. She appeared in more than ten films since 1979.

== Selected filmography ==
Year	Title	Role	Notes
1986	Momo	Frau Daria	
1990	Quiet Days in Clichy		
1995	The Seventh Chamber	Rosa	
1996	We Free Kings	Attore	
2000	Vipera	Vipera	
