= Danilo Donati =

Italian costume and production designer (1926–2001)

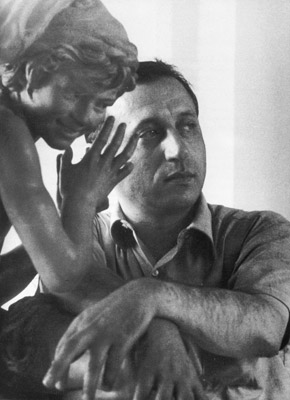
- Born: 6 April 1926; Luzzara, Kingdom of Italy
- Died: 1 December 2001 (aged 75); Rome, Italy
- Occupations: Costume designer; production designer
- Years active: 1959–2001

Danilo Donati (6 April 1926 – 1 December 2001) was an Italian costume designer and production designer. He has received numerous accolades, including two Academy Awards, three BAFTA Awards, and eight David di Donatellos.

Donati frequently collaborated with directors Federico Fellini, Pier Paolo Pasolini, and Franco Zeffirelli. He has been nominated for the Academy Award for Best Costume Design five times, winning twice for Romeo and Juliet (1968) and Fellini's Casanova (1976).

== Filmography ==
=== Film ===
List of Danilo Donati film credits
Year	Title	Director	Credited as		Notes
Year	Title	Director	Costume Designer	Production Designer	Notes
1959	The Great War	Mario Monicelli	Yes	No	with Piero Gherardi
1960	Adua and Her Friends	Antonio Pietrangeli	Yes	No	
1961	Vanina Vanini	Roberto Rossellini	Yes	No	
1963	Ro.Go.Pa.G.	Jean-Luc Godard; Ugo Gregoretti; Pier Paolo Pasolini; Roberto Rossellini	Yes	No	
1964	The Gospel According to St. Matthew	Pier Paolo Pasolini	Yes	No	
1965	The Mandrake	Alberto Lattuada	Yes	No	
1966	Madamigella di Maupin	Mauro Bolognini	Yes	No	
1966	The Hawks and the Sparrows	Pier Paolo Pasolini	Yes	No	
1967	Oedipus Rex	Pier Paolo Pasolini	Yes	No	
1967	The Taming of the Shrew	Franco Zeffirelli	Yes	No	
1968	Romeo and Juliet	Franco Zeffirelli	Yes	No	
1969	Pigsty	Pier Paolo Pasolini	Yes	No	
1969	Fellini Satyricon	Federico Fellini	Yes	No	
1971	The Decameron	Pier Paolo Pasolini	Yes	No	
1972	Brother Sun, Sister Moon	Franco Zeffirelli	Yes	No	
1972	Roma	Federico Fellini	Yes	Yes	
1972	The Canterbury Tales	Pier Paolo Pasolini	Yes	No	
1973	Amarcord	Federico Fellini	Yes	Yes	
1974	Arabian Nights	Pier Paolo Pasolini	Yes	No	
1975	Salò, or the 120 Days of Sodom	Pier Paolo Pasolini	Yes	No	
1976	Fellini's Casanova	Federico Fellini	Yes	No	Also art director
1977	Black Journal	Mauro Bolognini	Yes	Yes	
1979	Hurricane	Jan Troell	Yes	Yes	
1979	Caligula	Tinto Brass	No	No	Art director and uncredited costume designer
1980	Flash Gordon	Mike Hodges	Yes	Yes	
1985	Red Sonja	Richard Fleischer	Yes	Yes	
1986	Ginger and Fred	Federico Fellini	Yes	No	
1986	Momo	Johannes Schaaf	Yes	Yes	
1987	Intervista	Federico Fellini	Yes	Yes	
1989	Francesco	Liliana Cavani	Yes	Yes	
1994	The Monster	Roberto Benigni	Yes	No	
1997	Marianna Ucrìa	Roberto Faenza	Yes	Yes	
1997	Life Is Beautiful	Roberto Benigni	Yes	Yes	
2002	Pinocchio	Roberto Benigni	Yes	Yes	Posthumous release

=== Television ===
List of Danilo Donati television credits
Year	Title	Contribution		Notes
Year	Title	Costume Designer	Production Designer	Notes
1970	The Clowns	Yes	No	Television film Also released in a theatrical version
1997	Nostromo	Yes	No	4 episodes

== Awards and nominations ==
Major associations

Academy Awards

Year	Category	Nominated work	Result	Ref.
1967	Best Costume Design – Black and White	The Gospel According to St. Matthew	Nominated	
1967	Best Costume Design – Black and White	Mandragola	Nominated	
1968	Best Costume Design	The Taming of the Shrew	Nominated	
1969	Best Costume Design	Romeo and Juliet	Won	
1977	Best Costume Design	Fellini's Casanova	Won	

BAFTA Awards

Year	Category	Nominated work	Result	Ref.
British Academy Film Awards
1969	Best Costume Design	Romeo and Juliet	Won	
1974	Best Costume Design	Brother Sun, Sister Moon	Nominated	
1974	Best Production Design	Roma	Nominated	
1978	Best Costume Design	Fellini's Casanova	Won	
1978	Best Production Design	Fellini's Casanova	Won	
1981	Best Costume Design	Flash Gordon	Nominated	
1981	Best Production Design	Flash Gordon	Nominated	

Miscellaneous awards

List of Danilo Donati other awards and nominations
Award	Year (Note: Indicates the year of ceremony. Each year is linked to the article about the awards held that year, wherever possible.)	Category	Title	Result
Ciak d'oro	1986	Best Costume Design	Ginger and Fred	Won
Ciak d'oro	1989	Best Costume Design	Francesco	Nominated
Ciak d'oro	1989	Best Production Design	Francesco	Won
Ciak d'oro	1997	Best Production Design	Marianna Ucrìa	Nominated
Ciak d'oro	1998	Best Costume Design	Life Is Beautiful	Nominated
Ciak d'oro	1998	Best Production Design	Life Is Beautiful	Nominated
Ciak d'oro	2003	Best Costume Design	Pinocchio	Won
Ciak d'oro	2003	Best Production Design	Pinocchio	Nominated
David di Donatello Awards	1986	Best Costumes	Ginger and Fred	Won
David di Donatello Awards	1988	Best Production Design	Intervista	Nominated
David di Donatello Awards	1989	Best Costumes	Francesco	Nominated
David di Donatello Awards	1989	Best Production Design	Francesco	Won
David di Donatello Awards	1997	Best Costumes	Marianna Ucrìa	Won
David di Donatello Awards	1997	Best Production Design	Marianna Ucrìa	Won
David di Donatello Awards	1998	Best Costumes	Life Is Beautiful	Won
David di Donatello Awards	1998	Best Production Design	Life Is Beautiful	Won
David di Donatello Awards	2003	Best Costumes	Pinocchio	Won
David di Donatello Awards	2003	Best Production Design	Pinocchio	Won
Nastro d'Argento Awards	1960	Best Costume Design	The Great War	Nominated
Nastro d'Argento Awards	1961	Best Costume Design	Adua and Her Friends	Nominated
Nastro d'Argento Awards	1965	Best Costume Design	The Gospel According to St. Matthew	Won
Nastro d'Argento Awards	1967	Best Costume Design	Madamigella di Maupin	Nominated
Nastro d'Argento Awards	1968	Best Costume Design	The Taming of the Shrew	Won
Nastro d'Argento Awards	1968	Best Costume Design	Oedipus Rex	Nominated
Nastro d'Argento Awards	1969	Best Costume Design	Romeo and Juliet	Won
Nastro d'Argento Awards	1970	Best Costume Design	Fellini Satyricon	Won
Nastro d'Argento Awards	1970	Best Production Design	Fellini Satyricon	Won
Nastro d'Argento Awards	1971	Best Costume Design	I clowns	Won
Nastro d'Argento Awards	1972	Best Production Design	Between Miracles	Nominated
Nastro d'Argento Awards	1973	Best Costume Design	Roma	Won
Nastro d'Argento Awards	1973	Best Production Design	Roma	Won
Nastro d'Argento Awards	1974	Best Costume Design	Amarcord	Nominated
Nastro d'Argento Awards	1975	Best Costume Design	Arabian Nights	Nominated
Nastro d'Argento Awards	1977	Best Costume Design	Fellini's Casanova	Won
Nastro d'Argento Awards	1977	Best Production Design	Fellini's Casanova	Won
Nastro d'Argento Awards	1986	Best Costume Design	Ginger and Fred	Won
Nastro d'Argento Awards	1989	Best Production Design	Francesco	Won
Nastro d'Argento Awards	1997	Best Costume Design	We Free Kings	Nominated
Nastro d'Argento Awards	1998	Best Costume Design	Marianna Ucrìa	Won
Nastro d'Argento Awards	1998	Best Production Design	Marianna Ucrìa	Won
Saturn Awards	1981	Best Costume Design	Flash Gordon	Nominated
