= Ermanno Cavazzoni =

Italian author and translator

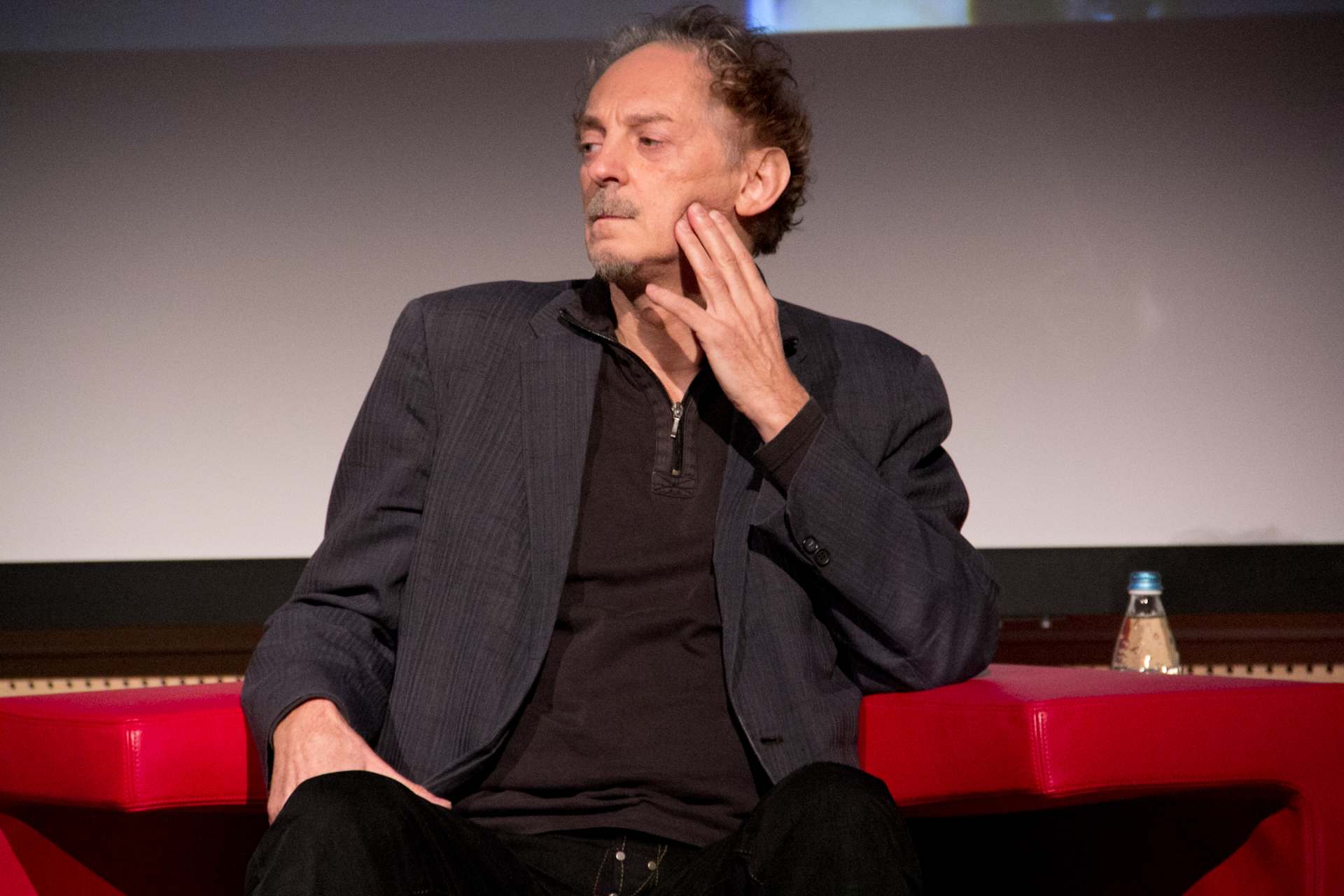
Image of Ermanno Cavazzoni

Ermanno Cavazzoni (born 5 June 1947) is an Italian writer and screenwriter.

== Biography ==
Ermanno Cavazzoni was born in Reggio Emilia in 1947. In 1988, Cavazzoni won the Premio Bergamo for Il poema dei lunatici (The Voice of the Moon), and subsequently collaborated with Federico Fellini on his last film The Voice of the Moon, contributing to the screenplay adaptation of the novel. He is a professor at the University of Bologna and a member of OpLePo (Opificio di Letteratura Potenziale). He was co-director of the magazine Il semplice (Feltrinelli, 1995-96) and Il Caffè illustrato (since 2001). In 2007, together with some friends (Gianni Celati, Ugo Cornia and Jean Talon), he created the fiction series "Compagnia Extra" for the Quodlibet publishing house.

== Selected bibliography ==
- Il poema dei lunatici (Bollati Boringhieri, 1987). The Voice of the Moon, trans. Ed Emery (Serpent's Tail, 1990).
- Le tentazioni di Girolamo (Bollati Boringhieri, 1991). The Nocturnal Library, trans. Allan Cameron (Vagabond Voices, 2010).
- Vite brevi di idioti (Feltrinelli, 1994). Brief Lives of Idiots, trans. Jamie Richards (Wakefield Press, 2020).
- Cirenaica (Einaudi, 1999)
- Morti fortunati (OpLePo, 2001)
- Gli scrittori inutili (Feltrinelli, 2002). Useless Writers, trans. Jamie Richards (Wakefield Press, forthcoming).
- La galassia dei dementi (2018)

== Filmography ==
=== Screenwriter ===
- La voce della Luna, directed by Federico Fellini (1990)
- La vita come viaggio aziendale, directed by Paolo Muran (2006)
- Il mare d'inverno, directed by Ermanno Cavazzoni, an episode of Formato ridotto (2012)

=== Director ===
- Il mare d'inverno, an episode of Formato ridotto (2012)
- Vacanze al mare (2013)

== Awards and honors ==
- 1988: Premio Bergamo for Il poema dei lunatici
- 2000: Finalist for the Premio Bergamo for Cirenaica
- 2018: Premio Campiello for La galassia dei dementi
