= Storia de fratelli e de cortelli =

- Directed by: Mario Amendola
- Written by: Bruno Corbucci; Mario Amendola; Sergio Corbucci
- Cinematography: Fausto Zuccoli
- Music by: Franco Micalizzi
- Release date: 1973
- Running time: 100 minutes
- Country: Italy
- Language: Italian

Storia de fratelli e de cortelli (A story of brothers and knives) is a 1973 Italian comedy-drama film written and directed by Mario Amendola.

== Plot ==
Gigi and Nino Romagnoli are two brothers living in Rome at the beginning of the 20th century. Gigi, young and handsome, engaged to Rosetta, falls in love with Mara, a young woman who is accustomed to luxury and refinement. To satisfy the woman's desire, Gigi start stealing and going into all serious.

== Cast ==
- Maurizio Arena: Nino Romagnoli
- Guido Mannari: Gigi Romagnoli
- Tina Aumont: Mara
- Ninetto Davoli: Riccetto
- Franco Citti: Artemio
- Anna Maria Pescatori: Armida Romagnoli
- Vittorio De Sica: Marshal Cenciarelli
- Sandra Cardini: Tecla
- Elena Veronese: Rosetta
- Toni Ucci: Silvio
