= Ninetto Davoli =

Italian actor (born 1948)

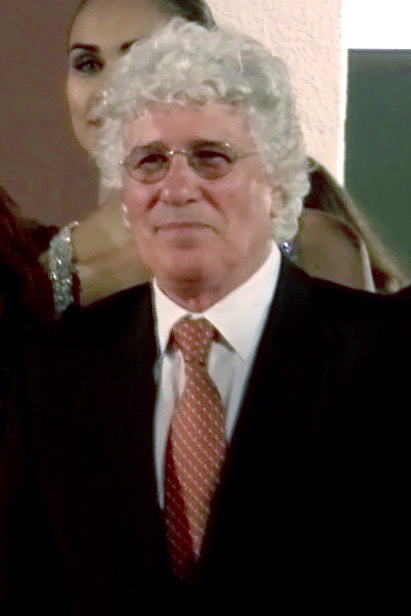
- Davoli in 2014 in Venice
- Born: Giovanni Davoli; 11 October 1948 (age 78); San Pietro a Maida, Calabria, Italy
- Occupation: Actor
- Years active: 1964–present
- Height: 1.74 m (5 ft 9 in)

Giovanni "Ninetto" Davoli (born 11 October 1948) is an Italian actor who appeared in several of Pier Paolo Pasolini's films.

== Biography ==
Davoli was born in San Pietro a Maida, in the region of Calabria. He was discovered by poet, novelist and film director Pier Paolo Pasolini, then 41, who had begun a relationship with Davoli, then a 15-year-old boy, in 1963. Pasolini considered him to be "the great love of his life", and he later cast him in his 1966 film Uccellacci e uccellini (literally Bad Birds and Little Birds but translated in English as The Hawks and the Sparrows), co-starred with celebrated comic Totò. Pasolini became the youth's mentor and friend. "Even though their sexual relations lasted only a few years, Ninetto continued to live with Pasolini and was his constant companion, as well as appearing in six more of his films."

First cast in a non-speaking role in the film Il vangelo secondo Matteo (The Gospel According to St. Matthew, 1964), Davoli played mostly comical-naïve roles in several more of Pasolini's films, the last of which was Il fiore delle Mille e una Notte (A Thousand and One Nights/Arabian Nights, 1974).

The so-called "Trilogy of Life" was made at a harsh junction in the lives of Davoli and Pasolini. It was during the filming of The Canterbury Tales that Davoli left Pasolini to marry a woman. Behind the scenes, this ruined Pasolini's mood and he began composing nihilistic and angry poetry. For his next film, Arabian Nights, Pasolini did with Davoli what he had never done in a previous film: he showed Davoli's naked genitalia on screen. It is in this film that Davoli's character Aziz is a very selfish and unfeeling man whose rejection of a woman causes her death and which results in his own castration on screen. Pasolini's own hurt feelings are very evident here in what is for the most part a lighthearted fantasy film.

After Pasolini's death in 1975, Davoli turned increasingly to television productions.

In May 2015, Davoli was announced as recipient of a special Nastro d'Argento Career Award.

== Selected filmography ==
=== Film ===
- The Gospel According to St. Matthew (1964, Pasolini) - Pastore con bambino (uncredited)
- The Hawks and the Sparrows (1966, Pasolini) - Innocenti Ninetto / Brother Ninetto
- The Witches (1967, Pasolini) - Baciu Miao (segment "La terra vista dalla luna")
- Requiescant (1967) - El Niño
- Oedipus Rex (1967, Pasolini) - Angelo
- Caprice Italian Style (1968, Pasolini) - Othello (segment "Che cosa sono le nuvole?")
- Teorema (1968, Pasolini) - Angelino - the Messenger
- Partner (1968) - Student
- Love and Anger (1969, Pasolini) - Riccetto (segment "La sequenza del fiore di carta")
- Porcile (Pigsty, 1969, Pasolini) - Maracchione
- Ostia (1970) - Fiorino
- The Decameron (1971, Pasolini) - Andreuccio of Perugia
- Er Più – storia d'amore e di coltello (1971) - Antonio Cerino, aka 'Totarello'
- Shadows Unseen (1972) - Giorgio the Pusher
- The Canterbury Tales (1972, Pasolini) - Perkin
- S.P.Q.R. (1972)
- Storia di fifa e di coltello - er seguito del più (1972) - 'Totarello' Meniconi
- Il maschio ruspante (1972) - Walter
- Anche se volessi lavorare, che faccio? (1972) - Riccetto
- Maria Rosa la guardona (1973) - Romolo
- La Tosca (1973) - Ussano Nero
- Storia de fratelli e de cortelli (1973) - Riccetto
- Bawdy Tales (1973) - Bernardino
- The Lady Has Been Raped (1973) - Palla
- Unbelievable Adventures of Italians in Russia (1974) - Giuseppe
- Pasqualino Cammarata, Frigate Captain (1974) - Otello Meniconi
- Arabian Nights (1974, Pasolini) - Aziz
- Appassionata (1974) - Butcher's Boy
- Don't Hurt Me, My Love (1974) - Giovanni 'Ninetto' Procacci
- Il lumacone (1974) - Ginetto
- Blonde in Black Leather (1975) - Il saltimbanco / l'angelo / il diavolo
- Reflections in Black (1975) - Sandro Lucetti
- Frankenstein all'italiana (1975) - Igor
- And Agnes Chose to Die (1976) - La disperata
- Sex with a Smile II (1976) - Pietro, Thief (Segment "L'armadio Di Troia")
- Amore all'arrabbiata (1976) - Ninetto De Terenzi
- Death Hunt (1977) - Mario
- Casotto (1977) - Il fotografo
- Malabestia (1978) - Filippo Diotallevi
- How to Seduce Your Teacher (1979) - Arturo
- Maschio.. femmina... fiore... frutto (1979) - Donato - un militare
- Good News (1979) - Fattorino
- Il cappotto di Astrakan (1980)
- Il minestrone (1981) - Giovanni
- The Tyrant's Heart (1981) - Filippo
- Count Tacchia (1982) - Ninetto
- Occhei, occhei (1983) - Prete
- Mary Ward (1985) - Bettler am Brunnen
- Momo (1986) - Nino
- A proposito di Roma (1987)
- Animali metropolitani (1987) - Spartaco Scorcelletti
- Le rose blu (1996)
- La ragazza del metrò (1989) - Donato
- Le rose blu (1989) - La guardia carceraria
- L'anno prossimo vado a letto alle dieci (1995) - Il Tenente
- We Free Kings (1996) - Amico di Giuseppe
- Cinématon #1824 (1997)
- Una vita non violenta (1999) - Franco
- One Out of Two (2006) - Giovanni
- Concrete Romance (2007) - Pompo
- Scontro di civiltà per un ascensore a Piazza Vittorio (2010) - Il Tassinaro
- All at Sea (2011) - Alfredo
- Fiabeschi torna a casa (2013)
- Without Pity (2014) - Santili
- Pasolini (2014) - Epifanio
- Mio papà (2014) - Orso
- Uno anzi due (2015) - Nando Scaratti
- Natale a Londra – Dio salvi la regina (2016) - Er Duca
- Agony (2020) (formerly titled The Executrix) - Rudolfo
- Ritorno al crimine (2021)

=== Television ===
- Le avventure di Calandrino e Buffalmaco (1975, TV Mini-Series)
- Addavenì quel giorno e quella notte (1979, TV Mini-Series) - Er Samurai
- Sogni e bisogni (1985, TV Mini-Series) - Er Caramella
- La romana (1988, TV Mini-Series)
- L'altro enigma (1988, TV Movie) - Il barbone
- Il vigile urbano (1989)
- L'avvocato porta (1997) - Remondino
- La banda (2000, TV Movie)
- Vite a prendere (2004, TV Movie) - Enrico Feroci

== Sources ==
- Siciliano, Enzo (1982). Pasolini: A Biography. New York: Random House. p. 167.
