= Beach House (1977 film) =

1977 film

- Film poster
- Directed by: Sergio Citti
- Written by: Vincenzo Cerami; Sergio Citti
- Produced by: Mauro Berardi; Gianfranco Piccioli
- Starring: Jodie Foster; Gigi Proietti; Paolo Stoppa; Michele Placido; Ugo Tognazzi
- Cinematography: Tonino Delli Colli
- Edited by: Nino Baragli
- Music by: Gianni Mazza
- Release date: 28 October 1977
- Running time: 106 minutes
- Country: Italy
- Language: Italian

Beach House (Italian: Casotto) is a 1977 Italian comedy film directed by Sergio Citti. It was shown as part of a retrospective on Italian comedy at the 67th Venice International Film Festival.

== Plot ==
In a warm August's Sunday, a spacious beach house on Ostia's free beach is used in turn by many characters. A volleyball female team led by a martial coach; a lonely English priest with two penises and two grunty friends searching for girls; two sisters who want to seduce an austere insurance official; two old lovers who want to enjoy their first love meeting; two physically trained soldiers and an elderly couple with a young pregnant granddaughter, Teresina, trying to impute the paternity to a simple minded cousin.

Surrounded by various people, all of which are integral and conscientious part of it, the protagonists try to solve their problems or achieve their goals, thinking to turn reality to their own personal vision of things. Away from everyday life, in that holiday bracket there is time to study and make imaginative moves and countermoves, but they will not be able to change their outcomes. At the end of the day a violent and sudden rain will force everyone to a hurried return to the city.

== Cast ==
- Gigi Proietti as Gigi
- Michele Placido as Vincenzino
- Paolo Stoppa as the grandfather
- Flora Carabella as the grandmother
- Jodie Foster as pregnant granddaughter
- Mariangela Melato as Giulia
- Ugo Tognazzi as Alfredo Cerquetti
- Franco Citti as Nando
- Catherine Deneuve as the woman in the dream
- Ninetto Davoli as the voyeur
- Carlo Croccolo as Carlo
- Anna Melato as Bice
- Kathy Marchand as Ketty
- Massimo Bonetti as the soldier

== Production ==
During an outdoor scene on the bank of a stream near Viterbo, in which some actresses (including Ely Galleani and Ulla Johannsen) were completely naked, a crowd of onlookers had gathered causing a traffic jam, so much so that soon after the police had to intervene which led the actresses to the police station, only to be released shortly after.
