= Requiescant =

1967 film

- Italian film poster
- Directed by: Carlo Lizzani
- Screenplay by: Adriano Bolzoni; Armando Crispino; Lucio Battistrada; Carlo Lizzani (uncredited); Pier Paolo Pasolini(uncredited)
- Story by: Renato Izzo; Franco Bucceri
- Produced by: Carlo Lizzani
- Starring: Lou Castel; Mark Damon; Pier Paolo Pasolini; Barbara Frey; Rossana Krisman; Mirella Maravidi; Franco Citti; Nino Davoli
- Cinematography: Sandro Mancori
- Edited by: Franco Fraticelli
- Music by: Riz Ortolani
- Production companies: Castoro Film; Mancori–Chretien; Istituto Luce; Tefi Film Produzione
- Distributed by: Consorzio Italiano Distributori Indipendenti Film (CIDIF)
- Release date: 10 March 1967
- Running time: 107 minutes
- Countries: Italy; West Germany
- Language: Italian

Requiescant (often translated as Kill and Pray) is a 1967 Spaghetti Western film directed by Carlo Lizzani and starring Lou Castel, Mark Damon, Barbara Frey and Pier Paolo Pasolini, in one of his few acting roles.

== Plot ==
At Fort Hernandez near San Antonio, a group of Mexican villagers are betrayed and murdered by Confederate soldiers under the command of the aristocrat Ferguson. A little boy survives and runs into the desert, where he is rescued by Jeremy, a priest, who is there with his small family. The priest raises him as he was his own son. Although heavily religious, the boy also proves to be an excellent gunslinger. Growing up, he gets along particularly well with his stepsister Princy, who one day rebels against her family and joins a traveling troupe.

Setting out to find her, every time he kills an enemy he dismisses him by pronouncing the Latin phrase: "Requiescant!" ("May they rest in peace"), which earns him his nickname. When he comes to San Antonio, he finds that the city belongs to former officer Ferguson. In the saloon he finds Princy working as a prostitute and Ferguson's subordinate Dean Light as her pimp. Ferguson refuses to let Princy walk away with Requiescant. When Requiescant learns of his true identity, he supports the priest Don Juan (played by renowned writer, poet and film director Pier Paolo Pasolini) in his uprising against Ferguson. After a clash, Requiescant kills Ferguson and frees the townspeople from tyranny.

== Cast ==
- Lou Castel: "Requiescant"
- Mark Damon: George Bellow Ferguson
- Pier Paolo Pasolini: Father Juan
- Barbara Frey: Princy
- Rossana Martini (as Rossana Krisman): Lope
- Mirella Maravidi: Edith Ferguson
- Franco Citti: Burt
- Carlo Palmucci: Dean Light
- Ferruccio Viotti: Father Jeremy
- Ninetto Davoli (as Nino Davoli): El Niño
- Lorenza Guerrieri: Marta
- Luisa Baratto (as Liz Barrett): Pilar
- Nino Musco: old mute
- Anne Carrer: Lavinia
- Vittorio Duse: "El Doblado"
- Massimo Sarchielli: Leonardo Marquez
- Pier Annibale Danovi: Felipe

== Reception and critiques ==
In Italy the film grossed almost half a billion Lire. Journalist Ermanno Comuzio praised it, saying: "The film is halfway between the traditional western style and the new cinema - the usual motifs mix with themes of a democratic movement. These two dimensions are optimally coordinated here."

Ulrich P. Bruckner highlights the political dimension of the film: "Mark Damon, normally the hero, goes against his image and plays the vampire-like villain Ferguson, with pale make-up and dressed entirely in black, who is a perfect contrast to Pasolini's Don Juan. Both believe only in their own truth; the revolutionary underdog Don Juan, who was forced to join the revolution and fight against the oppressors, and on the other side the aristocrat Ferguson, who cannot accept the fact that there can be equality between the ruling and the ruled."

The German Lexicon of international film described Requiescant as a "realistic western (with Pasolini in the role of a priest) about pre-revolution Mexico, without sufficient psychological foundation and with a certain dose of brutality".

== Releases ==
Wild East Productions released a limited edition region 0 NTSC DVD on 1 November 2004, preserving the film's original widescreen aspect ratio. The DVD has the English title Kill and Pray on the box art but the title on the print used for the DVD transfer is the original Italian Requiescant title. The 2004 DVD is currently out of print, but the film was re-released under the title Kill and Pray in another limited edition R0 NTSC DVD in 2011 alongside Dead Men Don't Count, also starring Mark Damon.
