= A Good Season =

Italian family drama television miniseries

- Italian: Una buona stagione
- Genre: Family drama
- Written by: Valerio D'Annunzio; Massimo Torre; Stefano Voltaggio; Stefania Bertola
- Directed by: Gianni Lepre
- Starring: Ricardo Dal Moro; Luisana Lopilato; Ottavia Piccolo; Jean Sorel
- Country of origin: Italy
- Original language: Italian
- No. of episodes: 6

Original release
- Network: Rai 1
- Release: 1 April – 6 May 2014

A Good Season (Italian: Una buona stagione) is a 2014 Italian family drama television miniseries. It aired on Rai 1 from 1 April to 6 May 2014.

== Plot ==
The series follows the Masci-Santangelo family, a family of esteemed winemakers from Trentino-Alto Adige.

== Cast ==
- Ricardo Dal Moro as Andrea Masci
- Luisana Lopilato as Silvia Ferrari
- Luisa Ranieri as Bianca Guerrini
- Ottavia Piccolo as Emma Santangelo
- Jean Sorel as Michele Masci
- Ivano Marescotti as Neri Ferrari
- Francesca Valtorta as Marianne von Brurer
- Marina Giulia Cavalli as Olga von Brurer
- Alessandro Bertolucci as Iacopo Masci
- Anna Melato as Elisabetta Carli
- Michela Samantha Capitoni as Michela Ferrin
- Luca Calvani as Guido Vannini
- Ugo Dighero as Franz
- Gabriele Caprio as Paolo Masci
- Ludovica Gargari as Lavinia Masci
- Brando Pacitto as Lorenzo Picchio Lana
- Emily Shaquri as Isabella Masci
- Rodolfo Bigotti as Erich Broch
- Marco Mazzanti as Riccardo Masci
- Simona Caparrini as Avvocato Lucidi
- Mino Caprio as Notaio Lana

== Episodes ==
No.	Title	Original release date
1	"Episode 1"	1 April 2014
2	"Episode 2"	8 April 2014
3	"Episode 3"	15 April 2014
4	"Episode 4"	22 April 2014
5	"Episode 5"	29 April 2014
6	"Episode 6"	6 May 2023

== Production ==
The series was filmed in several parts of Trentino-Alto Adige, including Mezzocorona, the Lago di Toblino, and Madonna di Campiglio.
