= Radost Bokel =

German actress

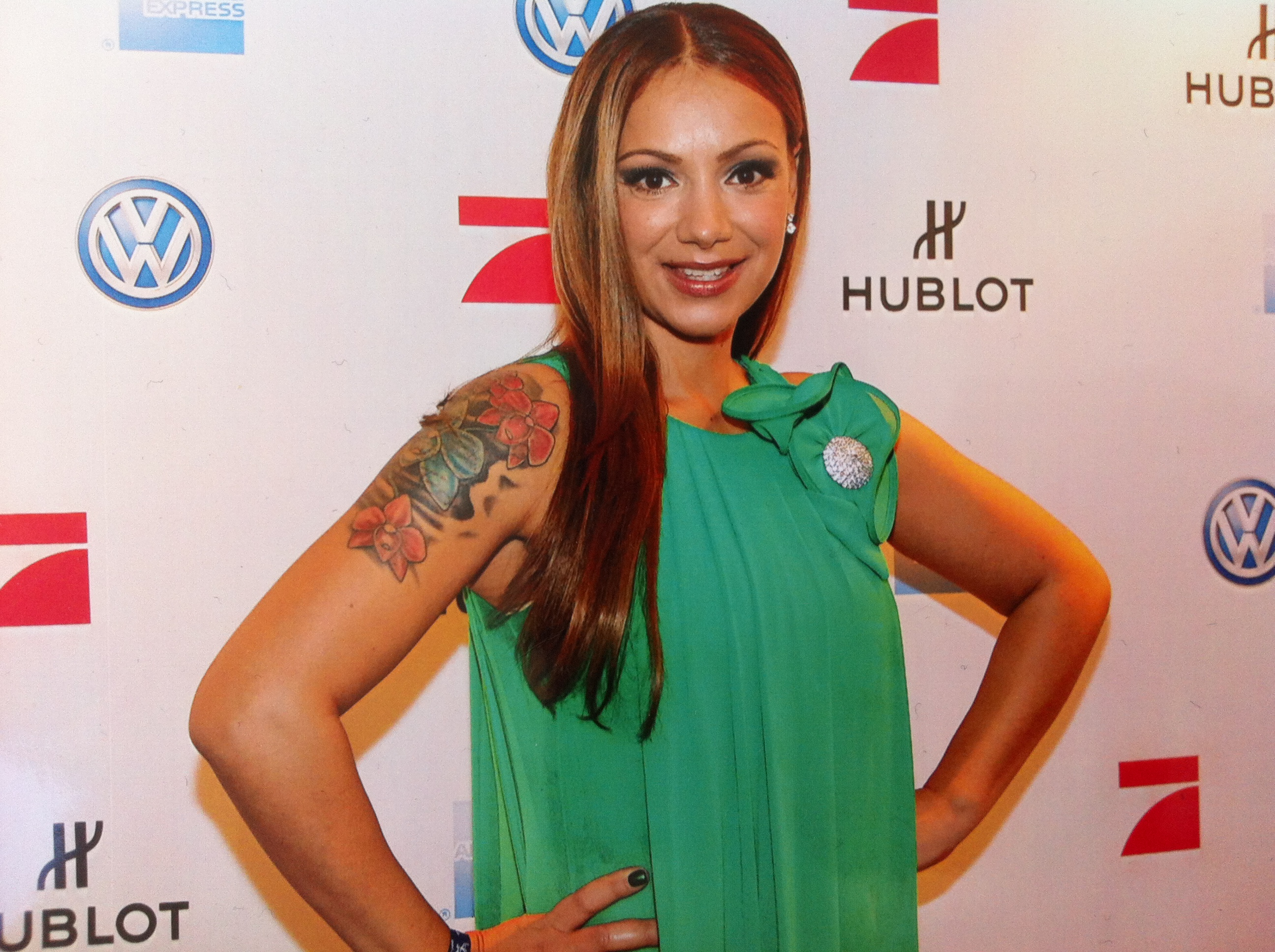
Radost Bokel in 2012.

Radost Bokel (born 4 June 1975 in Bad Langensalza) is a German actress.

== Life ==
In 1980, at the age of five, Radost Bokel moved with her German mother and brother from her hometown Halle (Saale), East Germany across the border to Frankfurt am Main, West Germany. Her Slavic first name Radost comes from her Bulgarian Romani father, whom she never met. In an interview from 2022 she stated, I have Romani roots. In Frankfurt, Bokel did her Abitur at the Gymnasium Schillerschule. It was at this time that she gained her first stage experience: she spent the afternoons in a day-care center, with whom she performed as Eliza in My Fair Lady and as Mowgli in Jungle Book at performances in old people's homes occurred. Bokel works as an actress in Germany. As a child, she starred in the film Momo Later she appeared in several other German films. In 2008, Bokel married singer Tyler Woods with whom she has a son. The marriage ended in divorce in 2015; Bokel lives in Germany.

== Filmography ==
- 1986: Momo
- 1986: Please, Let the Flowers Live
- 1986: Valhalla (German voice)
- 1987: The Secret of the Sahara (TV)
- 1989: Rivalen der Rennbahn (TV)
- 1989: Schuldig (TV)
- 1989: Tatort: Herzversagen
- 1994: Der Fahnder (TV)
- 1994: Einsatz für Lohbeck (TV)
- 1995: Wolffs Revier (TV)
- 1996: Doppelter Einsatz: Rallye mit Hindernissen
- 1997: Das erste Semester
- 1998: Dr. med. Mord
- 1998: First love: Die große Liebe (TV)
- 2002: Klinik unter Palmen: Kuba (TV)
- 2003: Klinik unter Palmen (TV)
- 2005: SOKO Kitzbühel (TV)
- 2006: Das Traumhotel (TV)
- 2006: SOKO Rhein-Main (TV)
- 2006: Der Staatsanwalt (TV)
- 2007–2011: Der Staatsanwalt
- 2013: Ein Fall für die Anrheiner
- 2015: Kreuzfahrt ins Glück

== Awards ==
- Bambi for Momo
