= Stefano D'Arrigo =

Italian writer

Stefano D'Arrigo (15 October 1919 – 2 May 1992) was an Italian writer. He published three books, the collection of poetry Codice Siciliano (The Sicilian Code), the epic Horcynus Orca (Killer Whale, ISBN 88-17-87228-8) and the novel Cima delle Nobildonne.

D'Arrigo was born in Alì Terme, in the province of Messina. He graduated from the University of Messina, where a park is named in his honour.

He worked on Horcynus Orca from about 1950 until it was published in 1975. Originally it was called La testa del delfino, and was renamed I giorni della fera (that became I Fatti della Fera) for its first planned publication in 1961 on the review Menabó, directed by Elio Vittorini. In 2000, the galley proofs of I fatti della fera were published (ISBN 88-17-66981-4), giving readers a chance to compare the two versions: 1961's 660 pages, and 1975's 1,270. D’Arrigo dedicated Horcynus Orca to his wife Jutta Bruto because she helped him in the drafting of it. Italian translator specializing in Sicilian literature Stephen Sartarelli began a translation of the novel in the 1980s but it has not yet been published. An excerpt appears in Peter Forbes's translation of Primo Levi's anthology, The Search for Roots (ISBN 1566635047).

In 1961 D'Arrigo played a minor role in Pasolini’s first film, Accattone.

He died in 1992 in Rome.

== Filmography ==
Year	Title	Role	Notes
1961	Accattone	Il giudice istruttore	
