= Guido Mannari =

Italian film and television actor (1944–1988)

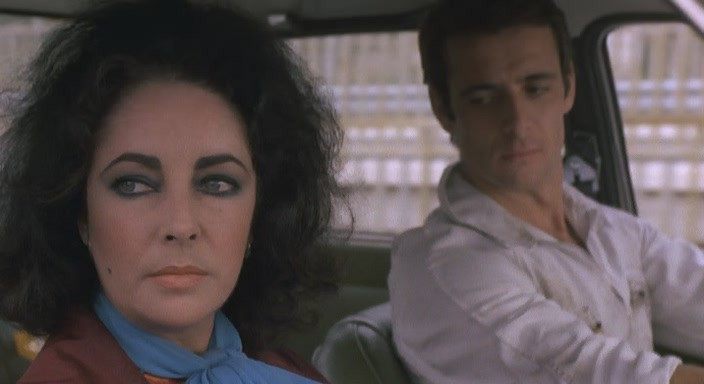
- Elizabeth Taylor and Guido Mannari in The Driver's Seat (1974)
- Born: 13 December 1944; Rosignano Marittimo, Province of Livorno, Castiglioncello, Italy
- Died: 10 August 1988 (aged 43); Rosignano Marittimo, Province of Livorno, Castiglioncello, Italy
- Other name: Vincent Mannari Jr.
- Occupation: Actor
- Years active: 1967–1985

Guido Mannari (13 December 1944 – 10 August 1988) was an Italian actor of film and television.

== Life and career ==
Guido was born in Castiglioncello, Province of Livorno into a large family. He had three half-brothers. His father, Giulio Mannari, was a farmer, who worked on a local farm. His mother Lina was one of the most beautiful women in the town. Before starting his acting career, Mannari was a semi-professional soccer player and played for his local team. He was a fullback at Unione Sportiva Città di Pontedera.

Guido Mannari moved to Rome at a young age and decided to pursue a career as an actor, inspired by the movie Il sorpasso, which was filmed in Castiglioncello, his native town. After playing in the avant-garde theatre for a short time in the capital, he decided to go to the United States for a year in order to master his future profession.

Spending a year in America, he returned to Italy and made his first debut in Arabella (1967) directed by Mauro Bolognini. Then he was chosen by Bolognini to play a scene of rape in the Italian drama film L'assoluto naturale (internationally released as He and She and She and He), a scene that at the time raised a slight of controversities and launched his career. He was a model and had starred in fashion magazines. He also posed for Playmen and Party.

During the filming of Squadra antiscippo, there was an incident between actress Maria Rosaria Omaggio and Guido. In the scene, which was carried out in Monte Sacro, Omaggio was to be assaulted, beaten and stripped by a gang of four thugs. The scene was repeated several times: as the actress was thrown to the ground and pressed slaps by Guido Mannari, Omaggio hit her head on the asphalt, losing consciousness, but was rescued by director Bruno Corbucci, who was directing the filming. Omaggio was slightly injured in the mouth, but did not want to be taken to the hospital.

Guido has been cast to play Macro in Caligula, directed by Tinto Brass. Due to his handsome appearance and talent, Mannari was perfect for this role. Guido Mannari spoke English fluently, but because of his accent he was dubbed by Patrick Allen. In a scene in which Macro swears his allegiance to Caligula, Mannari held his arm over an open flame long enough to be severely burned.

Guido Mannari was in a relationship with Elizabeth Taylor, with whom he got an acquaintance during the filming of the movie The Driver's Seat in 1974. But it was a brief love affair.

After the age of 35 he was no longer invited to play senior roles due to his overweight.

Mannari played a number of leading roles, but his career was mainly limited to conventional roles of handsome seducer. Towards the end of his life he became very religious. He became a member of Jehovah's Witnesses. Guido Mannari died from a heart attack at the age of 43 while out jogging in Castiglioncello.

== Filmography ==
Guido appeared in 20 movies. Here is the list of them:

Year	Title	Role	Notes
1967	Arabella		
1969	L'assoluto naturale	First Mechanic	
1971	Mazzabubù... Quante corna stanno quaggiù?	Baciatore allo stadio	
1971	The Decameron	Painter’s assistant	
1971	Madness - Gli occhi della luna	Valerio	
1971	Un peu de soleil dans l'eau froide	Thomas	
1971	Blindman	Mexican Officer	
1973	Storia de fratelli e de cortelli	Gigi	
1973	Brothers Blue	Kane Blue	
1973	Number One	Massimo	
1974	The Driver's Seat	Carlo	also known as Identikit
1974	Orlando furioso	Duca Bireno	
1975	Cormack of the Mounties	Cariboo	
1976	The Cop in Blue Jeans	Achille Pettinari aka Baronetto	
1979	Caligula	Macro	
1979	Return of the Saint	Franco	
1980	Il medium	Signore Paul	
1980	Eden no sono	the Detective	
1984	Windsurf - Il vento nelle mani	Muscetta	
1985	Telefonema na Madrugada		(final film role)

== See also ==
- List of Italian actors
