= Bartleby (1976 film) =

French film adaptation of Herman Melville's story

Bartleby is a 1976 French drama film directed by Maurice Ronet and starring Michael Lonsdale, Maxence Mailfort and Maurice Biraud. It is an adaptation of the short story "Bartleby, the Scrivener" by Herman Melville.

== Plot ==
Bartleby is a loner who gets hired as a clerk when a lawyer is desperate to find a reliable assistant. Unfortunately, Bartleby isn't happy with his work. He falls into passivity and depression. When the law office moves, Bartleby prefers to stay in the abandoned rooms. People get fascinated by his strange behaviour.

== Cast ==
- Michael Lonsdale as the bailiff
- Maxence Mailfort as Bartleby
- Maurice Biraud as Dindon
- Dominique Zardi as Cisaille
- Jacques Fontanelle as Gingembre
- Hubert Deschamps as the manager
- Albert Michel as the prison cook
- Philippe Brigaud as the vice director of the prison
- Michel Fortin as the taxi driver
- Henri Attal as the prison guard
- Maurice Ronet as the narrator

== Release ==
Bartleby was released in France in 1978.
