= Bawdy Tales =

- Italian: Storie scellerate
- Directed by: Sergio Citti
- Written by: Pier Paolo Pasolini; Sergio Citti
- Story by: Pier Paolo Pasolini
- Produced by: Alberto Grimaldi
- Starring: Ninetto Davoli; Franco Citti; Nicoletta Machiavelli
- Cinematography: Tonino Delli Colli
- Edited by: Nino Baragli
- Music by: Francesco De Masi
- Release date: 1973
- Running time: 93 minutes
- Country: Italy
- Language: Italian

Storie scellerate, internationally released as Bawdy Tales, is a 1973 Italian comedy film directed by Sergio Citti.

== Plot ==
The film is set in the Rome of the Papal States in the 19th century. Bernardino and Mammone, who have been imprisoned and condemned to death for robbing and murdering a man, pass their last hours telling ribald stories of adultery.

The first is about Nicolino and the Duke of Ronciglione, both betrayed by their wives. Nicolino take revenge through an honor killing, while the Duke castrates himself in front of his wife.

The second story tells of a Calabrian shepherd who murders his friend after discovering he has been taking advantage of his wife. He has her eat her lover’s testicles, pretending they are from cattle.

In the third story, a dissolute priest gets his servant to procure a young woman for him to seduce under the guise of spiritual advice, but his servant, dressed as the woman in mourning veils, murders him and is guillotined.

In the last story, a husband who has spent all of his money to gain his young wife’s affection, tells her that since he is now broke, he intends to kill himself. The wife suggests prostituting herself to an elderly man who has shown an interest in her and although their ménage-à-trois begins amicably, it ends with the two men murdering the wife’s new younger lover.

As Bernardino and Mammone are brought to the gallows, we see a scene of Judgment Day where the archangel is listing the crimes of the characters from the stories and asking them how they plead. The two husbands and the wife give self-serving answers about how they wish to go to Paradise and serve the Lord whom they have always cherished while the young man says he would prefer to go back to Earth so he can screw around and get drunk like in the old times. The angel banishes the three to Hell but sends the young lover to Paradise. The two thieves now have the nooses around their throats and are laughing, almost in tears at the funny ending to the story. They are executed, and the film ends on a shot of them hanging lifeless from the nooses to jaunty music.

== Cast ==
- Franco Citti: Mammone
- Ninetto Davoli: Bernardino
- Nicoletta Machiavelli: Caterina di Ronciglione
- Silvano Gatti: Duca di Ronciglione
- Enzo Petriglia: Nicolino
- Santino Citti: Il Padreterno
- Giacomo Rizzo: Don Leopoldo
- Gianni Rizzo: Il cardinale
