= Viper (film) =

2001 film

- Directed by: Sergio Citti
- Written by: Sergio Citti; Andrea Crisanti; Vincenzo Cerami
- Cinematography: Blasco Giurato
- Music by: Nicola Piovani
- Release date: 2001

Viper (Italian: Vipera) is a 2001 Italian drama film directed by Sergio Citti.

== Premise ==
Sicily between the end of World War II and the fifties. Vipera (Elide Melli) is married to a Sicilian smithy. She meets a man who shows her that life can be better and she promptly leaves her husband and young daughter.

== Cast ==
- Harvey Keitel as Leone
- Elide Melli as Vipera
- Giancarlo Giannini as Guastamacchia
- Larissa Volpentesta as Young Rosetta
- Annalisa Schettino as Adult Rosetta
- Rosario Ainnusa as Fortunato
- Paolo Pini as Luca
- Maurizio Nicolosi as Maniscalpo
- Ante Novakovic as Fascist Soldier
