= Maxence Mailfort =

French film and television actor (born 1949)

- Born: February 24, 1949
- Occupation(s): film and television actor

Maxence Mailfort (born 24 February 1949) is a French film and television actor.

== Selected filmography ==
- The Discreet Charm of the Bourgeoisie (1972)
- George Who? (1973)
- Identikit (1974)
- Successive Slidings of Pleasure (1974)
- Bartleby (1976)
