= Franco Citti =

Italian actor (1935–2016)

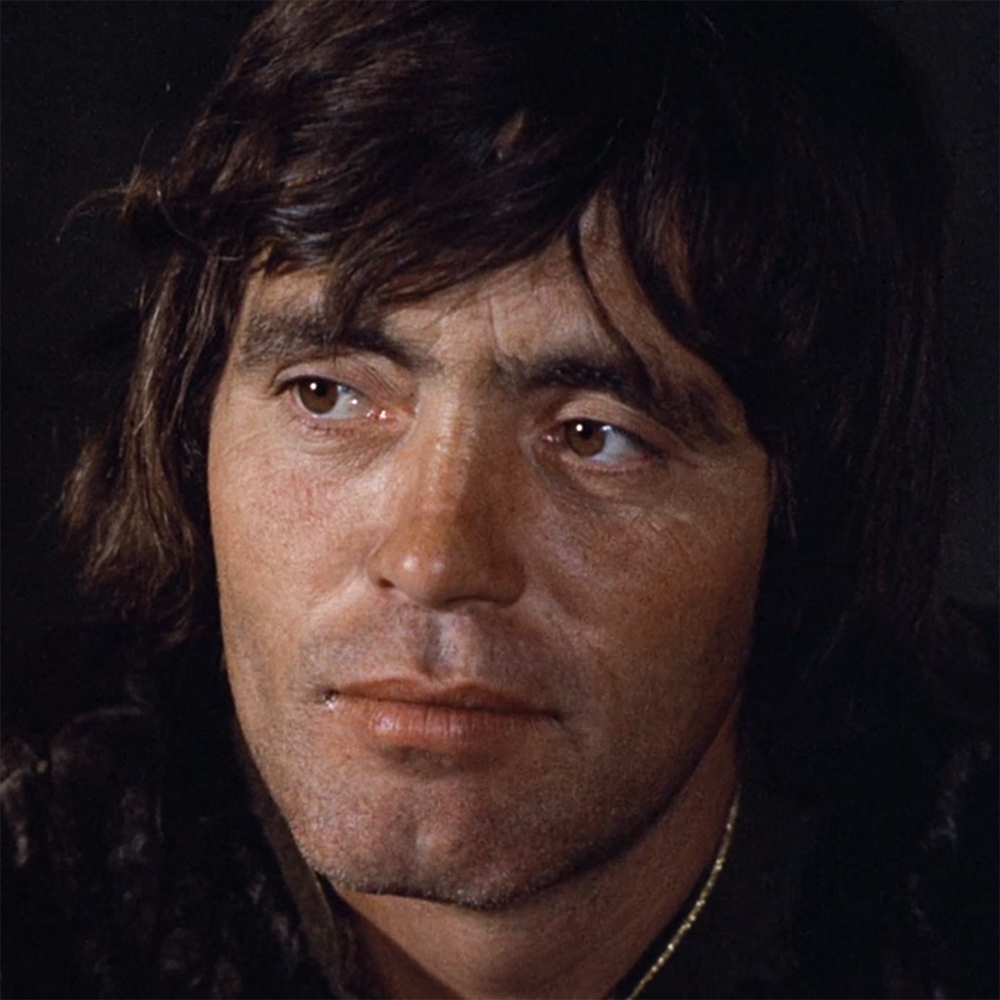
- Franco Citti in The Decameron (1971)
- Born: 23 April 1935; Rome, Italy
- Died: 14 January 2016 (aged 80); Rome, Italy
- Occupation: Actor
- Years active: 1961–2002
- Relatives: Sergio Citti (brother)

Franco Citti (Italian: [ˈfraŋko ˈtʃitti]; 23 April 1935 – 14 January 2016) was an Italian actor, best known as one of the close collaborators of director Pier Paolo Pasolini. He came to fame for playing the title role in Pasolini's film Accattone, which brought him a BAFTA Award nomination for Best Foreign Actor. He subsequently starred in six of Pasolini's films, as well as 60 other film and television roles. His brother was the director and screenwriter Sergio Citti.

== Biography ==
Citti was born in Rome in 1935 and was raised with his older brother Sergio Citti, working as a painter and day laborer. At the age of 26, he was discovered by Pier Paolo Pasolini, who appreciated his distinctly Roman features, and cast him in the title role of his 1961 directorial debut Accattone. Citti led a cast of other non-professional actors, and proved the breakthrough of the cast, earning a BAFTA Award nomination for a Best Foreign Actor, as well as a nomination for a Nastro d'Argento for Best Actor.

Pasolini cast him in six of his subsequent films, making him one of the filmmaker's close creative collaborators. He played Carmine, opposite Anna Magnani, in Mamma Roma (1962), the title character in Oedipus Rex (1967), a cannibal in Pigsty (1969), Ser Ciappelletto in The Decameron (1971), Satan in The Canterbury Tales (1972), and the Demon in Arabian Nights (1974). He appeared in Laura Betti's 2002 documentary Pier Paolo Pasolini e la ragione di un sogno, in which he discussed his working relationship with Pasolini.

Citti also worked with such notable filmmakers as Sergio Corbucci, Carlo Lizzani, Valerio Zurlini, and Bernardo Bertolucci. He appeared in a number of films directed by his brother Sergio, and co-directed with him the 1998 film Cartoni animati. Citti is perhaps best known for his role as Sicilian bodyguard Calò in The Godfather and The Godfather: Part III, uttering the memorable line "In Sicily, women are more dangerous than shotguns."

He died in Rome on 14 January 2016, at the age of 80, after a long illness.

== Filmography ==
- Accattone (1961) (Pier Paolo Pasolini) - Vittorio "Accattone" Cataldi
- Violent Life (1962) - Tommaso
- Mamma Roma (1962) (Pier Paolo Pasolini)
- The Shortest Day (1963) (Sergio Corbucci) - Fante Romano
- Du mouron pour les petits oiseaux (1963) (Marcel Carné) - Renato
- Requiescant (1967) (Carlo Lizzani) - Burt
- Oedipus Rex (1967) (Pier Paolo Pasolini) - Edipo
- Black Jesus (1968) (Valerio Zurlini) - Oreste
- Kill Them All and Come Back Alone (1968) (Enzo G. Castellari) - Hoagy
- Il magnaccio (1969) (Franco De Rosis)
- Gangster's Law (1969) - Bruno Esposito
- Pigsty (1969) (Pier Paolo Pasolini) - Cannibal
- Una ragazza di Praga (1969) (Sergio Pastore) - Alberto Marini
- Gli angeli del 2000 (1969) - Franco
- Ostia (1970) (Sergio Citti) - Rabbino
- The Decameron (1971) (Pier Paolo Pasolini) - Ciappelletto
- La primera entrega (1971)
- The Godfather (1972) (Francis Ford Coppola) - Calò - Sicilian Sequence
- The Canterbury Tales (1972) (Pier Paolo Pasolini) - The Devil
- Bawdy Tales (1973) (Sergio Citti) - Artemio
- Storia de fratelli e de cortelli (1974) (Mario Amendola) - Artemio
- Ingrid sulla strada (1973) (Brunello Rondi) - Renato
- Giuda uccide il venerdì (1974)
- Arabian Nights (1974) (Pier Paolo Pasolini) - The Demon
- Chi dice donna dice donna (1976) (Tonino Cervi) - Benito (segment "La signorina X")
- Colpita da improvviso benessere (1976) (Franco Giraldi) - Luiso Malerba
- Live Like a Cop, Die Like a Man (1976) (Ruggero Deodato) - Rudy
- Todo modo (1976) (Elio Petri) - Autista di M.
- Rome: The Other Side of Violence (1976) (Marino Girolami) - Berte
- Puttana galera! (1976) (Gianfranco Piccioli) - Ciro
- Destruction Force (1977) (Stelvio Massi) - Antonio Lanza
- Watch Me When I Kill (Il gatto dagli occhi di giada 1977) (Antonio Bido) - Pasquale Ferrante
- Beach House (1977) (Sergio Citti) - Nando
- La Luna (1979) (Bernardo Bertolucci) - Man in Bar
- L'albero della maldicenza (1979) (Giacinto Bonacquisti) - Angelo Maria
- Ciao marziano (1980) (Pier Francesco Pingitore) - Er Cinese
- Eroina (1980) (Massimo Pirri) - Alfredo, il 'Sceriffo'
- Il minestrone (1981) (Sergio Citti) - Francesco
- Pè sempe (1982)
- The Black Stallion Returns (1983) (Robert Dalva) - Foreign Legion Officer
- The Malady of Love (1986) (Giorgio Treves) - Cigal
- Rosso di sera (1988) (Beppe Cino) - Franco
- Kafka la colonia penale (1988)
- The Secret (1990) - Franco
- The Godfather: Part III (1990) (Francis Ford Coppola) - Calò
- Appuntamento in nero (1990) - Projectionist
- El infierno prometido (1992) - Caronte
- Power and Lovers (1994) - Michele
- We Free Kings (1996) (Sergio Citti)
- Festival (1996) (Pupi Avati)
- The Mayor (1997) (Ugo Fabrizio Giordani)
- Cartoni animati (1997) (Franco Citti and Sergio Citti) - Peppe
- E insieme vivremo tutte le stagioni (1999) (Gianni Minello) - (final film role)
- Pier Paolo Pasolini e la ragione di un sogno (2002) (Laura Betti) - Himself

== Awards and nominations ==
Avellino Neorealism Film Festival

- Special Mention (Accattone)

=== British Academy Film Award ===
- Best Foreign Actor (Accattone)

=== Nastro d'Argento ===
- Best Actor (Accattone)
