= Giuseppe Zigaina =

Italian painter (1924–2015)

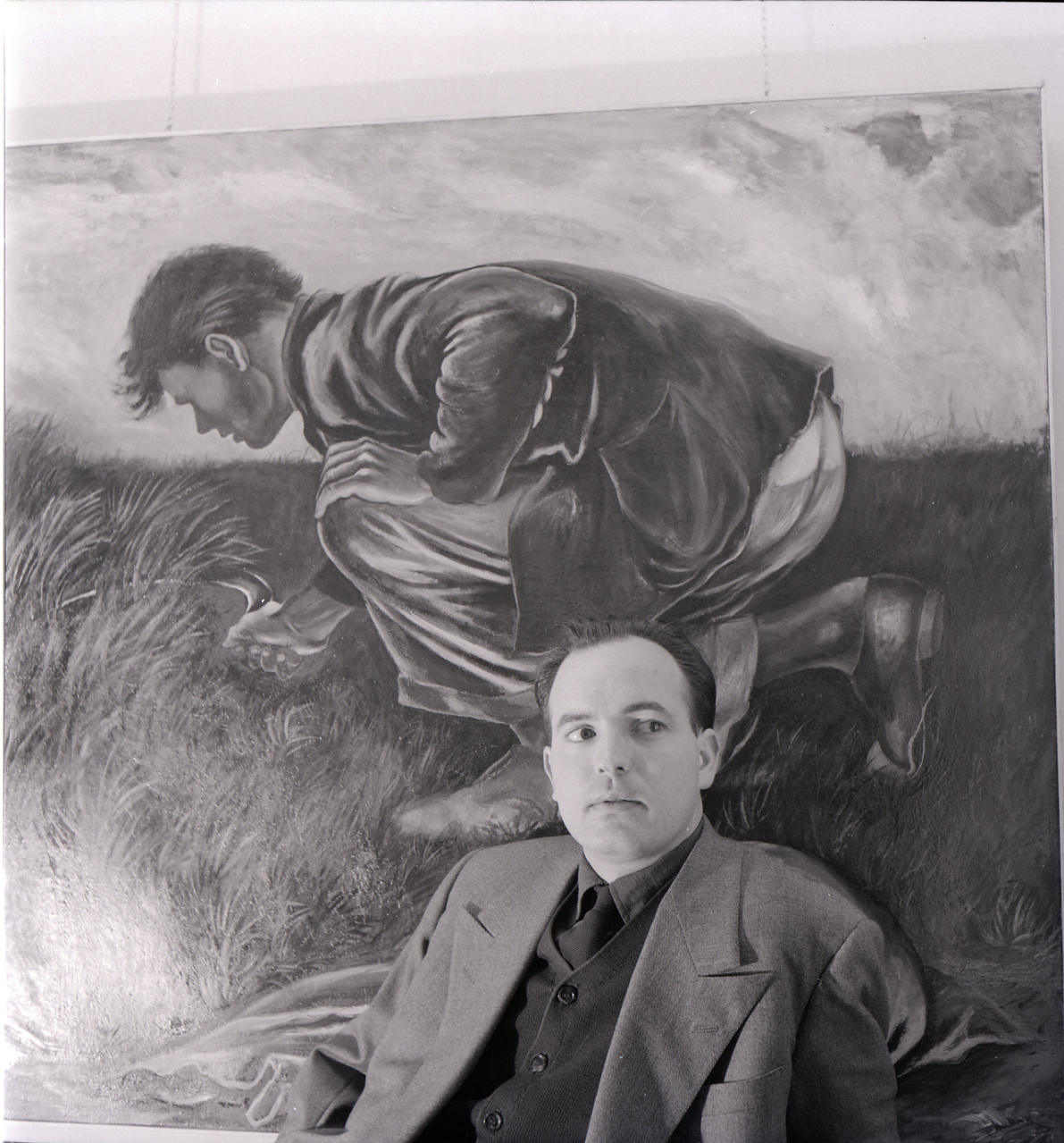
- Giuseppe Zigaina portrayed by Paolo Monti
- Born: 2 April 1924; Cervignano del Friuli, Udine, Italy
- Died: 16 April 2015 (aged 91); Palmanova, Udine, Italy

Giuseppe Zigaina ( 2 April 1924 – 16 April 2015) was an Italian neorealist painter and an author.

== Life and career ==
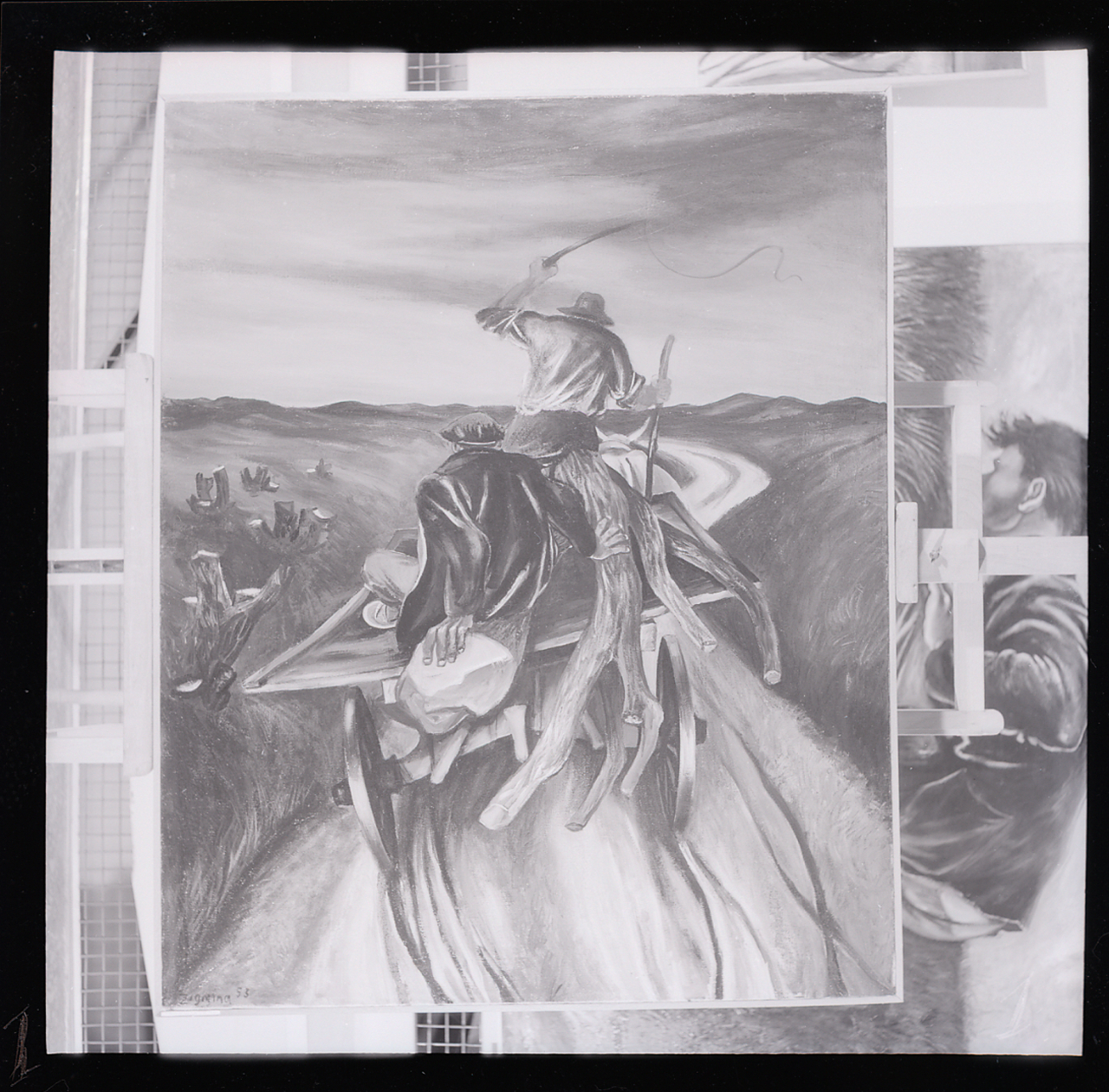
Painting by Zigaina. Photo by Paolo Monti, 1960 (Fondo Paolo Monti, BEIC).

Born in Cervignano del Friuli, Udine, as a child Zigaina showed an early propensity for drawing. He studied at the College of Tolmino, and at 19 he held his first exhibition. In 1946 he met Pier Paolo Pasolini, with whom he established a solid artistic collaboration which included the illustration of some books and the involvement in some films as an actor and as a writer. After the death of Pasolini Zigaina wrote several books about his art.

After winning the Fontanesi Prize at the Venice Biennale in 1950, Zigaina's works were gradually influenced by the German New Objectivity. Starting from 1965 he eventually adopted the technique of engraving, which became gradually distinctive of his artistic production. In 1984 Zigaina moved to San Francisco to teach at the Art Institute.
