= Momo (1986 film) =

- Theatrical release poster by Renato Casaro
- Directed by: Johannes Schaaf
- Written by: Johannes Schaaf; Rosemarie Fendel; Michael Ende; Marcello Coscia
- Based on: Momo by Michael Ende
- Produced by: Horst Wendlandt
- Starring: Radost Bokel; Mario Adorf; Armin Mueller-Stahl; Sylvester Groth; Leopoldo Trieste; Ninetto Davoli; Bruno Stori; John Huston
- Cinematography: Xaver Schwarzenberger
- Edited by: Amedeo Salfa
- Music by: Angelo Branduardi
- Production company: Rialto Film
- Distributed by: Tobis
- Release date: July 17, 1986
- Countries: West Germany; Italy
- Box office: 2,083,890 admissions (Germany)

Momo is a 1986 fantasy film directed by Johannes Schaaf and based on the 1973 novel Momo by Michael Ende. It is about the concept of time and how it is used by humans in modern societies. The film features the final theatrical role of actor/writer/director John Huston released during his lifetime.

== Synopsis ==
In the ruins of an amphitheatre just outside an unnamed Italian city lives Momo, a little girl of mysterious origin. She is remarkable in the neighbourhood because she has the extraordinary ability to listen. By simply being with people and listening to them, she can help them find answers to their problems, make up with each other, and think of fun games.

This pleasant atmosphere is spoiled by the arrival of the Men in Grey. These strange individuals represent the Timesavings Bank and promote the idea of timesaving among the population, time which can be deposited to the Bank and returned to the client later with interest. In reality, the more time people save, the less they have. The time they save is actually lost to them, consumed by the Men in Grey. Momo, however, is a wrench in the plans of the Timesaving Bank thanks to her special personality.

== Cast ==
- Radost Bokel as Momo
- Leopoldo Trieste as Beppo
- Bruno Stori as Gigi
- Mario Adorf as Nicola
- Armin Mueller-Stahl as Grey Leader
- John Huston as Meister Hora
- Concetta Russino as Liliana
- Sylvester Groth as Agent BLW/553 X
- Ninetto Davoli as Nino
- Francesco De Rosa as Herr Fusi
- Elide Melli as Frau Daria
- Michael Ende as Train Passenger

== Author involvement ==
This film was a German-Italian co-production in which original novel writer Michael Ende himself played the role of the passenger in the train who is told the story by Master Hora (John Huston) and writes it down). It appears that Ende, unhappy with how the film based on The Neverending Story did not follow the spirit of the book faithfully enough, requested to be involved more directly in filming Momo.

== Reception ==
The film was the third highest-grossing German film in West Germany for the year with admissions of 2,083,890.
