= The Driver's Seat (film) =

Identikit The Driver's Seat
- Italian film poster
- Directed by: Giuseppe Patroni Griffi
- Written by: Raffaele La Capria; Giuseppe Patroni Griffi
- Based on: The Driver's Seat by Muriel Spark
- Produced by: Nello Meniconi; Franco Rossellini
- Starring: Elizabeth Taylor; Ian Bannen; Guido Mannari; Mona Washbourne; Luigi Squarzina; Maxence Mailfort; Andy Warhol
- Cinematography: Vittorio Storaro
- Edited by: Franco Arcalli
- Music by: Franco Mannino
- Distributed by: AVCO Embassy Pictures
- Release date: 20 May 1974
- Running time: 105 mins
- Country: Italy
- Languages: Italian; English

The Driver's Seat (also known as Identikit) is a 1974 Italian drama film directed by Giuseppe Patroni Griffi. Based on the 1970 novella The Driver's Seat by Muriel Spark, it is a psychological drama starring Elizabeth Taylor and Ian Bannen, and featuring Andy Warhol.

== Plot ==
Lise, a mentally unbalanced middle-aged woman, travels from her home in Copenhagen to Rome, where she embarks on a search for a man who will agree to help her fulfill her morbid fantasy of being murdered; though she does not have a specific man in mind, she feels she will know the man when she sees him. She avoids explaining her plan to those she encounters, allowing them to mistakenly believe that she is simply on holiday.

On the plane, a young man becomes inexplicably terrified at the sight of Lise and rushes off the plane to get away from her, subsequently missing his flight. During the flight, Lise meets Bill, a lecherous British macrobiotics devotee who expresses sexual interest in her; Lise, however, asserts that she has no interest in sex. Upon departing, Bill offers to give her a ride and continually tries to seduce her, though she declines his advances. Bill kisses her before dropping her off at a hotel. The next morning, Lise meets an elderly woman named Helen who needs to purchase a pair of slippers for her nephew, Pierre, who is coming to visit her. Lise accompanies Helen to a department store; while there, she purchases a scarf, which she intends to order her assailant to bind her hands with when she finally meets him. Helen encourages Lise to pursue a relationship with Pierre, whom she claims would be perfect for Lise, but Lise declines due to Pierre being significantly younger than her.

While leaving, Lise and Helen encounter the scene of a car accident. Lise is injured while fleeing, whereupon a young man named Carlo carries her into his car. As he drives off with her, Lise quickly becomes agitated and demands to be let out, reaffirming her disinterest in sex and proclaiming that she is already late for a date. Carlo finally stops the car, but instead of freeing Lise, he attempts to rape her. Lise escapes and steals his car, which she uses to drive herself back to the hotel.

Lise eventually encounters Pierre, revealed to be the same man who fled the airplane, in a public park. Despite her early reservations about him due to their age difference, she immediately identifies him as "the one" who will realize her fantasy. She begs Pierre to murder her, offering him a dagger and giving him a list of specific instructions on how she wishes to be stabbed, and is undeterred by his desperate insistence that he does not want to hurt her. He eventually reluctantly agrees and binds her wrists and ankles with the scarves she purchased before stabbing her repeatedly in the chest while she loudly encourages him to carry out the actions. The following morning, a group of investigators find her body.

Lise's story is interspersed with scenes of the local police interviewing the various people who had interacted with Lise in the events leading up to her murder, trying to ascertain what has happened to her and the reasoning for her erratic behavior prior to her death.

== Cast ==
- Elizabeth Taylor as Lise
- Ian Bannen as Bill
- Guido Mannari as Carlo
- Mona Washbourne as Mrs. Helen Fiedke
- Luigi Squarzina as Lead Detective
- Maxence Mailfort as Pierre
- Andy Warhol as English Lord
- Anita Bartolucci as Saleswoman
- Gino Giuseppe as Police Commissioner

== Release ==
When producer Franco Rossellini and director Giuseppe Patroni Griffi submitted the film to the Cannes Film Festival, it was dismissed as too commercial. Angered by the rejection, they staged a rival world premiere in Monte Carlo. Elizabeth Taylor and Andy Warhol attended, with Princess Grace and Prince Rainier hosting the premiere, which benefited the Monaco Red Cross.
