= Accattone =

1961 film by Pier Paolo Pasolini

- Original film poster
- Directed by: Pier Paolo Pasolini
- Written by: Pier Paolo Pasolini
- Produced by: Alfredo Bini; Cino Del Duca
- Starring: Franco Citti; Franca Pasut; Silvana Corsini
- Cinematography: Tonino Delli Colli
- Edited by: Nino Baragli
- Production company: Arco Film
- Distributed by: Titanus
- Release dates: 31 August 1961 (Venice); 25 September 1961 (Italy)
- Running time: 117 minutes
- Country: Italy
- Language: Italian

Accattone ([akkatˈto:ne], lit. "vagabond", "scrounger") is a 1961 Italian drama film written and directed by Pier Paolo Pasolini, and starring Franco Citti. It was Pasolini's first film as a director, as well as the acting debut for Citti, who would become a regular collaborator. It follows the life of Vittorio "Accattone" Cataldi, a pimp living on the outskirts of Rome.

The film premiered at the 22nd Venice International Film Festival, where it met with controversy over its provocative content, and was later withdrawn from general release over censorship, drawing condemnation from Pasolini and others. It was nonetheless critically acclaimed and earned three Nastro d'Argento nominations, including Best Director for Pasolini and Best Actor for Citti. Citti was also nominated for a BAFTA Award for Best Foreign Actor.

In 2008, the film was preserved by the Italian Ministry of Cultural Heritage’s 100 Italian films to be saved.

== Plot ==
Vittorio Cataldi, nicknamed "Accattone" (literally "scrounger"), lives a relatively calm life as a pimp on the outskirts of Rome. Using his wife, Maddalena, as a prostitute, and mooching bits from his own company, he is able to afford a living without working.

His world is disrupted when some members of the Mafia try to avenge their boss, Ciccio, Maddalena's ex husband who is now in jail because of Maddalena's report. To avoid the gang's wrath, Accattone gets rid of Maddalena, and the Mafia members injure her. What's more, Maddalena tries to frame two minor thieves, Cartagine and another boy, who are members of a minor gang led by Balilla. Therefore, the girls ends up in prison due to both false testimony and prostitution. With his income gone and little interest in regular work, Accattone initially attempts to reconcile with the estranged mother of his child but faces rejection from her relatives.

Turning to a simple working girl named Stella, Accattone endeavors to persuade her into prostitution. Despite her initial willingness, a traumatic encounter with her first client leaves her in tears, leading to her expulsion from the car. Falling in true love with the girl, Accattone briefly tries working as an iron worker to support them, but he abandons the effort after just one day.

In prison, Maddalena learns from fellow prostitute "Amore", who is arrested for prostitution, that her "beloved" now frequents another girl. Seeking revenge, Maddalena reports Accattone, and the police starts watching over him.

Haunted by a dream of his own death, Accattone turns to a life of theft with Balilla and his gang, ultimately meeting a tragic end in a traffic accident while attempting to evade the police on a stolen motorcycle. His last words, spoken to Cartagine, are "Ah, mo' sto bene" ("I'm feeling good now".)

== Cast ==
- Franco Citti as Vittorio "Accattone" Cataldi
- Franca Pasut as Stella
- Silvana Corsini as Maddalena
- Paola Guidi as Ascenza
- Adriana Asti as "Amore" ("Love")
- Adele Cambria as Nannina
- Luciano Conti as "Il Moicano" ("The Mohican")
- Luciano Gonini as "Piede d'Oro" ("Goldfoot")
- Renato Capogna as “Il Capogna”
- Alfredo Leggi as “Pupo Biondo” (“Blonde Baby”)
- Galeazzo Riccardi as “Cipolla” ("Onion")
- Leonardo Muraglia as "Mammoletto"
- Giuseppe Ristagno as “Peppe il Folle” (“Peppe the Mad”)
- Roberto Giovannoni as “Il Tedesco” (“The German”)
- Mario Cipriani as Balilla
- Roberto Scaringella as Cartagine
- Silvio Citti as Sabino
- Giovanni Orgitano as “Lo Scucchia”
- Piero Morgia as Pio
- Umberto Bevilacqua as Salvatore
- Franco Bevilacqua as Franco
- Amerigo Bevilacqua as Amerigo
- Sergio Fioravanti as Gennarino
- Adriano Mazzelli as “Il Sagrestano” (“The Sacristan”)
- Mario Castiglione as Mario
- Dino Frondi as Dino
- Tommaso Nuovo as Tommaso
- Emanuele di Bari as Pietro, Accattone’s brother
- Danilo Alleva as Iaio, Accattone’s son
- Romano Orazi as Accattone’s father-in-law
- Massimo Cacciafeste as Accattone’s brother-in-law
- Stefano D'Arrigo as Maigistrate
- Adriana Moneta as Margheritona
- Polidor as the gravedigger
- Sergio Citti as the waiter

== Production ==
=== Development ===
The film was initially supposed to be produced by Federiz, a short-lived production company founded by Federico Fellini and Angelo Rizzoli. Test shoots were arranged to assess Pasolini's work as a debuting director, but the test was flunked by Rizzoli's main collaborator Clemente Fracassi and the project was dismissed. Tonino Cervi was also interested, but failed to convince Carlo Ponti to produce the film.

Thanks to the efforts of Mauro Bolognini, who had previously collaborated with Pasolini and had been impressed by the film script, the project was eventually taken over by Alfredo Bini, who had just produced Bolognini's box office hit Il bell'Antonio, and who eventually involved prominent publisher Cino Del Duca in the film's funding.

=== Casting ===
The first choice for the title's role was Franco Interlenghi. Franco Citti, a non-actor who was working as a day laborer at the time, was cast because Pasolini appreciated his distinctly Roman features. Pasolini had strongly considered casting his friend Giorgio Cataldi, also a non-actor who later appeared in Salò, or the 120 Days of Sodom, but he was in jail at the time.

In the neorealist tradition, the vast majority of the cast were also non-professional actors, for whom this was their first and/or only film role. One of the few professional actors was Adriana Asti, who played a prostitute, and later became a Pasolini regular. Pasolini cast fellow writers Adele Cambria and Stefano D'Arrigo in supporting roles. Popular character actor Polidor made a cameo appearance as a gravedigger in a dream sequence.

Paola Guidi voice was dubbed by an uncredited Monica Vitti, one of her early film works.

=== Filming ===
Bernardo Bertolucci was an assistant director on the film, one of his earliest filmmaking credits. He would later describe the experience as his "film school."

=== Music ===
In lieu of an original soundtrack, the film is scored by classical music by Johann Sebastian Bach, which Pasolini would later also draw on for The Gospel According to St. Matthew. Carlo Rustichelli was the musical director.

== Release ==
Accattone's premiere at the 22nd Venice International Film Festival, the film was met with protests, in what would become a trend for Pasolini's films. A screening at the Cinema Barberini was interrupted by a group of neo-fascists who threw firecrackers into the audience and ink bottles at the screen, resulting in scuffles with the audience.

The film's certificate was withdrawn on November 22, 1961 following the intercession of Minister of Tourism and Entertainment. Federico Fellini publicly protested the censorship, one of the few overt political stances of his career, and producer Bini organized a roundtable featuring Fellini, Pasolini, and Giulio Carlo Argan.

== Reception ==
=== Critical response ===
Critic Gino Moliterno, writing for Senses of Cinema magazine, described Accatone and its successor Mamma Roma as cinematic renditions of the world of the "borgate" (Roman shanty towns) of Pasolini's novels Ragazzi di vita (The Ragazzi or The Street Kids, 1955) and Una vita violenta (A Violent Life, 1959). Nick Barbaro of The Austin Chronicle titled it the possibly grimmest film he had ever seen.

Review aggregation website Rotten Tomatoes gives the film an approval rating of 100% based on reviews from 16 critics.

=== Awards and nominations ===
| Institution | Year | Category | Recipient | Outcome |
|---|---|---|---|---|
| BAFTA Awards | 1963 | Best Foreign Actor | Franco Citti | Nominated |
| Nastro d'Argento | 1962 | Best Director | Pier Paolo Pasolini | Nominated |
| Nastro d'Argento | 1962 | Best Producer | Alfredo Bini | Won |
| Nastro d'Argento | 1962 | Best Actor | Franco Citti | Nominated |
| Karlovy Vary International Film Festival | 1962 | Crystal Globe | Pier Paolo Pasolini | Nominated |
| Karlovy Vary International Film Festival | 1962 | Main Prize | Pier Paolo Pasolini | Won |

=== Preservation ===
In 2008, the film was included on the Italian Ministry of Cultural Heritage’s 100 Italian films to be saved, a list of 100 films that "have changed the collective memory of the country between 1942 and 1978."

== Defamation lawsuit ==
Christian Democrat politician Salvatore Pagliuca sued Pasolini and the producers, claiming a minor character in the film was named after him and portrayed as a criminal, thereby defaming him. He was compensated for material damages. Pasolini later referred to the politician in his poem "Poeta delle Ceneri".

== In popular culture ==
English singer-songwriter Morrissey references the film in his song "You Have Killed Me," which appears on his 2006 album Ringleader of the Tormentors. The song's opening line is: "Pasolini is me, 'Accattone' you'll be..."

== See also ==
- List of films with a 100% rating on Rotten Tomatoes
