= We Free Kings (film) =

We Free Kings (I magi randagi)
- Directed by: Sergio Citti
- Written by: Sergio Citti, Pier Paolo Pasolini (original screen-play)
- Story by: Pier Paolo Pasolini
- Starring: Silvio Orlando, Franco Citti, Ninetto Davoli, Gastone Moschin
- Cinematography: Franco Di Giacomo
- Edited by: Ugo De Rossi
- Music by: Ennio Morricone
- Release date: 1996
- Running time: 130 min
- Country: Italy
- Language: Italian

I magi randagi, internationally released as We Free Kings, is a 1996 Italian comedy film directed by Sergio Citti.

The film won the Silver Ribbon for Best Original Story.

== Plot summary ==
Three amateur actors in theater are chased away by their performance, because the satirically subject from their complaint treats in a controversial manner the cruelty of the Nazis. The three actors take refuge in a rural country where they, having the bright idea to recite a sacred drama on the birth of Jesus Christ, have to interpret the three Biblical Magi. The show is so successful and magically the villagers give birth to a son on Christmas Eve for every family, and there the faith in Jesus is regained.

== Cast ==
- Silvio Orlando: Melchiorre
- Rolf Zacher: "Augusto"/ Gaspare
- Patrick Bauchau: Baldassarre
- Gastone Moschin: Don Gregorio
- Laura Betti: Chorus girl
- Franco Citti: Attore
- Ninetto Davoli: Comparsa

== Critical reception ==
In Time Out New York, Andrew Johnston (critic) wrote: "Warm performances from its lead troika and beautiful photography of the Italian countryside help compensate for the film's fairly flimsy nature. ... The humor is low-key but relatively consistent, and the three leads make a good comedy team."

== See also ==
- List of Christmas films
