= Sergio Citti =

Italian film director and screenwriter

- Born: 30 May 1933; Rome, Italy
- Died: 11 October 2005 (aged 72); Rome, Italy
- Occupations: Director; screenwriter
- Years active: 1961–2005

Sergio Citti (30 May 1933 – 11 October 2005) was an Italian film director and screenwriter, born in Rome. He often worked with Pier Paolo Pasolini but also worked for others such as Ettore Scola. His own films include We Free Kings, for which he won a Silver Ribbon for Best Original Story.

His 1981 film Il minestrone was entered into the 31st Berlin International Film Festival. His 1977 film Beach House was shown as part of a retrospective on Italian comedy at the 67th Venice International Film Festival.

He died in 2005 of a heart attack. He was the brother of actor Franco Citti.

== Filmography ==
=== Director ===
- Ostia (1970)
- Bawdy Tales (1973)
- Beach House (1977)
- Happy Hobos (1979)
- Il minestrone (1981)
- Sogni e bisogni (TV miniseries, 1985)
- Mortacci (1989)
- We Free Kings (1996)
- Esercizi di stile, segment Anche i cani ci guardano (1996)
- Cartoni animati (co-directed with Franco Citti, 1997)
- Vipera (2001)
- Fratella e sorello (2005)

=== Actor ===
- Accattone (1961) – Waiter
- Kill Them All and Come Back Alone (1968) – Soldier (uncredited)
- Festival (1996) – (final film role)
