= Nino Baragli =

Italian film editor

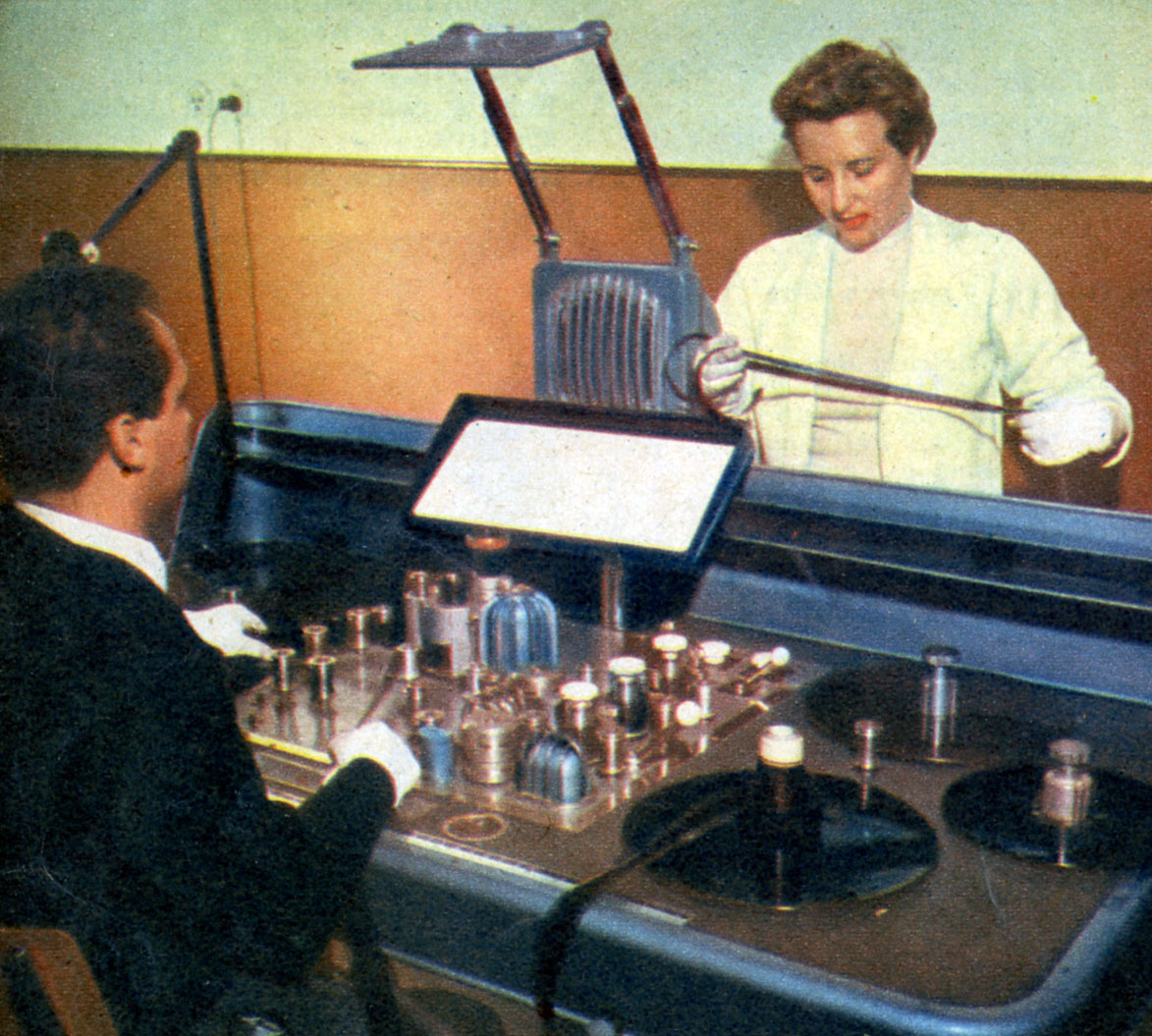
- Nino Baragli with his spouse at work in 1957
- Born: Giovanni Baragli; 1 October 1925; Rome, Kingdom of Italy
- Died: 29 May 2013 (aged 87); Rome, Italy
- Occupation: Film editor
- Years active: 1950–2008

Nino Baragli (1 October 1925 – 29 May 2013) was an Italian film editor with more than 200 film credits. Among his films in English, The Good, the Bad and the Ugly (1966) and Once Upon a Time in the West (1968), both directed by Sergio Leone, are perhaps the best known.

Born in Rome as Giovanni Baragli, he was introduced in the film industry by his uncle, the renowned editor Eraldo Da Roma. He started his career in 1944 as film operator and assistant editor for Marinai senza stelle by Francesco De Robertis.

During his career he worked as editor in more than 200 productions between 1944 and 1996, including works by Federico Fellini, Pier Paolo Pasolini, Sergio Leone, Damiano Damiani, Luigi Zampa, Giuliano Montaldo, Sergio Corbucci, Mauro Bolognini, Luigi Comencini, Cristina Comencini, Florestano Vancini, Gabriele Salvatores, Alberto Lattuada, Tinto Brass, Margarethe von Trotta, Pál Sándor, Bernardo Bertolucci, Roberto Benigni, Massimo Troisi.

== Collaboration with Pier Paolo Pasolini ==
The single largest impact of Baragli's editing is likely on the films of Pier Paolo Pasolini. Gino Moliterno as described Pasolini as follows:

Outside Italy Pasolini is usually remembered as one of the most significant of the directors who emerged in the second wave of Italian postwar cinema in the early 1960s but, within Italy itself, Pasolini was always much more than just a distinctive and innovative filmmaker. By the time he came to make his first film, Accattone, in 1961, he had already published numerous collections of poetry, two highly-acclaimed novels, had collaborated widely in cultural-literary journals and firmly established himself as one of Italy's leading writer-intellectuals.

Stefano Musi has called Baragli's contributions to Pasolini's films "enormous"; Baragli edited every one of Pasolini's feature films from his first, Accattone (1961), to his final film Salò, or the 120 Days of Sodom (1975), which was released shortly after his murder. Geoffrey Nowell-Smith has written of the editing innovations in their early films, "When Accatone and Mamma Roma came out, Pasolini and his editor Nino Baragli were widely condemned as amateurish and incompetent, which is rather like saying that Cezanne's brushstrokes showed that he couldn't paint." Perhaps the best-known of Pasolini's films to English-speaking audiences is The Gospel According to Saint Matthew (1964), now considered a masterpiece by many critics. Nowell-Smith writes of the editing that "large sections of the film do not even bother to respect continuity, let alone to pay obeisance to it. ... Each shot simply presents itself as reality in its own right but there is no attempt to maintain the realistic illusion that had been the foundation of cinema since the early 1920s if not before."

== Collaboration with Sergio Leone ==
Sergio Leone, an Italian director, is best known for five western films from the 1960s and early 1970s that enjoyed international success and established the acting career of Clint Eastwood. Dan Edwards summarized Leone's legacy, writing "Although he remains a controversial figure in critical circles, his stylistic influence is everywhere in '90s American cinema, from Back to the Future Part III (Robert Zemeckis, 1990) to the work of Quentin Tarantino and his associate Robert Rodriguez." Leone's third western was The Good, the Bad and the Ugly (1966), which was co-edited by Baragli and Eugenio Alabiso. Leone had several editors for his films prior to The Good, the Bad and the Ugly; Baragli edited all of Leone's subsequent films. Calling Baragli "Leone's best film editor", Robert Cumbow writes of the 1966 film that "the compelling pace of the film, and the fact that it works so remarkably well, ... is due to Baragli's genius." Leone's last film, released in 1984, was not a western; Cumbow writes of the film that "the time-hopping Once Upon a Time in America is a masterwork of editing." Kenneth Turan concurs, writing "The film slips easily back and forth in time, dancing between the decades, often making the connection from one era to another solely by means of brilliant cuts that work like magic." Stephen Prince wrote "Nino Baragli surpassed even his customary billiance with his editing of Sergio Leone's Once Upon a Time in America, creating a kaleidoscopic narrative that juggled multiple time frames with astonishingly fluid transitions." The film won Leone a nomination for the BAFTA Award for Best Direction.

== Final cuts ==
Baragli won the ciak d'oro for Ginger and Fred (1986) alongside Ugo de Rossi and Ruggero Mastroianni. He also won two David di Donatello for Best Editing for The Voice of the Moon (the last film directed by Federico Fellini-1990), Jonah Who Lived in the Whale (1993) and for Mediterraneo (directed by Gabriele Salvatores-1991). In 1998 he was awarded with the Nastro d'argento speciale (lit:Special Silver Ribbon) for his "extraordinary career in film editing".

Baragli retired from editing in 1996. One of his last projects to be released in the United States was The Monster (1994), which was directed by Roberto Benigni. Baragli had been editing Benigni's films for the previous decade.

In addition to his career as an editor, Baragli was active with the Italian Association of Film Editors (Associazione Montaggio Cinematografico e Televisivo (A.M.C.)) and served as its president for a time in the 1980s. In 2012 he received the Lifetime Achievement Award from the organization.

== See also ==
- List of film director and editor collaborations

== Bibliography ==
- Fawell, John (2005). The Art of Sergio Leone's Once Upon a Time in the West: A Critical Appreciation. McFarland. ISBN 9781476601816. Fawell's book discusses the editing of Once Upon a Time in the West in some detail, with numerous quotes from Baragli.
- Lancia, Enrico (1998). I premi del cinema (in Italian). Gremese Editore. p. 448. ISBN 88-7742-221-1.
- Reale, Giulio (producer and director) (2006). Sergio Leone: The Way I See Things (motion picture). Documentary about Leone that includes interview footage with Baragli.
