= Dino De Laurentiis =

Italian-American film producer (1919–2010)

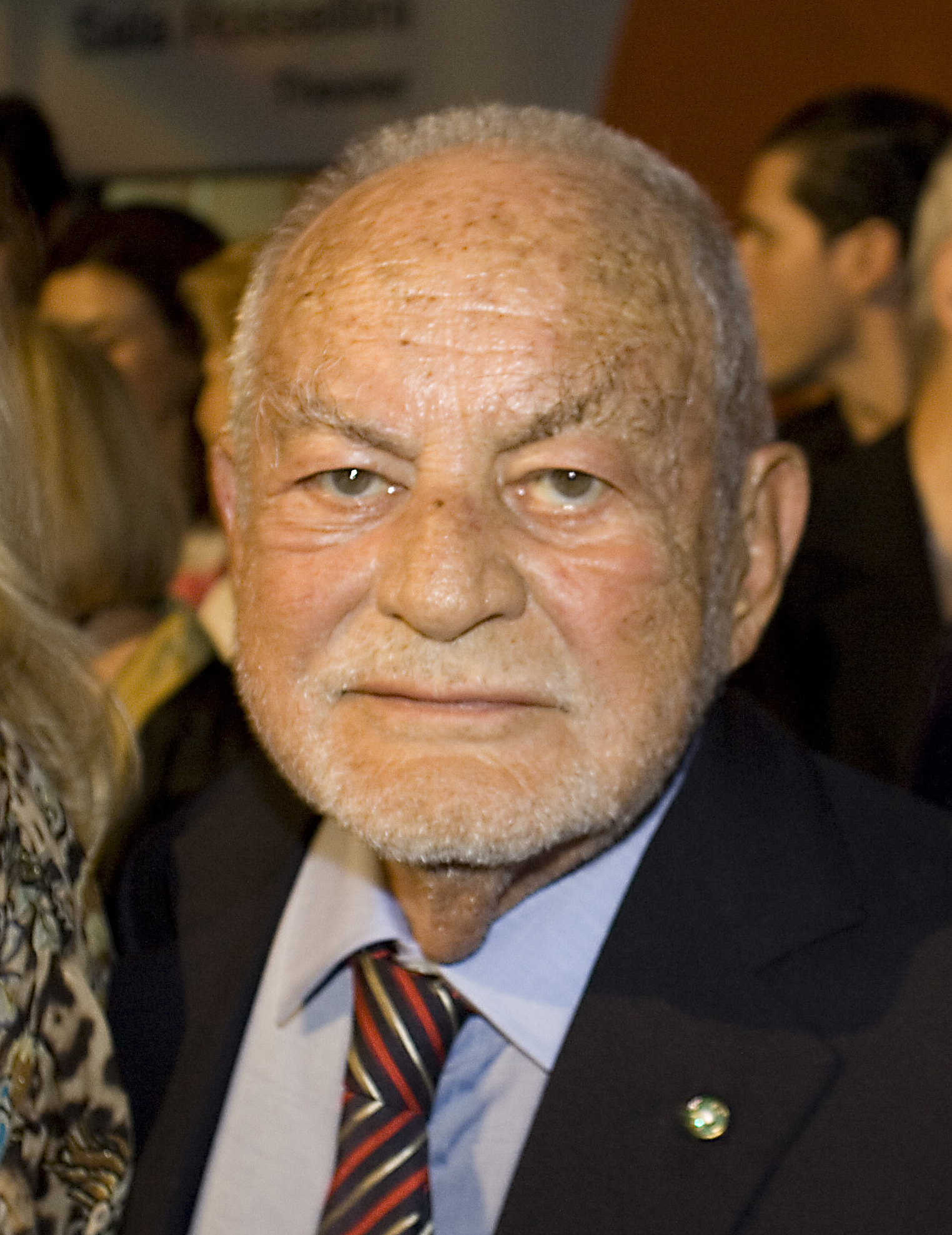
- De Laurentiis in 2009
- Born: Agostino De Laurentiis; 8 August 1919; Torre Annunziata, Campania, Kingdom of Italy
- Died: 10 November 2010 (aged 91); Beverly Hills, California, U.S.
- Resting place: Torre Annunziata, Italy
- Citizenship: Italy; United States (after 1986)
- Occupations: Film producer; businessman
- Years active: 1938–2010
- Spouses: Silvana Mangano (m. 1949; div. 1988); Martha Schumacher (m. 1990)
- Children: 6, including Veronica, Raffaella, and Federico
- Relatives: Luigi De Laurentiis (brother); Aurelio De Laurentiis (nephew); Giada De Laurentiis (granddaughter)

Agostino "Dino" De Laurentiis (Italian: [ˈdiːno de lauˈrɛnti.is]; 8 August 1919 – 10 November 2010) was an Italian and American film producer and businessman. Following a brief acting career in the late 1930s and early 1940s, he moved into film production; alongside Carlo Ponti, he brought Italian cinema to the international scene in the post-World War II period.

De Laurentiis produced or co-produced over 500 films, with 38 of his Hollywood films receiving Academy Award nominations. He was also the creator and operator of DDL Foodshow, a chain of Italian specialty foods stores.

== Early life ==
Agostino De Laurentiis was born in Torre Annunziata, Kingdom of Italy, on 8 August 1919. He grew up selling spaghetti made by his father's pasta factory. His older brother, Luigi De Laurentiis (1917–1992), later followed him into film production. He studied at the Centro Sperimentale di Cinematografia in 1937 and 1938, but his studies were interrupted by the outbreak of World War II.

== Film career ==
De Laurentiis produced his first film, L'ultimo Combattimento, in 1941. His company, the Dino de Laurentiis Cinematografica, moved into film production in 1946. In the early years, De Laurentiis produced Italian neorealist films such as Bitter Rice (1949) and the early Fellini works La Strada (1954) and Nights of Cabiria (1956), often in collaboration with producer Carlo Ponti.

In the 1960s, De Laurentiis built his own studio facilities. He produced such films as Barabbas (1961), a Christian religious epic; The Bible: In the Beginning... (1966); Kiss the Girls and Make Them Die (1966), a spoof of the James Bond films; Navajo Joe (1966), a spaghetti Western; Anzio (1968), a World War II film; Barbarella (1968) and Danger: Diabolik (1968), both successful comic book adaptations; and The Valachi Papers (1972), released before its originally scheduled date in order to capitalize on the popularity of The Godfather. The company had its first-look deal in North America with Paramount Pictures to distribute most of the company's productions since the 1950s.

In 1973, De Laurentiis relocated his headquarters to New York and he was reportedly considering to produce an American television series. His studio financially collapsed during the 1970s. In the 1980s, he had his own studio: De Laurentiis Entertainment Group (DEG) based in Wilmington, North Carolina. The studio made Wilmington an unexpected center of film and television production. After DEG collapsed, he then founded The Film & Television Company. In 1990, he obtained backing from an Italian friend and formed another company: Dino De Laurentiis Communications in Beverly Hills. Also in late 1990, the company signed a two-picture deal with Universal Pictures to distribute the company's productions.

De Laurentiis produced a number of successful films, including The Scientific Cardplayer (1972), Serpico (1973), Death Wish (1974), Mandingo (1975), Three Days of the Condor (1975), The Shootist (1976), Drum (1976), Ingmar Bergman's The Serpent's Egg (1977), Ragtime (1981), Conan the Barbarian (1982), Blue Velvet (1986) and Breakdown (1997). De Laurentiis' name became well known through the 1976 King Kong remake, which was a commercial hit; Lipstick (1976), a rape and revenge drama; Orca (1977), a killer whale film; The White Buffalo (1977), a western; the disaster movie Hurricane (1979); the remake of Flash Gordon (1980); David Lynch's Dune (1984); The Bounty (1984); and King Kong Lives (1986).

De Laurentiis produced several adaptations of Stephen King works, including The Dead Zone (1983), Cat's Eye (1985), Silver Bullet (1985), and Maximum Overdrive (1986). De Laurentiis' company was involved with the horror sequels Halloween II (1981), Evil Dead II (1987), and Army of Darkness (1992). De Laurentiis also produced the first Hannibal Lecter film, Manhunter (1986), an adaptation of the Thomas Harris novel Red Dragon. He passed on adapting the novels' sequel, The Silence of the Lambs (1991), but produced the two follow-ups, Hannibal (2001) and Red Dragon (2002), a re-adaptation of the novel. He also produced the prequel Hannibal Rising (2007), which tells the story of how Hannibal becomes a serial killer.

== DDL Foodshow ==
DDL Foodshow was an Italian specialty foods store with three locations: two in New York City and one in Beverly Hills. They were opened in the mid-1980s, and were owned and operated by De Laurentiis.

The first store was opened in the restored palm court in the ornate lobby of the historic Endicott Hotel, now a co-op on Manhattan's Upper West Side, near the existing Zabar's food emporium on Broadway. The first NYC store opened in November 1982, and it was reported that the store "opened to crowds of 30,000 over the Thanksgiving weekend, when de Laurentiis himself greeted customers at the door". The store's assistant manager said that "it was like the premiere of a movie".

The food critic Gael Greene wrote a scathing review on the opening in New York. In an interview with the Chicago Tribune a month later, she admitted that the store was "probably the most stunningly handsome grocery in the world, certainly in New York", but "the pricing was insane. They hadn't paid enough attention to the competition." She reported that she'd talked to De Laurentiis: "Dino's reaction was that I'm full of it. And we're meeting over a bowl of pasta to discuss it." A review in The San Francisco Examiner said that it was "worth a peek and a purchase".

The stores closed less than two years after opening, due in part to the poor reviews and lower sales than expected. When the stores first opened, de Laurentiis had estimated that the Upper West Side location would need to take in $75,000 to $80,000 a week to break even; after the closing, he stated that the store had never turned a profit. Restauranteur Hans W. Pauli, who took over the space, renamed it and cut the staff from 100 to 30; he stated that it would have actually taken "closer to $200,000 a week" to break even.

== Personal life ==
De Laurentiis' brief first marriage in Italy was annulled.

In 1949, De Laurentiis married Italian-British actress Silvana Mangano, with whom he had four children: Veronica, an author and actress; Raffaella, a fellow film producer; Federico, also a film producer who died in a plane crash in 1981; and Francesca. His granddaughter through Veronica is chef Giada De Laurentiis, while his nephew through his brother Luigi is fellow film producer Aurelio De Laurentiis. He and Mangano divorced in 1988, and she died of lung cancer the following year.

Having lived in the U.S. since 1976, De Laurentiis became an American citizen in 1986.

In 1990, De Laurentiis married American producer Martha Schumacher, who had produced many of his films since 1985. They had two daughters named Carolyna and Dina and remained married until his death in 2010. Schumacher died of cancer in 2021.

=== Death ===
On 10 November 2010, at the age of 91, De Laurentiis died at his home in Beverly Hills, California.

== Awards and recognitions ==
In 1957, De Laurentiis and Carlo Ponti won the Academy Award for Best Foreign Language Film for producing La Strada (1954). This was a unique occasion when the producers' names were included in the nominations, and they, not the director Federico Fellini, received the award.

In 2001, De Laurentiis received the Irving G. Thalberg Memorial Award from the Academy of Motion Picture Arts and Sciences.

In 2012, he was posthumously honored with the America Award by the Italy–USA Foundation.

== Filmography ==
=== Producer ===
Year	Title	Director(s)
1946	Black Eagle	Riccardo Freda
1946	The Bandit	Alberto Lattuada
1947	The Captain's Daughter	Mario Camerini
1947	Bullet for Stefano	Duilio Coletti
1948	Bitter Rice	Giuseppe De Santis
1948	The Street Has Many Dreams	Mario Camerini
1949	The Wolf of the Sila	Duilio Coletti
1950	I'm in the Revue	Mario Soldati
1951	Anna	Alberto Lattuada
1952	Europe '51	Roberto Rossellini
1952	Lieutenant Giorgio	Raffaello Matarazzo
1952	Toto in Color	Steno
1953	Funniest Show on Earth	Mario Mattoli
1953	The Unfaithfuls	Mario Monicelli
1953	Man, Beast and Virtue	Steno
1954	La Strada	Federico Fellini
1954	Attila	Pietro Francisci
1954	Woman of Rome	Luigi Zampa
1954	The Gold of Naples	Vittorio De Sica
1954	Where Is Freedom?	Roberto Rossellini
1954	A Slice of Life	Alessandro Blasetti; Paul Paviot
1954	An American in Rome	Steno
1954	Ulysses	Mario Camerini
1955	The River Girl	Mario Soldati
1955	Mambo	Robert Rossen
1955	The Miller's Beautiful Wife	Mario Camerini
1956	War and Peace	King Vidor
1956	Nights of Cabiria	Federico Fellini
1958	This Angry Age	René Clément
1958	Tempest	Alberto Lattuada
1959	The Great War	Mario Monicelli
1960	Everybody Go Home	Luigi Comencini
1960	Five Branded Women	Martin Ritt
1960	Under Ten Flags	Duilio Coletti
1960	Crimen	Mario Camerini
1960	The Hunchback of Rome	Carlo Lizzani
1961	The Last Judgment	Vittorio De Sica
1961	A Difficult Life	Dino Risi
1961	Black City	Duilio Coletti
1962	The Italian Brigands	Mario Camerini
1963	Il Boom	Vittorio De Sica
1963	The Verona Trial	Carlo Lizzani
1964	My Wife	Luigi Comencini; Mauro Bolognini; Tinto Brass
1966	The Bible: In the Beginning	John Huston
1966	Kiss the Girls and Make Them Die	Henry Levin
1966	Navajo Joe	Sergio Corbucci
1967	The Stranger	Luchino Visconti
1967	Matchless	Alberto Lattuada
1967	The Witches	Luchino Visconti; Mauro Bolognini; Pier Paolo Pasolini; Franco Rossi; Vittorio De Sica
1968	Danger: Diabolik	Mario Bava
1968	Barbarella	Roger Vadim
1968	Anzio	Edward Dmytryk; Duilio Coletti
1968	Bandits in Milan	Carlo Lizzani
1968	Caprice Italian Style	Mauro Bolognini; Mario Monicelli; Pier Paolo Pasolini; Steno
1969	Fräulein Doktor	Alberto Lattuada
1969	Brief Season	Renato Castellani
1969	The Bandit	Carlo Lizzani
1970	A Man Called Sledge	Vic Morrow
1970	Waterloo	Sergei Bondarchuk
1970	The Deserter	Burt Kennedy
1972	The Valachi Papers	Terence Young
1972	The Assassin of Rome	Damiano Damiani
1972	The Most Wonderful Evening of My Life	Ettore Scola
1973	Mean Frank and Crazy Tony	Michele Lupo
1974	Two Missionaries	Franco Rossi
1974	Crazy Joe	Carlo Lizzani
1974	Three Tough Guys	Duccio Tessari
1975	Mandingo	Richard Fleischer
1976	King Kong	John Guillermin
1976	The Serpent's Egg	Ingmar Bergman
1976	The Shootist	Don Siegel
1979	Hurricane	Jan Troell
1980	Flash Gordon	Mike Hodges
1981	Ragtime	Miloš Forman
1985	Marie	Roger Donaldson
1985	Cat's Eye	Lewis Teague
1985	Year of the Dragon	Michael Cimino
1985	Red Sonja	Richard Fleischer
1987	Million Dollar Mystery	Richard Fleischer
1987	Hiding Out	Bob Giraldi
1987	Evil Dead II	Sam Raimi
1987	The Bedroom Window	Curtis Hanson
1987	From the Hip	Bob Clark
1989	Collision Course	Lewis Teague
1990	Sometimes They Come Back	Tom McLoughlin
1990	Desperate Hours	Michael Cimino
1992	Once Upon a Crime	Eugene Levy
1992	Kuffs	Bruce A. Evans
1992	Body of Evidence	Uli Edel
1995	Solomon & Sheba	Robert Young
1995	Slave of Dreams	Robert Young
1996	Unforgettable	John Dahl
1997	Breakdown	Jonathan Mostow
2000	U-571	Jonathan Mostow
2001	Hannibal	Ridley Scott
2002	Red Dragon	Brett Ratner
2007	Hannibal Rising	Peter Webber
2007	Virgin Territory	David Leland

=== Executive producer ===
Year	Title	Director
1961	Goliath and the Vampires	Sergio Corbucci; Giacomo Gentilomo
1961	The Best of Enemies	Guy Hamilton
1961	Io amo, tu ami	Alessandro Blasetti
1962	The Police Commissioner	Luigi Comencini
1962	Mafioso	Alberto Lattuada
1973	Serpico	Sidney Lumet
1976	Buffalo Bill and the Indians, or Sitting Bull's History Lesson	Robert Altman
1978	The First Great Train Robbery	Michael Crichton
1978	King of the Gypsies	Frank Pierson
1984	The Bounty	Roger Donaldson
1986	Raw Deal	John Irvin
1986	Maximum Overdrive	Stephen King
1986	Tai-Pan	Daryl Duke
1992	Army of Darkness	Sam Raimi
1995	Assassins	Richard Donner

=== Uncredited ===
Year	Title	Director
1954	Poverty and Nobility	Mario Mattoli
1956	Toto, Peppino, and the Hussy	Camillo Mastrocinque
1957	Guendalina	Alberto Lattuada
1960	Toto, Fabrizi and the Young People Today	Mario Mattoli
1961	The Fascist	Luciano Salce
1961	Totòtruffa 62	Camillo Mastrocinque
1963	The Hours of Love	Luciano Salce
1965	Battle of the Bulge	Ken Annakin
1965	Pierrot le Fou	Jean-Luc Godard
1966	The Hills Run Red	Carlo Lizzani
1973	Chino	John Sturges
1974	Death Wish	Michael Winner
1975	Three Days of the Condor	Sydney Pollack
1976	Lipstick	Lamont Johnson
1977	The White Buffalo	J. Lee Thompson
1977	Orca	Michael Anderson
1978	The Brink's Job	William Friedkin
1979	Beyond the Reef	Frank C. Clarke
1981	Halloween II	Rick Rosenthal
1982	Conan the Barbarian	John Milius
1982	Fighting Back	Lewis Teague
1982	Amityville II: The Possession	Damiano Damiani
1982	Halloween III: Season of the Witch	Tommy Lee Wallace
1983	The Dead Zone	David Cronenberg
1983	Amityville 3-D	Richard Fleischer
1984	Firestarter	Mark L. Lester
1984	Conan the Destroyer	Richard Fleischer
1984	Dune	David Lynch
1985	Silver Bullet	Daniel Attias
1986	Pirates	Roman Polanski
1986	Manhunter	Michael Mann
1986	Blue Velvet	David Lynch
1986	Crimes of the Heart	Bruce Beresford
1986	King Kong Lives	John Guillermin
1989	Leviathan	George P. Cosmatos
1990	The Rift	Juan Piquer Simón
1996	Bound	The Wachowskis
2006	The Last Legion	Doug Lefler
