= Silvana Mangano =

Italian actress (1930–1989)

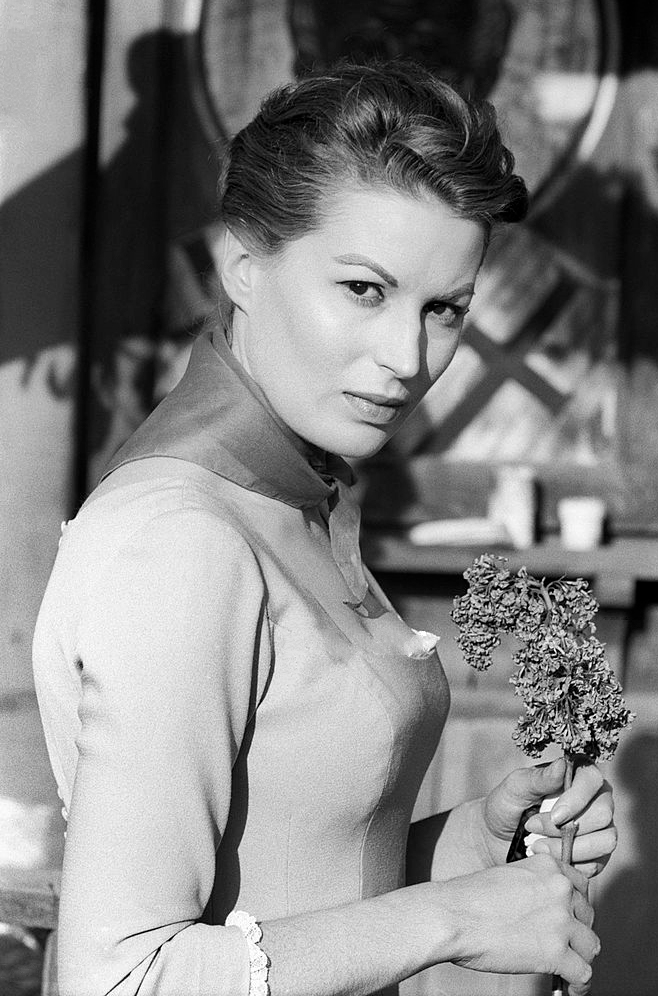
- Mangano in 1958
- Born: 21 April 1930; Rome, Kingdom of Italy
- Died: 16 December 1989 (aged 59); Madrid, Spain
- Occupation: Actress
- Years active: 1945–1987
- Spouse: Dino De Laurentiis (m. 1949; div. 1988)
- Children: 4, including Veronica, Raffaella, and Federico
- Awards: David di Donatello for Best Actress; 1963: The Verona Trial; 1967: The Witches; 1972: The Scientific Cardplayer Nastro d'Argento for Best Actress; 1955: The Gold of Naples; 1964: The Verona Trial Nastro d'Argento for Best Supporting Actress; 1972: Death in Venice

Silvana Mangano (Italian pronunciation: [silˈvaːna ˈmaŋɡano]; 21 April 1930 – 16 December 1989) was an Italian film actress. She was one of a generation of actors who arose from the neorealist movement, and went on to become a major female star, regarded as a sex symbol for the 1950s and '60s. She won the David di Donatello for Best Actress three times – for The Verona Trial (1963), The Witches (1967), and The Scientific Cardplayer (1972) – and the Nastro d'Argento for Best Actress twice.

Raised in poverty during World War II, Mangano trained as a dancer and worked as a model before winning a Miss Rome beauty pageant in 1946. This led to work in films; she achieved success in Bitter Rice (1949) and went on to forge a successful career in films, working with many notable directors like Pier Paolo Pasolini, Luchino Visconti, Alberto Lattuada, and Vittorio De Sica. Her career continued well into her 50s, with supporting roles in David Lynch's Dune (1984) and Nikita Mikhalkov's Dark Eyes (1987).

Mangano was the wife of international film producer Dino De Laurentiis and had four children with him, including Veronica De Laurentiis and Raffaella De Laurentiis.

== Early life ==
Born in Rome to an Italian father and an English mother (Ivy Webb from Croydon), Mangano lived in poverty during World War II. Trained for seven years as a dancer, she supported herself as a model. In 1946, at age 16, Mangano won the Miss Rome beauty pageant, and through this, she obtained a role in a Mario Costa film. One year later, she became a contestant in the Miss Italia contest. The contest that year became a springboard for a pool of potential actresses, including the winner Lucia Bosé, Mangano, and several other future stars of Italian cinema such as Gina Lollobrigida, Eleonora Rossi Drago and Gianna Maria Canale.

== Career ==
Mangano's earliest connection with filmmaking occurred through her romantic relationship with actor Marcello Mastroianni. This led her to a film contract, though it took some time for Mangano to ascend to international stardom with her performance in Bitter Rice (Riso Amaro, Giuseppe De Santis, 1949). She signed a contract with Lux Film in 1949, and later married producer Dino De Laurentiis.

Although she never had an international career to match her contemporaries Sophia Loren and Gina Lollobrigida, Mangano remained a favorite star between the 1950s and 1970s, appearing in Anna (Alberto Lattuada, 1951), L'oro di Napoli (Vittorio De Sica, 1954), Mambo (Robert Rossen, 1955), Teorema (Pier Paolo Pasolini, 1968), Death in Venice (Luchino Visconti, 1971), The Scientific Cardplayer (Luigi Comencini, 1972), and Ludwig (Luchino Visconti, 1973). She played the lead role in the 1967 anthology film The Witches, which featured segments directed by Pasolini, Visconti, De Sica, and Mauro Bolognini. She collaborated four times with Pasolini and Visconti.

Over the course of her career, Mangano won the David di Donatello for Best Actress three times and the Nastro d'Argento for Best Actress twice. Her final film role was in Nikita Mikhalkov for Dark Eyes, for which received a Nastro d'Argento nomination for Best Supporting Actress. Although it was sung by Flo Sandon's, Silvana Mangano was credited on the record label of "El Negro Zumbón", which is from the soundtrack of the film Anna (1951) and was a hit song in 1953. A clip of the opening of this performance is featured in the film Cinema Paradiso (1988).

== Personal life ==
It is claimed that she had an affair with Mohammad Reza Shah of Iran during the late 1940s. Married to film producer Dino De Laurentiis from 1949, the couple had four children: Veronica, Raffaella, Francesca, and Federico. Veronica's daughter Giada De Laurentiis is the host of Everyday Italian and Giada at Home on the Food Network. Raffaella co-produced with her father on Mangano's penultimate film, Dune (David Lynch, 1984). Federico died in an airplane crash in 1981 in Alaska. De Laurentiis and Mangano separated in 1983, and Mangano began divorce proceedings in 1988.

Following surgery on 4 December 1989 that left her in a coma, Mangano died of lung cancer in Madrid, Spain, on 16 December 1989. Silvana Mangano is buried near New York City in Pawling cemetery next to her son Federico, who died in 1981, and brother Roy Rocco Mangano, who died in 1991.

== Legacy ==
In 2000, the city of Rome named a street in the Valleranello district after Mangano.

== Filmography ==
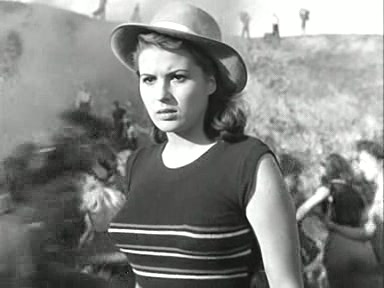
Mangano in Bitter Rice (1949)

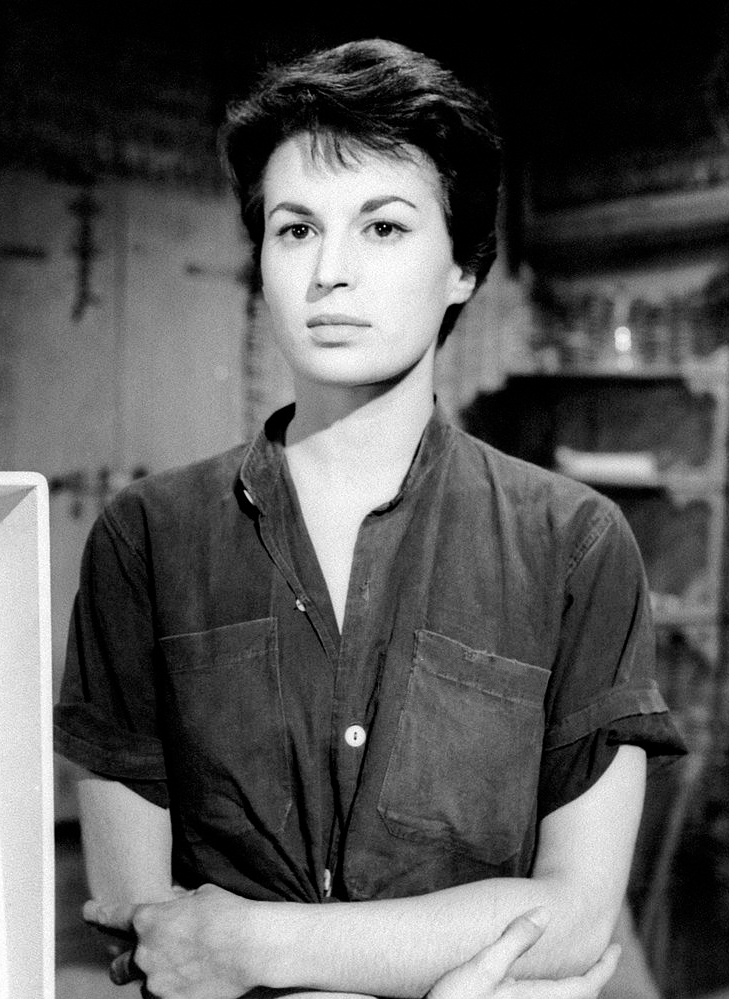
Mangano in This Angry Age (1957)

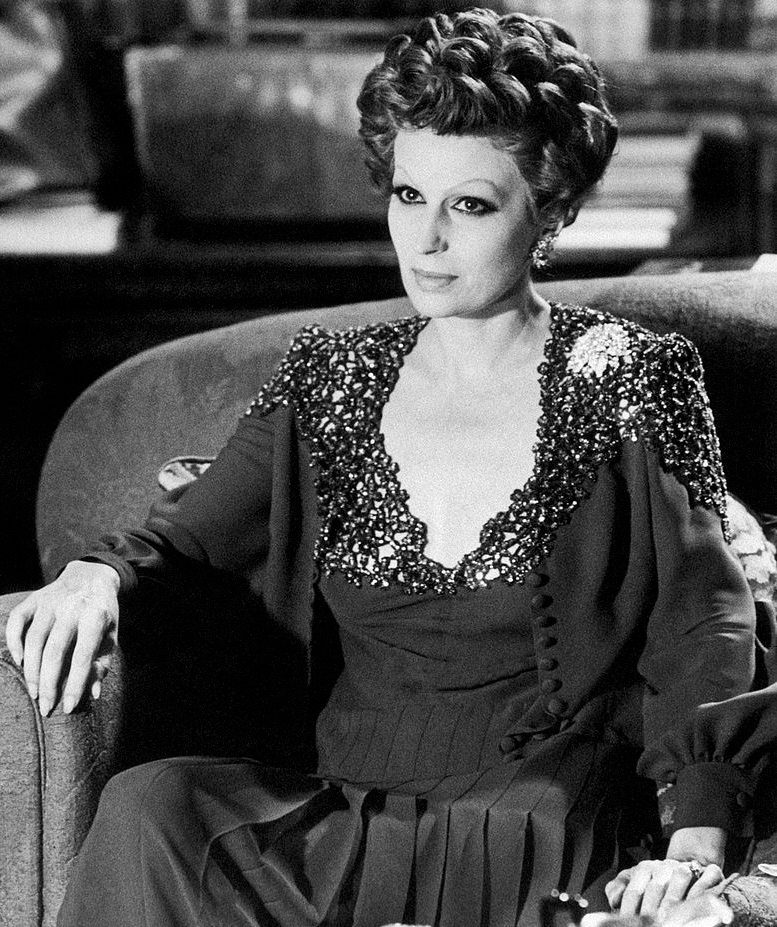
Mangano in Conversation Piece (1974)

Year	Title	Role	Director	Notes
1947	L'elisir d'amore	Adina's Girlfriend	Mario Costa	Uncredited
1947	Flesh Will Surrender	Ballerina at Party	Alberto Lattuada	Uncredited
1948	Mad About Opera	Woman at Carmen's	Mario Costa	Uncredited
1949	Black Magic	Bit part	Gregory Ratoff	Uncredited
1949	Bitter Rice	Silvana	Giuseppe De Santis	
1949	The Wolf of the Sila	Rosaria Campolo	Duilio Coletti	
1950	Il Brigante Musolino	Mara Russo	Mario Camerini	
1951	Anna	Sister Anna	Alberto Lattuada	
1954	Mambo	Giovanna Masetti	Robert Rossen	
1954	The Gold of Naples	Teresa	Vittorio De Sica	Nastro d'Argento for Best Actress
1954	Ulysses	Penelope / Circe	Mario Camerini	
1957	This Angry Age	Suzanne Dufresne	René Clément	Nominated- Nastro d'Argento for Best Actress
1957	The Wolves	Teresa	Giuseppe De Santis	Nominated- Nastro d'Argento for Best Actress
1958	Tempest	Masha	Alberto Lattuada	
1959	The Great War	Costantina	Mario Monicelli	
1960	Five Branded Women	Jovanka Jelisavac	Martin Ritt	
1960	Crimen	Marina Capretti	Mario Camerini	
1961	The Last Judgment	Signora Matteoni	Vittorio De Sica	
1961	Barabbas	Rachel	Richard Fleischer	
1963	The Verona Trial	Edda Ciano	Carlo Lizzani	David di Donatello for Best Actress; Nastro d'Argento for Best Actress
1964	My Wife	The Wife / Clara / Eritrea / Luciana	Luigi Comencini; Tinto Brass; Mauro Bolognini	
1964	Il disco volante	Vittoria Laconiglia	Tinto Brass	
1966	Me, Me, Me... and the Others	Silvia	Tinto Brass	
1966	Pardon, Are You For or Against?	Emanuela	Alberto Sordi	
1967	The Witches	Gloria / Woman in a Hurry / Assurdina Caì / Nunzia / Giovanna	Luchino Visconti; Mauro Bolognini; Pier Paolo Pasolini; Franco Rossi; Vittorio De Sica	David di Donatello for Best Actress
1967	Oedipus Rex	Jocasta	Pier Paolo Pasolini	
1968	Caprice Italian Style	Bambinaia	Mario Monicelli	
1968	Teorema	Lucia	Pier Paolo Pasolini	
1971	Death in Venice	Tadzio's Mother	Luchino Visconti	Nastro d'Argento for Best Supporting Actress
1971	Scipio the African	Aemilia Tertia	Luigi Magni	
1971	The Decameron	The Madonna	Pier Paolo Pasolini	Uncredited
1972	The Scientific Cardplayer	Antonia	Luigi Comencini	David di Donatello for Best Actress
1972	D'amore si muore	Elena	Carlo Carunchio	
1973	Ludwig	Cosima von Bülow	Luchino Visconti	Nominated- Nastro d'Argento for Best Supporting Actress
1974	Conversation Piece	Marchesa Bianca Brumonti	Luchino Visconti	Nominated- Nastro d'Argento for Best Actress
1984	Dune	Reverend Mother Ramallo	David Lynch	
1987	Dark Eyes	Elisa Patroni	Nikita Mikhalkov	Nominated- David di Donatello for Best Supporting Actress; Nominated- Nastro d'Argento for Best Supporting Actress
1988	Slugs	a diner in restaurant	Juan Piquer Simón	Uncredited
