= Madamigella di Maupin =

- Directed by: Mauro Bolognini
- Starring: Catherine Spaak
- Cinematography: Roberto Gerardi
- Music by: Franco Mannino
- Release date: 1966
- Language: Italian

Madamigella di Maupin is a 1966 Italian adventure film directed by Mauro Bolognini. It is loosely based on the life of Mademoiselle de Maupin and the novel with the same name by Théophile Gautier.

== Cast ==
- Catherine Spaak as Magdeleine de Maupin
- Robert Hossein as Capitain Alcibiade
- Tomas Milian as Cavaliere d'Albert
- Mikaela as Rosetta Durand
- Angel Alvarez as Monsieur de Maupin
- Ottavia Piccolo as Princess Ninon
- Manolo Zarzo as The Sergeant
