= Federico De Laurentiis =

Italian film producer (1955–1981)

- De Laurentiis in 1977
- Born: February 28, 1955; Rome, Lazio, Italy
- Died: July 15, 1981 (aged 26); Naknek, Alaska, U.S.
- Resting place: Pawling Rural Cemetery, New York, U.S.
- Occupation: Film producer
- Parents: Dino De Laurentiis (father); Silvana Mangano (mother)
- Relatives: Veronica De Laurentiis (sister); Raffaella De Laurentiis (sister); Luigi De Laurentiis (uncle); Giada De Laurentiis (niece); Aurelio De Laurentiis (cousin)

Federico De Laurentiis (February 28, 1955 – July 15, 1981) was an Italian film producer. He was the son of producer Dino De Laurentiis and actress Silvana Mangano. De Laurentiis was the executive producer of the film King Kong (1976) and he produced the films King of the Gypsies (1978) and She Dances Alone (1981). In 1981, De Laurentiis was killed in the mid-air collision of two light planes while he was shooting a documentary in Alaska.

== Life and career ==
Federico De Laurentiis was born in Rome on February 28, 1955. He was the son of film producer Dino De Laurentiis and actress Silvana Mangano. He had three sisters: Veronica De Laurentiis, Raffaella De Laurentiis and Francesca De Laurentiis. He was doted on by his father because he was the only boy in the family.

De Laurentiis attended the American Overseas School of Rome. He was a classmate of actress Blanche Baker. He dated Monica Saraceni, daughter of film producer Fausto Saraceni, in the early 1970s.

De Laurentiis began working with his father on film projects as a teenager. In 1973, it was reported that his father had relocated his headquarters to New York, and at 18 years old, he had joined him in the office as the vice president of television. He was an assistant to the producer in the films Three Days of the Condor (1975) and Mandingo (1975). He was then the executive producer of the film King Kong (1976), which was produced by his father. He was given full reign to produce the film King of the Gypsies (1978) and he later produced She Dances Alone (1981).

== Death ==
De Laurentiis was killed at age 26 in a plane crash over Kvichak Bay in Naknek while shooting a documentary on Alaska's annual fish harvest on July 15, 1981. In order to film the fishing fleet at work, his plane, a Cessna 185 with a camera on one wing, was flying low over the bay. The other aircraft, a Cessna 206 flown by a fish supplier, had just cleared a rise after lifting from the beach when they collided. The pilots of both planes were killed as well.

He is buried at Pawling Rural Cemetery in Pawling, New York.

The film Dune (1984), which his father produced, was dedicated to him.
