= My Wife (1964 film) =

- Directed by: Mauro Bolognini; Luigi Comencini; Tinto Brass
- Screenplay by: Alberto Bevilacqua; Marcello Fondato
- Story by: Rodolfo Sonego
- Produced by: Dino De Laurentiis
- Starring: Alberto Sordi; Silvana Mangano; Claudio Gora; Elena Nicolai
- Edited by: Nino Baragli
- Music by: Armando Trovajoli
- Release date: 1964
- Running time: 100 minutes
- Country: Italy
- Language: Italian

La mia signora (internationally released as My Wife) is a 1964 Italian comedy film directed by Tinto Brass, Mauro Bolognini and Luigi Comencini.

It consists of five episodes, all starring Alberto Sordi and Silvana Mangano.

The episode Eritrea, directed by Comencini, was later remade by Sergio Corbucci as the film Rimini Rimini (1987).

== Cast ==
- Alberto Sordi - The husband
- Silvana Mangano - The wife
- Claudio Gora - The Honourable
- Elena Nicolai - The mother-in-law
- Laura Durell - The hostess
- Marisa Fiorio - Roberta
