= Mambo (film) =

1954 film by Robert Rossen

- Directed by: Robert Rossen
- Written by: Ennio De Concini; Ivo Perilli; Guido Piovene; Robert Rossen
- Produced by: Dino De Laurentiis; Carlo Ponti
- Starring: Silvana Mangano; Michael Rennie; Vittorio Gassman
- Cinematography: Harold Rosson
- Edited by: Adriana Novelli
- Music by: Angelo Francesco Lavagnino; Nino Rota
- Production company: Ponti-De Laurentiis Cinematografica
- Distributed by: Ponti-De Laurentiis Cinematografica; Paramount Pictures (US)
- Release date: 18 September 1954 (Italy)
- Running time: 110 minutes
- Countries: Italy; United States
- Language: English

Mambo is an Italian/American psychological drama international co-production film, produced by Dino De Laurentiis, Carlo Ponti and Paramount Pictures written and directed from 1952 to 1953 by Robert Rossen and released in 1955. A mambo craze spread through the US in the 1950s, and Rossen aimed to repair his finances after almost two years without work since his 1951 House Un-American Activities Committee hearing. The film co-stars Silvana Mangano and Katherine Dunham who acted as the film's choreographer.

== Plot ==
Giovanna Masetti (Mangano), a poor Venetian who is admired by the crafty croupier Mario Rossi (Gassman) and the rich count Enrico Marisoni (Rennie). Discovered by Toni Salerno (Winters), Giovanna lives out a dream to become a dancer and moves to Rome. She returns six months later to the competing affections of Mario and Enrico, resulting in a choice between the two and the dramatic finale.

== Cast ==
- Silvana Mangano as Giovanna Masetti
- Michael Rennie as Enrico Marisoni
- Vittorio Gassman as Mario Rossi
- Shelley Winters as Toni Salerno
- Katherine Dunham as Dance teacher
- Mary Clare as Contessa Marisoni
- Eduardo Ciannelli as Padre di Giovanna
- Julie Robinson as Marisa
- Walter Zappolini as Un ballerino
- Franco Caruso as Pio
- Giovanna Galletti as Valeria
- Cecilia Maris as Barbara
- Martitia Palmer as Lena Masetti
- Sergio Parlato as Eduardo

== Production ==
Pérez Prado's music was prominent in the film.

== Critical reception ==
Rossen later said, "Mambo was to be for fun only," but he "took it seriously, and it didn't come off." The New York Times found the plot contorted, the script long and incredible, and lead actress Silvana Mangano's performance laborious, but praised Rossen's skilfully created moods, some decadent and others melancholy. Alan Casty dismissed the film as a "mere job".

However, in 2001 Dorothea Fischer-Hornung concluded that the film achieved more than Rossen and contemporary critics realised. The lead, Italian shop-girl Giovanna, enrolls in a troupe led by real-time choreographer Katherine Dunham. The other three main characters in different ways try to dominate Giovanna, but she renounces one while the other two die violently. Giovanna returns to the troupe to devote herself to dance. In the first scene a sexually charged dance accompanies a character's intense pass at Giovanna. The rest of the first third of the film forms three stages of Giovanna's training: basic lessons in Durham's technique; Giovanna collapses; more advance training, using twirling and other movements to induce trances. While most contemporary critics considered the cinematography of the dance scenes "confusing" and "handled with no real flair", one described it as "briefly, seems like genius", replacing conventional straight shots with sudden cuts, mirroring and montage.

Variety wrote: "Story is near soap opera, and involves the trials of a girl who wants to be a dancer. She is torn between the pure love for a dying prince and the passionate embraces of an adventurer. For a while Giovanna (Silvana Mangano) is happy with the dance group led by Tony (Shelley Winters), and soon becomes star of the show. But despite her success on returning to her home town of Venice, she falls once more under the adventurer's (Vittorio Gassman) spell while turning down a marriage proposal by the prince (Michael Rennie)."

== See also ==
- List of American films of 1955
