= The Witches (1967 film) =

1967 anthology film

- Italian theatrical release poster
- Italian: Le streghe
- Directed by: Luchino Visconti; Mauro Bolognini; Pier Paolo Pasolini; Franco Rossi; Vittorio De Sica
- Written by: Giuseppe Patroni Griffi; Cesare Zavattini; Age & Scarpelli; Bernardino Zapponi; Pier Paolo Pasolini; Fabio Carpi; Enzo Muzzi
- Produced by: Dino De Laurentiis
- Starring: Silvana Mangano; Clint Eastwood; Annie Girardot; Totò; Alberto Sordi
- Cinematography: Giuseppe Rotunno
- Edited by: Mario Serandrei; Nino Baragli; Giorgio Serrallonga; Adriana Novelli
- Music by: Piero Piccioni; Ennio Morricone
- Production companies: Dino De Laurentiis Cinematografica; Les Productions Artistes Associés
- Distributed by: Dear Film (Italy); United Artists (international)
- Release dates: 22 February 1967 (Italy); 5 June 1968 (France)
- Running time: 110 minutes
- Countries: Italy; France
- Language: Italian

The Witches (Italian: Le streghe) is a 1967 commedia all'italiana anthology film produced by Dino De Laurentiis in 1965. It consists of five comic stories dealing with the roles of women in Italian society, directed by Luchino Visconti, Mauro Bolognini, Pier Paolo Pasolini, Franco Rossi and Vittorio De Sica. The film stars Silvana Mangano and features Clint Eastwood, Annie Girardot, Totò and Alberto Sordi. It was the last film starring Totò to be released in his lifetime.

== Plot ==
=== "The Witch Burned Alive" ===
Gloria, a famous actress, attends the 10th anniversary party of her friend Valeria and her unfaithful husband Paolo at the couple's home in Kitzbühel, Austria. Envied by the women and pursued by the men, including Paolo, Gloria passes out from drinking while performing a dance for the guests. Feigning concern, the female guests remove her headdress and false eyelashes while making catty remarks about her imperfections. Later, Gloria discovers that she is pregnant and telephones her husband/manager in New York, who does not support her desire to take a break from acting to have children, leading to an argument. She leaves nonchalantly the next day, besieged by paparazzi as she boards a helicopter.

=== "Civic Spirit" ===
Stuck in a traffic jam in Rome, a woman offers to drive a man injured in a car accident to the hospital. However, as the woman speeds through the city, passing various hospitals, it transpires that she merely used him to arrive at her destination more quickly. After the woman discards the man on the side of the road, he tries to walk but collapses from his injuries.

=== "The Earth Seen from the Moon" ===
A recent widower, Ciancicato Miao, and his orange-haired son, Baciù, wander the outskirts of Rome in search of the ideal woman to be the father's new wife and the son's new stepmother. After searching for a year, the two eventually stumble upon Assurdina Caì, a green-haired deaf-mute, and Ciancicato soon marries her. Ciancicato and Baciù take Assurdina to their house, a run-down shack, which she quickly transforms into a colourful, welcoming home.

To earn money to buy a larger house nearby, Ciancicato devises a scheme in which Assurdina fakes a suicide attempt by jumping from the Colosseum. A crowd gathers under the Colosseum and begins to take up a collection to save Assurdina, but she slips on a banana peel discarded by a couple of tourists and falls to her death; she is buried next to Ciancicato's late wife. When Assurdina returns as a ghost soon afterwards, Ciancicato and Baciù run away in fear, but after realising that she can still cook, clean and go to bed with Ciancicato, the two men rejoice. The story ends with the moral: "Being dead or alive is the same thing."

=== "The Sicilian Belle" ===
In a Sicilian village, a young woman named Nunzia tells her father that a man made an unwanted advance towards her. To avenge his daughter's honour, the father murders the man, only to trigger a feud between the two families that results in the revenge killings of Nunzia's male relatives, including her father, brother, cousin and uncle. Nunzia wails at the funeral, wondering how this bloodshed could have happened.

=== "An Evening Like the Others" ===
Frustrated housewife Giovanna is deeply dissatisfied with her ten-year marriage to Carlo, an American banker who is too preoccupied with work and does not appreciate or desire her like he once did. One evening at home, Giovanna indulges in a series of fantasy sequences in which she angrily expresses her frustrations, compels a desperate Carlo to compete for her affections with comic book characters (including Mandrake, Batman, Diabolik and Flash Gordon), shoots at him while donning a black vinyl dress and a spiked headdress, and angers him by revealing her many extramarital affairs.

In the final fantasy sequence, Giovanna imagines herself as a glamorous star, strutting down the street in an evolving series of haute couture and attracting a growing crowd of aroused businessmen while Carlo desperately calls out to her. She ultimately leads her male admirers to a massive arena in Rome, where she performs a striptease for the excited crowd, prompting Carlo to shoot himself in the head. Back in reality, Giovanna goes to sleep next to a snoring Carlo and whispers that she loves him.

== Cast ==
"The Witch Burned Alive"

- Silvana Mangano as Gloria
- Annie Girardot as Valeria
- Francisco Rabal as Paolo
- Massimo Girotti as sportsman
- Véronique Vendell as young girlfriend
- Elsa Albani as gossip
- Clara Calamai as ex-actress
- Marilù Tolo as waitress
- Nora Ricci as Gloria's secretary
- Dino Mele as Dino, the waiter
- Helmut Berger (as Helmut Steinbergher) as hotel page
- Bruno Filippini as singer
- Leslie French as industrialist

"Civic Spirit"

- Silvana Mangano as woman in a hurry
- Alberto Sordi as Elio Ferocci

"The Earth Seen from the Moon"

- Silvana Mangano as Assurdina Caì
- Totò as Ciancicato Miao
- Ninetto Davoli (as Nenetto Davoli) as Baciù Miao
- Laura Betti as male tourist
- Luigi Leoni as female tourist
- Mario Cipriani as priest (uncredited)

"The Sicilian Belle"

- Silvana Mangano as Nunzia
- Pietro Tordi as Nunzia's father (uncredited)

"An Evening Like the Others"

- Silvana Mangano as Giovanna
- Clint Eastwood as Carlo (Charlie in the English version)
- Valentino Macchi as man at stadium
- Corinne Fontaine as admirer
- Armando Bottin as Nembo Kid
- Gianni Gori as Diabolik
- Paolo Gozlino as Mandrake
- Franco Moruzzi as Sadik
- Angelo Santi as Flash Gordon
- Pietro Torrisi as Batman

== Crew ==
"The Witch Burned Alive"

| Director | Luchino Visconti |
| Story and screenplay | Giuseppe Patroni Griffi; With the collaboration of Cesare Zavattini |
| Composer | Piero Piccioni |
| Assistant director | Rinaldo Ricci |
| Editor | Mario Serandrei |

"Civic Spirit"

| Director | Mauro Bolognini |
| Story and screenplay | Age & Scarpelli; Bernardino Zapponi |
| Composer | Piero Piccioni |
| Assistant director | Massimo Castellani |
| Editor | Nino Baragli |

"The Earth Seen from the Moon"

| Director | Pier Paolo Pasolini |
| Story and screenplay | Pier Paolo Pasolini |
| Composer | Ennio Morricone |
| Assistant director | Sergio Citti |
| Editor | Nino Baragli |

"The Sicilian Belle"

| Director | Franco Rossi |
| Story and screenplay | Age & Scarpelli; Bernardino Zapponi |
| Composer | Piero Piccioni |
| Assistant director | Nello Vanin |
| Editor | Giorgio Serralonga |

"An Evening Like the Others"

| Director | Vittorio De Sica |
| Story and screenplay | Cesare Zavattini; With the collaboration of Fabio Carpi; Enzo Muzii (credited as Enzo Muzzi) |
| Composer | Piero Piccioni |
| Assistant director | Luisa Alessandri |
| Editor | Adriana Novelli |

== Release ==
The Witches was never released outside of Europe as United Artists bought the film when Clint Eastwood's career began to ascend. United Artists decided not to release it in theaters and instead kept it in its library vault to protect Eastwood's image. The film was eventually given a limited release in New York City on 12 March 1969 by Lopert Pictures Corporation. Arrow Academy released a 2K restoration of the film on Blu-ray on 30 January 2018.
