= Corruption (1963 film) =

- Directed by: Mauro Bolognini
- Cinematography: Leonida Barboni
- Edited by: Nino Baragli
- Music by: Giovanni Fusco
- Release date: 1963
- Language: Italian

Corruption (Italian: La corruzione) is a 1963 Italian drama film directed by Mauro Bolognini.

== Plot ==
A young man upon finishing college announces to his publisher father that he wants to become a priest. The father who wants his son to take over the family business does not like this idea at all. He proposes a yacht trip to his son that will give them the chance to spend a few days together and maybe find a middle ground. Dad also invites his mistress without telling his son.

During the trip there is a lot of sexual tension between the young man and the mistress. Despite the fact that she is his father's mistress the young man sleeps with her. The next day he asks for his father's forgiveness.

After the trip the young man visits the company where he comes across a bizarre incident. One of the employees who was falsely accused of embezzlement commits suicide. Seeing that his father was responsible for the suicide, the young man feels sick and decides he has no place in such a company.

Later on he meets his father's mistress who informs him that she was hired by his father to come along on the yacht trip. It was all a ploy by the father to corrupt his son and make him change his mind about the priesthood. The last scene shows the young man staring at a dancing crowd of carefree and handsome young people. He is no longer certain about himself.

== Themes ==
Main themes are upper middle class guilt, and conflict between the spiritual and the material world. Purity versus Decadence.

== Cast ==
- Alain Cuny as Leonardo Mattioli
- Rosanna Schiaffino as Adriana
- Jacques Perrin as Stefano, Leonardo's son
- Isa Miranda as Leonardo's wife
- Filippo Scelzo as a teacher
- Ennio Balbo as Morandi
