= Metello =

1970 film

- Film poster
- Directed by: Mauro Bolognini
- Written by: Luigi Bazzoni; Mauro Bolognini; Suso Cecchi d'Amico; Ugo Pirro; Vasco Pratolini
- Produced by: Gianni Hecht Lucari; Fausto Saraceni
- Starring: Massimo Ranieri
- Cinematography: Ennio Guarnieri
- Edited by: Nino Baragli
- Music by: Ennio Morricone
- Production company: Documento Film
- Release date: 16 April 1970
- Running time: 107 minutes
- Country: Italy
- Language: Italian

Metello is a 1970 Italian drama film directed by Mauro Bolognini. It was entered into the 1970 Cannes Film Festival. It starred Massimo Ranieri as the title character.

== Plot ==
During the end of the 19th century, young Metello decides to start a new life after the sudden loss of his parents. He meets a young girl, Ersilia. They get married and have a son. Metello becomes involved in a political activity at work and is arrested. He then lies that he won't be involved in the activity anymore, and as a result, has to flee town. He arrives at his new destination, and meets a middle-aged school teacher. He then has an affair with her, and as a result, she gives birth to his daughter. Towards the end of the film, Metello realizes that he really belongs back home with Ersilia.

== Cast ==
- Massimo Ranieri as Metello
- Ottavia Piccolo as Ersilia
- Frank Wolff as Betto
- Tina Aumont as Idina
- Lucia Bosé as Viola
- Pino Colizzi as Renzoli
- Mariano Rigillo as Olindo
- Luigi Diberti as Lippi
- Manuela Andrei as Adele Salani
- Corrado Gaipa as Badolati
- Adolfo Geri as Del Bueno
- Claudio Biava as Moretti
- Franco Balducci as Chellini
- Steffen Zacharias as Pallesi
- Renzo Montagnani as Poldo Salani
- Sergio Ciulli

== Awards ==
Massimo won the David di Donatello award for best actor, and Ottavia Piccolo won the award for Best Actress at the 1970 Cannes Film Festival.
