= Anna (1951 film) =

- German film poster
- Directed by: Alberto Lattuada
- Written by: Giuseppe Berto; Franco Brusati; Ivo Perilli; Dino Risi; Rodolfo Sonego
- Produced by: Dino De Laurentiis; Carlo Ponti
- Starring: Silvana Mangano; Raf Vallone; Vittorio Gassman; Gaby Morlay; Patrizia Mangano
- Cinematography: Otello Martelli
- Edited by: Gabriele Varriale
- Music by: Nino Rota
- Distributed by: Lux Film
- Release date: 20 December 1951
- Running time: 107 minutes
- Country: Italy
- Language: Italian

Anna is a 1951 Italian melodrama film directed by Alberto Lattuada and starring the same trio as Bitter Rice: Silvana Mangano as Anna, the sinner who becomes a nun, Raf Vallone as Andrea, the rich man who loves her, and Vittorio Gassman as Vittorio, the wicked waiter who sets Anna on a dangerous path.

Silvana Mangano's real sister, Patrizia Mangano, acts as Anna's sister in the film. Sophia Loren has a small uncredited role as a nightclub assistant. Future film directors Franco Brusati and Dino Risi co-wrote the script.

The film features the songs "Non Dimenticar" and "El Negro Zumbón", a baião popularised in the US as "Anna" and recorded much later by Pink Martini.

== Plot ==
A man (Vallone) suffers a car accident. He's taken to hospital, where Sister Anna (Mangano) takes care of him. The man is the reason Anna became a nun. She remembers the days she was leading a life of sin as a night club singer.

== Reception ==
Anna is one of the greatest box office successes of Italian cinema. "El Negro Zumbón" became a classic in Italy and Spain. Nanni Moretti paid a tribute in Dear Diary, in which the song is shown on a TV, and the opening of the song is featured in Cinema Paradiso.

== Dubbed voices ==
In the original Italian version, the voices of many actors in the film are dubbed:

- Silvana Mangano: Lydia Simoneschi
- Vittorio Gassman: Gualtiero De Angelis
- Raf Vallone: Mario Pisu
- Gaby Morlay: Tina Lattanzi
- Tina Lattanzi appears in the film as Andrea's mother, and she is dubbed by Giovanna Scotto.
- Other voices heard in this film are: Emilio Cigoli, Giuseppe Rinaldi, Rosetta Calavetta and Miranda Bonansea.
