= Mauro Bolognini =

Italian film and stage director

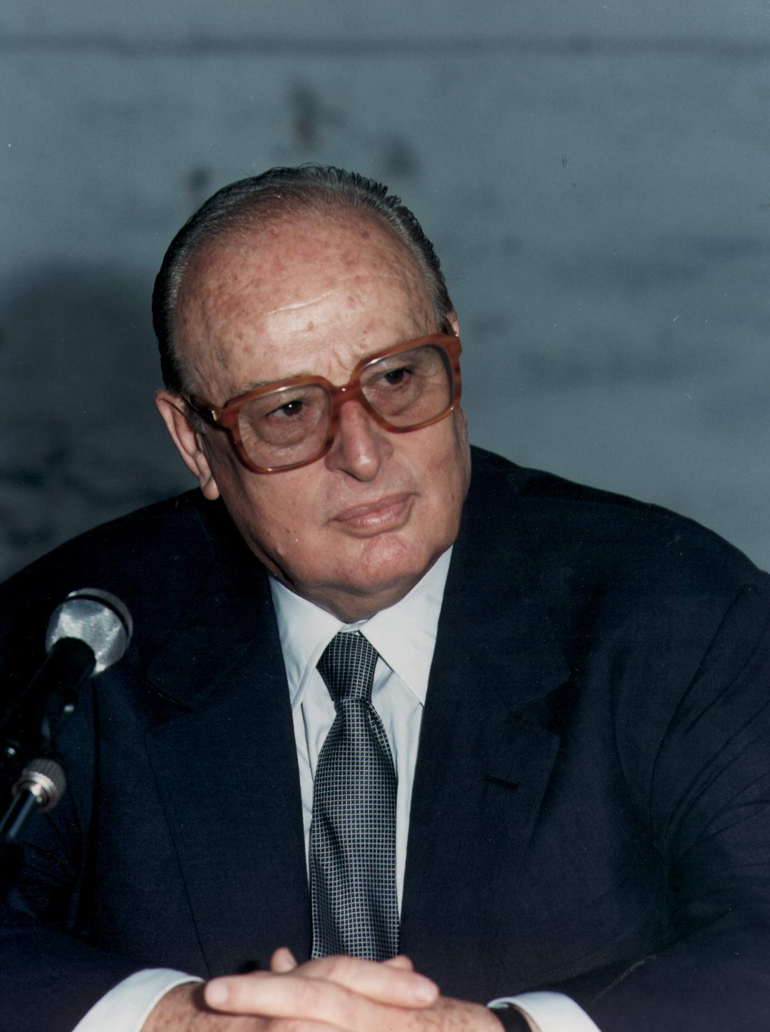
- Born: 28 June 1922; Pistoia, Kingdom of Italy
- Died: 14 May 2001 (aged 78); Rome, Italy
- Occupations: Film director; screenwriter; stage director
- Years active: 1953–1995

Mauro Bolognini (28 June 1922 – 14 May 2001) was an Italian film and stage director.

== Early years ==
Bolognini was born in Pistoia, in the Tuscany region of Italy. After earning a master's degree in architecture at the University of Florence, Bolognini enrolled at the Centro Sperimentale di Cinematografia (Italian National Film Academy) in Rome, where he studied stage design. After graduation, he became interested in film direction and set out to work as an assistant to directors Luigi Zampa in Italy, and Yves Allégret and Jean Delannoy in France.

== Film and television ==
Bolognini began directing his own feature films in the 1953 with the film Ci troviamo in galleria. He received his first international success with Wild Love (Gli innamorati). His other notable films of the 1950s and early 1960s include Young Husbands (Giovani mariti), The Big Night (La notte brava), From a Roman Balcony (La giornata balorda), and the Marcello Mastroianni-Claudia Cardinale starrer Il bell'Antonio (arguably his masterpiece), all written by Pier Paolo Pasolini.

Parting professionally with Pasolini in 1961, Bolognini directed two love stories starring Claudia Cardinale, The Lovemakers (La viaccia) and Careless (Senilità), and the coming-of-age films Agostino and Corruption (La corruzione) before turning his talents to a series of international anthology films, including The Dolls (Le bambole), Three Faces of a Woman (I tre volti), The Queens (Le fate) and The Witches (Le streghe).

Bolognini returned to features in 1966 with Madamigella di Maupin (Mademoiselle de Maupin) featuring Catherine Spaak and Robert Hossein. His films of the 1970s include the period dramas Metello and Bubù, both starring Massimo Ranieri, The Murri Affair (Fatti di gente perbene) starring Giancarlo Giannini and Catherine Deneuve and The Inheritance (L'eredità Ferramonti) with Anthony Quinn and Dominique Sanda.

In 1981, Bolognini filmed The Lady of the Camellias (La storia vera della signora delle camelie), inspired by the Alexandre Dumas, fils novel and play. Throughout the decade, he continued directing feature films, as well as the television miniseries The Charterhouse of Parma and A Time of Indifference. His final feature was the soft-core erotic drama Husband and Lovers (La villa del venerdì) starring Julian Sands and Joanna Pacula, released in 1991.

== Stage and opera ==
In the mid-1960s, Bolognini started to show an interest, as a stage director, in the production of operas and plays. His debut was in 1964 with Verdi's Ernani at the Teatro Massimo in Palermo, featuring tenor Mario Del Monaco. It was followed, in the same year, by Puccini's Tosca at the Teatro dell'Opera di Roma in Rome, and by many others, including: Vincenzo Bellini's Norma at La Scala in Milan (1972), and at the Bolshoi opera house in Moscow (1975); Verdi's Aida at La Fenice in Venice (1978); and Henze's Pollicino at the Poliziano opera house in Montepulciano (1995).

== Death ==
Bolognini died in Rome, Italy, in 2001, aged 78.

== Filmography ==
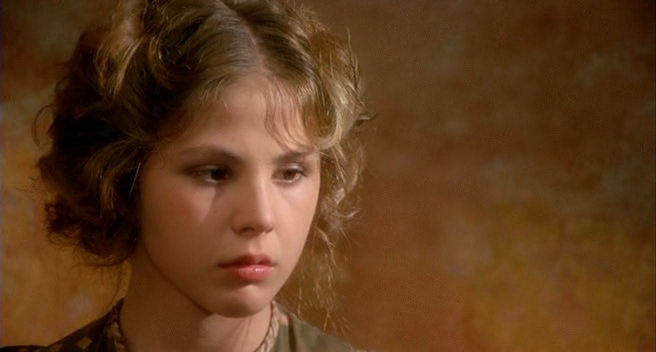
Ottavia Piccolo in Bubù (1971)

- Ci troviamo in galleria / We're in the Gallery (1953)
- Knights of the Queen (1954)
- La vena d'oro / Golden Vein (1955)
- Gli innamorati / Wild Love (1955)
- I tre moschettieri / The Three Musketeers (1956 - TV Series)
- Guardia, guardia scelta, brigadiere e maresciallo / Guard, Elite Guard, Brigadier and Marshall (1956)
- Marisa la civetta / Marisa (1957)
- Giovani mariti / Young Husbands (1958)
- Arrangiatevi! / You're On Your Own (1959)
- La notte brava / The Big Night / Bad Girls Don't Cry (1959)
- La giornata balorda / From a Roman Balcony (1960)
- Il bell'Antonio / Bell'Antonio (1960)
- La viaccia / The Lovemakers (1961)
- Agostino (1962)
- Senilità / Careless (1962)
- La corruzione / Corruption (1963)
- La mia signora / My Wife, segments "I miei cari" and "Luciana" (1964)
- La donna è una cosa meravigliosa / Woman Is a Wonderful Thing, segments "Una donna dolce, dolce" and "La balena bianca" (1964)
- Le bambole / Four Kinds of Love / The Dolls, segment "Monsignor Cupido" (1965)
- I tre volti / The Three Faces of a Woman, segment "Gli amanti celebri" (1965)
- Madamigella di Maupin / Mademoiselle de Maupin (1966)
- Le fate / The Queens / Sex Quartet, segment "Fata Elena" (1966)
- Le streghe / The Witches, segment Senso civico (1967)
- Le plus vieux métier du monde / The Oldest Profession, segment "Nuits romaines" (1967)
- Arabella (1967)
- Capriccio all'italiana / Caprice Italian Style, segments "Perché?" and "La gelosia" (1968)
- L'assoluto naturale / She and He (1969)
- Un bellissimo novembre / That Splendid November (1969)
- Metello (1970)
- Bubù (1971)
- Imputazione di omicidio per uno studente / Chronicle of a Homicide (1972)
- Libera, amore mio... / Libera, My Love... (1973)
- Fatti di gente perbene / The Murri Affair (1974)
- Per le antiche scale / Down the Ancient Staircase (1975)
- L'eredità Ferramonti / The Inheritance (1976)
- Gran bollito / Black Journal (1977)
- Dove vai in vacanza? / Where Are You Going on Holiday?, segment "Sarò tutta per te" (1978)
- La storia vera della signora dalle camelie / La Dame aux camélias / The Lady of the Camellias (1980)
- La Certosa di Parma / The Charterhouse of Parma (1981 - TV miniseries)
- La Venexiana / The Venetian Woman (1986)
- Mosca addio / Farewell Moscow (1987)
- Imago urbis / Image of the City (1987)
- Gli indifferenti / A Time Of Indifference (1988 - TV miniseries)
- 12 registi per 12 città / 12 Directors for 12 Cities, segment "Palermo" (1989)
- La villa del venerdì / Husband and Lovers (1992)
- La famiglia Ricordi / The Family Ricordi (1993 - TV miniseries)
