= Bubù =

- Directed by: Mauro Bolognini
- Starring: Massimo Ranieri
- Cinematography: Ennio Guarnieri
- Edited by: Nino Baragli
- Music by: Carlo Rustichelli
- Release date: 1971
- Country: Italy
- Language: Italian

Bubù (also known as Bubu) is a 1971 Italian historical drama film directed by Mauro Bolognini. The film is a transposition, set in Milan and Turin, of the novel Bubu de Montparnasse by Charles-Louis Philippe.

== Cast ==
- Massimo Ranieri: Piero
- Ottavia Piccolo: Berta
- Antonio Falsi: Bubu
- Gigi Proietti: Giulio, the thief
