= Tempest (1958 film) =

- Italian theatrical release poster
- Directed by: Alberto Lattuada
- Written by: Alexander Pushkin (novel); Ivo Perilli; Alberto Lattuada
- Produced by: Dino De Laurentiis
- Starring: Silvana Mangano; Van Heflin; Viveca Lindfors; Geoffrey Horne
- Cinematography: Aldo Tonti
- Edited by: Otello Colangeli; Henri Rust
- Music by: Piero Piccioni
- Distributed by: Paramount (US)
- Release date: 1 December 1958
- Running time: 120 minutes
- Countries: Italy; France; Yugoslavia
- Languages: Italian; English
- Budget: $2 million
- Box office: $1.5 million (est. US/ Canada rentals) $600,000 (Italy)

Tempest (Italian: La tempesta) is a 1958 Italian drama film directed by Alberto Lattuada and starring Silvana Mangano, Van Heflin, Viveca Lindfors and Geoffrey Horne.

== Plot ==
In the year 1770, in imperial Russia, a young lieutenant named Grinyov is caught drunk during a military inspection. As punishment, Empress Catherine II orders him to be reassigned to a remote part of the empire—the fortified village of Belogorsk.

On his journey to this distant outpost, Grinyov encounters a man caught in a snowstorm and saves his life. Unbeknownst to him, this man is Yemelyan Pugachev, a Cossack who will soon lead a major rebellion against the Russian Empire.

Upon arriving at the fortress, Grinyov is placed under the command of Captain Mironov, a kind and honorable officer. Mironov has a daughter named Masha, and Grinyov quickly falls in love with her. However, his affection for Masha leads to conflict with another officer at the post—Lieutenant Shvabrin—who is also in love with her.

Meanwhile, the threat of the Cossack uprising, led by the very man Grinyov once saved, draws nearer. As events unfold, Grinyov is forced to navigate complex challenges involving loyalty, love, and survival during a time of political turmoil and rebellion.

== Cast ==
- Silvana Mangano as Masha
- Van Heflin as Yemelyan Pugachev
- Viveca Lindfors as Catherine II
- Geoffrey Horne as Piotr Grinov
- Vittorio Gassman as Prosecutor
- Agnes Moorehead as Vassilissa Mironova
- Robert Keith as Capt. Mironov
- Oskar Homolka as Savelic
- Finlay Currie as Count Grinov
- Laurence Naismith as Maj. Zurin
- Helmut Dantine as Svabrin
- Fulvia Franco as Palaska
- Aldo Silvani as Pope Gerasim
- Claudio Gora as Minister of Caterine II
- Guido Celano as the farmer
- Cristina Gajoni as the young girl

== Production ==
The film was shot in Košutnjak film studios in Belgrade, Yugoslavia (today Serbia). . It is based on A History of Pugachev (1834) and the 1836 novel The Captain's Daughter, both by Alexander Pushkin.

The lead was given to Geoffrey Horne who had been in Bridge on the River Kwai. The success of the film in Europe led to him being cast in a series of European films.

== Reception ==
Variety said the film "shows the tremendous possibilities of well-planned co-productions. Both the action-spectacle public as well as the more discerning patron should go for this item, thanks to an expert balance struck between film’s epic qualities and the generally tasteful handling of the story line, script and dialog."

The film was a big box office hit in Italy. For this film Lattuada was awarded a David di Donatello for Best Director.
