= The Inheritance (1976 film) =

1976 film

- Film poster
- Directed by: Mauro Bolognini
- Written by: Sergio Bazzini; Roberto Bigazzi; Gaetano Carlo Chelli; Ugo Pirro
- Produced by: Gianni Hecht Lucari
- Starring: Anthony Quinn
- Cinematography: Ennio Guarnieri
- Edited by: Nino Baragli
- Music by: Ennio Morricone
- Release date: 21 October 1976
- Running time: 118 minutes
- Country: Italy
- Language: Italian

The Inheritance (Italian: L'eredità Ferramonti) is a 1976 Italian drama film directed by Mauro Bolognini. It was entered into the 1976 Cannes Film Festival, where Dominique Sanda won the award for Best Actress. Based on the eponymous novel by Gaetano Carlo Chelli and set among the huge changes taking place in Rome around 1880, it recounts the tale of an unhappy family riven by lust and greed.

== Plot ==
After 40 years of hard work, the widower Gregorio decides to sell the bakery business he has built up. He has no confidence in any of his three children, who all hate each other: Pippo is decent but weak, Mario is a gambler and womaniser, while the shrewish Teta is married to a pompous government employee. He therefore announces that none of them will inherit. Pippo marries the sweet and quiet Irene and ineffectually tries to run the ironmongery business of her old parents. She sets out to reconcile the three siblings with each other and with their obstinate old father. She wins over Mario, becoming his secret mistress, and even gains grudging co-operation from the abrasive Teta by their common interest in advancing themselves, not only financially but also socially to escape their origins as petty tradespeople. Irene next tackles the curmudgeonly Gregorio. She decides to take care of him and his house, looking after his diet and his health, and ends up in his bed. Happy at last, after many lonely years, he tells her he has changed his will to make her the sole heir and dies. Irene summons the family round to tell them what has happened. Pippo is lost in alcohol, Teta reacts with fury, but Mario is more deeply hurt and shoots himself. When Teta challenges the will in court, the decision is that the surviving children must share the inheritance.

== Cast ==
- Anthony Quinn - Gregorio Ferramonti
- Fabio Testi - Mario Ferramonti
- Dominique Sanda - Irene Carelli Ferramonti
- Gigi Proietti - Pippo Ferramonti (as Luigi Proietti)
- Adriana Asti - Teta Ferramonti Furlin
- Paolo Bonacelli - Paolo Furlin
- Rossella Rusconi - Flaviana Barbati
- Harold Bradley - Andrea Barbati (as Harald Bromley)
- Carlo Palmucci
- Silvia Cerio - Signora Minnelli
- Maria Russo - Rosa Carelli
- Simone Santo - Armando Carelli
- Rossana Di Lorenzo - Matilde

== See also ==
- List of Italian films of 1976
