= I'll Be Going Now =

- Directed by: Dino Risi
- Written by: Bernardino Zapponi; Dino Risi; Enrico Oldoini
- Produced by: Pio Angeletti; Adriano De Micheli
- Starring: Vittorio Gassman; Dominique Sanda; Elliott Gould
- Cinematography: Blasco Giurato
- Edited by: Alberto Gallitti
- Music by: Francis Lai
- Production companies: International Dean Film; Starlet Film
- Distributed by: United International Pictures
- Release date: 1990
- Running time: 100 minutes
- Country: Italy
- Language: Italian

Tolgo il disturbo, internationally released as I'll Be Going Now, is a 1990 Italian drama film directed by Dino Risi, which stars Vittorio Gassman, Dominique Sanda and Elliott Gould. It tells the story of a former bank manager who is released from an asylum after 18 years and the difficulties he has in reconnecting with what's left of his family.

== Plot ==
After 18 years in a psychiatric clinic, Augusto returns to his home in Rome under the care of his daughter-in-law Carla. Divorced long ago, she lives there with her lover Giorgio, his 12-year-old daughter, and Rosa, her 9-year-old daughter who is Augusto's grandchild. Bright, but lonely and bullied, she fast forms a bond with the grandfather she has never known.

Before he was committed, Augusto was manager of a large bank and when he drops in to pay some household bills he is recognised and welcomed. His former secretary offers to drive him home but in fact takes him to her flat, cooks him lunch, and then offers herself, upon which Augusto flees. Back in his house, Giorgio and Carla are hosting a drinks party for business associates when he wanders in looking for a magazine and insults a client of Giorgio's, who leaves in disgust. A guest is a psychiatrist who hosts a TV show, and she invites Augusto to appear on it.

In the bar before the show goes on the air he meets Alcide, an old roommate from the clinic who lives with a prostitute in a farmhouse outside the city. The two rudely disrupt the show, which is hastily pulled, but Carla and Giorgio were watching it at home and are further disturbed over his bad behaviour. At carnival time, the children of Rosa's school hold a party in fancy dress and Augusto goes to bring her home. As the two wander the streets, they encounter a homeless man and take him into a bar for a chat and a warming drink. After a glass of red wine, the already tired Rosa falls fast asleep and when much later Augusto carries her home he is attacked by Carla, who threatens him with re-committal.

To avoid this fate, he runs away to Alcide's farmhouse, leaving his address with Rosa. A few days later she joins him, having been threatened with dispatch to a faraway boarding school and missing the grandfather she has grown to love. After a police search for the missing man and child, the pair are traced and taken home. Rosa is sent off to the boarding school, while Augusto finds a room on his own. When he visits Rosa some months later, her love for her grandfather is still there but her affections are now centred on a handsome young cousin she has met. Augusto realises that she must grow into her own life and that he will have to remain on his own.

== Cast ==
- Vittorio Gassman: Augusto Scribani
- Elliott Gould: Alcide
- Dominique Sanda: Carla
- Eva Grimaldi: Ines
- Firmine Richard: Anita
- Monica Scattini: Margherita
- Valentina Holtkamp: Rosa
