= King of the Gypsies (film) =

1978 film by Frank Pierson

- Theatrical release poster by Sanford Kossin
- Directed by: Frank Pierson
- Written by: Peter Maas (book); Frank Pierson (screenplay)
- Produced by: Federico De Laurentiis
- Starring: Eric Roberts; Sterling Hayden; Judd Hirsch; Shelley Winters; Susan Sarandon; Brooke Shields; Danielle Brisebois; Annette O'Toole; Annie Potts
- Cinematography: Sven Nykvist
- Edited by: Paul Hirsch
- Music by: David Grisman, Stephane Grappelli
- Production company: Dino De Laurentiis Company
- Distributed by: Paramount Pictures
- Release date: December 20, 1978
- Running time: 112 minutes
- Country: United States
- Language: English
- Budget: $5–8 million
- Box office: $8 million (USA)

King of the Gypsies is a 1978 American drama film written and directed by Frank Pierson and based on the 1975 book of the same name by Peter Maas. It stars Eric Roberts (in his film debut), Sterling Hayden, Shelley Winters, Susan Sarandon, Brooke Shields, Annette O'Toole, and Judd Hirsch.

The film follows the life of Steve Tene and his Romani family.

== Plot ==
The film deals with the criminal ways and turbulent lives of a group of modern-day Romanis living in the early 1960s of New York City. While on his deathbed their "king", Zharko Stepanowicz, passes his position of leadership on to his unwilling grandson, Dave. In spite of Dave's reluctance to become the Gypsies' new leader, Dave's father, Groffo, resentful over not having been appointed leader, attempts to have Dave killed. Groffo is scheming and temperamental, and uses violence and threats to get the clan to do his bidding. Eventually this leads to a major confrontation with his son, and the film ends with the suggestion that Dave has finally accepted his legacy; with his voiceover considering the possibility of his bringing the rest of the tradition-bound Gypsies into the world of 20th Century customs and lifestyles.

== Cast ==
- Eric Roberts as Dave Stepanowicz
- Sterling Hayden as King Zharko Stepanowicz
- Judd Hirsch as Groffo Stepanowicz
- Shelley Winters as Queen Rachel Stepanowicz
- Susan Sarandon as Rose Giorgio Stepanowicz
- Brooke Shields as Tita Stepanowicz
  - Danielle Brisebois as Young Tita Stepanowicz
- Annette O'Toole as Sharon
- Annie Potts as Persa
- Michael V. Gazzo as Spiro Giorgio
- Antonia Rey as Danitza Giorgio
- Matthew Laborteaux as Middle Dave Stepanowicz
- Roy Brocksmith as Frinkuleschti
- Faith Minton as Gypsy (uncredited)

== Reception ==
On the review aggregator website Rotten Tomatoes, 67% of 9 critics' reviews are positive, with an average rating of 6.3/10.

== See also ==
- King of the Gypsies
- King of the Travellers
