= Dominique Sanda =

French actress (born 1951)

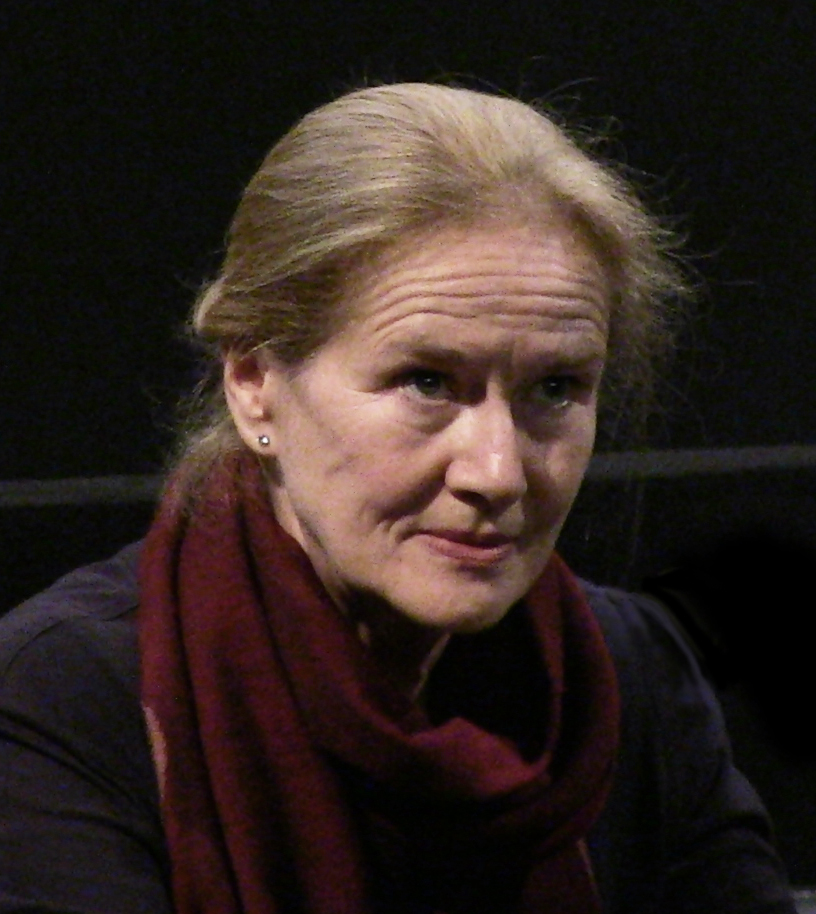
- Sanda at the Film Museum in Vienna in 2013
- Born: Dominique Marie-Françoise Renée Varaigne; 11 March 1951 (age 75); Paris, France
- Occupation: Actress
- Years active: 1969–present
- Spouse: Nicolae Cutzarida (m. 2000)
- Partner: Christian Marquand (1970s)
- Children: 1

Dominique Marie-Françoise Renée Varaigne (born 11 March 1951), professionally known as Dominique Sanda, is a French actress.

== Life and career ==
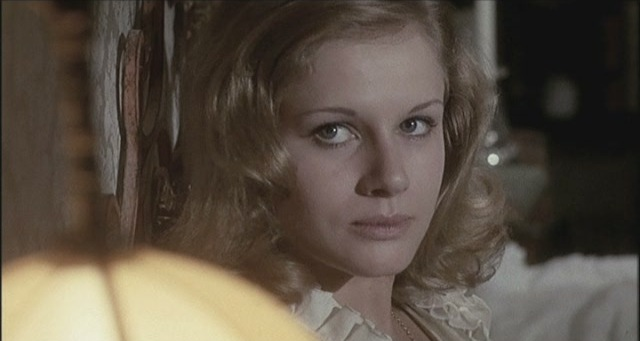
Sanda in The Garden of the Finzi-Continis (1970)

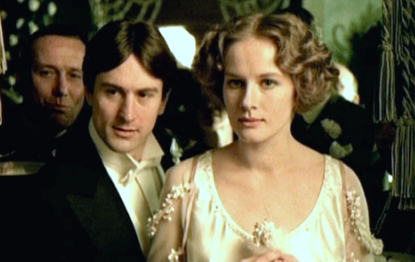
Sanda and Robert De Niro play a married couple, Alfredo and Ada in the 1976 film 1900

Sanda was born on 11 March 1951 in Paris, to Lucienne (née Pichon) and Gérard Varaigne. She appeared in such noted European films of the 1970s as Vittorio de Sica's Il Giardino dei Finzi-Contini, Bernardo Bertolucci's The Conformist and Novecento, and Liliana Cavani's Beyond Good and Evil. She also appeared in The Mackintosh Man (with Paul Newman) and Steppenwolf (with Max von Sydow).

Bernardo Bertolucci originally intended to cast Sanda in Last Tango in Paris; she developed the idea with him. He also wanted to cast Jean-Louis Trintignant. Trintignant refused and, when Marlon Brando accepted, Sanda was pregnant and decided not to do the film.

In the 1970s, she lived with actor/director Christian Marquand, with whom she had a son, Yann Marquand. She won the award for Best Actress at the 1976 Cannes Film Festival for her role in the film The Inheritance.

In 1993 at the Théâtre de la Commune, in Aubervilliers, France, she played Melitta in Madame Klein (Mrs. Klein by Nicolas Wright), directed by Brigitte Jaques-Wajeman. In 1995 in Italy, she played the Marquise de Merteuil in Les liaisons dangereuses, based on Choderlos de Laclos's novel, directed by Mario Monicelli. From 1995 to 1996 in France and Belgium, she has been Lady Chiltern in An Ideal Husband by Oscar Wilde, directed by Adrian Brine.

In 2000, she married Nicolae Cutzarida, an Argentine philosopher and university professor of Romanian origin. She lives in Uruguay and travels back and forth to Paris.

== Filmography ==
- Une femme douce (1969)
- La note dei fiori (1970)
- Il Conformista (1970)
- Erste Liebe (1970)
- Il Giardino dei Finzi-Contini (1970)
- Without Apparent Motive (1971)
- Story of a Love Story (1973)
- The Mackintosh Man (1973)
- Gruppo di famiglia in un interno (1974)
- Steppenwolf (1974)
- Le berceau de cristal (1975)
- 1900 (Novecento) (1976)
- L'eredità Ferramonti (The Inheritance) (1976)
- Beyond Good and Evil (1977)
- Damnation Alley (1977)
- Utopia (1978)
- La Chanson de Roland (1978)
- Le Navire Night (1979)
- Le Voyage en douce (Sentimental Journey) (1980)
- Caboblanco (1980)
- La Naissance du jour (1980)
- The Wings of the Dove (1981)
- L'Indiscrétion (1982)
- Une chambre en ville (1982)
- Poussière d'empire (1983)
- Le Matelot 512 (1984)
- Corps et biens (1986)
- Le Lunghe ombre (1987)
- Les Mendiants (1988)
- Il Decimo clandestino (1989)
- In una notte di chiaro di luna (1989)
- Voyage of Terror: The Achille Lauro Affair (1990)
- Tolgo il disturbo (1990)
- Voglia di vivere (1990)
- Lenin...The Train (1990)
- I, the Worst of All (1990)
- Birth of a Golem (1991)
- Ils n'avaient pas rendez-vous (1991)
- El Viaje (1992)
- Albert Savarus (1993)
- Rosenemil (1993)
- The Lucona Affair (1993)
- Der grüne Heinrich (1994)
- Guerriers et captives (1994)
- Brennendes Herz (1995)
- The Bible: Joseph (1995)
- L'Univers de Jacques Demy (1995)
- Garage Olimpo (1999)
- The Crimson Rivers (2000)
- The Island of the Mapmaker's Wife (2001)
- Going Away (2013)
- Saint Laurent (2014)
- Il giovane Pertini - Combattente per la libertà (2019)
- Karakol (2020)
- Il paradiso del pavone (2021)
