= Veronica De Laurentiis =

Italian author and actress

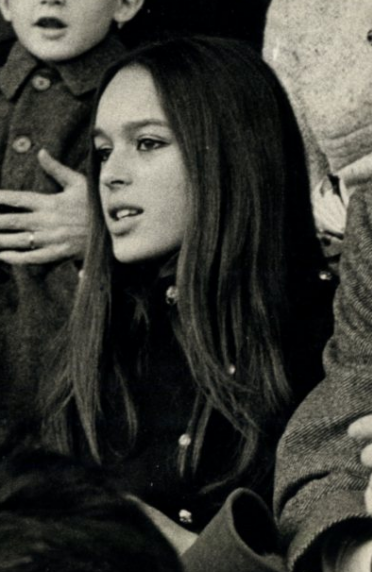
- Born: 13 January 1950 (age 76); Rome, Italy
- Occupations: Actress, author
- Years active: 1968–present
- Spouses: Alex De Benedetti (m. 1970; div. 1985): Ivan Kavalsky
- Children: 4, including Giada De Laurentiis
- Parents: Dino De Laurentiis; Silvana Mangano

Veronica De Laurentiis (born 13 January 1950) is an Italian-American author and actress. She is the daughter of Silvana Mangano and Dino De Laurentiis, and sister of film producer Raffaella De Laurentiis. At the age of eighteen, she was cast in the film Waterloo, starring Rod Steiger and Christopher Plummer. The film was produced by her father. She then retired from acting following the birth of her first child, Giada De Laurentiis, in 1970.

Shortly after her third child was born, she and her then-husband, Alex De Benedetti, left Italy for the United States. She has lived briefly in Florida and New York and for many years in Los Angeles.

Four years after the birth of her fourth child, she divorced. In order to support herself and her four children, she opened a fashion design studio where for 12 years she successfully designed women's clothing under her own label.

After remarrying, she closed her business and enrolled in a two-year intensive acting course. She is now a working actress and a best-selling author. Her memoir Rivoglio La Mia Vita (Claim My Life) was on the Italian bestseller list within a week. Veronica now tours Italy speaking openly about rape, abuse and the importance of breaking the silence as a tool for healing and change.

Her second book Riprenditi La Tua Vita — Le otto chiavi di Veronica (Take Back Your Life — Veronica's eight keys), was published in Italy May 2009.

She is the founder of the Associazione Veronica De Laurentiis, a foundation to stop domestic violence.

In March 2008, she was chosen to play the role of the "mater dolorosa" in the Italian show "D'Ambra Grigia E Canfora" directed by Raffaele Curi and produced by Fondazione Alda Fendi. In August of the same year, she starred in the movie Pandemia directed by Lucio Fiorentino which was released in 2012. She is also developing two television shows in Italy, a documentary and a one-woman show.

With her second husband, producer Ivan Kavalsky, she has homes in Los Angeles and Rome.

== Family ==
In addition to her first child, Giada, her other three children with Alex De Benedetti are Dino De Laurentiis (also a producer, like his grandfather), who died of melanoma in 2003, actor Igor De Laurentiis, and film makeup artist Eloisa De Laurentiis. She has appeared on occasion on Giada's cooking shows.
