= Ottavia Piccolo =

Italian actress (born 1949)

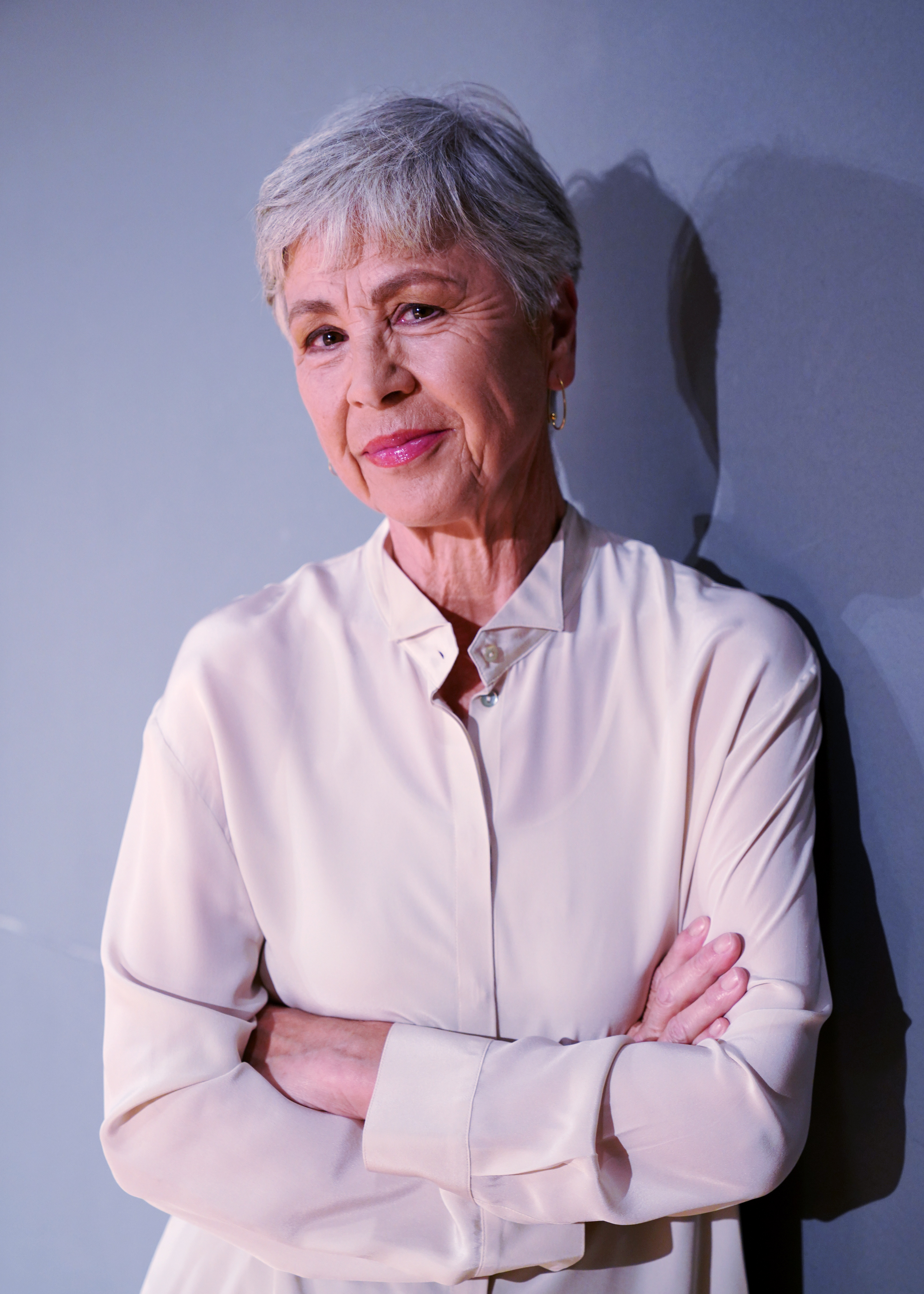
- Piccolo in 2020
- Born: 9 October 1949 (age 76); Bolzano, Italy
- Occupation: Actress
- Years active: 1962–present
- Political party: Socialist (1967–1994)
- Spouse: Claudio Rossoni (m. 1974)
- Children: 1

Ottavia Piccolo (born 9 October 1949) is an Italian actress.

== Biography ==
Born in Bolzano, Piccolo made her acting debut in the stage adaption of The Miracle Worker at the age of 11 under the direction of Luigi Squarzina. She has also appeared in 45 films since 1962, making her debut film appearance in the 1963 film The Leopard. In 1964, she met Giorgio Strehler, who directed the stage adaptations of Brawling in Chioggia and King Lear, both of which she appeared in. In 1970, she won the award for Best Actress at the 1970 Cannes Film Festival for the film Metello.

In addition to working in Italian cinema, Piccolo has also had some rare success in French cinema. She made her debut in the 1971 film The Widow Couderc directed by Pierre Granier-Deferre. Two years later, she appeared in The Edifying and Joyous Story of Colinot directed by Nina Companeez. She also appeared in several French television shows throughout the 1980s and 1990s. Piccolo returned to Italian television with the series Chiara e gli altri in which she portrayed Livia Malfatti. The show lasted only two seasons.

Piccolo has a rare career as a voice actress. She is internationally known for providing the Italian voice of Princess Leia Organa (portrayed by Carrie Fisher) in the Star Wars franchise. She was the only main cast member of the Italian dubbing of the original trilogy to reprise her character in the sequel trilogy as Stefano Satta Flores and Claudio Capone both died before the release of the sequel trilogy.

== Selected filmography ==
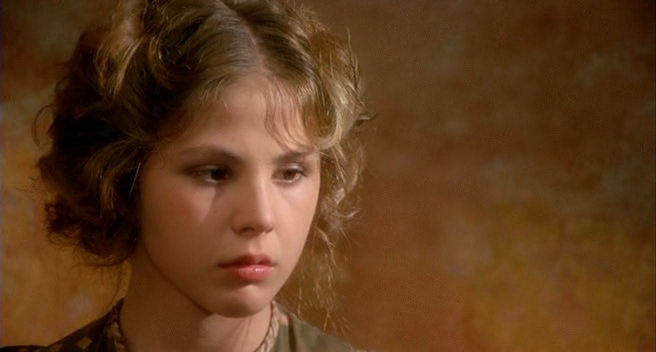
Piccolo in Bubù (1971)

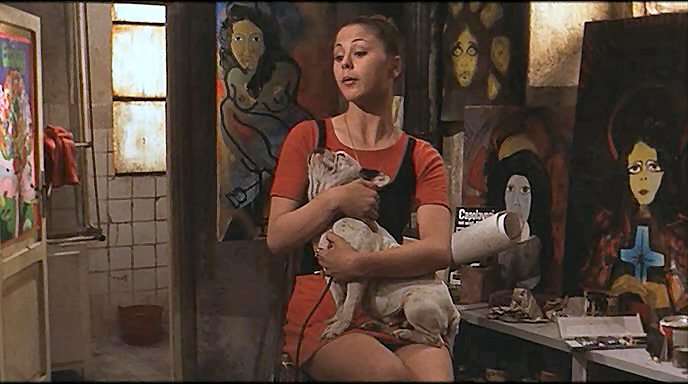
Piccolo in Trastevere (1971)

- The Leopard (1963)
- Serafino (1968)
- The Thirteen Chairs (1969)
- Metello (1970)
- Bubù (1971)
- Million Dollar Eel (1971)
- La Veuve Couderc (1971)
- Trastevere (1971)
- L'histoire très bonne et très joyeuse de Colinot trousse-chemise (1973)
- Antoine and Sebastian (1974)
- Zorro (1975)
- Mado (1976)
- La Certosa di Parma (1982, TV miniseries)
- Mino (1986, TV miniseries)
- The Family (1987)
- Da grande (1987)
- Condominio (1991)
- The Long Silence (1993)
- Bidoni (1995)
- Marching in Darkness (1996)
- Do You Know Claudia? (2004)
- A Good Season (2014, TV series)
- 7 Minutes (2016)
- Welcome Venice (2021)
