= Franco Committeri =

Italian film producer

- Born: 17 August 1924; Rome, Italy
- Died: 11 October 2001 (aged 77); Rome, Italy
- Occupation: Film producer

Franco Committeri (17 August 1924 – 11 October 2001) was an Italian film producer.

Born in Rome, Committeri started his career in the late 1950s as managing director of the film companies Istituto Luce and Cei Incom. In 1964 he became an independent producer, first founding the production company Jupiter and later establishing the company Massfilm. He produced almost all the films directed by Ettore Scola during this time, as well as works by Nino Manfredi, Luigi Magni, Elio Petri, Ugo Tognazzi and Marco Bellocchio.

During his career Committeri won several awards, including a David di Donatello in 1981 and a Silver Ribbon in 1987. He was also an occasional actor.

== Selected filmography ==
- Il generale dorme in piedi (1972)
- La Tosca (1973)
- Goodnight, Ladies and Gentlemen (1976)
- In the Name of the Pope King (1977)
- I viaggiatori della sera (1979)
- Passion of Love (1981)
- Portrait of a Woman, Nude (1981)
- Le Bal (1983)
- Cuori nella tormenta (1984)
- Macaroni (1985)
- The Family (1987)
- Sostiene Pereira (1995)
- Mario, Maria and Mario (1993)
- Romanzo di un giovane povero (1995)
- The Dinner (1998)
- Milonga (1999)
- Unfair Competition (2001)
