= Furio Scarpelli =

Italian screenwriter

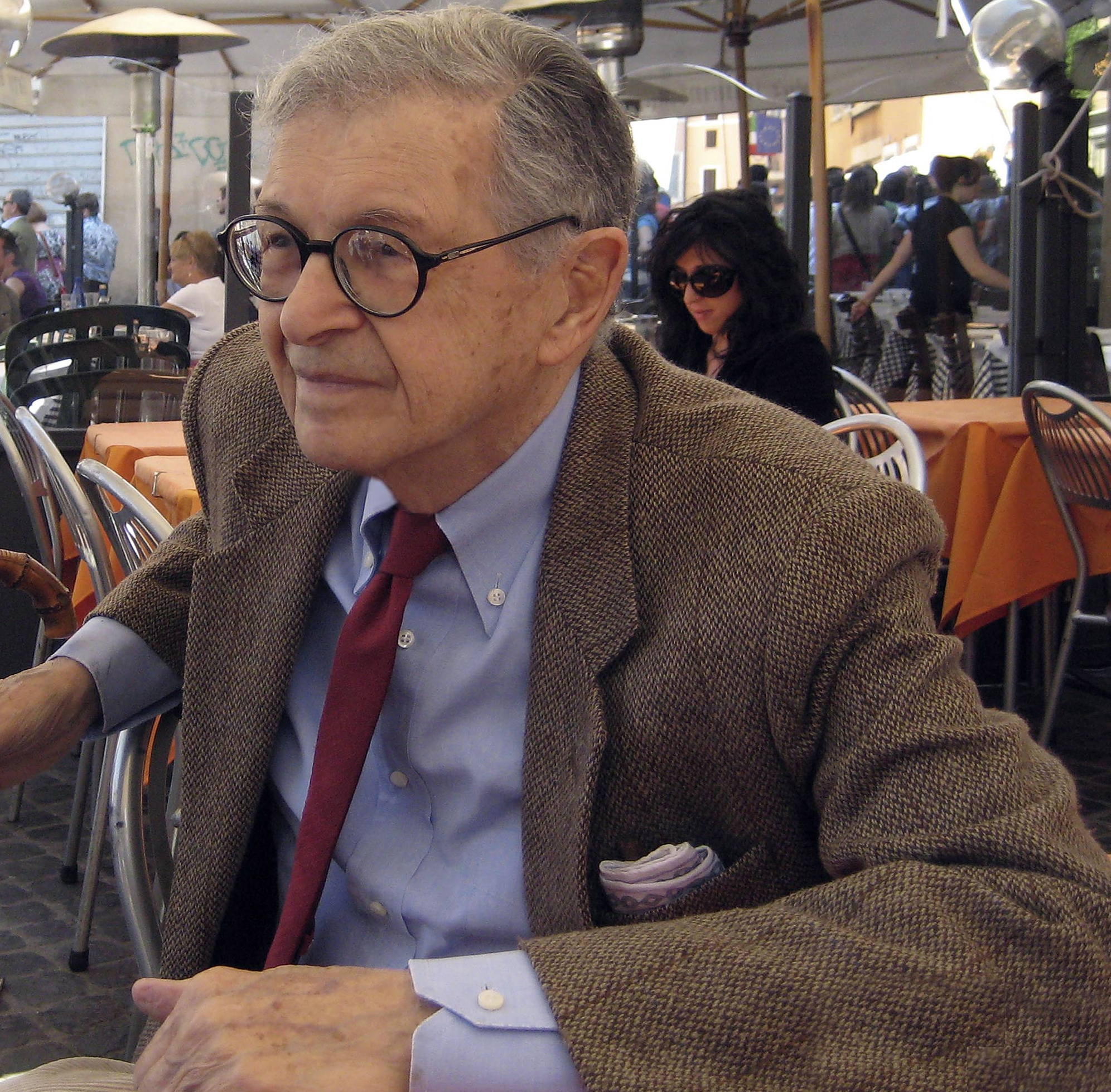

Furio Scarpelli (16 December 1919 – 28 April 2010), also called Scarpelli, was an Italian screenwriter, famous for his collaboration on numerous commedia all'italiana films with Agenore Incrocci, forming the duo Age & Scarpelli.

He was the son of journalist Filiberto Scarpelli. During his childhood he devoted himself to writing and drawing. During World War II, he started to work as an illustrator for satire magazines, together with Federico Fellini and Ettore Scola, and he met Agenore Incrocci, better known as "Age".

Furio was born and died in Rome, Italy.

In 1949, he started his famous collaboration with Age as the duo Age & Scarpelli, writing some of the first Totò successes until 1952.

Together with Age, he worked on a total of 120 Italian movies. These include some of the most famous of all, such as Sergio Leone's The Good, the Bad and the Ugly and Mario Monicelli's Big Deal on Madonna Street. After closing his relationship with Age, he wrote several movies with Ettore Scola, and the first works of directors such as Francesca Archibugi and Paolo Virzì. His third Nomination to Oscar was for Il Postino: The Postman, written with his son Giacomo. He also taught at the Centro Sperimentale di Cinematografia. The film Tormenti (2011), adapted from his graphic novel, was released shortly after his death.

== Awards ==
- Golden Lion per il film The Great War (1959)
- Nastro d'Argento per il film Big Deal on Madonna Street (1959)
- Oscar Nomination dell'Academy of Motion Picture Arts and Sciences per il film I Compagni (1964)
- Oscar Nomination dell'Academy of Motion Picture Arts and Sciences per il film Casanova '70 (1965)
- Nastro d'Argento per il film Sedotta e abbandonata (1965)
- Nastro d'Argento per il film Signore e signori (1967)
- Nastro d'Argento per il film C'eravamo tanto amati (1975)
- David di Donatello per il film Romanzo popolare (1975)
- Nastro d'Argento per il film La Terrazza (1980)
- Premio Cannes per la sceneggiatura de La Terrazza (1980)
- Premio Flaiano - Pegaso d'Oro alla carriera (1980)
- Ciak d'Oro per il film La Famiglia (1986)
- Nastro d'Argento per il film La Famiglia (1987)
- David di Donatello per il film La Famiglia (1987)
- Oscar Nomination dell'Academy of Motion Picture Arts and Sciences per il film Il Postino (1995)
- Nomination della British Academy of Film and Television Arts per il film Il Postino (1995)
- David di Donatello per il film Celluloide (1996)
- Globo d'Oro per il film Celluloide (1996)
- Ciak d'Oro per il film Testimone a rischio (1997)
- Grolla d'Oro per il film La Cena (1999)
- Nomination della European Film Awards per il film "Concorrenza Sleale" (2001)
- Premio Flaiano – Pegaso d'Oro per il film Concorrenza Sleale (2001)
- Premio Elsa Morante ragazzi per Opopomoz (2004)
- Grolla d'Oro per il film La buona battaglia – Don Pietro Pappagallo (2006)
- Premio Flaiano – Pegaso d'Oro per il film La buona battaglia – Don Pietro Pappagallo (2006)

== Filmography ==
- Toto Looks for a House, directed by Steno, Mario Monicelli (1949)
- Totò le Mokò, directed by Carlo Ludovico Bragaglia (1949)
- Vivere a sbafo, directed by Giorgio Ferroni (1949)
- Toto the Sheik, directed by Mario Mattoli (1950)
- Totò Tarzan, directed by Mario Mattoli (1950)
- Figaro Here, Figaro There, directed by Carlo Ludovico Bragaglia (1950)
- The Cadets of Gascony, directed by Mario Mattoli (1950)
- The Merry Widower, directed by Mario Mattoli (1950)
- 47 morto che parla, directed by Carlo Ludovico Bragaglia (1950)
- The Knight Has Arrived!, directed by Mario Monicelli, Steno (1950)
- Toto Looks for a Wife, directed by Carlo Ludovico Bragaglia (1950)
- Una bruna indiavolata!, directed by Carlo Ludovico Bragaglia (1951)
- O.K. Nerone, directed by Mario Soldati (1951)
- Cameriera bella presenza offresi..., directed by Giorgio Pastina (1951)
- Toto the Third Man, directed by Mario Mattoli (1951)
- Milano miliardaria, directed by Marino Girolami, Marcello Marchesi, Vittorio Metz (1951)
- Arrivano i nostri, directed by Mario Mattoli (1951)
- Auguri e figli maschi!, directed by Giorgio Simonelli (1951)
- Seven Hours of Trouble, directed by Vittorio Metz, Marcello Marchesi (1951)
- Rome-Paris-Rome, directed by Luigi Zampa (1951)
- The Three Pirates, directed by Mario Soldati (1952)
- At Sword's Edge, directed by Carlo Ludovico Bragaglia (1952)
- Don Lorenzo, directed by Carlo Ludovico Bragaglia (1952)
- The Secret of Three Points, directed by Carlo Ludovico Bragaglia (1952)
- Ragazze da marito, directed by Eduardo De Filippo (1952)
- Toto in Color, directed by Steno (1952)
- Toto and the Women, directed by Steno, Mario Monicelli (1952)
- It Happened in the Park, directed by Vittorio De Sica, Gianni Franciolini (1953)
- Ivan, Son of the White Devil, directed by Guido Brignone (1953)
- Cinema d'altri tempi, directed by Steno (1953)
- Neapolitans in Milan, directed by Eduardo De Filippo (1953)
- Saluti e baci, directed by Maurice Labro, Giorgio Simonelli (1953)
- The Enchanting Enemy, directed by Claudio Gora (1953)
- What Scoundrels Men Are!, directed by Glauco Pellegrini (1953)
- Casta Diva, directed by Carmine Gallone (1954)
- House of Ricordi, directed by Carmine Gallone (1954)
- A Slice of Life, directed by Alessandro Blasetti (1954)
- Laugh! Laugh! Laugh!, directed by Edoardo Anton (1954)
- Symphony of Love, directed by Glauco Pellegrini (1954)
- Una pelliccia di visone, directed by Glauco Pellegrini (1954)
- Roman Tales, directed by Gianni Franciolini (1955)
- Bravissimo, directed by Luigi Filippo D'Amico (1955)
- Don Camillo's Last Round, directed by Carmine Gallone (1955) (uncredited)
- Le signorine dello 04, directed by Gianni Franciolini (1955)
- Toto and Carolina, directed by Mario Monicelli (1955)
- The Bigamist, directed by Luciano Emmer (1956)
- The Band of Honest Men, directed by Camillo Mastrocinque (1956)
- Peccato di castità, directed by Gianni Franciolini (1956)
- Time of Vacation, directed by Antonio Racioppi (1956)
- Souvenirs d'Italie, directed by Antonio Pietrangeli (1957)
- Fathers and Sons, directed by Mario Monicelli (1957)
- Doctor and the Healer, directed by Mario Monicelli (1957)
- The Law Is the Law, directed by Christian-Jaque (1958)
- Big Deal on Madonna Street, directed by Mario Monicelli (1958)
- Hercules, directed by Pietro Francisci (1958)
- March's Child, directed by Antonio Pietrangeli (1958)
- Toto, Peppino and the Fanatics, directed by Mario Mattoli (1958)
- The Great War, directed by Mario Monicelli (1959)
- Policarpo, directed by Mario Soldati (1959)
- The Passionate Thief, directed by Mario Monicelli (1960)
- Love and Larceny, directed by Dino Risi (1960)
- Everybody Go Home, directed by Luigi Comencini (1960)
- Audace colpo dei soliti ignoti, directed by Nanni Loy (1960)
- Il principe fusto, directed by Maurizio Arena (1960)
- On the Tiger's Back, directed by Luigi Comencini (1961)
- The Best of Enemies, directed by Guy Hamilton (1961)
- March on Rome, directed by Dino Risi (1962)
- Mafioso, directed by Alberto Lattuada (1962)
- The Police Commissioner, directed by Luigi Comencini (1962)
- Toto and Peppino Divided in Berlin, directed by Giorgio Bianchi (1962)
- I mostri, directed by Dino Risi (1963)
- The Organizer, directed by Mario Monicelli (1963)
- The Teacher from Vigevano, directed by Elio Petri (1963)
- Shivers in Summer, directed by Luigi Zampa (1964)
- I complessi, directed by Dino Risi, Franco Rossi, Luigi Filippo D'Amico (1964)
- Seduced and Abandoned, directed by Pietro Germi (1964)
- Casanova '70, directed by Mario Monicelli (1965)
- The Good, the Bad and the Ugly, directed by Sergio Leone (1966)
- Our Husbands, directed by Luigi Filippo D'Amico, Luigi Zampa, Dino Risi (1966)
- For Love and Gold, directed by Mario Monicelli (1966)
- Me, Me, Me... and the Others, directed by Alessandro Blasetti (1966)
- The Birds, the Bees and the Italians, directed by Pietro Germi (1966)
- The Tiger and the Pussycat, directed by Dino Risi (1967)
- The Witches, directed by Mauro Bolognini, Vittorio De Sica, Pier Paolo Pasolini, Franco Rossi, Luchino Visconti (1967)
- Will Our Heroes Be Able to Find Their Friend Who Has Mysteriously Disappeared in Africa?, directed by Ettore Scola (1968)
- Torture Me But Kill Me with Kisses, directed by Dino Risi (1968)
- Caprice Italian Style, directed by Mauro Bolognini, Mario Monicelli, Pier Paolo Pasolini, Steno, Pino Zac, Franco Rossi (1968)
- Quel negozio di Piazza Navona (1969) TV miniseries
- Brancaleone at the Crusades, directed by Mario Monicelli (1970)
- FBI - Francesco Bertolazzi investigatore (1970) Miniserie TV
- Rosolino Paternò, soldato..., directed by Nanni Loy (1970)
- The Pizza Triangle, directed by Ettore Scola (1970)
- In the Name of the Italian People, directed by Dino Risi (1971)
- Without Family, directed by Vittorio Gassman (1972)
- Teresa the Thief, directed by Carlo Di Palma (1973)
- We Want the Colonels, directed by Mario Monicelli (1973)
- We All Loved Each Other So Much, directed by Ettore Scola (1974)
- Come Home and Meet My Wife, directed by Mario Monicelli (1974)
- The Sunday Woman, directed by Luigi Comencini (1975)
- Basta che non si sappia in giro, directed by Nanni Loy, Luigi Magni, Luigi Comencini (1976)
- Goodnight, Ladies and Gentlemen, directed by Luigi Comencini, Nanni Loy, Luigi Magni, Mario Monicelli, Ettore Scola (1976)
- Double Murder, directed by Steno (1977)
- Where Are You Going on Holiday?, directed by Mauro Bolognini, Luciano Salce, Alberto Sordi (1978)
- Gros-Câlin, directed by Jean-Pierre Rawson (1979)
- Sunday Lovers, directed by Bryan Forbes, Edouard Molinaro, Dino Risi, Gene Wilder (1980)
- La terrazza, directed by Ettore Scola (1980)
- Hurricane Rosy, directed by Mario Monicelli (1980)
- Portrait of a Woman, Nude , directed by Nino Manfredi (1981)
- Camera d'albergo, directed by Mario Monicelli (1981)
- Spaghetti House, directed by Giulio Paradisi (1982)
- Ballando ballando, directed by Ettore Scola (1983)
- Il tassinaro, directed by Alberto Sordi (1983)
- A Boy and a Girl, directed by Marco Risi (1984)
- Cuori nella tormenta, directed by Enrico Oldoini (1984)
- Macaroni, directed by Ettore Scola (1985)
- My Dearest Son, directed by Valentino Orsini (1985)
- Madman at War, directed by Dino Risi (1985)
- The Family, directed by Ettore Scola (1987)
- Soldati - 365 all'alba, directed by Marco Risi (1987)
- Time to Kill, directed by Giuliano Montaldo (1989)
- Captain Fracassa's Journey, directed by Ettore Scola (1990)
- Briganti, directed by Marco Modugno (1990)
- The Wicked, directed by Carlo Lizzani (1991)
- Per amore o per amicizia, directed by Paolo Poeti (1993) (TV)
- Celluloide, directed by Carlo Lizzani (1995)
- Il Postino: The Postman, directed by Michael Radford (1994)
- A Cold, Cold Winter, directed by Roberto Cimpanelli (1996)
- An Eyewitness Account, directed by Pasquale Pozzessere (1996)
- Ovosodo, directed by Paolo Virzì (1997)
- Other Men, directed by Claudio Bonivento (1997)
- Porzûs, directed by Renzo Martinelli (1997)
- The Dinner, directed by Ettore Scola (1998)
- La missione, directed by Maurizio Zaccaro (1998) (TV)
- Unfair Competition, directed by Ettore Scola (2001)
- Opopomoz, directed by Enzo D'Alò (2003)
- Napoleon and Me, directed by Paolo Virzì (2006)
- Baciami piccina, directed by Roberto Cimpanelli (2006)
- La buona battaglia – Don Pietro Pappagallo, directed by Gianfranco Albano (2006) (TV)
- Christine Cristina, directed by Stefania Sandrelli (2010)
- Tormenti - Film disegnato, directed by Filiberto Scarpelli (2011)
