= Sex Quartet =

1966 anthology film

- Italian theatrical release poster
- Italian: Le fate
- Directed by: Mauro Bolognini; Mario Monicelli; Luciano Salce; Antonio Pietrangeli
- Screenplay by: Ruggero Maccari; Luigi Magni; Suso Cecchi D'Amico; Rodolfo Sonego
- Story by: Ruggero Maccari; Luigi Magni; Tonino Guerra; Giorgio Salvioni; Rodolfo Sonego
- Produced by: Gianni Hecht Lucari
- Starring: Capucine; Claudia Cardinale; Alberto Sordi; Jean Sorel; Monica Vitti; Raquel Welch; Enrico Maria Salerno; Gastone Moschin
- Cinematography: Dario Di Palma; Leonida Barboni; Carlo Di Palma; Armando Nannuzzi
- Edited by: Giovanni Baragli; Franco Fraticelli; Ruggero Mastroianni; Sergio Montanari
- Music by: Armando Trovajoli
- Production companies: Documento Film; Columbia Films
- Distributed by: Columbia C.E.I.A.D. (Italy); Columbia Films (France)
- Release dates: 25 November 1966 (Italy); 19 July 1967 (France)
- Running time: 111 minutes
- Countries: Italy; France
- Language: Italian

Sex Quartet (Italian: Le fate, lit. 'The Fairies'), released as The Queens in the United States, is a 1966 comedy anthology film consisting of four segments respectively directed by Mario Monicelli, Mauro Bolognini, Antonio Pietrangeli and Luciano Salce. It stars Capucine, Claudia Cardinale, Monica Vitti and Raquel Welch.

== Plot ==
=== "Queen Sabina" ("Fata Sabina") ===
- Director: Luciano Salce
- Screenplay and story: Ruggero Maccari and Luigi Magni

Sabina, a young hitchhiker headed for Rome, is chased through the woods by a man attempting to rape her until a middle-aged businessman rescues her. As the businessman drives her, she recounts that, after she met her attacker at a party, he offered to drive her home, but then began harassing her due to her revealing dress. Tempted by Sabina, the businessman begins chasing her through the woods as well before a passing motorist, Gianni, gives her a ride. Unlike the previous men, Gianni, a visitor from San Marino, maintains his composure in the company of Sabina, declaring that Italian men are easily aroused by women because they are sexually frustrated. Gianni stops to make a phone call to his lover, and after Sabina overhears their passionate conversation, she attempts to seduce him and chases him through the woods.

=== "Queen Armenia" ("Fata Armenia") ===
- Director: Mario Monicelli
- Screenplay: Suso Cecchi D'Amico
- Story: Tonino Guerra and Giorgio Salvioni

Armenia Bianchi, a young, manipulative Gypsy, disrupts the monotonous life of Dr. Aldini when she brings her newborn baby to his clinic, where she makes a scene and accuses him of sexually harassing her, prompting him to angrily throw her out. On his way home from work one evening, Aldini encounters Armenia, who apologizes for her behavior and asks him to look after her baby while she goes to buy food. When they accidentally become separated, Aldini takes the baby home. Later that night, when Armenia finally arrives at Aldini's apartment to pick up her baby, she invites herself to use his bathtub and climbs into his bed.

The next morning, Armenia stops by Aldini's clinic to inform him that she is leaving town with her baby. However, they realize that the baby, whom Armenia had left in Aldini's car, has disappeared. After learning that someone driving a car similar to Aldini's has taken the baby to the airport, Armenia and Aldini frantically rush to the airport. Armenia soon finds the baby, but Aldini realizes that she has mistakenly taken a Chinese baby, just as the correct baby is found in the back seat of another man's car in the parking lot. Aldini offers to return the Chinese baby to its parents, and before leaving, Armenia announces she is no longer leaving town. Later, Aldini visits Armenia's home and finds her baby with its actual mother, who reveals that Armenia is her babysitter and has left suddenly.

=== "Queen Elena" ("Fata Elena") ===
- Director: Mauro Bolognini
- Screenplay and story: Rodolfo Sonego

When Luigi visits his friend Alberto's house to collect a check, he encounters Alberto's wife, Elena, and finds himself attracted to her. Luigi succumbs to Elena's charms, and after they have sex in the kitchen, she remains undaunted, calmly embroidering in the living room in the presence of Alberto and her guests. Feeling uncomfortable, Luigi returns home, only to find his own wife, Claudia, also embroidering in the company of a male friend, causing Luigi to become suspicious of her.

=== "Queen Marta" ("Fata Marta") ===
- Director: Antonio Pietrangeli
- Screenplay and story: Rodolfo Sonego

While drunk at a lavish party, Marta, the wife of a wealthy and famous surgeon, has an affair with a servant, Giovanni, giving him her lighter as a souvenir. That same evening, Marta's husband hires Giovanni as the couple's chauffeur and butler. Giovanni is confused the next day when Marta does not seem to remember their tryst, treating him with disdain over the next few days. One night, while Marta's husband is on a business trip to Geneva, Giovanni returns the lighter to her and mentions their sexual encounter at the party, but she vehemently denies it. After another party, an intoxicated Marta seduces Giovanni and they have sex again, but when he brings her breakfast in bed in the morning, she lashes out at him for entering her bedroom. He soon realizes that Marta is strict and scrupulous when sober, but loses her inhibitions when drunk. Later, Giovanni hands Marta her lighter while driving her, but this time, he claims he found it in the house, smiling to himself.

== Cast ==
"Queen Sabina"

- Monica Vitti as Sabina
- Enrico Maria Salerno as Gianni
- Renzo Giovampietro as the second motorist
- Franco Balducci as the first motorist (uncredited)

"Queen Armenia"

- Claudia Cardinale as Armenia
- Gastone Moschin as Dr. Aldini
- Corrado Olmi as Aldini's friend

"Queen Elena"

- Raquel Welch as Elena
- Jean Sorel as Luigi
- Clotilde Sakaroff (credited as Clotilde Sakharoff) as the governess
- Franco Morici
- Pia Lindström as Claudia (uncredited)

"Queen Marta"

- Alberto Sordi as Giovanni
- Capucine as Marta
- Olga Villi as Countess Rattazzi
- Anthony Steel as the professor, Marta's husband
- Gigi Ballista as the priest
- Nino Marchetti as the guest

== Production ==
Capucine and Cardinale had previously appeared together in The Pink Panther (1963).
