= Arrivano i bersaglieri =

- Directed by: Luigi Magni
- Starring: Ugo Tognazzi
- Cinematography: Danilo Desideri
- Edited by: Ruggero Mastroianni
- Music by: Armando Trovajoli
- Release date: 1980
- Language: Italian

Arrivano i bersaglieri is a 1980 Italian historical-comedy film written and directed by Luigi Magni. The film is set during the days of the capture of Rome (1870), an event that marked the Italian unification and the end of the Papal States and of the temporal power of the Popes.

== Cast ==
- Ugo Tognazzi: Don Prospero
- Giovanna Ralli: Nunziatina, the maid
- Ombretta Colli: Costanza, Don Prospero's wife
- Giovannella Grifeo: Olimpia
- Vittorio Mezzogiorno: Don Alfonso dell'Aquila d'Aragona
- Pippo Franco: Father Paolo
- Enrico Papa: Gustavo Martini
- Mariano Rigillo: Alfonso La Marmora
- Carlo Bagno: Pope Pius IX
- Daniele Dublino: Don Pietro
- Ricky Tognazzi: Urbano, Prospero's child
