= Secondo Ponzio Pilato =

- Theatrical release poster
- Directed by: Luigi Magni
- Written by: Luigi Magni
- Produced by: Franco Committeri
- Starring: Nino Manfredi; Stefania Sandrelli; Lando Buzzanca; Mario Scaccia; Flavio Bucci
- Cinematography: Giorgio Di Battista
- Edited by: Ruggero Mastroianni
- Music by: Angelo Branduardi
- Production companies: Massfilm; Reteitalia
- Distributed by: United International Pictures
- Release date: 1987
- Running time: 105 minutes
- Country: Italy
- Language: Italian

Secondo Ponzio Pilato (English: "According to Ponzio Pilato" is the traditional way of attributing Gospels authors' names) is a 1987 Italian historical comedy drama film written and directed by Luigi Magni. The film is an example of Magnis's typical approach to critical interpretation of history. Stefania Sandrelli was awarded the Nastro d'Argento for Best Actress prize for her performance in the movie.

== Plot ==
The Roman governor Pontius Pilate then runs Jesus Christ and then, never mind, allows Christ to be executed after being scourged. Jesus Christ had promised to his followers that he would be resurrected within three days after his death. From this point Pontius Pilate begins to be opposed and hated by the Roman people that he realizes his mistake and that the Jews, who in turn are severely punished by the Emperor Tiberius.

The family of Pontius is all against him, and the Roman province of Galilee erupts into chaos when Jesus really resurrects. After a military intervention of Tiberius in the area where Jesus lived to restore order, approve without much thinking about it a law that condemns Ponzio. He in fact did so, although it was powerful, that the situation capitulate against him, that he wants to be puntio for his guilt of having shamefully condemned the poor Jesus After asking pardon of God, Pontius Pilate and as a result beheaded ago for the conversion can be defined as "blessed."

== Cast ==
- Nino Manfredi as Pontius Pilate
- Stefania Sandrelli as Claudia Procula
- Lando Buzzanca as Valerian
- Mario Scaccia as Tiberius
- Flavio Bucci as Herod Antipas
- Antonio Pierfederici as Joseph of Arimathea
- Relja Basic as Annas
- Cosimo Cinieri as Caiaphas
- Roberto Herlitzka as Barabbas
- Carlo Panchetti as Jesus
- Rita Capobianco as Salome
- Luisa De Santis as Estherina
- Lara Naszinski as The angel
- Pino Quartullo as Longinus
- Ricky Tognazzi as Legionary
- Nini Salerno as Legionary

== Production ==
The film was announced on December 1985. Principal cinematography started on 19 January 1987. It was filmed between Syracuse, Algeria and Tunisia. It had a budget of about 5 billion lire.

== Release ==
The film premiered at the second edition of the Funny Film Festival in Darfo Boario Terme on 28 September 1987. It was released in Italian cinemas on 15 January 1988 and was a box office bomb.
