= I mostri =

- Directed by: Dino Risi
- Written by: Agenore Incrocci; Ruggero Maccari; Elio Petri; Dino Risi; Furio Scarpelli; Ettore Scola
- Produced by: Mario Cecchi Gori
- Starring: Vittorio Gassman; Ugo Tognazzi; Rika Diallina
- Cinematography: Alfio Contini
- Edited by: Maurizio Lucidi
- Music by: Armando Trovajoli
- Release dates: 26 October 1963 (Italy); 10 April 1968 (U.S.)
- Running time: 115 minutes (Italian version) / 87 minutes (US version)
- Country: Italy
- Language: Italian

I mostri (also known as Opiate '67 or, in a cut version, 15 from Rome) is a 1963 commedia all'italiana film by Italian director Dino Risi. It was coproduced with France.

The film was a huge success in Italy. It was censored in Spain. In 1977 an Academy Award nominee sequel was filmed, entitled I nuovi mostri (Viva Italia!).

In 2008, the film was included on the Italian Ministry of Cultural Heritage’s 100 Italian films to be saved, a list of 100 films that "have changed the collective memory of the country between 1942 and 1978."

== Plot ==
The film features several episodes in which actors Ugo Tognazzi and Vittorio Gassman are the greatest performers. The themes of the short stories are intended to offer a clear picture of the habits, vices, of cheating and taste typical of the majority of Italians in the Sixties. Obviously the characters and funny situations are written and staged in a way that touches the limits of satire and coarseness, but many of these issues are still recognized by the Italian society. The satire of the episodes affects people of both noble origins of poor people, both political and police officers who abuse their power and, last but not least the middle classes. The episode The Monster depicts a man who has killed the whole family and has barricaded himself in the house was arrested by two policemen (Gassman and Tognazzi) and photographed with the present. However, although the man is a murderer, the two cops are real monsters of ugliness. Another episode is Education, in which Tognazzi's character informs his son (Ricky Tognazzi) that one succeeds in life by cheating, not through toil. Among other stratagems, the son learns to bully classmates into doing his schoolwork, and to lie about his age to gain free admission to a fair. The boy grows up, and, having taken his lessons to heart, kills his father and steals his possessions.

== Episodes ==
The original version is composed of 20 episodes, all starred by Vittorio Gassman and Ugo Tognazzi:

- "L'educazione sentimentale"
- "La raccomandazione"
- "Il mostro"
- "Come un padre"
- "Presa dalla vita"
- "Il povero soldato"
- "Che vitaccia"
- "La giornata dell'onorevole"
- "Latin lovers"
- "Testimone volontario"
- "I due orfanelli"
- "L'agguato"
- "Il sacrificato"
- "Vernissage"
- "La musa"
- "Scende l'oblio"
- "La strada è di tutti"
- "L'oppio dei popoli"
- "Il testamento di Francesco"
- "La nobile arte"
