= Le Bal (1983 film) =

- Film poster
- Directed by: Ettore Scola
- Written by: Jean-Claude Penchenat; Ruggero Maccari; Furio Scarpelli; Ettore Scola
- Produced by: Franco Committeri
- Cinematography: Ricardo Aronovich
- Edited by: Raimondo Crociani
- Music by: Vladimir Cosma
- Production companies: Cinéproduction; Films A2; Massfilm; O.N.C.I.C. Ministère de la Culture de la Republique Française
- Distributed by: AMLF (France); Almi Classics (USA); L.C.J. Editions & Productions (Worldwide)
- Release date: 21 December 1983
- Running time: 110 minutes
- Countries: Italy; France; Algeria
- Language: No dialogue

Le bal (Italian: Ballando ballando, French pronunciation: [lə bal], meaning "The ball") is a 1983 Italian-Franco-Algerian musical film without dialogue directed by Ettore Scola that represents a fifty-year story of French society by way of a ballroom in France.

The film is set in Paris, covering the years from 1936 to 1983. The film begins with a victory of the left-wing Popular Front in the 1936 French legislative election. It proceeds to depict the Battle of France, the end of the German-occupied France, the end of World War II in Europe and attacks on collaborators, the rise in popularity of swing music and rock and roll, the Algerian War, the Protests of 1968, and the end of a night of dancing in the 1980s.

== Plot ==
The entire plot takes place inside a semi-underground dance hall in Paris. It consists of a frame story set in the present and seven flashbacks, each depicting a period of the 20th century. Each flashback ends with a snapshot that leads to the next flashback (as a photograph above the bar). The same actors/dancers always play different characters.

=== 1983 ===
An old waiter enters the still-closed bar and makes the necessary preparations. Nine women, accompanied by the music J'attendrai (canned music), gradually enter the stalls, followed by eleven men together during the song What Now My Love. The band starts to play and the company dances. While the waiter pours a coffee, the first flashback begins:

=== 1936 ===
The French Popular Front has won the 1936 French legislative election and its supporters are celebrating. While the party is dancing a valse musette, a pretentious bourgeois enters the restaurant with his festively dressed wife. The woman allows herself to be kissed by a dancer (dressed like Jean Gabin in Pépé le Moko); her husband first tries to take cocaine and later attempts suicide. The dancer stops him and the couple leave the bar. A representative of the political right then enters the pub, to which the dancers protest.

=== 1940 ===
Battle of France: During an air raid alarm, several people seek refuge in the pub. When the all-clear sounds, most of them go back outside; only one young couple eats a plate of spaghetti.

=== 1944 ===
The dancing company consists almost exclusively of women who remember their husbands at the front. One of them drowns her sorrows in alcohol. While the radio plays We're Going to Hang out the Washing on the Siegfried Line (in a French version), a French collaborator and a Wehrmacht officer enter the pub. They hastily switch to the German radio station with the song Lili Marleen. As the collaborator is unable to find a partner for the officer, he ends up dancing with him himself. Suddenly the peace bells ring and the officer flees. The Second World War is over in France.

=== 1945 ===
People celebrate the end of the war with the men who have returned home. The former collaborator is pushed around in a circle until he manages to escape. The scene suddenly becomes serious again as an invalid with only one leg appears, but he too joins the dancers.

=== 1946 ===
US culture moves in: While the Glenn Miller hit In the Mood is played, the waiter tries the new Coca-Cola and society tries the new swing - they are still struggling with both. The former collaborator drags two GIs into the pub; one of them has a trumpet and plays La vie en rose. The collaborator sells the dancers black market goods under the table.

=== 1956 ===
While a Mexican combo plays, the company dances first samba, then tango. A group of teenagers enter the pub; they dance rock 'n' roll. The Algerian War is raging in Africa; a burly Frenchman takes an Algerian dancer to the toilet, where he beats him up. The inspector who then appears (reminiscent of Jean Gabin as Inspector Maigret) mistakenly arrests the bleeding North African.

=== 1968 ===
During the Protests of 1968, demonstrators take refuge in the unlit dance hall after a street fight, where they dance to Michelle by the Beatles.

=== 1983 ===
Back in the present, the party stops dancing; everyone leaves the pub one by one. The waiter shakes a short-sighted lady awake who thinks she has finally been asked to dance. She realises her mistake and also goes home. The film ends with the lights being switched off.

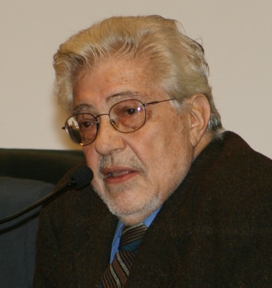
The director of the film: Ettore Scola

== Cast ==
None of the characters is named.

- Étienne Guichard as Le jeune étudiant de province / Le jeune professeur (The young provincial student, the young teacher)
- Régis Bouquet as Le patron de la salle / Le paysan (The owner of the hall, the peasant)
- Chantal Capron as Le mannequin (The model)
- Francesco De Rosa as Toni, le jeune serveur (Toni, the young waiter)
- Arnault LeCarpentier as Le jeune typographe / L'étudiant (The young typist, the student)
- Liliane Delval (Liliane Léotard) as La fille aux cheveux longs / L'alcoolique (The girl with long hair, the alcoholic)
- Martine Chauvin as La jeune fleuriste / L'étudiante (The young florist, the student)
- Danielle Rochard as La livreuse d'une modiste, La refugiée, (The milliner's deliverywoman, the refugee)
- Nani Noël as La fille de joie / La jeune juive / La jeune qui peint ses basses (The prostitute, the young Jewess, the young woman who paints her bass)
- Aziz Arbia as Le jeune ouvrier (The young labourer)
- Marc Berman as L'aristo / Le planqué / Le collaborationiste (The aristocrat, the coward, the collaborationist)
- Geneviève Rey-Penchenat as L'aristo (The aristocrat)
- Michel van Speybroeck as L'homme qui vient de loin / Jean Gabin (The man from far away, Jean Gabin)
- Rossana Di Lorenzo as La dame-pipi (The toilet attendant)
- Michel Toty as L'ouvrier spécialisé (The specialist worker)
- Raymonde Heudeline as L'ouvrière (The worker)
- Jean-Claude Penchenat as La 'croix de feu' (The Croix-de-Feu member, a French proto-fascist group)
- Jean-Francois Perrier as le sacristain amoureux / l'officier allemand (The amorous sacristan, the German officer)
- Monica Scattini as La jeune fille myope (The young short-sighted girl)

== Release ==
Le Bal was released in the United States in March 1984.

== Reception ==
Vincent Canby from The New York Times gave the film a very good review, stating: "Because Le Bal is a spectacle, most of the performers, unfortunately, remain anonymous, though their contributions are enormous. The film has been choreographed as much as directed in any conventional sense, but the physical production is outstanding. In the 1936 sequence, Mr Scola and his cinematographer, Ricardo Aronovich miraculously drain virtually all the color from the images to create a look that suggests hand-tinted photographs that have begun to fade. More than anything else, these exemplify the mood of the entire film."

=== Accolades ===
| Award | Subject | Nominee | Result |
|---|---|---|---|
| Academy Awards | Academy Award for Best Foreign Language Film | Algeria | Nominated |
| Berlin International Film Festival | Reader Jury of the "Berliner Morgenpost" | Ettore Scola | Won |
| Berlin International Film Festival | Best Director | Ettore Scola | Won |
| Berlin International Film Festival | Golden Bear | Ettore Scola | Nominated |
| César Award | Best Film | Franco Committeri | Won |
| César Award | Best Director | Ettore Scola | Won |
| César Award | Best Original Music | Vladimir Cosma | Won |
| César Award | Best Cinematography | Ricardo Aronovich | Nominated |
| David di Donatello | Alitalia Award | Ettore Scola | Won |
| David di Donatello | Best Film | Franco Committeri | Won |
| David di Donatello | Best Director | Ettore Scola | Won |
| David di Donatello | Best Score | Vladimir Cosma; Armando Trovajoli | Won |
| David di Donatello | Best Editing | Raimondo Crociani | Won |
| David di Donatello | Best Supporting Actress | Rossana Di Lorenzo | Nominated |
| David di Donatello | Best Costumes | Ezio Altieri | Nominated |

== See also ==
- List of submissions to the 56th Academy Awards for Best Foreign Language Film
- List of Algerian submissions for the Academy Award for Best Foreign Language Film
