= In the Name of the Pope King =

- Directed by: Luigi Magni
- Written by: Luigi Magni
- Produced by: Franco Committeri
- Starring: Nino Manfredi; Danilo Mattei; Carlo Bagno
- Cinematography: Danilo Desideri
- Edited by: Ruggero Mastroianni
- Music by: Armando Trovajoli
- Release date: December 3, 1977
- Running time: 103 minutes
- Country: Italy
- Language: Italian
- Box office: 1.9 billion lire

In the Name of the Pope King (Italian: In nome del papa re) is a 1977 Italian drama film written, and directed by Luigi Magni. Starring Nino Manfredi, it was not released in USA until 1986. The score was composed by Armando Trovajoli.

== Plot ==
In October 1867, Papal Rome, under the rule of Pius IX, is shaken by a bomb explosion in the sewers of the barracks of Palazzo Serristori, which kills twenty-three French Papal Zouaves. A countess, the secret mother of revolutionary Cesare Costa, who is accused with friends Giuseppe Monti and Gaetano Tognetti of having organised this massacre, goes to a judge of the Holy See, Bishop of Priverno Colombo, asking him to help her.

To overcome the resistance of the Prelate, she tells him that he is the father of the accused, born during their short affair in 1849. The prelate is able to release him, hiding him in his house along with his girlfriend, but he is not able to intervene in favor of the other two arrested and sentenced to death by the ecclesiastical court, despite an eloquent speech pronounced in front of the court. This speech causes a severe reprimand by the Pope and the General of the Jesuits, at that time called "the Black Pope" (il Papa Nero) due to the strong power exercised by this Order on the papacy.

At the end, however, Cesare Costa is shot in an ambush by the husband of the countess who believed him to be his wife's lover. Finally, Colombo cites a letter full of bitterness and resentment that he would like to write to the Pope, but to no avail, because of his perpetual cry for sorrow. The movie ends when Colombo breaks with the general of the Society of Jesus, since during a holy Mass he is celebrating, Colombo refuses to administer the Holy Eucharist (communion) to the Jesuit's General, who appears in Church to arrest Colombo.

The film describes the advanced decrepitude of the temporal power and its laws in Papal Rome. As an example, after the above-mentioned speech of Monsignor Colombo, one of the old cardinals is awakened from his deep sleep, just to vote in favour of the death penalty of Monti and Tognetti. This power will fall three years later with the Breach of Porta Pia.

== Cast ==
- Nino Manfredi: Monsignor Colombo
- Danilo Mattei: Cesare Costa
- Carmen Scarpitta: Countess Flaminia
- Giovannella Grifeo: Teresa
- Carlo Bagno: Perpetuo
- Ettore Manni: Count Ottavio
- Gabriella Giacobbe: Maria Tognetti
- Camillo Milli: Don Marino
- Rosalino Cellamare: Gaetano Tognetti
- Salvo Randone: Black Pope

== Reception ==
The film was the highest-grossing Italian film in Italy between August 1977 and April 1978 with a gross of over 1.9 billion lire ($2.2 million) and was second highest-grossing film in the country that year behind Star Wars.

== Awards ==
- Nastro d'Argento: Best Actor, Best Supporting Actor (Carlo Bagno) and Best Production Design.
- David di Donatello: Best Film, Best Producer and Best Actor.
