= Corrado Olmi =

Italian actor (1926–2020)

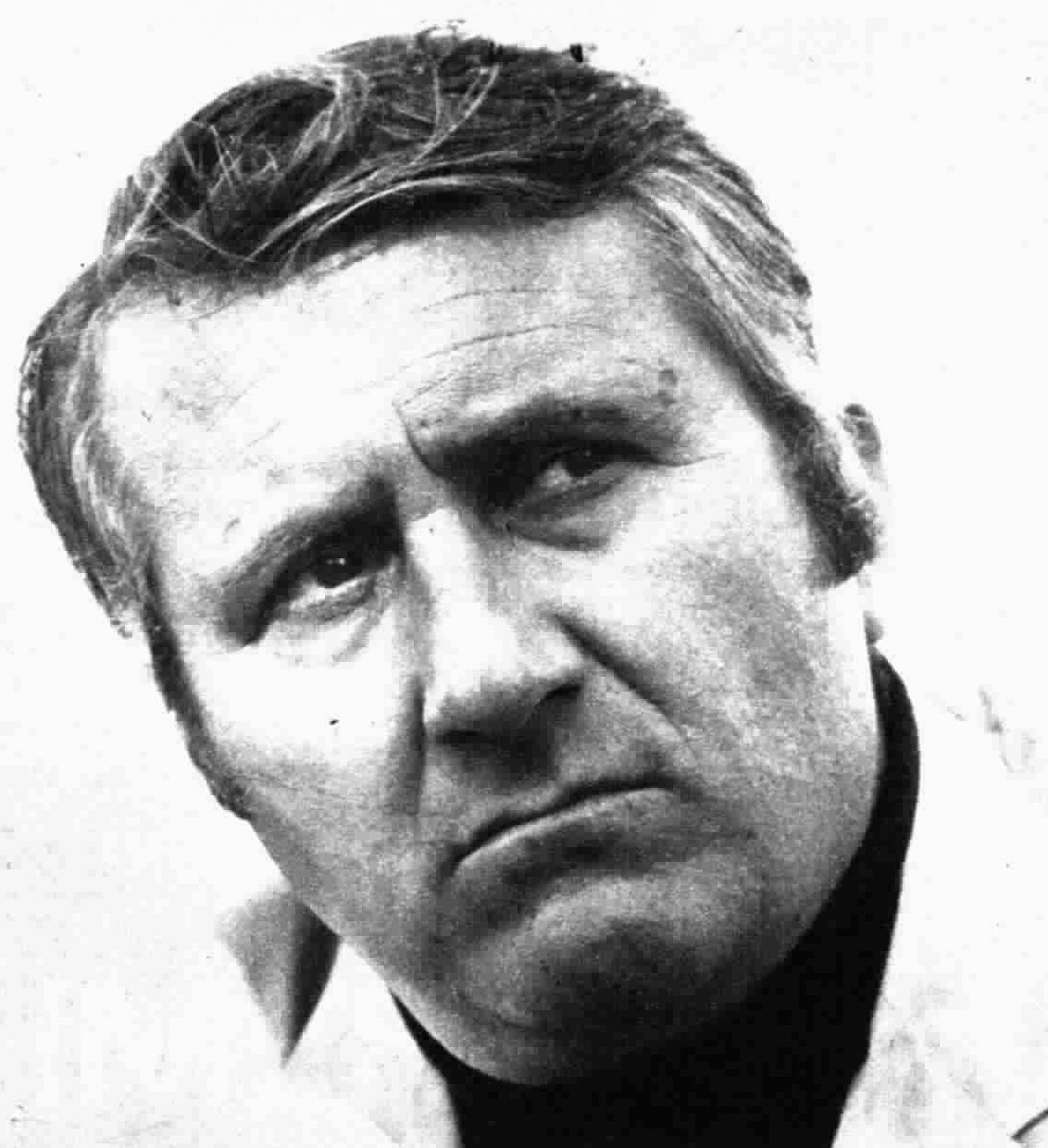
- Born: 24 October 1926; Jesi, Kingdom of Italy
- Died: 29 December 2020 (aged 94); Rome, Italy
- Occupation: Actor

Corrado Olmi (24 October 1926 – 29 December 2020) was an Italian actor and comedian.

== Life and career ==
Born in Jesi, Ancona, Olmi at very young age attended local amateur dramatic companies in his hometown. He later moved to Rome, where he graduated in law and during his studies attended the Peter Sharoff Theatre Academy. He was a very prolific stage actor, with hundreds of credits in works of prose, avanspettacolo, cabaret, operetta. He was also very active in television (in television movies, TV-series and variety shows) and in films, where he was one of the most requested character actors. Olmi is also the author of two autobiographical books, Oltre la scena and Oltre lo schermo.

He died from COVID-19 during the COVID-19 pandemic in Italy.

== Selected filmography ==
- Peccato di castità (1956)
- Chiamate 22-22 tenente Sheridan (1960) – Pat – journalist
- Un mandarino per Teo (1960) – Il signore in bianco
- A Girl... and a Million (1962) – Visonà's Friend
- Of Wayward Love (1962) – Carabiniere (segment "Il serpente")
- Adultero lui, adultera lei (1963) – L'avvocato dell'accusa
- Shivers in Summer (1964) – Furricchio
- I maniaci (1964) – The husband (segment "Il week-end")
- Clémentine chérie (1964)
- I due pericoli pubblici (1964) – Vigile (segment "Una domenica d'agosto")
- Slalom (1965) – Italian Embassy Official
- Wake Up and Die (1966) – Bobino, riccetatore
- Our Husbands (1966) – Monsignor Petrarca (segment "Il marito di Olga")
- Sex Quartet (1966) – Aldini's Friend (segment "Fata Armenia")
- The Devil in Love (1966) – Innkeeper
- A Stranger in Paso Bravo (1968) – Jonathan
- The Vatican Affair (1968) – Lentini
- Ace High (1968)
- Bandits in Rome (1968)
- Colpo di sole (1968)
- Satyricon (1969) – Seleuco
- 12 + 1 (1969) – Waiter (uncredited)
- The Archangel (1969) – Commissario Monteforte
- The Cat o' Nine Tails (1971) – Morsella
- Joe Dakota (1957)
- Armiamoci e partite! (1971) – German soldier
- Secret Fantasy (1971) – Violin teacher
- Four Flies on Grey Velvet (1971) – Porter
- A Girl in Australia (1971) – Don Anselmo
- Il provinciale (1971)
- Decameroticus (1972) – Ciacco
- My Darling Slave (1973) – A passenger
- Anno uno (1974) – Di Vittorio
- Professore venga accompagnato dai suoi genitori (1974) – Mr. Novelli
- L'uomo della strada fa giustizia (1975) – (uncredited)
- Scandal in the Family (1975) – don Erminio
- Apache Woman (1976) – Jeremy
- The Cricket (1980)
- Madly in Love (1981) – Sindaco
- Bollenti spiriti (1981) – Doctor
- Teste di quoio (1981) – Agente di viaggi
- Porca vacca (1982)
- Rich and Poor (1983) – S.O.F.R.A.M. Manager
- Il petomane (1983)
- Sfrattato cerca casa equo canone (1983) – Commissario
- Due strani papà (1984)
- Bonnie and Clyde Italian Style (1984) – Bonetti – negoziante di giocattoli
- Il ragazzo del Pony Express (1986) – Father of Agostino
- Missione eroica – I pompieri 2 (1987)
- Il coraggio di parlare (1987) – Milan worker
- Rimini Rimini – Un anno dopo (1988) – Flaminia's Husband ("La scelta")
- Don Bosco (1988)
- Italian Restaurant (1994, TV Mini-Series)
- The Dinner (1998) – Arturo
- Si fa presto a dire amore (2000) – Padre Enrico
