= Police Chief Pepe =

- Directed by: Ettore Scola
- Written by: Ruggero Maccari; Ettore Scola
- Produced by: Franco Cristaldi
- Starring: Ugo Tognazzi; Giuseppe Maffioli; Silvia Dionisio; Tano Cimarosa; Marianne Comtell; Elena Persiani
- Cinematography: Claudio Cirillo
- Edited by: Tatiana Casini Morigi
- Music by: Armando Trovajoli
- Release dates: 24 September 1969 (Italy); 5 September 1979 (France)
- Running time: 107 Min
- Country: Italy
- Language: Italian

Il Commissario Pepe or Police Chief Pepe is a 1969 Italian comedy – drama film directed by Ettore Scola.

It is based on a Ugo Facco De La Garda's novel.

Filmed in Vicenza, the city is never mentioned.

== Awards ==
Ugo Tognazzi was named Best Actor at Mar del Plata Film Festival.

== Plot ==
Antonio Pepe is the Chief Police Inspector of a provincial small city in North of Italy. He is forced to investigate the sexual life of the citizens, even to the local high society members.

== Cast ==
- Ugo Tognazzi as Antonio Pepe
- Giuseppe Maffioli as Nicola Parigi
- Silvia Dionisio as Silvia
- Tano Cimarosa as Agent Cariddi
- Marianne Comtell as Matilde Carroni
- Dana Ghia as Sister Clementina
- Elsa Vazzoler as Old Prostitute
- Véronique Vendell as Maristella Diotallevi
- Rita Calderoni as Clara Cerveteri
- Virgilio Scapin as Count Lancillotto
- Elena Persiani as Marquise Norma Zaccarin
- Gino Santercole as Oreste
- Pippo Starnazza as The Drunkard
