= I nuovi mostri =

- Italian film poster
- Directed by: Dino Risi; Ettore Scola; Mario Monicelli
- Written by: Agenore Incrocci; Ruggero Maccari; Giuseppe Moccia; Ettore Scola; Bernardino Zapponi
- Produced by: Pio Angeletti; Adriano De Micheli
- Starring: Vittorio Gassman; Ornella Muti; Ugo Tognazzi; Alberto Sordi
- Cinematography: Tonino Delli Colli
- Edited by: Alberto Gallitti
- Music by: Armando Trovajoli
- Distributed by: Titanus
- Release date: 15 December 1977
- Running time: 115 minutes 106 minutes (alternative cut); 102 minutes (French cut); 87 minutes (cut edition)
- Country: Italy
- Language: Italian

I nuovi mostri ("the new monsters"), known as Viva l'Italia! in the English-language version, is a 1977 commedia all'italiana film composed by 14 episodes, directed by Dino Risi, Ettore Scola and Mario Monicelli. It is a sequel of I mostri, made in 1963. It is followed by I mostri oggi (2009). It was nominated for the Academy Award for Best Foreign Language Film at the 51st Academy Awards.

== Episodes ==
The original version is composed by 14 episodes.

Episode	Director	Starring
"L'uccellino della Val Padana"	Ettore Scola	Ugo Tognazzi and Orietta Berti
"Con i saluti degli amici"	Dino Risi	Gianfranco Barra
"Tantum ergo"	Dino Risi	Vittorio Gassman
"Autostop"	Mario Monicelli	Ornella Muti and Eros Pagni
"Il sospetto"	Ettore Scola	Vittorio Gassman
"Pronto soccorso"	Mario Monicelli	Alberto Sordi and Luciano Bonanni
"Mammina e mammone"	Dino Risi	Ugo Tognazzi and Nerina Montagnani
"Cittadino esemplare"	Ettore Scola	Vittorio Gassman
"Pornodiva"	Dino Risi	Eros Pagni
"Sequestro di persona cara"	Ettore Scola	Vittorio Gassman
"Come una regina"	Ettore Scola	Alberto Sordi and Adelina Provin
"Hostaria!"	Ettore Scola	Vittorio Gassman and Ugo Tognazzi
"Senza parole"	Dino Risi	Ornella Muti and Yorgo Voyagis
"Elogio funebre"	Ettore Scola	Alberto Sordi

== Plot ==
The film, like the previous one, consists of short episodes that portray the evil and meanness of Italian middle-class society during the years of lead in the 70s.

Segment details
Tantum ergo	A cardinal stops by a small parish in the suburbs of Rome, where the local priest, a young far-left sympathizer, is organizing a protest of the local peasants facing eviction by the Church. The cardinal improvises an eloquent sermon, thus placating the peasants' animosity and peacefully sedating the protest. He resumes his journey without even concluding his speech.
Autostop	A motorist picks up an attractive young woman hitchhiking. To fend off his repeated advances during the journey, the girl pretends to be a dangerous escaped convict, aligning her story with the news of a recent prison break found on the driver's newspaper. The man believes the girl's story, but her plan backfires as the panic-stricken driver kills her at his earliest opportunity.
With the greetings of friends	A local mafioso strolls around the Sicilian town of Ragusa as the bystanders pay their respects to him. However, they all quickly retreat as the man is suddenly shot by two hitmen on a motorbike. When the carabinieri arrive on the scene, the dying boss gives an extreme display of omertà, by denying he was even assaulted.
Mommy and mammon	A mother-son pair of mentally challenged tramps spend the day wandering around Rome, scrounging for food, playing childish pranks and hoarding trash. At the end of their day, the pair return to their home overrun by garbage, in apparent denial of their miserable lives.
First aid	Giovan Maria Catalan Belmonte is a snobbish representative of the Roman black nobility. One night, he finds a man lying injured after being hit by a car. Belmonte reluctantly drives the wounded man in search for an available hospital. However, for a variety of reasons that expose the warts and contradictions of the Italian healthcare system — such as a Church-run hospital denying emergency services and a military hospital refusing civilians — no medical facility admits the man. Belmonte eventually sees no choice but to take the agonizing man back to where he found him, leaving him on his own.
Bird of the Po Valley	Fiorella is a successful nightclub singer managed by her unscrupulous and exploitative husband. After she loses her voice due to temporary illness, her husband forces her to undergo unnecessary and dangerous surgery. As Fiorella cannot recover on time for her demanding touring schedule, he sabotages the stairs and causes her to fall down. Fiorella resumes touring with both her legs broken, having turned into a charity case and leveraging the audience's pity rather than her lost vocal abilities.
The suspect	A police commissioner places a group of young far-left protesters under arrest, charging them with subversive activities. However, instead of focusing his attention on the actual suspects, he berates his undercover agent for ridiculing him whilst disguised as a protester.
Pornodiva	Two parents are negotiating the audition of their young daughter for a movie. They briefly hesitate upon learning that the film is pornographic and features a bestiality scene involving the girl and a monkey, but eventually they sign their daughter up anyway for a hefty fee.
Hostaria!	A group of wealthy socialites enter a typical Roman tavern and order the daily special. Inside the kitchen, the head waiter and the cook (who are in a turbulent homosexual relationship) have an extremely heated argument, during which they toss food at each other. They finally assemble the ordered dishes from the squashed remnants of their struggle and serve them to the unaware customers, who enjoy their meals regardless.
Model citizen	One evening, a man witnesses someone being beaten by a street gang and stabbed. Instead of helping the victim, he runs home and has dinner with his family, arguing about the meal while watching TV like nothing has happened.
Kidnapping of a loved one	A man makes a tearful appeal on TV, begging his wife's kidnappers to call him and state their conditions for her release. Once off the air, the man is revealed to have purposefully cut the phone line.
Like a queen	Franco lures his elderly mother to a nursing home, intending to check her in permanently. Noticing the sorry state of the lonely residents and amid rumors of physical abuse perpetrated by the nurses, Franco hesitates, but is pressured by his wife to convince his reluctant mother to remain. When the elderly woman resigns herself to staying in the hospice, Franco, in a brief moment of repentance, cries out to the nurses that they "treat her like a queen".
Without words	A young stewardess meets a handsome Middle-Eastern man. Though they do not speak a common language, they share a brief yet intense romantic relationship. When the stewardess is about to board her next flight, the man gives her a portable phonograph playing their love theme as a souvenir. The scene cuts to the news that the aircraft has exploded in mid-air, implying that the man was a terrorist who seduced the stewardess so he could plant the rigged record player on the plane.
Eulogy	The aging members of an avanspettacolo company attend a colleague's funeral. As one of them delivers the eulogy, he recalls and recreates the signature gags of the deceased, turning the speech itself into an improvised comedy sketch, which all the other mourners follow upon by singing and dancing in laughter.

== Editions ==
The full version of the film runs about 115 minutes, but upon its release in Italy, the film was censored a few episodes considered too "strong". The length of the cut version of the film lasts about 87 minutes.

== See also ==
- List of submissions to the 51st Academy Awards for Best Foreign Language Film
- List of Italian submissions for the Academy Award for Best Foreign Language Film
