= Macaroni (film) =

1985 film

- Film poster
- Directed by: Ettore Scola
- Written by: Ruggero Maccari; Furio Scarpelli; Ettore Scola
- Produced by: Franco Committeri; Aurelio De Laurentiis; Luigi De Laurentiis
- Starring: Marcello Mastroianni; Jack Lemmon
- Cinematography: Claudio Ragona
- Edited by: Carla Simoncelli
- Music by: Armando Trovajoli
- Production companies: Filmauro; Massfilm
- Distributed by: Filmauro
- Release date: 24 October 1985
- Running time: 104 minutes
- Country: Italy
- Language: Italian

Macaroni (Italian: Maccheroni) is a 1985 Italian comedy-drama film directed by Ettore Scola. The film, starring Marcello Mastroianni and Jack Lemmon, was selected as the Italian entry for the Best Foreign Language Film at the 58th Academy Awards, ahead of Federico Fellini's Ginger and Fred, but was not accepted as a nominee.

== Plot ==
Jack Lemmon plays a successful, physically exhausted, pill-popping American businessman, going through a divorce, who visits Naples, Italy. He spends several days there as a guest of a local business acquaintance, played by Marcello Mastroianni, who has a more laid-back philosophy and is devoted to his large family. In the process, Lemmon's character learns how to relax and live the good life.

== Cast ==
- Marcello Mastroianni as Antonio Jasiello
- Jack Lemmon (dubbed by Giuseppe Rinaldi) as Robert Traven
- Daria Nicolodi as Laura Di Falco
- Isa Danieli as Carmelina Jasiello
- Maria Luisa Santella as Door Keeper
- Patrizia Sacchi as Virginia
- Bruno Esposito as Giulio Jasiello
- Orsetta Gregoretti as Young actress in theater
- Marc Berman as French record producer
- Jean-François Perrier as French record producer
- Giovanna Sanfilippo as Maria
- Fabio Tenore as Pasqualino (the little monk)
- Marta Bifano as Luisella
- Aldo De Martino as Cottone (theater manager)
- Tilde De Spirito as The villain's mistress (as Clotilde De Spirito)

== Reception ==
Audiences polled by CinemaScore gave the film an average grade of "B-" on an A+ to F scale.

=== Box office ===
The film opened in the United States, distributed by Paramount Pictures, on 13 screens on 1 November 1985 and grossed $119,925 in its opening weekend.

== See also ==
- List of submissions to the 58th Academy Awards for Best Foreign Language Film
- List of Italian submissions for the Academy Award for Best Foreign Language Film
