= My Name Is Rocco Papaleo =

1971 film

- DVD cover
- Directed by: Ettore Scola
- Written by: Peter Goldfarb; Ruggero Maccari; Ettore Scola
- Starring: Marcello Mastroianni
- Cinematography: Claudio Cirillo
- Release date: 1971
- Running time: 120 minutes
- Country: Italy
- Language: Italian

My Name Is Rocco Papaleo (Italian: Permette? Rocco Papaleo) is a 1971 Italian film directed by Ettore Scola.

== Description ==
The film follows a former boxer from Sicily (Mastroianni) who emigrates to the United States, but rather than success he finds only poverty and loneliness. The film was shot partly in Chicago, and was made while Scola was doing post-production for Trevico-Turin: Voyage in Fiatnam, another "politically engaged" film. It was called "a harsh attack on American consumer values and their soul-destroying materialism".

== Cast ==
- Marcello Mastroianni as Rocco
- Lauren Hutton as Jenny
- Bruce Vilanch
- Brizio Montinaro
- Paola Natale
- Margot Novak
- Tom Reed
- Umberto Travaglini
