= Let's Talk About Women =

- Directed by: Ettore Scola
- Written by: Ruggero Maccari; Ettore Scola
- Starring: Vittorio Gassman
- Cinematography: Alessandro D'Eva
- Music by: Armando Trovajoli
- Release date: 1964
- Language: Italian

Se permettete parliamo di donne (internationally released as Let's Talk About Women) is a 1964 Italian comedy film. It represents the directorial debut of Ettore Scola. The film consists of nine segments, all played by Vittorio Gassman.

== Cast ==
- Vittorio Gassman: Straniero / Practical Joker / Cliente / Amante / Amante impaziente / Cameriere / Fratello timido / Rigattiere / Prigioniero
- Sylva Koscina: Ragazza
- Antonella Lualdi: Fidanzata
- Walter Chiari: Alfredo
- Giovanna Ralli: female escort
- Jeanne Valérie: moglie del prigioniero
- Eleonora Rossi Drago: signora annoiata
- Maria Fiore: Fearful Wife
- Attilio D'Ottesio: Prison Official
- Edda Ferronao: Willing Maid
- Olga Romanelli: Distraught Mother
- Mario Brega
- Gigi Proietti
- Mario Brega
- Riccardo Garrone
- Marco Tulli
- Thea Fleming as Isabella Biancini: girl at Polo Club
