= Goodnight, Ladies and Gentlemen =

1976 Franco-Italian satire film

- French film poster
- Italian: Signore e signori buonanotte
- Directed by: Luigi Comencini; Nanni Loy; Luigi Magni; Mario Monicelli; Ettore Scola; Agenore Incrocci; Furio Scarpelli; Leo Benvenuti; Piero De Bernardi; Ugo Pirro; Ruggero Maccari
- Written by: Leonardo Benvenuti; Luigi Comencini, Piero De Bernardi, Agenore Incrocci, Furio Scarpelli, Luigi Comencini, Mario Monicelli, Nanni Loy, Luigi Magni, Ettore Scola, Ruggero Maccari, Ugo Pirro
- Produced by: Franco Committeri
- Starring: Vittorio Gassman, Ugo Tognazzi, Paolo Villaggio, Marcello Mastroianni, Senta Berger, Adolfo Celi, Carlo Croccolo
- Cinematography: Claudio Ragona
- Edited by: Amedeo Salfa
- Music by: Lucio Dalla and Antonello Venditti
- Release date: 28 October 1976
- Running time: 118 minutes
- Countries: Italy; France
- Language: Italian

Goodnight, Ladies and Gentlemen (Italian: Signore e signori, buonanotte, French: Mesdames et messieurs bonsoir) is a 1976 French-Italian satirical comedy anthology film. It comprises twelve episodes on themes of corruption in various Italian institutions, each by a different writer and director collectively credited as "Cooperativa 15 Maggio". The episodes are a satire of a typical programming day of an Italian public broadcaster, with a fictional TG3 journalist (Marcello Mastroianni) interviewing a number of the other characters. The film stars Vittorio Gassman, Ugo Tognazzi, Nino Manfredi, Paolo Villaggio, Marcello Mastroianni, Senta Berger, Adolfo Celi, and Felice Andreasi.

== Cast ==
- Marcello Mastroianni as Paolo T. Fiume, a fictional television journalist for TG3 news
- Vittorio Gassman as CIA agent / Inspector Tuttunpezzo (dual role)
- Nino Manfredi as Cardinal Felicetto de li Caprettari
- Ugo Tognazzi as the general / the retiree (dual role)
- Paolo Villaggio as Professor Schmidt / quiz presenter (dual role)
- Senta Berger as Signora Palese
- Adolfo Celi as Vladimiro Palese
- Felice Andreasi as valet speaker in Vatican City
- Andréa Ferréol as Edvige
- Sergio Graziani as Cardinal Canareggio
- Monica Guerritore as Paolo's assistant
- Carlo Croccolo as Questore
- Eros Pagni as Commissioner Pertinace
- Mario Scaccia as Cardinal Piazza-Colonna
- Franco Scandurra as Cardinal Decano
- Gianfranco Barra as policeman Nocella
- Renzo Marignano as interviewer in Milan

== Plot ==
The film focuses on various depictions of low corrupt society within Italy in the 1970s. The journalist Paolo T. Fiume (Marcello Mastroianni) is a recurring character between various episodes within the film, in which he interviews a number of different characters.

== Episodes ==
The anthology film comprises twelve episodes:

- Gianni Agnelli kidnapped – A Milanese businessman (a fictionalized Gianni Agnelli) is kidnapped; while interviewed on the news, he declares that his ransom will be deducted from his workers' salaries, citing their "familial bond" as justification.
- One Language for All – The English Lesson – A televised children's English lesson on the names of body parts is aided by an attractive female nude model. A CIA agent approaches her to aid in the assassination of a peace conference delegate, but she kills the agent as she is a spy for a rival agency.
- The Bomb – In a docudrama, a police superintendent and a fire chief evacuate a police station due to a bomb threat, only to find that it was a ticking alarm clock. Not wishing to appear foolish, they set a real bomb to destroy the building but mistakenly kill themselves in the process.
- A City in the Mirror – Naples triptych:
  - Let the Little Children – A documentary shows the Archbishop of Naples publicly rewarding the pregnant mother of a large family for her fertility. Her oldest son has been working to support her and his eight siblings, but the burden becomes too much and he kills himself by jumping from the balcony.
  - We Eat the Children – Following the suicide, a sociologist is interviewed regarding child poverty. The sociologist proposes to solve the overpopulation problem by eating babies of the poor, suggesting various cooking methods.
  - The Four Politicians – A panel discussion with Naples' last four administrators is unable to focus on the city's problems. The four men are revealed to be related and had appointed each other to powerful offices. They attempt to divert the discussion with gibberish and evasion, then lose control and begin tearing apart and eating a model of the city.
- The Retreating General – While waiting to lead his soldiers at a celebratory parade, a general drops one of his medals in a toilet and becomes soiled while retrieving it. He becomes increasingly filthy while trying to remedy this and ultimately shoots himself in the head to avoid humiliation.
- Inspector Tuttumpezzo – A children's show, narrated in rhyme, shows the incorruptible police inspector Tuttumpezzo go to arrest a corrupt politician, who is hosting a party. However, due to deception and bizarre circumstances, Tuttumpezzo fails in his duty and serves as a waiter at the party.
- The Character of the Day – A journalist interviews a homeless retired man who begs and deceives to supplement his tiny pension. He claims that he wants for nothing, but breaks down at the mention of meat because he has not tasted meat in years.
- The Disgrace-o-meter (original: Il Disgraziometro) – A quiz show which rewards the competitor with the greatest misfortunes.
- The Holy Throne – A docudrama examines a historical struggle for the papal throne. Two opposing bishops have most of the college of cardinals killed, then compromise on a seriously ill priest to act as their shared puppet. However, the new pope suddenly recovers, and the bishops regain their faith at this miracle – only to be executed by the pope, who had feigned illness for years in a plot to gain power.
- The Ceremony of the Caryatids – At the Italian Chamber of Deputies, a celebration marks the fourteenth term of President Giovanni Leone, attended by the highest representatives of state and church, many of whom are very elderly and infirm, with a speech given by a man unable to articulate complete sentences. Following an ovation, those assembled suddenly unleash themselves in a lively tarantella folk dance. The broadcast returns to the studio where the host and his assistant share a passionate kiss and end the broadcast with "Ladies and gentlemen, goodnight".

== Production ==
The filmmakers initially credited their work to "Cooperative 15 Maggio" to protect the individual writers, directors and producers from retaliation.
