= Mezzogiorno (surname) =

Mezzogiorno is an Italian surname. Notable people with the surname include:

- Giovanna Mezzogiorno (born 1974), Italian theatre and film actress
- Vittorio Mezzogiorno (1941–1994), Italian actor

== See also ==
- Mezzogiorno
