= The Conspirators (1969 film) =

- Theatrical release poster
- Directed by: Luigi Magni
- Written by: Luigi Magni
- Produced by: Bino Cicogna
- Starring: Nino Manfredi; Enrico Maria Salerno; Claudia Cardinale; Robert Hossein; Renaud Verley; Ugo Tognazzi; Alberto Sordi
- Cinematography: Silvano Ippoliti
- Edited by: Ruggero Mastroianni
- Music by: Armando Trovajoli
- Production companies: Francos Films; Les Films Corona; San Marco
- Distributed by: Euro International Film; Les Films Corona
- Release date: 23 October 1969
- Running time: 120 minutes
- Countries: Italy; France
- Language: Italian
- Box office: £ 3.218.178.000

The Conspirators (Italian: Nell'anno del Signore, French: Les Conspirateurs) is a 1969 Italian-French historical comedy-drama film written and directed by Luigi Magni and starring Nino Manfredi, Enrico Maria Salerno and Claudia Cardinale. It is based on the actual story of the capital execution of two Carbonari in Papal Rome.

The film's sets were designed by the art director Carlo Egidi. Location shooting took place around Rome.

== Plot ==
In Rome in 1825, Cornacchia, a shoemaker, finds out that prince Filippo Spada, a Carbonari associate, is going to reveal the organization's plans for an uprising to the Pontifical Guard's commander, Colonel Nardoni. He then goes off to warn his friend Leonida Montanari, a doctor and the head of the conspirators, who decides to take out the informer. He and Angelo Targhini, a newcomer from the Duchy of Modena, attempt to murder Spada but ultimately fail to deliver the final blow. Spada manages to survive the attack and reports his assailants to the police, who have them both arrested and, after a summary judgement, sentenced to death by Cardinal Rivarola.

Meanwhile, Giuditta, Cornacchia's Jewish workshop assistant, who was previously in love with Montanari, has started to develop feelings for Targhini after first meeting him, unaware of Cornacchia's feelings towards her. While the two Carbonari are imprisoned in Castel Sant'Angelo, an idealist friar is sent to convince them to repent from their sins and states that they cannot be executed until their souls are considered saved. They try to take advantage of that by delaying the execution for as long as possible.

One day, after Giuditta accuses him of cowardice, Cornacchia reveals to her that he is actually Pasquino, the mysterious author of satirical poems against the Pope and the government. Out of his love for Giuditta, he decides to make a deal with Rivarola. He would reveal Pasquino's identity in exchange for the conspirators' lives. Rivarola, who already suspects him, pretends to agree and gives him a note that tells him to personally deliver it to Nardoni at Castel Sant'Angelo to have the prisoners released. The note actually says to arrest him at once, but if Cornacchia were to protest, he would give away that he can actually read, thus confirming Rivarola's suspicions.

The shoemaker, with his disciple Bellachioma, writes a poem in which he asks to hurry the execution of the two Carbonari and explains to his pupil that only their deaths may lead the people to consciousness. Then, after appointing Bellachioma as the new Pasquino, he joins a convent to escape Rivarola's persecution. In the meantime, people from the streets assault Castel Sant'Angelo, which leads Montanari to believe that they will revolt and set them free, but he soon learns that even his fellow citizens want them dead. The friar meets with Rivarola and asks him to delay the execution on the belief that every soul must be saved, but the cardinal just shrugs him off.

Eventually, the execution day comes and, just as the condemned are about to step towards the guillotine, the friar shows up and desperately implores them to repent, but they politely refuse. Refusing to give up, the friar says he is going to absolve them anyway, at the cost of having to deal with God himself, but Rivarola's men stop him from doing so. In the end, Targhini is decapitated and Montanari, before being executed as well, takes one last gaze upon the citizens of Rome gathered in Piazza del Popolo and says, "Good night, people."

== Cast ==
- Nino Manfredi as Cornacchia
- Enrico Maria Salerno as Colonel Nardoni
- Claudia Cardinale as Giuditta Di Castro
- Robert Hossein as Leonida Montanari
- Renaud Verley as Angelo Targhini
- Ugo Tognazzi as Cardinal Agostino Rivarola
- Alberto Sordi as the friar
- Franco Abbina as Prince Filippo Spada
- Britt Ekland as Princess Spada
- Pippo Franco as Bellachioma
- Stefano Oppedisano as a drunken boy

== Production ==
Magni's script was initially rejected by all the major production companies until Giovanna Ralli, Magni's original choice for the role of Giuditta, personally brought it to Fulvio Frizzi, then commercial director of Euro International Film, who in turn submitted it to producer Bino Cicogna for consideration.

== Reception ==
The film was a massive success, grossing over 3 billion lire at the Italian box office.

== Soundtrack ==
Nell'anno del Signore: Original movie soundtrack

Soundtrack album by Armando Trovajoli
- Released: 1969; 1998 (CD reissue)
- Recorded: 1969
- Length: 33:12; 51:59 (CD reissue)
- Labels: Cinevox (MDF 33/26), (CD-MDF 318)

The soundtrack for the movie was composed by Armando Trovajoli.

Nell'anno del Signore Original Soundtrack
No.	Title	Notes	Length
1.	"Nell'anno del Signore" (In the Year of Our Lord)		4:25
2.	"Castel S. Angelo"		3:28
3.	"Paolina"		2:17
4.	"Angelo e Giuditta" (Angelo and Giuditta)		1:52
5.	"I Carbonari" (The Carbonari)		0:57
6.	"Addio" (Farewell)		1:45
7.	"Sotto la ghigliottina" (Under the Guillotine)		1:54
8.	"Ouverture - Nell'anno del Signore" (Ouverture - In the Year of Our Lord)		1:52
9.	"Tema di Giuditta" (Giuditta's Theme)	Vocals by Edda Dell'Orso	2:11
10.	"La processione dei condannati" (The Procession of the Condemned)		2:05
11.	"Dichiarazione d'amore" (Confession of Love)		1:43
12.	"Pasquino"		2:08
13.	"Sapessi quanto amore" (If You Knew How Much Love)		3:09
14.	"Coro della morte" (Choir of Death)		0:54
15.	"Piazza del Popolo"		2:32

1998 CD reissue bonus tracks
No.	Title	Notes	Length
16.	"Nell'anno del Signore (Suite)" (In the Year of Our Lord (Suite))		7:15
17.	"Serenata di Giuditta" (Giuditta's Serenade)	Performed by Armando Trovajoli	11:32
