= La via dei babbuini =

- Directed by: Luigi Magni
- Written by: Luigi Magni; Marino Onorati
- Produced by: Titanus
- Starring: Catherine Spaak
- Cinematography: Franco Di Giacomo
- Edited by: Amedeo Salfa; Ruggiero Mastroianni
- Music by: Armando Trovajoli
- Release date: 1974
- Language: Italian

La via dei babbuini is a 1974 Italian commedia all'italiana film written and directed by Luigi Magni.

== Plot ==
Fiorenza, a young bourgeois woman, lives in Rome with her husband Orazio. The marriage of the two is already quite saturated, even if not outwardly broken: this situation depends as much on the deliberate absence of children, as on psychological and social elements that the two spouses perceive unconsciously and differently. Fiorenza, who has rushed to Massawa to assist her father, an old colonialist she has never even known, sees him die and bury. Left alone, she does not return to her homeland but lets herself be guided by the extravagant Getulio to discover the African mystery. Horace, a cultured man but suffering from chronic infantilism, joins his wife and tries to tear her away from the continent that is almost plagiarizing her. But Fiorenza, after the tragic death of Getulio, goes towards the savannah following the path of the baboons who, unlike men, go up to the plants where the secret of their genuine nature is found.

== Cast ==
- Catherine Spaak as Fiorenza
- Pippo Franco as Getulio
- Fabio Garriba as Orazio
- Lionel Stander as Fiorenza's father
- Rita Calderoni
- Ada Pometti

== See also ==
- List of Italian films of 1974
