= Agostino Rivarola =

Agostino Rivarola or Rivaròla (14 March 1758 – 7 November 1842) was an Italian Roman Catholic cardinal. He is known for his vigorous defence of papal authority during and after the Napoleonic invasion.

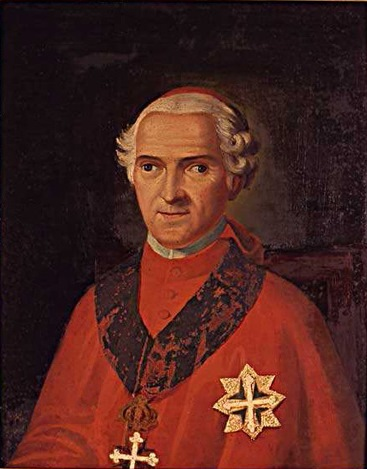
Portrait of the Cardinal

== Biography ==
He was born in Genoa. He may be related to Cardinal Domenico Rivarola (1575-1627). He rose to become governor of San Severino Marche in 1793-1797, then apostolic protonotary in 1800. He fled from French forces until the restoration of Papal authority in 1814. By 1817, he had been named cardinal. During 1824-1826, he pursued Carbonari revolutionaries in the province of Ravenna. Over 500 were imprisoned in 1825, including 5 capital punishments (all commuted). In 1826, he returned to Rome.

However prior to returning to Rome, on 23 July 1826, while his carriage was on the streets of Ravenna, a pair of Carbonari attempted to assassinate him by firing into his cab. A fellow passenger of his entourage, Canon Muti, died from the gunshot. A later investigation under Pope Leo XII was concluded on 26 April 1828 with five death sentences, which putatively were carried out in Ravenna on 13 May 1828. They included Leonida Montanari and Angelo Targhini.

Rivarola participated in the conclave of 1829 and conclave of 1830-1831.

== In the Media ==
Cardinal Rivarola has been played by:

- Ugo Tognazzi in the movie Nell'anno del Signore (1969);
- Nino Manfredi in the movie La Carbonara (2000);
