= Ada Pometti =

Italian film, television and stage actress

- Born: Nunzia Agata Pometti; 13 May 1942 (age 84); Catania, Italy
- Occupation: Actress

Ada Pometti (born Nunzia Agata Pometti; 13 May 1942) is an Italian film, television and stage actress.

== Life and career ==
Born Nunzia Agata Pometti in Catania, Italy, she graduated from the Centro Sperimentale di Cinematografia in Rome, and she worked at the Teatro Stabile di Catania. A character actress, she was sometimes credited with the names Priscilla Benson and Ada Pomeroy.

== Selected filmography ==
- His Name Was King (1971)
- Il sindacalista (1972)
- The Killer Is on the Phone (1972)
- Women in Cell Block 7 (1973)
- Property Is No Longer a Theft (1973)
- La via dei babbuini (1974)
- Commissariato di notturna (1974)
- Il caso Raoul (1975)
- The Exorcist: Italian Style (1975)
- Sex, Demons and Death (1975)
- Savage Three (1975)
- Cagliostro (1975)
- L'Italia s'è rotta (1976)
- Basta che non si sappia in giro (1976)
- Zanna Bianca e il grande Kid (1977)
- Il Capo dei Capi (TV Mini-Series, 2007)
- Il tredicesimo apostolo (TV Series, 2014)
