= Basta che non si sappia in giro =

- Directed by: Luigi Comencini; Nanni Loy; Luigi Magni
- Written by: Age & Scarpelli; Luigi Magni; Nanni Loy; Castellano & Pipolo
- Produced by: Renato Jaboni
- Starring: Nino Manfredi; Monica Vitti
- Cinematography: Luigi Kuveiller; Claudio Ragona; Giuseppe Ruzzolini
- Edited by: Nino Baragli; Franco Fraticelli; Ruggero Mastroianni
- Music by: Armando Trovajoli
- Release date: 26 November 1976
- Running time: 100 minutes
- Country: Italy
- Language: Italian

Basta che non si sappia in giro is a 1976 Italian anthology comedy film directed by Luigi Comencini, Nanni Loy and Luigi Magni. The film obtained a good commercial success.

== Plot ==
In a triptych of events (the first directed by Loy, the second by Magni, the third by Comencini) are analyzed situations and incidents that have sexuality as a common denominator. In the first a scriptwriter/director (Johnny Dorelli), during a busy morning's work with a typist (Monica Vitti), feels more and more attracted to her, and this is increasingly identified with the protagonist 's erotic drama that he makes typing . The second segment sees a jailer (Nino Manfredi) taken hostage during a prison riot, during which the mutineers threaten to sodomize him if they do not receive the visit of the Minister of Justice. The third, played on the register of the comedy of misunderstanding, sees a single accountant with the hobby of model (still Manfredi) to exchange for the call girl who just "ordered" a shy and awkward phone used (again Vitti) responsible for collecting the rate of an encyclopedia.

== Cast ==
=== Macchina d'amore ===
- Monica Vitti: Armanda
- Johnny Dorelli: Antonio Bormioli

=== Il superiore ===
- Nino Manfredi: Enzo Lucarelli
- Vittorio Mezzogiorno: Lupo
- Lino Banfi: Prison governor
- Isa Danieli: Ersilia Lucarelli
- Marzio Honorato: Head of the Revolt
- Luca Sportelli: Barbagliati

=== L'equivoco ===
- Nino Manfredi: Paolo Gallizzi
- Monica Vitti: Lia
- Mauro Vestri: Lia's colleague
- Ada Pometti: Prostitute

== See also ==
- List of Italian films of 1976
