= Down and Dirty (film) =

- Directed by: Ettore Scola
- Written by: Sergio Citti; Ettore Scola; Ruggero Maccari
- Produced by: Carlo Ponti; Romano Dandi
- Starring: Nino Manfredi
- Cinematography: Dario Di Palma
- Edited by: Raimondo Crociani
- Music by: Armando Trovajoli
- Release date: 1976
- Running time: 115 minutes
- Country: Italy
- Language: Italian

Down and Dirty, also known as Ugly, Dirty and Bad (Brutti, sporchi e cattivi) is an Italian film directed by Ettore Scola and released in 1976.

Ettore Scola won the Prix de la Mise en scène at the 1976 Cannes Film Festival.

== Plot ==
The film tells the story of a large Apulian family living in an extremely poor shantytown of the periphery of Rome. The protagonist is one-eyed patriarch Giacinto (Manfredi). Four generations of his sons and relatives are cramped together in his shack, managing to get by mainly on thieving and whoring, among other things more or less respectable.

For the loss of his eye, an insurance company has paid Giacinto a large sum. Giacinto refuses to share his money with anyone, and spends little of it on himself, preferring to hide it from his family, which he routinely abuses verbally and physically. Various members of the family unsuccessfully try to steal his money. When Giacinto falls in love with an obese prostitute, brings her home and starts spending his money on her, Giacinto's enraged wife conspires with the rest of the family to poison him. However, Giacinto survives. In a frenzy of anger, he sets fire to his home. To his disappointment, his family survives.

Giacinto then sells the house to a Neapolitan immigrant family. Giacinto's family refuses to let the Neapolitans take over the shack, and in the ensuing fight, the shack collapses. The film ends with Giacinto living in a newly built exceedingly crowded shack with both his mistress and his wife, together with an apparently reconciled family and the newcomers as well.

== Cast ==
- Nino Manfredi as Giacinto Mazzatella
- Linda Moretti as Matilde
- Francesco Anniballi as Domizio
- Maria Bosco as Gaetana
- Giselda Castrini as Lisetta
- Alfredo D'Ippolito as Plinio
- Giancarlo Fanelli as Paride
- Marina Fasoli as Maria Libera
- Ettore Garofolo as Camillo
- Marco Marsili as Vittoriano
- Franco Merli as Fernando
- Luciano Pagliuca as Romolo
- Giuseppe Paravati as Tato
- Silvana Priori as Paride's wife
- Giovanni Rovini as Grandma Antonecchia
- Adriana Russo as Dora
- Maria Luisa Santella as Iside
- Mario Santella as Adolfo
- Ennio Antonelli as the innkeeper
- Marcella Battisti as Marcella Celhoio
- Francesco Crescimone as the police commissioner
- Beryl Cunningham as the black shack dweller
- Silvia Ferluga as the fortune teller
- Clarisse Monaco as Tommasina
- Zoe Incrocci as Tommasina's mother
- Franco Marino as Father Santandrea
- Marcella Michelangeli as the postal clerk

== Production ==
Initially, the casting approach was a point of discussion, with Scola wanting non-professional actors and producer Carlo Ponti advocating for a cast made of well-known performers, including his wife Sophia Loren. Originally Pier Paolo Pasolini was supposed to appear in the film's prologue, but his death prevented his participation. Principal cinematography started on December 1975, and lasted about six months. The film was shot in a recreated shantytown at Monte Ciocci, north of Rome, with some interiors filmed at De Paolis Studios.

== Reception ==
The film was a major success, grossing nearly 2 billion lire at the Italian box office.
