= Faustina (1968 film) =

- Directed by: Luigi Magni
- Starring: Vonetta McGee
- Cinematography: Roberto Gerardi
- Music by: Armando Trovajoli
- Release date: 11 October 1968
- Language: Italian

Faustina is a 1968 Italian comedy film. It represents the directorial debut of Luigi Magni and the first released film appearance of actress Vonetta McGee, the latter of whom had filmed her role for The Great Silence a year prior.

== Cast ==
- Vonetta McGee: Faustina Ceccarelli
- Enzo Cerusico: Enea Troiani
- Renzo Montagnani: Quirino
- Franco Acampora: Ezio, Quirino's accomplice
- Ottavia Piccolo: Young Peasant
