= The Family (1987 film) =

1987 Italian drama film

La famiglia The Family
- Theatrical release poster
- Directed by: Ettore Scola
- Written by: Ruggero Maccari; Ettore Scola; Furio Scarpelli
- Produced by: Franco Committeri
- Starring: Vittorio Gassman; Stefania Sandrelli; Fanny Ardant; Sergio Castellitto; Athina Cenci; Jo Champa; Massimo Dapporto; Cecilia Dazzi; Hania Kochansky; Dagmar Lassander; Andrea Occhipinti; Alessandra Panelli; Memè Perlini; Ottavia Piccolo; Monica Scattini; Barbara Scoppa; Ricky Tognazzi; Massimo Venturiello; Philippe Noiret; Carlo Dapporto; Renzo Palmer
- Cinematography: Ricardo Aronovich
- Edited by: Francesco Malvestito
- Music by: Armando Trovajoli
- Production companies: Massfilm; Cinecittà; RAI Uno
- Distributed by: United International Pictures
- Release date: 22 January 1987
- Running time: 137 minutes
- Country: Italy
- Language: Italian

The Family (Italian: La famiglia) is a 1987 Italian drama film directed by Ettore Scola and starring Vittorio Gassman, Fanny Ardant, Philippe Noiret, and Stefania Sandrelli. It was entered into the 1987 Cannes Film Festival. The film received an Academy Award nomination for Best Foreign Language Film at the 60th Academy Awards.

The movie chronicles the intricate lives and relationships of Carlo and his family over decades, navigating through love, jealousy, political upheavals, and personal growth against the backdrop of historical events like World War I and II.

== Plot ==
First part (1906)

Carlo's baptism serves as a backdrop to introduce the audience to the household and its initial characters. The patriarch of the family, Carlo's grandfather, a retired literature professor, has recently acquired an apartment. Residing with him and his wife are their son Aristide, Carlo's father, a civil servant and amateur painter; Susanna, Aristide's wife, flighty and passionate about opera; Aristide's sisters, Luisa, Margherita, and Millina, who are constantly bickering but inseparable, resigned to spinsterhood in their thirties; and the maid Nunzia along with her young niece Adelina. Also present at the baptism are Aristide's brother Michele, with his wife Ersilia and son Enrico; Nicola, Susanna's younger brother; and Dr. Giordani, a family friend and physician.

Second part (1916)

Against the background of World War I, Carlo, at the age of ten, along with his three-years-younger brother Giulio and their cousin Enrico, engage in lively play and decide to steal half a lira from Giordani's overcoat, as he rushes to attend to their gravely ill grandfather. Their game is abruptly halted by Susanna, who delivers the news of the grandfather's passing to the children. Subsequently, it is revealed that Giordani was arrested because, lacking that half lira, he couldn't afford tram fare. Aristide becomes incensed and pressures Giulio to confess, while Carlo admits his wrongdoing voluntarily, thus marking the first contrast between the brothers—Carlo being composed and contemplative, Giulio impulsive and restless. A subtle mutual sympathy is hinted at between Millina and Giordani, though it remains undeveloped.

Third part (1926)

Carlo is attending university and giving private lessons to a high school student named Beatrice, who openly harbors affection for him. However, Carlo finds himself drawn to Beatrice's sister Adriana, a conservatory student who coincidentally visits their home. Enrico, a staunch anti-fascist, departs Rome for Paris. Suddenly, Aristide dies. Adriana confides in Carlo her intention to pursue an advanced course in Milan, despite his wishes to the contrary, valuing her independence above all else.

Fourth part (1936)

Carlo, now a high school teacher, is married with two children, Paolino and Maddalena; his wife being Beatrice. They receive a visit from Uncle Nicola, a fascist who holds the position of municipal secretary in Macerata. Even Giulio sympathizes with the regime and prepares to depart for the Ethiopian War, despite Adelina's concerns; she has served in their household for years and is romantically involved with him. In contrast, Carlo holds opposing views and, while avoiding active involvement in politics, symbolically abstains from joining the fascist party. Adriana, now a successful concert pianist, calls from Paris, where she claims to have encountered Enrico married to a French woman with a child.

Fifth part (1946)

Giulio returns from the war physically unharmed but suffering from severe depression, while news arrives that Enrico died in combat in Spain. Adriana revisits the family, accompanied by her French fiancé, Jean-Luc. During dinner, Carlo, blinded by jealousy toward Adriana, engages in a confrontation with Jean-Luc, despite their shared ideologies; Beatrice's calming intervention diffuses the tension. Amidst the wartime hardships, Adelina resigns from her domestic position and turns to the black market with her brothers. One day, she returns to the household bearing various food items as gifts and expresses a desire to see Giulio again, moved by his condition.

Sixth part (1956)

As summer approaches, the family prepares for a trip to Santa Marinella. Aunt Millina has died, Giulio has wed Adelina, and they have adopted a girl named Marina. Giulio seeks his brother's opinion on an autobiographical novel he intends to publish, though Carlo dismisses its significance. Adriana, passing through Rome, spends a night in the vacant household but rebuffs Carlo's attempt to rekindle their past romance, refusing to be a mistress out of respect for her sister and acknowledging Carlo's reliance on Beatrice's steadfast presence. Meanwhile, Maddalena, just over twenty, falls in love with a union leader named Armando, insisting on marrying him despite her father's objections. During a winter night marked by an unusual heavy snowfall in Rome, Carlo confides his love and respect for Beatrice to her, while in the adjacent room, Armando and Maddalena, newlyweds, already exhibit signs of discord. The final scene bids farewell to Luisa, Margherita, and Susanna, who are all afflicted by dementia, spending their time in another room reciting opera librettos.

Seventh part (1966)

Amid preparations for his son Carletto's eighth birthday celebration, Maddalena announces her intention to leave Armando for another man. At the party, Paolino meets Marika, a Hungarian woman separated with children who resides in the neighboring building. Juliette, Enrico's widow, along with her daughter Claudine and granddaughter, also named Juliette, make an appearance, as does Giulio and Adelina, grappling with financial woes; Uncle Nicola arrives as well. Giulio suspects that his uncle intends to ask him for the money he had previously lent him, leading to an unwarranted altercation.

Eighth part (1976)

Carlo, now a widower in retirement, resides alone with Carletto, who, despite his close bond with his grandfather, frequently spends time away. Paolino has married Marika, and the couple invites Carlo to dinner from their balcony across the street, though he politely declines. Adriana also checks in on Carlo, revealing that Beatrice was aware of their tumultuous history but chose to remain silent for the sake of the family.

Ninth part (1986)

Carlo gathers his relatives to celebrate his eightieth birthday. As each family member arrives—Giulio, Adelina, Marina (now a mother), Paolino, Marika and their children, Maddalena with her second family, Armando, Juliette, Claudine, the other Juliette, Adriana, and many others whose connections to the protagonists are unclear—they come together for a group photograph. Hints of a budding relationship between Carletto and his third cousin Juliette emerge. Despite final disagreements with Adriana and Giulio, the entire family joins in for the commemorative photo.

== Cast ==
- Vittorio Gassman as Carlo / Carlo's grandfather
- Stefania Sandrelli as Beatrice
- Andrea Occhipinti as young Carlo
- Fanny Ardant as Adrian
- Philippe Noiret as Jean Luc
- Carlo Dapporto as Giulio
- Massimo Dapporto as young Giulio
- Sergio Castellitto as Carletto
- Ricky Tognazzi as Paolino
- Ottavia Piccolo as Adelina
- Athina Cenci as Aunt Margherita
- Emanuele Lamaro as child Carlo
- Cecilia Dazzi as young Beatrice
- Jo Champa as young Adriana
- Joska Versari as child Giulio
- Alberto Gimignani as young Giulio
- Dagmar Lassander as Marika

== Reception ==
The Family has an approval rating of 71% on review aggregator website Rotten Tomatoes, based on seven reviews, and an average rating of 7.5/10.

=== Awards and nominations ===
The film won five David di Donatello awards, six Nastro d'Argento awards, and it was an Academy Award nominee as Best Foreign Language film.

== See also ==
- List of submissions to the 60th Academy Awards for Best Foreign Language Film
- List of Italian submissions for the Academy Award for Best Foreign Language Film
