= Mario Scaccia =

Italian actor and author

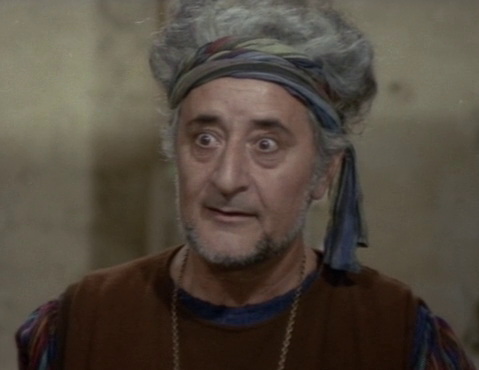
- Scaccia in La calandria (1972)
- Born: 26 December 1919; Rome, Italy
- Died: 26 January 2011 (aged 91); Rome, Italy
- Occupations: Actor, author
- Height: 1.80 m (5 ft 11 in)

Mario Scaccia (26 December 1919 – 26 January 2011) was an Italian actor and author. He was a prominent figure in the Italian theatre of '900.

== Biography ==
Born in Rome, the son of a painter, during the Second World War Scaccia was conscripted into the army as an officer in Sicily; made prisoner by the American army, he was taken in Morocco, where he remained three years. In 1945 Scaccia returned to Rome, where he abandoned his studies in pedagogy and enrolled at the Accademia Nazionale di Arte Drammatica Silvio D'Amico, attending only the first year; in 1946 he started appearing on stage, usually as character actor. In 1961 Scaccia was co-founder, together with Valeria Moriconi, Franco Enriquez and Glauco Mauri, of the Compagnia dei Quattro ("Company of the Four") that gained critical and commercial success. At the same time Scaccia was a prolific character actor in films, TV series and radio-dramas.

Scaccia was also an author and a poet; his works include several autobiographies. He died in Rome at 91, as a result of complications for a surgical intervention.

== Selected filmography ==
- The Flame (1952) - Mauret
- A Slice of Life (1954) - (segment "Scena all'aperto")
- Too Bad She's Bad (1955) - Carletto, l'uomo derubato della borsa
- Lucky to Be a Woman (1956) - Un cameriere
- Il Mattatore (1960) - Il gioielliere
- The Traffic Policeman (1960) - Mayor's lawyer (uncredited)
- Femmine di lusso (1960) - Edmondo, the butler
- Revenge of the Barbarians (1960) - Onorius, Emperor of the West
- Robin Hood and the Pirates (1960) - Jonathan Brooks
- Ursus (1961) - Kymos
- Behind Closed Doors (1961) - Manning, l'albergatore
- Day by Day, Desperately (1961) - Orderly
- The Seventh Sword (1962) - Il Cardinale / The Cardinal
- Musketeers of the Sea (1962) - Re di Francia
- Avventura al motel (1963) - Manfredi
- The Swindlers (1963) - Lawyer (segment "Medico e fidanzata")
- Shivers in Summer (1964) - The Manager of 'Carrousel' Show
- Amore facile (1964) - Cante Bardi-Stucchi (segment "Divorzio italo-americano")
- Oltraggio al pudore (1964)
- Me, Me, Me... and the Others (1966) - Guidarino, Journalist
- A Maiden for the Prince (1966) - Cardinal Gonzaga
- We Still Kill the Old Way (1967) - Prete
- Giacomo Casanova: Childhood and Adolescence (1969) - Doctor Zambelli
- Between Miracles (1971) - Priore
- Meo Patacca (1972) - Cardinale
- Il generale dorme in piedi (1972) - Gen. Arturo Pigna
- The Adventures of Pinocchio (1972) - 1° Dottore
- La calandria (1972) - Ruffo
- Property Is No Longer a Theft (1973) - Alessandro Marzo 'Albertone'
- The Perfume of the Lady in Black (1974) - Signor Rossetti
- I'll Take Her Like a Father (1974) - Don Amilcare De Loyola
- The Antichrist (1974) - Faith Healer
- The Sex Machine (1975) - Mons. Alberoni
- Eye of the Cat (1975) - Salomone Fioravanti
- Lezioni di violoncello con toccata e fuga (1976) - Leopoldo
- Soldier of Fortune (1976) - Don Pedro Gonzalo de Guadarrama
- Goodnight, Ladies and Gentlemen (1976) - Cardinal Piazza-Colonna
- Un amore targato Forlì (1976)
- Black Journal (1977) - Rosario
- Double Murder (1977) - Marino Cianciarelli
- Break Up (1978) - Il dottore
- The Word (1978, TV Mini-Series) - Agusto Monti
- Occhio, malocchio, prezzemolo e finocchio (1983) - Corinto Marchialla
- Il mistero del morca (1984)
- Juke box (1985)
- L'ultima mazurka (1986) - Reiger
- Secondo Ponzio Pilato (1987) - Tiberio
- In camera mia (1992)
- Ferdinando and Carolina (1999) - Ferdinando I Borbone (old)
- Voglio stare sotto al letto (1999) - Giò Giordani
- Gabriel (2001)

== Bibliography ==
- Mario Scaccia, Il Diario dell'Anima, 1969
- Mario Scaccia, Un disperato amore, 1972
- Mario Scaccia, Zio cardinale, 1974
- Mario Scaccia, Quattro mesi in platea, 1977
- Mario Scaccia, Io e il teatro, 1978
- Giovanni Giràud, Mario Scaccia, Il galantuomo per transazione, 1980
- Mario Scaccia, L'antologia rifatta, 1981
- Mario Scaccia, La verità inventata. Del mestiere dell'arte dell'attore, 1989
- Mario Scaccia, Il mio Molière, 1994
- Paolo Perrone Burali d'Arezzo, Mario Scaccia, Mario Verdone, Totò e Onorato, 1999
- Mario Scaccia, Due braccia e una lira, 2004
- Mario Scaccia, Interpretando la mia vita. Il mio teatro, i miei personaggi, la mia storia, 2009
- Mario Scaccia, Maschere romane, 2010
- Mario Scaccia, Per amore di una rima, 2011
