= Nemici d'infanzia =

- Directed by: Luigi Magni
- Written by: Luigi Magni Carla Vistarini
- Cinematography: Roberto D'Ettorre Piazzoli
- Music by: Nicola Piovani
- Release date: 1995
- Language: Italian

Nemici d'infanzia is a 1995 Italian comedy drama film written by Luigi Magni and Carla Vistarini and directed by Luigi Magni. The film won the David di Donatello for Best Script.

== Cast ==
- Renato Carpentieri: Corsini
- Paolo Murano: Paolo
- Giorgia Tartaglia: Luciana
- Nicola Russo: Marco
