= La Carbonara =

- Directed by: Luigi Magni
- Written by: Luigi Magni
- Produced by: Letizia Colonna; Massimo Ferrero
- Starring: Lucrezia Lante Della Rovere; Valerio Mastandrea; Fabrizio Gifuni; Claudio Amendola; Nino Manfredi
- Cinematography: Danilo Desideri; Pino De Valeri
- Edited by: Fernanda Indoni
- Music by: Nicola Piovani
- Release date: 2000
- Running time: 108 min
- Country: Italy
- Language: Italian

La Carbonara is a 2000 Italian period comedy-drama film written and directed by Luigi Magni.

== Plot ==
Roman Campagna, early 1800. Cecilia is a commoner who runs an inn, where the specialty is the spaghetti alla carbonara. Moreover, the woman is tied to the movement of young patriots, named "Carbonari", who want a united Italy, and are struggling against the power of the pope. Cecilia believes she lost her husband in a fatal accident, and has made a new lover: Fabrizio, who is also a patriot. One day the guy's saved by a monk, when he is about to be imprisoned by the soldiers of Cardinal Rivarola. The monk is the husband of Cecilia, not dead in the accident, and now he helps her to fight against the power of Rome with the Carbonari.

== Cast ==
- Lucrezia Lante della Rovere: Cecilia, la Carbonara
- Valerio Mastandrea: Fabrizio
- Nino Manfredi: Cardinal Rivarola
- Claudio Amendola: Lupone
- Pierfrancesco Favino: The sergeant
- Fabrizio Gifuni: Zaccaria
