= The Orderly (1961 film) =

- Directed by: Giorgio Bianchi
- Written by: Marcello Marchesi; Luigi Magni; Stefano Strucchi
- Cinematography: Alvaro Mancori
- Music by: Armando Trovajoli
- Release date: 1962
- Language: Italian

The Orderly (Italian: Gli attendenti) is a 1961 Italian comedy film directed by Giorgio Bianchi.

== Cast ==
- Vittorio De Sica: Colonel Filippo Bitossi
- Renato Rascel: Remigio De Acutis
- Dorian Gray: Lauretta
- Gino Cervi: Maggiore Penna
- Didi Perego: Valeria Bitossi
- Andreina Pagnani: Madre di Osvaldo
- Luigi Pavese: Colonel Terenzi
- Vicky Ludovici: Nunziatina
- Vittorio Congia: Domenico Damiani
- Lelio Luttazzi: Lt. Marchetti
- Franco Giacobini
- Ciccio Barbi
- Olimpia Cavalli
