= Unfair Competition (film) =

2001 Italian drama film

- Directed by: Ettore Scola
- Written by: Furio Scarpelli; Ettore Scola; Silvia Scola; Giacomo Scarpelli
- Produced by: Franco Committeri
- Starring: Diego Abatantuono; Sergio Castellitto; Gérard Depardieu
- Cinematography: Franco Di Giacomo
- Edited by: Raimondo Crociani
- Music by: Armando Trovajoli
- Release date: 23 February 2001
- Running time: 110 minutes
- Country: Italy
- Language: Italian

Unfair Competition (Italian: Concorrenza sleale) is a 2001 Italian drama film directed by Ettore Scola. It was filmed in Cinecittà and some of its sets were used by Martin Scorsese in Gangs of New York, as Ettore Scola said in Néstor Birri's book.

== Plot ==
Rome 1938, Umberto (Diego Abatantuono) and Leone (Sergio Castellitto) own adjacent clothing stores, on the same street. Umberto is Catholic, Leone is Jewish. Racial Laws are approved in Italy in 1938 after Hitler's visit to Rome (see also Ettore Scola's A Special Day).

== Cast ==
- Diego Abatantuono as Umberto Melchiorri
- Sergio Castellitto as Leone Della Rocca
- Gérard Depardieu as Professor Angelo
- Antonella Attili as Giuditta Della Rocca
- Jean-Claude Brialy as Grandad Mattia Della Rocca
- Claude Rich as Count Treuberg
- Elio Germano as Paolo Melchiorri
- Sabrina Impacciatore as Matilde
- Rolando Ravello as Ignazietto Paspinelli
- Claudio Bigagli as Commissioner Collegiani
- Emanuele Salce as agent Tramontana

== Awards ==
- 23rd Moscow International Film Festival Best Director
- 6 Nastro d'Argento nominations
- David di Donatello Best Production Design
