= Vittorio Mezzogiorno =

Italian actor (1941–1994)

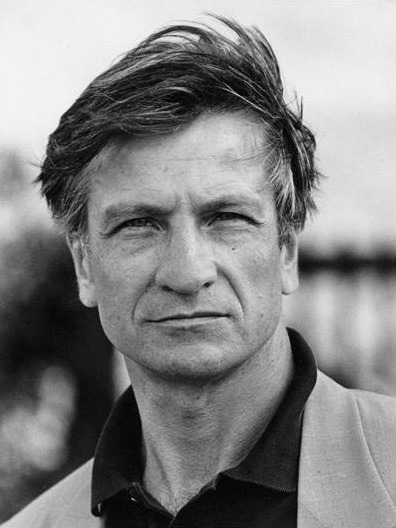
- Vittorio Mezzogiorno in 1989
- Born: 16 December 1941; Cercola, Italy
- Died: 7 January 1994 (aged 52); Milan, Italy
- Occupation: Actor
- Spouse: Cecilia Sacchi
- Children: Giovanna Mezzogiorno, Marina Mezzogiorno Brown

Vittorio Mezzogiorno (16 December 1941 – 7 January 1994) was an Italian actor.

== Biography ==
Mezzogiorno was born in Cercola, the youngest of seven children. His older brother Vincenzo, who wanted to become a director, introduced him to the theatre.

At 18, Mezzogiorno enrolled at the university and began medical studies before choosing law. Then he had his first experience as an actor at the Teatro S. theatre where he recited texts by Samuel Beckett and Eugène Ionesco. Desiring to improve his diction he spent long nights exercising his voice with extracts of the Penal Code. In 1962, at age 21, he played Estragon in Waiting for Godot at the "Piccolo Teatro" of Naples.

In 1966–1967, he joined the troupe of Eduardo De Filippo and obtained his university diploma. In 1969, he met actress Cecilia Sacchi. Their collaboration quickly turned to a romantic relationship and they were married on 14 October 1972. On 9 November 1974, their only child Giovanna Mezzogiorno, who also became an actress, was born.

The family then settled in Rome where Mezzogiorno fully dedicated himself to the theatre.

In 1983, Jean-Jacques Beineix opened the doors of French cinema with Moon in the Gutter where he acted alongside Gérard Depardieu and Nastassja Kinski, but the real recognition came the same year in L'Homme blessé, a film by Patrice Chéreau, where he played Jean, a gay hustler. Meanwhile, Mezzogiorno moved to Paris.

More than ten hours of entertainment, a year of rehearsals, six months of training in martial arts: the challenge of Peter Brooks Mahabharata, transcription of the long epic of Hindu mythology. Mezzogiorno was Arjuna, the son of Indra. It was first performed at the Boulbon Quarry in 1985 at the Festival d'Avignon and lasted all night. After a show at the Bouffes du Nord, it went on tour until the end of 1986 (Athens, Prato, Barcelona, Madrid and Lyon). The Mahabharata in English was back on the road in 1988: Zurich, Los Angeles, New York, Perth, Adelaide, Copenhagen, Glasgow, and finally Tokyo. In 1989, the movie adaptation was produced. In all, Mezzogiorno played Arjuna for 6 years on 4 continents.

In 1990, Vittorio Mezzogiorno returned to Italy and settled in Milan. He became a star of the small screen by interpreting the Commissioner Davide Licata in the series La piovra which deals with the Mafia. In 1992, he and his wife acted together at the Teatro Stabile di Parma. These were to be his last appearances.

He died of cancer in Milan at the age of 52.

== Filmography ==
- 1959: Audace colpo dei soliti ignoti (by Nanni Loy) - Arresting Officer (uncredited)
- 1972: Il caso Pisciotta (by Eriprando Visconti) - Agente Beretta
- 1973: Non ho tempo (by Ansano Giannarelli)
- 1975: La Cecilia (by Jean-Louis Comolli) - Luigi
- 1975: Il marsigliese (by Giacomo Battiato)
- 1976: Extra (TV Mini-Series, by Daniele D'Anza) - Tom Hyers
- 1976: Basta che non si sappia in giro (by Luigi Magni) - Lupo (segment "Il superiore")
- 1976: Bloody Payroll (by Mario Caiano) - Walter
- 1976: La Orca (by Eriprando Visconti)
- 1977: Stunt Squad (by Domenico Paolella) - Valli
- 1977: L'uomo di Corleone (by Duilio Coletti)
- 1979: Il Giorni dei Cristalli (TV Movie, by Giacomo Battiato) - Michele Paita
- 1979: A Dangerous Toy (by Giuliano Montaldo) - Sauro
- 1979: Martin Eden (Italian TV series by Giacomo Battiato) - Cheeseface
- 1980: Speed Cross (by Stelvio Massi) - Nicola
- 1980: Cafè Express (by Nanni Loy) - Amitrano, altro borsaiolo
- 1980: Desideria: la vita interiore (by Gianni Barcelloni) - Erostrato
- 1980: Arrivano i bersaglieri (by Luigi Magni) - Alfonso
- 1980: Doppio sogno dei Sigg X (by Anna Maria Tato)
- 1981: Three Brothers (by Francesco Rosi) - Rocco Giuranna / Young Donato
- 1981: Car Crash (by Antonio Margheriti) - Nick
- 1981: E noi non faremo karakiri (by Francesco Longo) - Matteo
- 1981: The Fall of the Rebel Angels (by Marco Tullio Giordana) - Vittorio
- 1982: Un asila al Patibulo (by Giuliana Berlinguer)
- 1983: Moon in the Gutter (by Jean-Jacques Beineix) - Newton Channing - le frère à la dérive de Loretta
- 1983: Nostalgia (by Andrei Tarkovsky) - (uncredited)
- 1983: The House of the Yellow Carpet (by Carlo Lizzani) - Antonio
- 1983: L'Homme blessé (by Patrice Chéreau) - Jean Lerman
- 1984: Les Cavaliers de l'orage (by Gérard Vergez) - Gorian
- 1984: La Garce (by Christine Pascal) - Max Halimi
- 1985: Un foro nel parabrezza (by Sauro Scavolini) - Eugenio
- 1987: Fuegos (by Alfredo Arias) - El Gringo
- 1987: Jenatsch (by Daniel Schmid) - Jörg Jenatsch
- 1988: Contrainte par corps (by Serge Leroy) - Kasta
- 1989: La Révolution française (by Robert Enrico) - Jean-Paul Mara, dit Marat
- 1989: The Mahabharata (TV Mini-Series, by Peter Brook) - Arjuna
- 1991: The Conviction (by Marco Bellocchio) - Lorenzo Colajanni
- 1991: Scream of Stone (by Werner Herzog) - Roccia Innerkofler
- 1991: Reflections in a Dark Sky (by Salvatore Maira)
- 1992: Golem, the Spirit of the Exile (by Amos Gitai) - Le Maharal
- 1992: Hors saison (by Daniel Schmid) - Uncle Paul
- 1993: Caccia alle mosche (by Angelo Longoni) - (final film role)

== Awards ==
- 1979: Nastro d'Argento for Il Giocattolo
- 1981: Nastro d'Argento for Tre Fratelli
- 1990: Ciak d'Oro for Scream of Stone
