= Mario, Maria and Mario =

- Theatrical release poster
- Directed by: Ettore Scola
- Written by: Ettore Scola; Silvia Scola
- Starring: Giulio Scarpati
- Cinematography: Luciano Tovoli
- Edited by: Raimondo Crociani
- Music by: Armando Trovajoli
- Distributed by: United International Pictures
- Release date: 5 February 1993
- Running time: 102 minutes
- Country: Italy
- Language: Italian

Mario, Maria and Mario (Italian: Mario, Maria e Mario) is a 1993 Italian drama film written and directed by Ettore Scola.

== Plot ==
Two young communist spouses, Mario and Maria Boschi, lead an ordinary life of work: he in the newspaper "L'Unità", she in a haberdashery, a little tense, like many, for the often urged need to reconcile the inexorable work commitments with the care and schedules of two very young children. To disturb the daily routine of the two is the crisis that arises within the local section of their party at the time of the Achille Occhetto's proposal to change name and symbol of the Italian Communist Party. Mario is for the yes, Mary for the no, and political disagreement risks to break the conjugal harmony. This risk is accentuated when in section another Mario makes an unadorned but convinced intervention in favor of the no.

== Cast ==
- Giulio Scarpati as Mario Boschi
- Valeria Cavalli as Maria Boschi
- Enrico Lo Verso as Mario Della Rocca
- Laura Betti as Laura
- Willer Bordon
- Rosa Ferraiolo
- Bedy Moratti
- Rocco Mortelliti

== See also ==
- List of Italian films of 1993
