= Scipio the African =

1971 film

Scipio the African (Scipione detto anche l'Africano)
- Film poster
- Directed by: Luigi Magni
- Written by: Luigi Magni
- Produced by: Ultra Film, Cinerama
- Starring: Marcello Mastroianni
- Cinematography: Arturo Zavattini
- Edited by: Ruggero Mastroianni; Amedeo Salfa
- Music by: Severino Gazzelloni
- Release date: 1971
- Running time: 114 minutes
- Country: Italy
- Language: Italian

Scipio the African (Italian: Scipione detto anche l'Africano, lit. 'Scipio, also called the African') is a 1971 Italian comedy film directed by Luigi Magni.

== Plot ==
Years after the Second Punic War, Scipio Africanus finds himself generally unliked, despite his defeat of Hannibal, many years earlier. He and his brother, Scipio Asiaticus, are accused by Marcus Porcius Cato of the theft of 500 talents intended for Rome. As his friends and loved ones abandon him, Scipio finds life after war not as easy as he thought it would be.

== Cast ==
- Marcello Mastroianni as Scipio Africanus
- Silvana Mangano as Aemilia
- Vittorio Gassman as Cato the Elder
- Ruggero Mastroianni as Lucius Cornelius Scipio Asiaticus
- Turi Ferro as Giove Capitolino
- Woody Strode as Masinissa
- Fosco Giachetti as Aulio Gellio
- Ben Ekland as Tiberius Sempronius Gracchus
- Enzo Fiermonte as Senator Quinto
- Philippe Hersent as Consul Marcello
- Wendy D'Olive as Licia
- Adolfo Lastretti as Carneade
- Ezio Marano as Gaio Scribonio
- Gianni Solaro as Senator
