= La Tosca (1973 film) =

- Directed by: Luigi Magni
- Written by: Victorien Sardou (play), Luigi Magni (story and screenplay)
- Produced by: Ugo Tucci
- Starring: Monica Vitti, Gigi Proietti, Vittorio Gassman, Aldo Fabrizi
- Cinematography: Franco Di Giacomo
- Edited by: Ruggero Mastroianni
- Music by: Armando Trovajoli
- Distributed by: Titanus
- Release date: 1973
- Running time: 104 minutes
- Country: Italy
- Languages: Italian, Roman dialect

La Tosca (also known as Tosca) is a 1973 Italian comedy drama film written and directed by Luigi Magni. It is loosely based on the drama with the same name by Victorien Sardou, reinterpreted in an ironic-grotesque style.

== Plot ==
Rome, 14 June 1800. Napoleon's army threatens to conquer Italy, including the Papal States. Rome is reeking with corruption, especially among the clergy, determined to retain their privileges based on the exploitation of the poor.

The fugitive patriot Cesare Angelotti, escaped from Castel Sant'Angelo, is sheltered by painter Mario Cavaradossi. Baron Scarpia, regent of the Pontifical Police, hunts him down by luring Floria Tosca, Cavaradossi's mistress, into thinking that her lover is cheating on her. The woman, trailed by Scarpia, heads for Cavaradossi's house, hoping to catch him in the act, but finds him in Angelotti's company. Realizing she's been deceived, Tosca tries her best to save her lover, but it is too late. Scarpia reaches the house and surprises Angelotti, who commits suicide rather than being taken in.

Scarpia then arrests the painter for high treason. Lusting after Tosca, the baron blackmails her: he will have the painter freed if she yields to his sexual advances. She accepts, whereupon he makes a show of ordering his minions to have the painter shot with blanks. The letter of safe conduct written, Scarpia is then stabbed by Tosca, who then bolts off to Castel Sant'Angelo to be reunited with her lover. However, Cavaradossi is executed for real, and Tosca, in despair, throws herself off the ramparts of the castle.

Life in Rome continues seemingly unchanged, with the clergy oblivious to the new times looming, and the changes about to overtake the world.

== Cast ==
- Gigi Proietti: Mario Cavaradossi
- Monica Vitti: Floria Tosca
- Umberto Orsini: Cesare Angelotti
- Vittorio Gassman: Baron Scarpia
- Fiorenzo Fiorentini: Brigadier Spoletta
- Gianni Bonagura: Brigadier Sciarrone
- Aldo Fabrizi: Governor
- Marisa Fabbri: the Queen of Naples
- Ninetto Davoli: Horseman
