= The Dinner (1998 film) =

- Directed by: Ettore Scola
- Written by: Ettore Scola; Furio Scarpelli; Silvia Scola; Giacomo Scarpelli
- Starring: Fanny Ardant; Antonio Catania; Francesca D'Aloja; Riccardo Garrone; Vittorio Gassman; Giancarlo Giannini; Marie Gillain; Nello Mascia; Adalberto Maria Merli; Eros Pagni; Daniela Poggi; Rolando Ravello; Stefania Sandrelli
- Cinematography: Franco Di Giacomo
- Edited by: Raimondo Crociani
- Music by: Armando Trovajoli
- Release date: 1998
- Country: Italy
- Language: Italian

La cena, internationally released as The Dinner, is a 1998 Italian comedy film directed by Ettore Scola.

For their performance the male ensemble cast won the Nastro d'Argento for Nastro d'Argento for Best Supporting Actor, while Stefania Sandrelli won the Nastro d'Argento for Best Supporting Actress.

== Cast ==
- Fanny Ardant : Flora
- Antonio Catania : Mago Adam
- Francesca D'Aloja : Alessandra
- Riccardo Garrone : Diomede
- Vittorio Gassman : Maestro Pezzullo
- Giancarlo Giannini : Professore
- Marie Gillain : Allieva
- Nello Mascia : Menghini
- Adalberto Maria Merli : Bricco
- Stefania Sandrelli : Isabella
- Lea Gramsdorff: Sabrina
- Corrado Olmi: Arturo, husband of Flora
- Eros Pagni: Duilio
- Daniela Poggi: the stranger
- Giorgio Tirabassi: Franco
- Giorgio Colangeli: Vincenzo Petrosillo
- Francesca Rerrondini as Mirelia
