= The Devil in Love (film) =

L'arcidiavolo The Devil in Love
- Directed by: Ettore Scola
- Based on: Belfagor arcidiavolo by Niccolò Machiavelli
- Produced by: Mario Cecchi Gori
- Starring: Vittorio Gassman; Claudine Auger; Mickey Rooney
- Cinematography: Aldo Tonti
- Music by: Armando Trovajoli
- Release date: 1966
- Country: Italy
- Language: Italian

The Devil in Love (Italian: L'arcidiavolo) is a 1966 Italian fantasy comedy film. It stars Vittorio Gassman and Gabriele Ferzetti. It is loosely based on the tale Belfagor arcidiavolo by Niccolò Machiavelli.

== Plot ==
The new peace between Rome and Florence worries Ades in hell, who anticipates a reduction in the number of damned souls with the cease fire. He decides to send on Earth among the mortals his archdevil Beelphegor, disguised as a human and assisted by the invisible lower demon Adrammelech, to sabotage the peace and renew hostilities between the Pope and the Signoria.

Beelphegor starts his mission, improvising his first moves and indulging to curiosity toward experiencing carnal pleasure like eating, drinking, and sleeping with women - vices which as a spiritual entity he had been using to tempt humans over the centuries, but he could not really understand, until this first occasion to have a physical body. Even in human form, he retains nevertheless his powers to cheat in gambling, hypnotize and seduce women at first sight, strength, pyrokinesis and resistance to fire.

He meets by chance the pope's young pupil, the noble Francesco Cibo dell'Anguillara who is returning to Italy after completing his education in France in order to marry the daughter of Lorenzo de' Medici, the young and beautiful Maddalena de' Medici. This arranged marriage among strangers is supposed to seal the recent peace agreements between the two local powers. Beelphegor easily beats Francesco in an escalating sequence of card gambles, winning all his money, baggage, and finally (after a moment of hesitation) even his life.

The following morning, upon arrival of the envoy sent by the pope to meet his pupil mid-way and officially escort him to Florence, the Archdevil uses his winnings to impersonate Cibo. The group reaches Florence and Cibo immediately charms Lorenzo and all his court, with only two exceptions. Maddalena is willing to obey her father's plans for an arranged marriage motivated by politics, but she clearly affirms her independent character, promising the future husband neither love nor blind obedience. Gianfiliazzo, the leader of Lorenzo's army and guards, is instead envious of Cibo because of his own love for Maddalena, which does not have a chance due to the disparity in social rank and her already arranged marriage with the Roman noble.

This plan proceeds almost to the end of the ceremony, until Beelphegor suddenly refuses Maddalena as his wife in front of the bishop and the whole court. His courtship was a ruse, embraced to provoke Florence into resuming hostilities against Rome by means of the public insult of an inexplicable last-moment change of heart. Gianfigliazzo is among the first ones to react, and he tries with his men to capture the archdevil. Beelphegor however escapes easily, taking advantage of both Adrammelech's invisible and supernatural assistance, and of the innovative war machines and other engineering marvels by Leonardo da Vinci.

Although most of the Florentine court seems driven to avenge the provocation with a new war, the wise Lorenzo is wary of the danger to give up the peace, weakening through further infight both the two small Italian city-states, until some stronger foreign power could invade the whole country. He is willing therefore to forgive the offense received as a father and as chief-of-state. Only Adrammelech's tricks manage to barely push Florence' council vote back into war.

With this, the goal of Ades' mission is achieved ahead of the assigned schedule. Beelphegor however decides to use his remaining days as a mortal, in order to pursue his own personal agenda of seducing Maddalena as well: he had been impressed by her strength of character, and refuses to leave without adding her too to his list of conquests. The archdevil secretly returns to Lorenzo's palace and, convinced to have finally charmed Maddalena too with his powers, arranges for a night of love together when everybody else is asleep. Maddalena seems to be expecting him, but in reality has warned Gianfigliazzo and his guards about the meeting. They bring Beelphegor to prison, but he is just entertained by the new experience, and impressed by Maddalena's smart trick. On the other hand, he feels now even more challenged and decides not to leave Earth before regaining the upper hand with the woman.

His revenge is to publicly announce that he will expose her naked in front of the entire town population on the following day. Everybody declare skepticism toward the boisterous claim, but people gather nevertheless in large number and far ahead of the scheduled time, in order not to miss the promised exhibition. Beelphegor easily escapes from prison, Gianfigliazzo and his men reinforce their guard to Lorenzo's palace and Maddalena's rooms in particular. As the time for her humiliation gets nearer, a friar tries to preach among the awaiting spectators and convince them not to be tempted and to return home, but nobody follows the advice. Suddenly Beelphegor steals the friar's clothes and, under pretension of giving up on the general populace and lend instead his spiritual support directly to Maddalena, easily enters Lorenzo's palace in spite of all the guards.

Upon reaching Maddalena's rooms, another comical standoff between the two begins. Maddalena resists the archdevil's seduction, and he tricks her into abandoning her clothes by setting them on fire - although stopping short of actually harming her. Shocked, the woman indeed appears naked at the window in plain sight of everybody. Beelphegor has won and is now willing to leave, promising her however no further harm. He escapes again easily from the furious Gianfigliazzo, this time passing through a secret passage in the bedroom of one of Lorenzo's many lovers, and again one of the genial but still untested machines of Leonardo to fly away above the crowd.

The next day represents the end of Beelphegor's time on Earth, according to Ades' mission and strict rules. The archdevil is about to return to hell through a portal at an isolated countryside crossroad, when he is attacked by a man in armor. Being unable to see his face due the helmet, he assumes him to be Gianfigliazzo and decides therefore to further delay until the last moment his travel back to hell. Beelphegor wants to beat the military man a final time, before finishing his experience as a man.

In the ensuing fight, he easily wins but stops just before delivering a fatal blow, to actually see his opponent. In reality, this is Maddalena who has tricked Gianfigliazzo to steal his armor, horse and weapons, and use these to take on her own direct vengeance on Beelphegor for the previous night. Her hate is however intermixed by now with love and admiration for his bravery and skills; they are both impressed with each other's ability to stand for themselves. The fight turns into love-making and true affection: Maddalena no longer refuses Beelphegor, and the archdevil appears to have acquired new sentiments, at odds with his nature of evil entity. He is so much smiten with the woman that he refuses to follow Adramelech back to hell. The time assigned by Ades is finally over.

Soon Gianfigliazzo and his men manage again to track down the two lovers, and to re-capture Beelphegor who thinks this to be yet another instance of Maddalena's faking love and betrayal. Back in the hands of his captors, the archdevil is at first sarcastic as usual, and he faces his upcoming capital punishment of being burned on the stake without any worries. He is convinced that he will suffer no harm, and that the fire is just a convenient way for a demon to go back to hell.

The supplice begins back in Florence, in front of Lorenzo, Maddalena and the rest of the court and the whole population. Suddenly Adrammelech returns, visible to Beelphegor's alone. He conveys the message that Ades too is furious with the archdevil for the delay in returning to hell, and having shown true love sentiments toward a woman. The punishment is to suddenly lose all his infernal powers, which had protected him so far from feeling pain from the fire: he has been turned into a man from all points of view, just to die horribly.

As he starts to scream for help, Adrammelech cannot intervene but Maddalena decides to save him, even if this means joining her lover on the fire in order to force Lorenzo to halt the execution. Lorenzo understands quickly that it is better to forgive and gain a son-in-law, than to kill him together with his own daughter. Gianfigliazzo however purposefully delays the grace order, unable to forgive his rival even for Maddalena's sake. Lorenzo intervenes and the two lovers are freed. Gianfigliazzo attacks again Beelphegor, but the invisible Adrammelech also returns a final time to help his ex-master. The angry Gianfigliazzo is pushed into the fire and finally dies; Beelphegor gratefully acknowledges the intervention of his past servant and friend, he delivers his farewell and leave the scene in loving embrace with Maddelena, fully embarking into life as a normal man with no special powers but at peace with the limitations and joys of mortality.

== Cast ==
- Vittorio Gassman as Belfagor
- Claudine Auger as Maddalena de' Medici
- Mickey Rooney as Adramelek
- Gabriele Ferzetti as Lorenzo de' Medici
- Ettore Manni as Gianfigliazzo
- Annabella Incontrera as Lucrezia
- Hélène Chanel as Clarice Orsini
- Milena Vukotic as Maddalena's waitress
- Elena Fabrizi as Maddalena's waitress
- Paolo Di Credico as Cardinal Giovanni de' Medici
- Giorgia Moll as aristocrat's wife
- Liana Orfei as Olimpia
- Ugo Fangareggi as Lorenzo's biographer
- Luigi Vannucchi as Prince Franceschetto Cybo
