= Armando Trovajoli =

Italian composer (1917–2013)

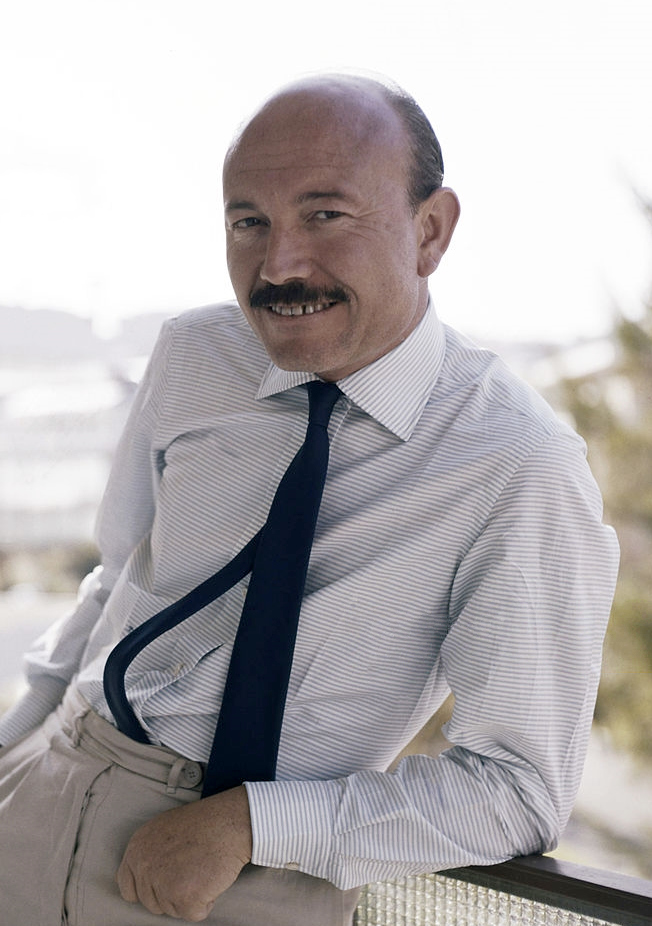
- Trovajoli in 1960
- Born: 2 September 1917; Rome, Kingdom of Italy
- Died: 28 February 2013 (aged 95); Rome, Italy
- Education: Accademia Nazionale di Santa Cecilia
- Occupations: Film composer, pianist
- Years active: 1948–2000s
- Spouse: Pier Angeli (m. 1962; div. 1969)

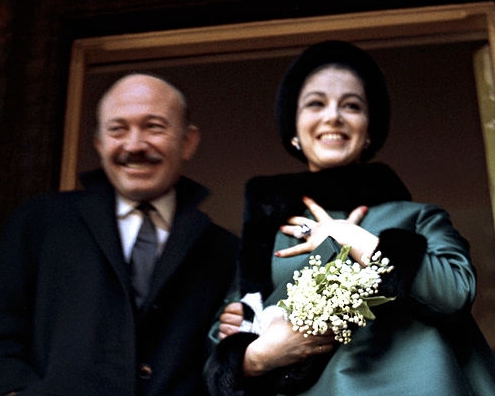
Trovajoli and Pier Angeli on their wedding day, London, 14 February 1962

Armando Trovajoli (also Trovaioli; 2 September 1917 – 28 February 2013) was an Italian film composer and pianist with over 300 credits as composer and/or conductor, many of them jazz scores for exploitation films of the Commedia all'italiana genre. He collaborated with Vittorio De Sica on a number of projects, including one segment of Boccaccio '70. Trovajoli was also the author of several Italian musicals: among them, Rugantino and Aggiungi un posto a tavola.

Trovajoli was the second husband of actress Pier Angeli. He died in Rome at the age of 95 on 28 February 2013.

== Radio ==
After graduating from the Accademia Nazionale di Santa Cecilia in Rome (1948), Trovajoli was entrusted by RAI with the direction of a pop music orchestra, set with 12 violins, 4 violas, 4 cellos, 1 flute, 1 oboe, 1 clarinet, 1 horn, harp, vibraphone, electric guitar, bass, drums and the piano (played by Trovajoli himself). In 1952–53 he collaborated with Piero Piccioni in Eclipse, a weekly musical broadcast in which the orchestra is directed alternately by the two composers, in a style extremely refined and sophisticated, very different from the music of radio orchestras at that time.

== Movie scores ==
Together with Goffredo Petrassi, Trovajoli composed the score of Giuseppe De Santis' Bitter Rice (1949). In 1951, Trovajoli was invited by Dino De Laurentiis to write music for Anna, a film directed by Alberto Lattuada, particularly the song El Negro Zumbón, which became an international success. Inspired by tropical rhythms, in the film it was lip synced and danced by Silvana Mangano, with the actual vocal performance by Flo Sandon's.

After that, Trovajoli wrote soundtracks for directors such as Dino Risi, Vittorio De Sica, Ettore Scola. He composed a total of over 300 scores, with his most popular song being "L'amore Dice Ciao" from the 1968 film The Libertine.

== Selected filmography ==
- Brothers of Italy (1952)
- Two Nights with Cleopatra (1954)
- A Day in Court (1954)
- Poor Millionaires (1959)
- Il vedovo (1959)
- Uncle Was a Vampire (1959)
- Winter Holidays (1959)
- The Hundred Kilometers (1959)
- A Qualcuna Piace Calvo (1959)
- Call Girls of Rome (1960)
- Two Women (1960)
- Atom Age Vampire (1960)
- Hercules and the Conquest of Atlantis (1961)
- Mole Men Against the Son of Hercules (1961)
- The Giant of Metropolis (1961)
- Hercules in the Haunted World (1961)
- The Orderly (1961)
- His Women (1961)
- Werewolf in a Girls' Dormitory (1961)
- La ragazza di mille mesi (1961)
- Le magnifiche 7 (1961)
- Planets Against Us (1962)
- Boccaccio '70 (1962)
- Toto's First Night (1962)
- Sexy Toto (1963)
- I mostri (1963)
- Yesterday, Today and Tomorrow (1963)
- Marriage Italian Style (1964)
- Let's Talk About Women (1964)
- What Ever Happened to Baby Toto? (1964)
- Italian Engagement (1964)
- Beautiful Families (1964)
- Attack and Retreat (1964)
- Assassination in Rome (1965)
- The Myth (1965)
- Casanova '70 (1965)
- Seven Golden Men (1965)
- Le bambole (1965)
- I Complessi (1965)
- Seven Golden Men Strike Again (1966)
- God's Own Country (1966 film)
- Sex Quartet (1966)
- Maigret a Pigalle (1966)
- Adultery Italian Style (1966)
- Treasure of San Gennaro (1966)
- The Devil in Love (1966)
- Our Husbands (1966)
- Long Days of Vengeance (1967)
- Don Giovanni in Sicilia (1967)
- Col cuore in gola (1967)
- Drop Dead, My Love (1968)
- The Fuller Report (1968)
- Mr. Kinky (1968)
- Torture Me But Kill Me with Kisses (1968)
- Faustina (1968)
- Will Our Heroes Be Able to Find Their Friend Who Has Mysteriously Disappeared in Africa? (1968)
- The Libertine (1968)
- Seven Times Seven (1969)
- I See Naked (1969)
- How, When and with Whom (1969)
- Police Chief Pepe (1969)
- Where Are You Going All Naked? (1969)
- Nell'anno del Signore (1969)
- Il giovane normale (1969)
- The Pizza Triangle (1970)
- May Morning (1970)
- The Priest's Wife (1970)
- Stanza 17-17 palazzo delle tasse, ufficio imposte (1971)
- The Blonde in the Blue Movie (1971)
- The Double (1971)
- Homo Eroticus (1971)
- That's How We Women Are (1971)
- Manhunt (1972)
- L'uccello migratore (1972)
- La Tosca (1973)
- Amore e ginnastica (1973)
- The Sensual Man (1973)
- Rugantino (1973)
- How Funny Can Sex Be? (1973)
- There is More Than One Mother (1974)
- Tell me you do everything for me (1974)
- La via dei babbuini (1974)
- Bitter Love (1974)
- Scent of a Woman (1974)
- We All Loved Each Other So Much (1974)
- La moglie vergine (1975)
- Duck in Orange Sauce (1975)
- Strange Shadows in an Empty Room (1976)
- Tell Me You Do Everything for Me (1976)
- The Career of a Chambermaid (1976)
- Down and Dirty (1976)
- Evil Thoughts (1976)
- Luna di miele in tre (1976)
- Basta che non si sappia in giro (1976)
- A Special Day (1977)
- Il marito in collegio (1977)
- I nuovi mostri (1977)
- In the Name of the Pope King (1977)
- La stanza del vescovo (1977)
- The Fifth Commandment (1978)
- Amori miei (1978)
- Dr. Jekyll Likes Them Hot (1979)
- Life Is Beautiful (1979)
- La terrazza (1980)
- Passion of Love (1981)
- Shut Up When You Speak! (1981)
- Count Tacchia (1982)
- Grand Hotel Excelsior (1982)
- Il paramedico (1982)
- That Night in Varennes (1982)
- Dagger Eyes (1983)
- Sing Sing (1983)
- Frankenstein 90 (1984)
- Macaroni (1985)
- La Famiglia (1987)
- Miss Arizona (1988)
- Brothers (1988)
- Days of Inspector Ambrosio (1988)
- Mano rubata (1989)
- What Time Is It? (1989)
- Captain Fracassa's Journey (1990)
- The Wicked (1991)
- Gangsters (1992)
- Giovani e belli (1996)
- The Dinner (1998)
- Unfair Competition (2001)
