= Luigi Magni =

Italian screenwriter and film director

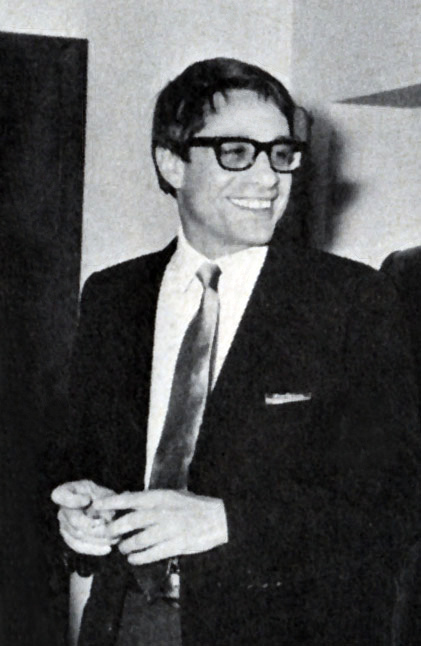
- Born: 21 March 1928; Rome, Kingdom of Italy
- Died: 27 October 2013 (aged 85); Rome, Italy

Luigi Magni (21 March 1928 – 27 October 2013) was an Italian screenwriter and film director.

== Life and career ==
Born in Rome, Italy, Magni started his career as a screenwriter, in 1956, with Time of Vacation. In 1968 he collaborated with Mario Monicelli in creating a real "event" of the Italian cinema by transforming Monica Vitti into a comedic actress with The Girl with the Pistol, and the critical and commercial success of the film pushed him into directing. After the directorial debut with Faustina (which was also the debut film of Vonetta McGee), in 1969 Magni achieved an extraordinary success with The Conspirators, which was the highest-grossing Italian film of the year, so as to require for the first time in Italy nighttime screenings to meet the demands of the audience. The film marked the encounter with Nino Manfredi, with whom Magni had a long-standing association on the set (including the screenplay of Manfredi's award-winning film Per Grazia Ricevuta) and a close friendship off the set. The film also defined Magni's style, namely a commedia all'italiana mainly centred on Rome and its history, particularly the epoch between the Papal States and the Risorgimento.

In 1977 Magni achieved critical recognition with In the Name of the Pope King, which also gave him his first David di Donatello Award. He received a second David di Donatello in 1995, for the screenplay of Nemici d'infanzia, and a special David di Donatello Lifetime Career Award in 2008.

In 1991 he was a member of the jury at the 17th Moscow International Film Festival. After the 2003 TV movie La notte di Pasquino, a sort of sequel of Nell'anno del Signore still with Nino Manfredi as the main actor, and with the death of Manfredi in 2004, Magni retired from cinema. He died in Rome, on 27 October 2013.

== Filmography ==
=== Screenwriter ===
- La cambiale (1959)
- Il corazziere (1960)
- The Orderly (1961)
- Il mio amico Benito (1962)
- In Italia si chiama amore (1963)
- A Sentimental Attempt (1964)
- White Voices (1964)
- Extraconiugale (1964)
- La Celestina P... R... (1964)
- Le bambole (1965)
- The Mandrake (1965)
- Madamigella di Maupin (1965)
- Sex Quartet (1966)
- Non faccio la guerra, faccio l'amore (1966)
- El Greco (1966)
- On My Way to the Crusades, I Met a Girl Who... (1967)
- The Witches (1967)
- Il marito è mio e l'ammazzo quando mi pare (1967)
- The Girl with the Pistol (1968)
- Faustina (1968)
- The Conspirators (1969)
- Scipio the African (1971)
- Between Miracles (1973)
- La Tosca (1973)
- La via dei babbuini (1974)
- Basta che non si sappia in giro (1976)
- In the Name of the Pope King (1977)
- Arrivano i bersaglieri (1980)
- State buoni se potete (1983)
- Secondo Ponzio Pilato (1987)
- 'O Re (1989)
- In the Name of the Sovereign People (1990)
- Nemici d'infanzia (1995)
- La Carbonara (2000)

=== Director ===
- Faustina (1968)
- The Conspirators (1969)
- Scipio the African (1971)
- La Tosca (1973)
- La via dei babbuini (1974)
- Basta che non si sappia in giro (1976)
- Strange Occasion (1976)
- In the Name of the Pope King (1977)
- Goodnight, Ladies and Gentlemen (1977)
- Arrivano i bersaglieri (1980)
- State buoni se potete (1983)
- L'addio a Enrico Berlinguer (1984)
- Secondo Ponzio Pilato (1987)
- Imago Urbis (1987)
- 'O Re (1989)
- In the Name of the Sovereign People (1990)
- Nemici d'infanzia (1995)
- Esercizi di stile (1996)
- La Carbonara (2000)

== Honours ==
- June 2005: Galileo Galilei Award, received at Palazzo Giustiniani in the presence of Gustavo Raffi, venerable master of the Grand Orient of Italy
