= Ettore Scola =

Italian screenwriter and film director (1931–2016)

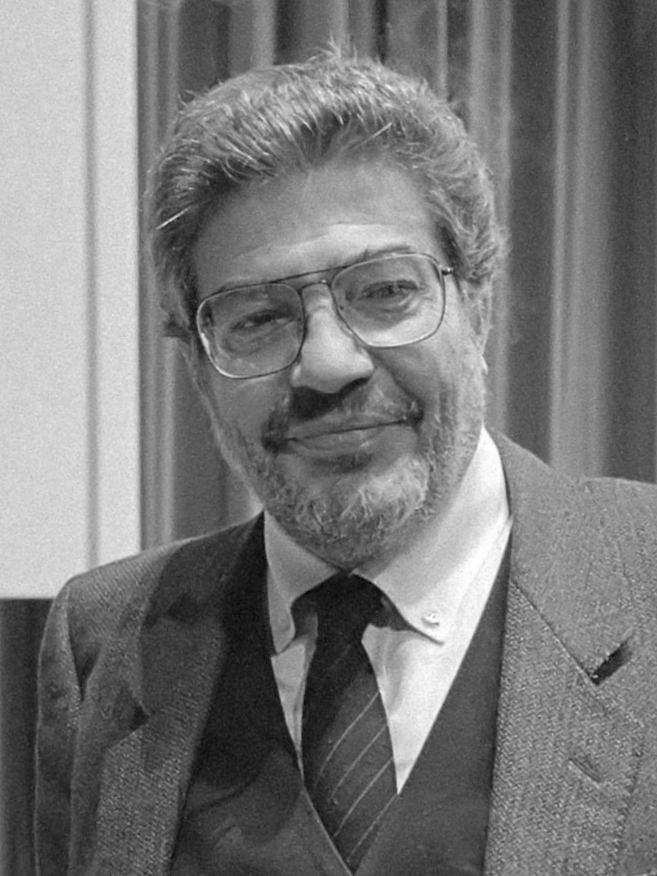
- Scola in 1983
- Born: 10 May 1931; Trevico, Kingdom of Italy
- Died: 19 January 2016 (aged 84); Rome, Italy
- Occupations: Film director; screenwriter
- Years active: 1964–2016
- Height: 1.78 m (5 ft 10 in)
- Children: 2

Ettore Scola (Italian: [ˈɛttore ˈskɔːla]; 10 May 1931 – 19 January 2016) was an Italian screenwriter and film director. He received a Golden Globe for Best Foreign Film in 1978 for his film A Special Day and over the course of his film career was nominated for five Academy Awards for Best Foreign Language Film.

== Life and career ==
Scola was born in Trevico, Avellino, Campania. At age 15, he became a ghostwriter. He entered the film industry as a screenwriter in 1953 and collaborated with director Dino Risi and fellow writer Ruggero Maccari on the screenplay for Risi's feature, Il Sorpasso (1962). He directed his first film, Let's Talk About Women, in 1964. In 1974, Scola enjoyed international success with We All Loved Each Other So Much (C'eravamo tanto amati), a wide fresco of post-World War II Italian life and politics, dedicated to fellow director Vittorio De Sica. The film won the Golden Prize at the 9th Moscow International Film Festival. In 1976, he won the Prix de la mise en scène at the 1976 Cannes Film Festival for Down and Dirty.

Scola made further successful films, including A Special Day (1977), That Night In Varennes (1982), What Time Is It? (1989) and Captain Fracassa's Journey (1990). He directed close to 40 films in some 40 years. His film Passione d'amore, adapted from a 19th-century novel, was adapted by Stephen Sondheim and James Lapine into the award-winning musical Passion. He was a member of the jury at the 1988 Cannes Film Festival.

A lifelong supporter of left-wing politics, Scola was part of the shadow cabinet of the Italian Communist Party in 1989 as Minister of Culture.

In 2009, Scola signed a petition in support of film director Roman Polanski, calling for his release after Polanski was arrested in Switzerland in relation to his 1977 charge for drugging and raping a 13-year-old girl.

Scola died in Rome on 19 January 2016 at the age of 84.

== Filmography as director ==
- Let's Talk About Women (1964)
- Thrilling (1965)
- Hard Time for Princes (1965)
- The Devil in Love (1966)
- Will Our Heroes Be Able to Find Their Friend Who Has Mysteriously Disappeared in Africa? (1968)
- Police Chief Pepe (1969)
- The Pizza Triangle (1970)
- My Name Is Rocco Papaleo (1971)
- The Most Wonderful Evening of My Life (1972)
- Trevico-Turin: Voyage in Fiatnam (1973)
- Festival Unità (1973) – documentary
- We All Loved Each Other So Much (1974)
- Goodnight, Ladies and Gentlemen (1976)
- Down and Dirty (1976)
- A Special Day (1977)
- La terrazza (1980)
- Passion of Love (1981)
- That Night in Varennes (1982)
- Vorrei che volo (1982) – documentary
- Le Bal (1983)
- Macaroni (1985)
- Imago urbis (1987) – documentary
- The Family (1987)
- Splendor (1988)
- What Time Is It? (1989)
- Captain Fracassa's Journey (1990)
- Mario, Maria and Mario (1993)
- The Story of a Poor Young Man (1995)
- The Dinner (1998)
- Unfair Competition (2001)
- Un altro mondo è possibile (2001) – documentary
- Lettere dalla Palestina (2002) – documentary
- Gente di Roma (2003)
- How Strange to Be Named Federico (2013) – documentary

== Awards ==
- 1966: Nastro d'Argento Best script Io la conoscevo bene
- 1975: Moscow Film Festival Best film C'eravamo tanto amati
- 1976: Cannes Film Festival Best Director for Down and Dirty
- 1977: César Award for Best Foreign Film for C'eravamo tanto amati
- 1978: Golden Globe for Best Foreign Film for A Special Day
- 1977: Academy Award nominee for A Special Day
- 1978: Academy Award nominee for Viva Italia!
- 1978: César Award for Best Foreign Film for A Special Day
- 1978: Nastro d'Argento Best script for A Special Day
- 1978: David di Donatello Best Director for A Special Day
- 1980: Cannes Film Festival Best script for La terrazza
- 1980: Nastro d'Argento Best script for La terrazza
- 1981: Nastro d'Argento Best script Passion d'amour
- 1983: David di Donatello Best script for La Nuit de Varennes
- 1983: Academy Award nominee for Le Bal
- 1984: César Award for Best Director for Le Bal
- 1984: Berlin Film Festival:
  - Silver Bear for Best Director for Le Bal
  - Jury of readers Berliner Morgenpost for Le Bal
- 1984: David di Donatello:
  - Best Director Le Bal
  - Prix Alitalia for Le Bal
- 1986: Golden Medal of the City of Rome for the 30th anniversary of David di Donatello
- 1987: Academy Award nominee for La famiglia
- 1987: David di Donatello:
  - Best Director La famiglia
  - Best Script La famiglia
- 1987: Nastro d'Argento:
  - Best Director La famiglia
  - Best Script La famiglia
- 1990: Berlin Film Festival:
  - Golden Bear (nominated)
- 1990: Pietro Bianchi award at Venice Film Festival
- 1995: Award for his career at Flaiano Film Festival
- 1997: a Golden Palm Star on the Palm Springs, California, Walk of Stars, was dedicated to him.
- 2001: 23rd Moscow International Film Festival Best Director for Concorrenza sleale
- 2001: Taormina Arte Award at Taormina Film Fest
