= Ruggero Mastroianni =

Italian film editor (1929–1996)

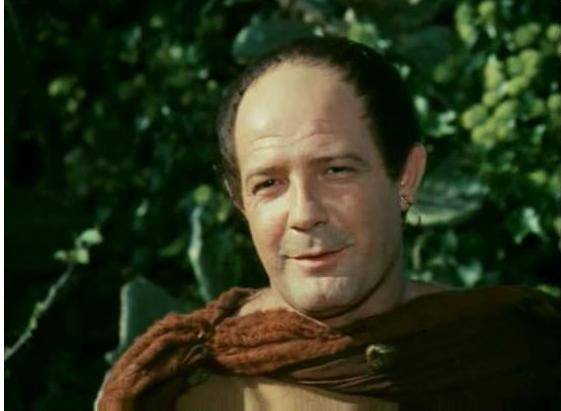
- Mastroianni in Scipione detto anche l'Africano (1971)
- Born: 7 November 1929; Turin, Piedmont, Kingdom of Italy
- Died: 9 September 1996 (aged 66); Torvaianica, Lazio, Italy
- Occupation: Film editor
- Years active: 1957–1996
- Relatives: Marcello Mastroianni (brother); Chiara Mastroianni (niece)

Ruggero Mastroianni (7 November 1929 – 9 September 1996) was an Italian film editor. In his obituary of Mastroianni, critic Tony Sloman described him as "arguably, the finest Italian film editor of his generation."

Born in Turin, he was the brother of the actor Marcello Mastroianni and nephew of the sculptor Umberto Mastroianni. He had a significant collaboration with director Federico Fellini, whose films he edited for over twenty years; their work includes Giulietta degli spiriti (1965), Amarcord (1973), and Ginger and Fred (1986), the last of which features his brother. He had a similarly notable collaboration with director Luchino Visconti in films like Le Notti Bianche (1957), Morte a Venezia (1971), Ludwig (1972) and Gruppo di Famiglia in un Interno (1974). He also edited the 1974 absurdist western comedy Don't Touch The White Woman!. He won 5 David di Donatello Awards and 1 Nastro d'Argento as Best Editor.

With his brother, who acted the part of Scipione l'Africano, he played the role of Scipio Asiaticus in the film Scipio the African by Luigi Magni.

Ruggero Mastroianni died in Torvaianica, near Rome, in 1996. His brother died three months later.

== See also ==
- List of film director and editor collaborations
