= Ruggero Maccari =

Italian screenwriter (1919–1989)

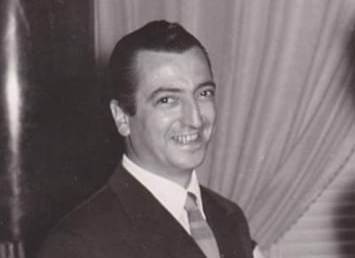
- Born: 28 June 1919; Rome, Kingdom of Italy
- Died: 8 May 1989 (aged 69); Rome, Italy

Ruggero Maccari (28 June 1919 – 8 May 1989) was an Italian screenwriter.

Specially known by his collaboration with film director and screenwriter Ettore Scola. He wrote Commedia all'italiana films such as The Easy Life, Down and Dirty, or Adua and Her Friends.

== Awards ==
He was nominated for the Academy Award for Dino Risi's Scent of a Woman.

He won a David di Donatello for Ettore Scola's La famiglia; and he was a 4-time Nastro d'Argento winner for La famiglia, Scola's Passione d'amore and A Special Day, and Antonio Pietrangeli's I Knew Her Well.

== Selected filmography ==
- Eleven Men and a Ball (1948)
- The Transporter (1950)
- Rome-Paris-Rome (1951)
- The Steamship Owner (1951)
- The Passaguai Family (1951)
- I, Hamlet (1952)
- The Dream of Zorro (1952)
- Sardinian Vendetta (1952)
- The Passaguai Family Gets Rich (1952)
- The Piano Tuner Has Arrived (1952)
- Beauties in Capri (1952)
- The Doctor of the Mad (1954)
- Toto Seeks Peace (1954)
- It Happened at the Police Station (1954)
- Tripoli, Beautiful Land of Love (1954)
- The Two Friends (1955)
- Red and Black (1955)
- Count Max (1957)
