= Ciceruacchio =

Roman popular leader (1800–1849)

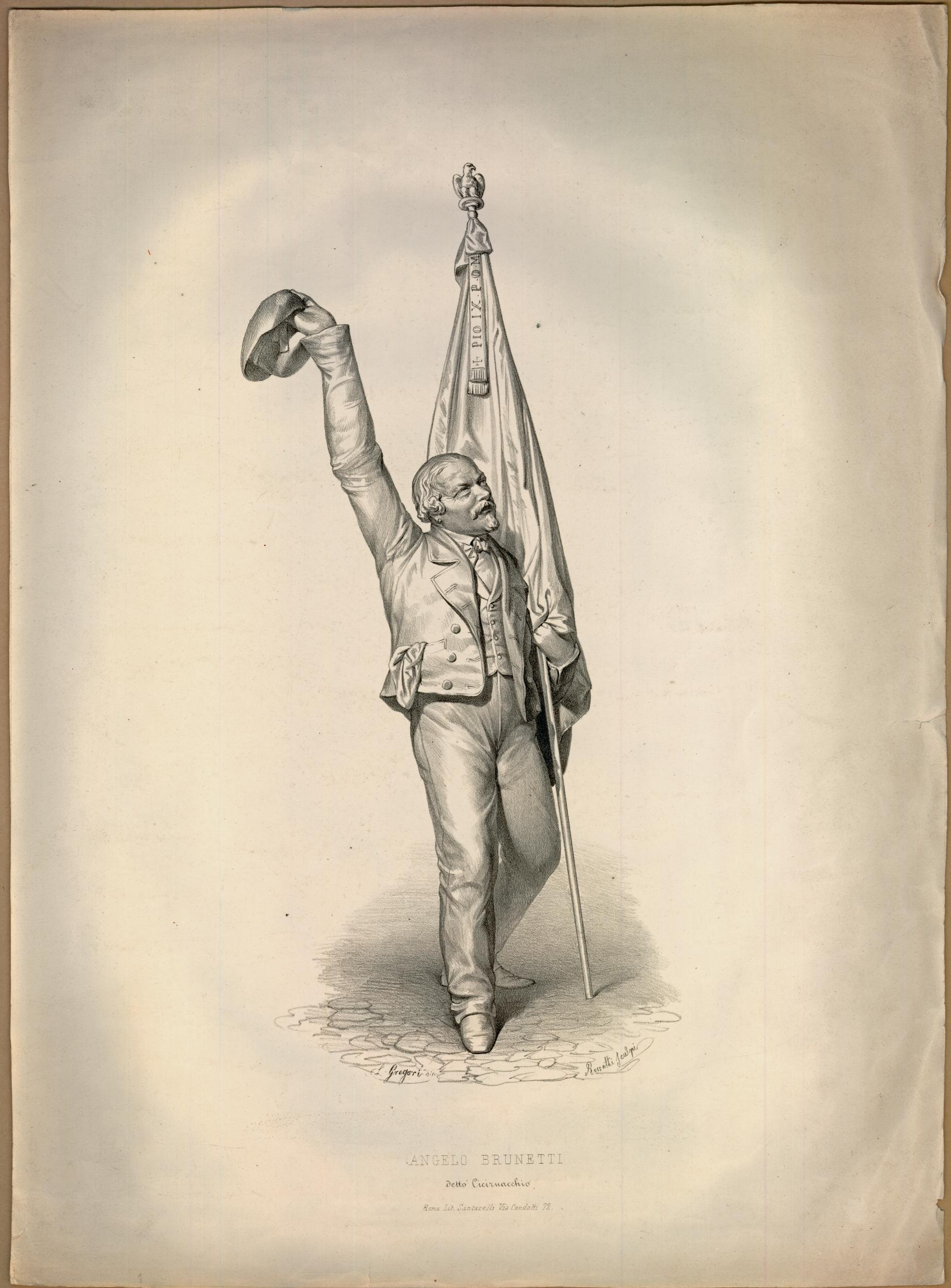
- Drawing of Ciceruacchio after Antonio Rossetti
- Born: Angelo Brunetti; 27 September 1800; Campo Marzio, Rome, Papal States
- Died: 10 August 1849 (aged 48); Ca' Tiepolo, Kingdom of Lombardy–Venetia, Austrian Empire
- Movement: Carbonari; Young Italy
- Spouse: Annetta Cimarra (m. 1820)
- Children: Luigi; Lorenzo

Angelo Brunetti (27 September 1800 – 10 August 1849), better known as Ciceruacchio, was a Roman popular leader who participated in the Roman Republic of 1849. Born in the Campo Marzio district of Rome, he owned a small carting business and became involved with the movement for the political unification of Italy. Having risen to a prominent position in Roman politics after the accession of Pope Pius IX, he supported the overthrow of the pope's government and the proclamation of the Republic. After the Republic's defeat by the French, Brunetti was captured and executed by the army of the Austrian Empire.

== Name ==
Brunetti was known by the nickname Ciceruacchio. Writing in the Dizionario Biografico degli Italiani, the historian Maria Luisa Trebiliani gives two possible explanations for the name: 1) the Roman statesman and orator Cicero, to whose eloquence Brunetti was compared, or 2) a puerile term of endearment derived from the Italian ciccio ('chubby') and the Romanesco rocchio ('piece').

== Background ==
Angelo Brunetti was born on 27 September 1800 into a working-class family in the Campo Marzio district of Rome. His parents were Lorenzo Brunetti, a farrier, and Cecilia Fiorini. After receiving a simple education, Brunetti started working as a cart driver, transporting wine from the Roman Castles to the city. In 1820, he married Annetta Cimarra, a woman from his home district; they had two sons, Luigi and Lorenzo. In the following two decades, he greatly expanded the size of his transport business, and began delivering hay and cereals to customers including the Ospedale di Santo Spirito in Sassia. His business afforded the family a moderate level of comfort.

== Involvement in politics ==
Having acquired considerable local influence through his business activities, Brunetti seems to have been introduced to politics by the writer Pietro Sterbini and the notary Felice Scifoni, who in 1827 led him to join the Carbonari, a revolutionary group advocating for the political unification of Italy. In 1835, encouraged by the Italian nationalist Mattia Montecchi, he became a member of Young Italy, a unification movement led by the activist Giuseppe Mazzini. In 1837, he came under police surveillance because of his involvement in politics.

In 1846, the accession of Pope Pius IX raised hopes for liberal reforms within the Papal States. Brunetti organised the Roman public to gather in mass rallies in honour of the new pope. Through his leadership of these events, he became one of the city's most influential politicians, inspiring imitators such as the Neapolitan Michele Viscuso. Visiting Rome during this time, the Piedmontese politician Massimo d'Azeglio described Brunetti thus: "[he] is Rome's first citizen. He exhorts, he pontificates, he keeps the peace."

== Roman Republic ==
In the context of the Revolutions of 1848, the government of Pius IX came under pressure to enact liberal reforms. As the pope resisted the popular demands for change, the leaders of the reform movement began to antagonise him. Initially, Brunetti isolated himself by his continued support of Pius, but gradually came to embrace the increasingly radicalised opposition. In November 1848, Pellegrino Rossi, the head of the pope's government, was assassinated. Brunetti was thought to be personally implicated, while his son Luigi was suspected to have been the assassin. After Rossi's death, Pius IX fled to the Neapolitan town of Gaeta.

In February 1849, while the pope was exiled, the Roman opposition replaced their theocratic government with a democratic one, the Roman Republic. Brunetti occupied a less prominent role during this period. However, he participated in the defence of the city against a French assault under Charles Oudinot. When the city was captured by the French, Brunetti accompanied Giuseppe Garibaldi, the military leader of the Republican forces, on his northward retreat towards Venice.

== Death ==
On 9 August 1849, Brunetti, his sons, and a small group of Republicans were captured by troops of the Austrian Empire before crossing into Venetian territory. Without a trial, they were executed on the next day for their involvement in the Roman Republic by a firing squad in the town of Ca' Tiepolo. Ciceruacchio asked the Austrians to spare his youngest son, aged 13; instead, they shot him first.

== Reception ==
In Luigi Magni's film In the Name of the Sovereign People (1990), Ciceruacchio is played by the Italian actor Nino Manfredi.

== Bibliography ==
- Kertzer, David (2018). The Pope who would be King: the Exile of Pius IX and the Emergence of Modern Europe. Oxford: Oxford University Press. ISBN 9780198827498.
- Trebiliani, Maria Lusia (1972). "Brunetti, Angelo, detto Ciceruacchio". Dizionario Biografico degli Italiani (in Italian).
