= Armellini =

Armellini is a surname of Italian origin. Notable people with the surname include:

- Alejandro Armellini (born 1966), Uruguayan teacher
- Andrea Armellini (born 1970), retired Italian football goalkeeper
- Antonio Armellini (born 1943), retired Italian diplomat
- Augusto Armellini (c. 1827–1912), Italian politician.
- Carlo Armellini (1777–1863), Italian politician, activist and jurist
- Faustina Bracci Armellini (1785–1857), Italian pastellist
- Francesco Armellini Pantalassi de' Medici (1470–1528) – cardinal of the Roman Catholic Church
- Mariano Armellini (1852–1896), Italian archaeologist and historian
- Marco Armellini (born 1960), former Italian professional tennis player
- Quirino Armellini (1889–1975), Italian general
- Romina Armellini (born 1984), Italian swimmer

== See also ==
- 6855 Armellini, asteroid
