= Gaetano Bedini =

Italian ecclesiastic, cardinal, and diplomat

His Eminence Gaetano Bedini
- Bishop of Viterbo-Tuscanella
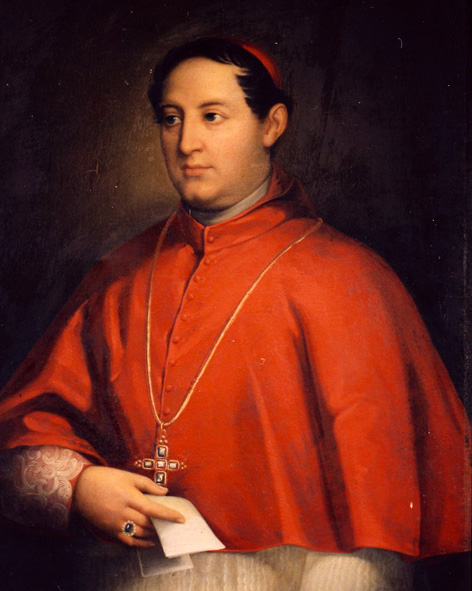
- Image in the Viterbo Cathedral.
- Church: Roman Catholic Church
- Diocese: Viterbo-Tuscanella
- See: Viterbo-Tuscanella
- Appointed: 18 March 1861
- Installed: 8 May 1861
- Term ended: 6 September 1864
- Predecessor: Gaspare Bernardo Pianetti
- Successor: Matteo Eustachio Gonella
- Other post: Cardinal-Priest of Santa Maria sopra Minerva (1861–64)
- Previous posts: Apostolic Internuncio to Brazil (1845-47); Titular Archbishop of Thebae (1852-61); Secretary of the Congregation for the Propagation of the Faith (1856-61)

Orders
- Ordination: 20 December 1828 by Fabrizio Sceberras Testaferrata
- Consecration: 4 July 1852 by Lodovico Altieri
- Created cardinal: 27 September 1861 by Pope Pius IX
- Rank: Cardinal-Priest

Personal details
- Born: Gaetano Bedini; 15 May 1806 Senigallia, Papal States
- Died: 6 September 1864 (aged 58) Viterbo, Papal States
- Buried: Viterbo Cathedral
- Parents: Pellegrino Bedini; Marianna Spadoni
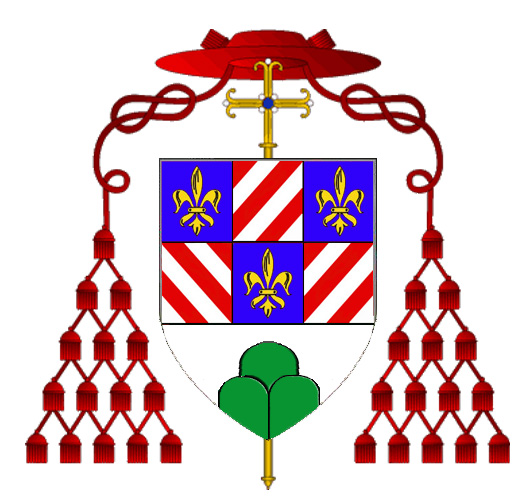
- Coat of arms

Gaetano Bedini (15 May 1806 – 6 September 1864) was an Italian ecclesiastic, cardinal, and diplomat of the Catholic Church.

== Biography ==
Bedini was born in Senigallia into the Bedini family of Ostra, the son of Alessandro Pellegrino and Marianna Spadoni.

The youngest of 7 sons, Bedini was intended by his father to be a priest. He entered the seminary at Senigallia and was ordained a Roman Catholic priest on 20 December 1828 by Cardinal Fabrizio Sceberras Testaferrata. In the following years he became canon of the cathedral of Senigallia (1829–1838).

Thanks to influential friends, including Giovanni Mastai Ferretti (the future Pope Pius IX, also native of Senigallia), he dedicated himself to politics. He was secretary of Lodovico Altieri, archbishop of Ephesus and nuncio in Austria from 1838 to 1845. When Lodovico Altieri was named cardinal, Bedini gained exposure to the diplomatic atmosphere, and he was subsequently called to Rome as Papal Chamberlain of Gregorius XVI and the Protonotary apostolic.

=== Apostolic nunziatura in Brazil ===
The first important assignment received by Bedini was that of Internuncio in Brazil, from 28 October 1845 to 16 August 1847. He worked for the improvement of the living conditions of German immigrants and supported Catholicism against the Protestant proselytism. His work led the Chamber of Deputies of Rio de Janeiro to improve the living conditions of the German immigrants.

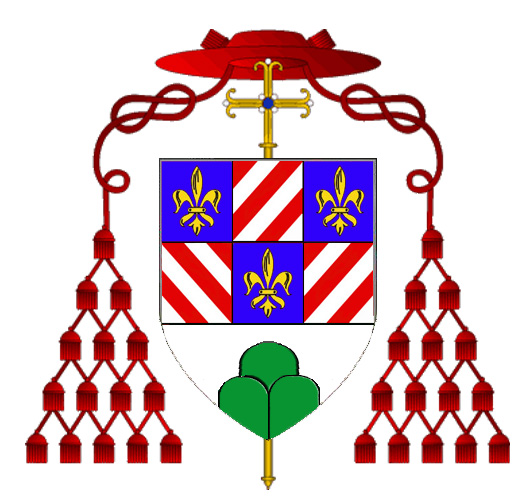
Heraldry of Cardinal Bedini.

=== Contacts with Garibaldi ===
Giuseppe Garibaldi, who was also living in South America at the time, wrote a famous letter to Bedini in 1847 in which he declared "to offer to Pius IX its sword and the Italian legion for the native land and the church", remembered "the garnishments of our August religion, always new and always immortal" and reminded that "the throne of Peter rests over such foundations that need no aid because the human forces cannot shake them". Bedini replied thanking him, but the offer to Rome of the Roman legion was never received.

=== Roman Republic and legation in Bologna ===
Returning to Rome in March 1848, Bedini replaced the Cardinal Secretary of State Giacomo Antonelli, from 10 March 1848 until November 1848 following Pius IX when he was forced into exile in Gaeta, by the Roman Republic (1849) revolution in Rome.

Once the Pope had recovered his temporal power, Bedini continued his job of Papal Nuncio and commissioner in the Legations to Bologna from 1849 to 1852. Just at the beginning of that period, Ugo Bassi was captured at Comacchio and executed on 8 August 1849 in Bologna by the Austrians. Many patriots accused Bedini of non-intervention in order to save himself.

In his position at Bologna, however, he restored the Palazzo d'Accursio with the restyling of Sala Urbana and the construction of the Aula Piana, he adopted provisions for the unemployed, favoured commerce with the construction of new roads, promoted agriculture, and restored important artistic monuments like the Villa San Michele in Foresta.

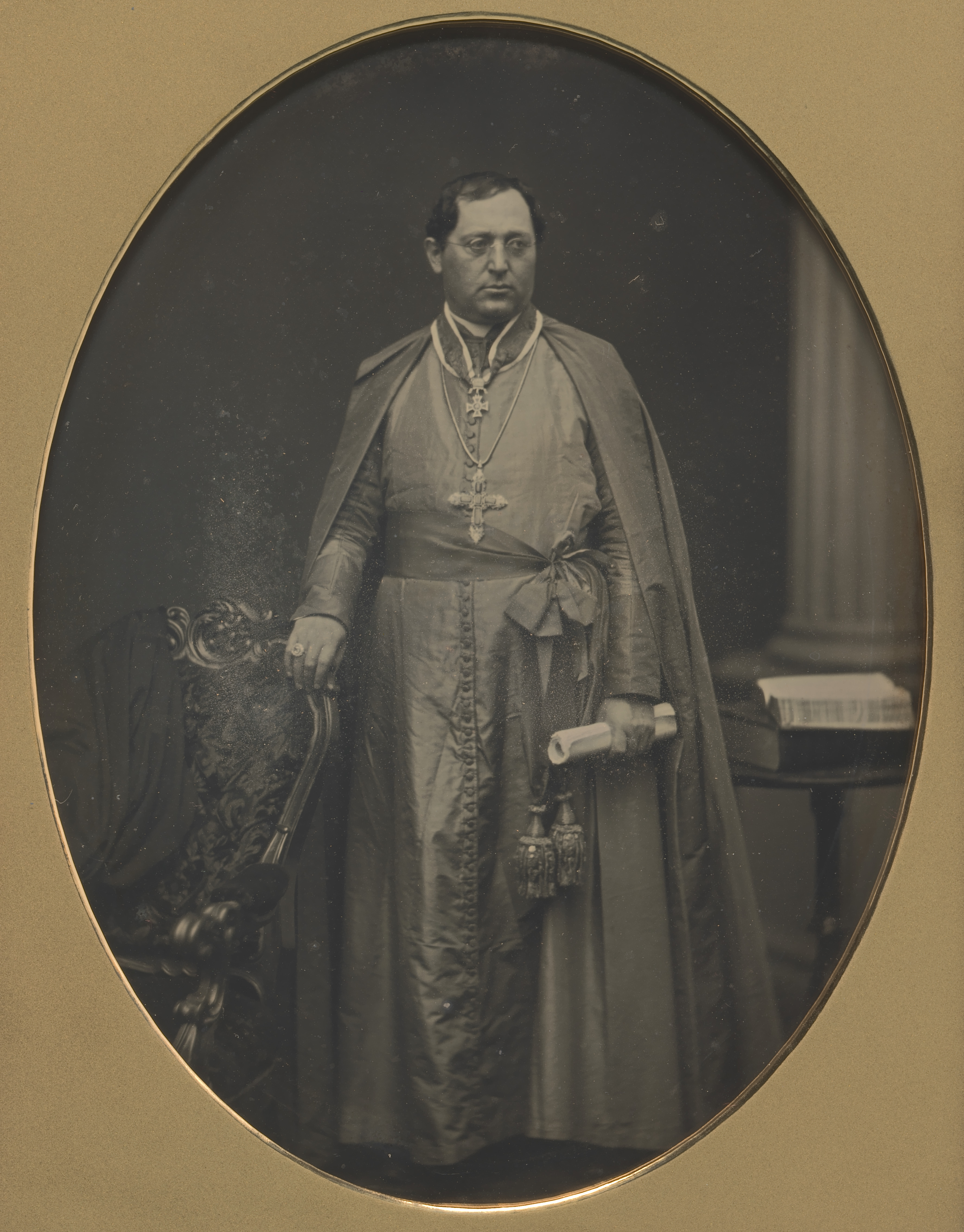
Daguerreotype of Cardinal Bedini in the U.S. in 1853 (National Portrait Gallery, Smithsonian Institution, USA).

=== Apostolic nunciature in United States ===
On 15 March 1852 he was named titular Archbishop of Thebes, and, three days after, Apostolic Nuncio in Brazil. Once he received the archiepiscopal order on 4 July 1852 from cardinal Luigi Lambruschini, he decided to leave for Brazil, but since he could not enter the country because of a plague epidemic, he went to the United States. He was the first Papal Nuncio in the United States.

He arrived in New York City on 30 June 1853. He became the target of attacks by non-Catholics because of his role in overthrowing the Anti-Papal Roman Republic in 1849, and his visit triggered the Cincinnati Riot of 1853 in which several hundred men marched in protest against his visit.

While travelling, Bedini met the president of the United States, Franklin Pierce, to whom he delivered a letter from the Pope, and the American Secretary of State, William L. Marcy. He ordained some new bishops, amongst whom were James Roosevelt Bayley, Bishop of the Diocese of Newark; John Loughlin, bishop of the Diocese of Brooklyn; and Louis De Goesbriand, bishop of the Diocese of Burlington. After visiting New York, Pittsburgh, Louisville, Baltimore, and Philadelphia, he returned to Rome from New Orleans in January 1854.

=== Position in Curia ===
After returning to Italy he worked more intensely in the Roman Curia. On 20 June 1856 he was named General Secretary of the Sacred Congregation for the Propaganda of the Faith. He also initiated some plans such as the constitution of the North American College to Rome that with his aid had bought a building on Humility Street on 22 September 1858. After having resolved all the bureaucratic problems this institute was inaugurated on 8 December 1859.

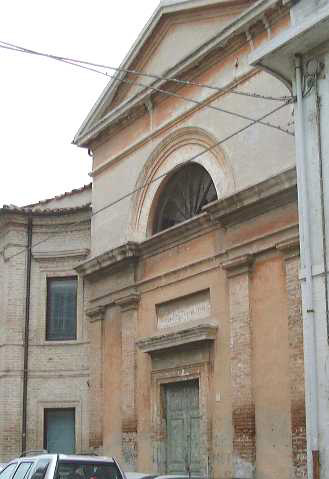
Bedini Church at Senigallia.

=== Cardinal of Viterbo ===
In March 1861, Bedini was named Bishop of Viterbo and Tuscanella (today's Tuscania). He entered the city on 8 May 1861 from the Porta Romana. He opened the pastoral visit by going to several of the counties of the diocese and taking care of the sacred places, the monasteries, and especially of the seminary, in which he improved the instruction (calling Pietro Artemi from Bagnoregio for the rhetorical school), arranged the cleaning of the premises and enlarged the building with the purchase of the Cristofari palace.

On 27 September 1861 he was made Cardinal of the Order of the Priests with Santa Maria sopra Minerva as his church.

=== Death ===
Cardinal Bedini died on the morning of 6 September 1864 at 59 years old, probably of an apoplectic stroke. The people of the city of Viterbo grieved immensely at the unexpected news. The theatre was closed in sign of mourning. He was buried in the Cathedral of the city near his predecessor as bishop, Saint Matteo Gonella.

In Luigi Magni's film In the Name of the Sovereign People (1990), Bedini is played by Luigi De Filippo.

== See also ==
- Senigallia
- Giuseppe Garibaldi
- Bologna
- Santa Maria sopra Minerva
- Viterbo

Catholic Church titles
Preceded by Tommaso Pasquale Gizzi	Archbishop of Thebes; 1852–1861	Succeeded by Mieczysław Halka Ledóchowski
Preceded by Matteo Eustachio Gonella	Archbishop of Viterbo; 1861–1864	Succeeded by Gaspare Bernardo Pianetti
Preceded by Matteo Eustachio Gonella	Cardinal Priest of Santa Maria sopra Minerva; 1861–1864	Succeeded by Francesco Gaude
