= Aurelio Saliceti =

Italian politician and lawyer

Aurelio Saliceti (Ripattoni, 1804 – Turin, 1862) was an Italian politician, lawyer and patriot, affiliate of the Risorgimento.

He was among the first affiliates to Young Italy. In 1848 he was appointed by the Constitutional Government as Minister for Justice, a position from which he resigned a few days later, having failed to pass his reform plans. He went to Rome to fight in favor of the Roman Republic and was later sent in exile to London. There he lived as a poor man, but remained a committed patriot, now adhering to the Italian National Committee of Giuseppe Mazzini.

He moved to Paris in 1851, where he withdrew from Mazzini to join a project intended to oust the Bourbons from Naples, and replace it with a descendant of Joachim Murat. He returned to Naples in 1860 and there held the chair of the Supreme Court and obtained a university chair. He died in 1862.
