= Livraghi =

Livraghi is a surname of Italian origin. Notable people with the surname include:

- Giancarlo Livraghi, Italian writer
- Giovanni Livraghi, Italian soldier
- Roberto Livraghi, Italian composer
- Virginio Livraghi, Italian comic strip artist and illustrator
