= Sidoli =

Sidoli is a surname originating in Italy and prevalent among Welsh Italians. Notable people with this surname include the following:

- Giuditta Bellerio Sidoli (1804–1871), Italian patriot and revolutionary
- John Sidoli (1854–1934), Australian rules footballer and cricket player
- Peter Sidoli (born 1980), Welsh rugby union player, brother of Robert Sidoli
- Robert Sidoli (born 1979), Welsh rugby union player
