= Giuditta Bellerio Sidoli =

Italian patriot and revolutionary protagonist

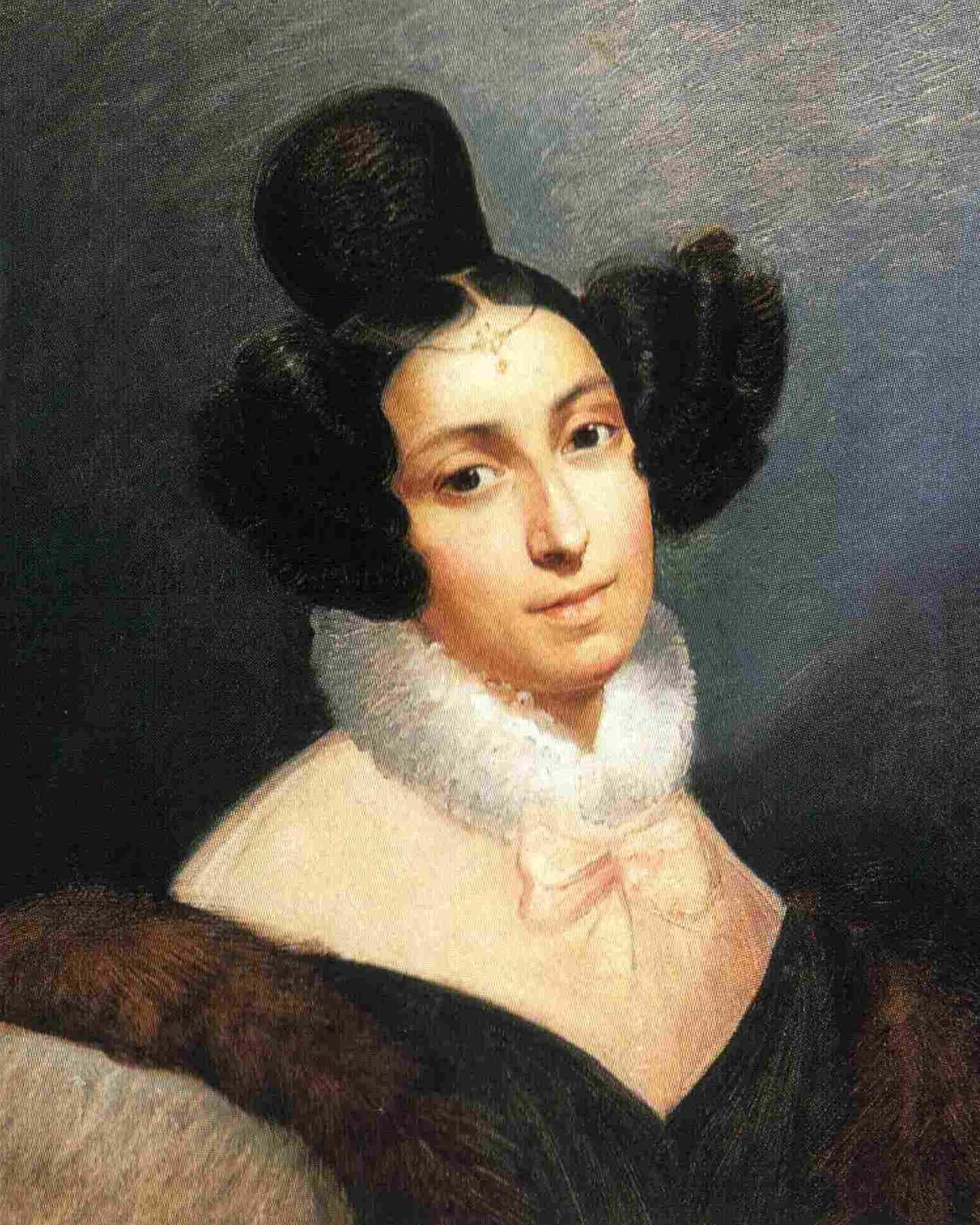
Giuditta Bellerio Sidoli

Giuditta Bellerio Sidoli (1804 – 28 March 1871) was an Italian patriot and revolutionary protagonist in multiple efforts for Italian unification. She was also the lover of Giuseppe Mazzini for a period and operated a salon in Turin for Italian expatriates.

== Biography ==
Giuditta Bellerio was born in 1804 in Milan, the daughter of a magistrate of the Napoleonic Kingdom of Italy. She married Giovanni Sidoli, a member of the Carbonari, at the age of sixteen. Following a revolution in 1820-1821, Giovanni Sidoli was forced to flee to Switzerland, and was later joined by Giuditta after she gave birth to a daughter. Giovanni died in 1828 of a lung ailment. Afterwards, she left for Giovanni's hometown Reggio Emilia to live with her in-laws and four children. During another wave of revolutionary activity in 1830-1831 she joined Ciro Menotti in revolutionary plots against the Duchy of Modena. She fled to Switzerland again as the Austrians put down the revolution.

In 1832, Giuditta settled with her brother in Marseille, running her apartment as a haven for Italian revolutionary exiles. There she met Giuseppe Mazzini and became his lover. Mazzini once told her "Smile at me always! It is the only smile that comes to me from life." Giuditta Sidoli would run the finances for Mazzini's new Young Italy society. Giuditta gave birth to a son named Joseph Aristide while in Marseilles, almost certainly fathered by Mazzini. Sidoli would continue to follow Mazzini and nurse him in his bad health as he moved to Geneva.

Sidoli attempted to return to Italy under an assumed name in 1833 in order to see her children, whom she had left behind when she left for Marseilles, but was prevented from entering. She did little else until 1852 when she operated a salon for Italian revolutionaries. By this time her love affair with Mazzini was effectively over, and they rarely saw each other again.

Giuditta Sidoli died of pneumonia in Turin on 28 March 1871. She refused last rites saying, she did, "not believe in the God of the Catholic Church—only in the God of exiles and the downtrodden."
