= Giovanni Livraghi =

Italian patriot

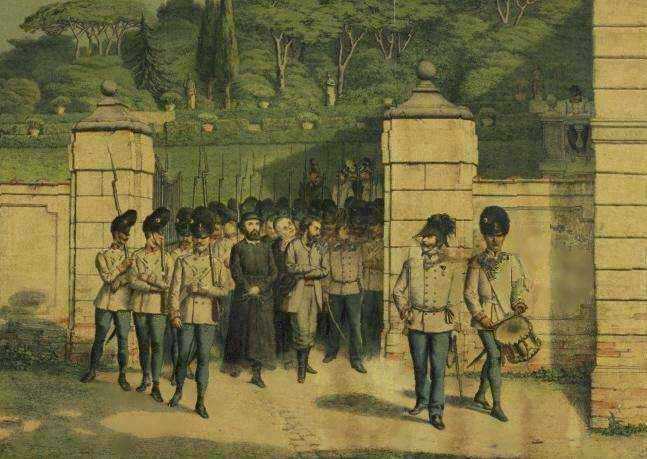
Ugo Bassi and Giovanni Livraghi led to execution (anonymous, ca. 1860)

Giovanni Livraghi (1819 in Milan – 8 August 1849 in Bologna) was an Italian patriot, who took part in various enterprises of Giuseppe Garibaldi, being part of the Italian legion which he founded in Montevideo in 1843 and participating, as a result, in the defense of the Roman Republic.

Captured with Ugo Bassi by the Austrians in Comacchio on 2 August 1849, he was transferred to Bologna in the evening of 7 August; considered, as Milanese and then Austrian subject, a deserter, he was shot with great haste on 8 August 1849. His story was portrayed in the 1990 Luigi Magni's film In nome del popolo sovrano, in which Luca Barbareschi played Livraghi.
