= Aurelio Saffi =

Italian politician

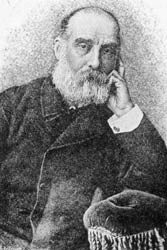

Triumvir of the Roman Republic
- In office 29 March 1849 – 1 July 1849 Serving with Carlo Armellini, Giuseppe Mazzini
- Preceded by: Office established
- Succeeded by: Office abolished

Personal details
- Born: Marco Aurelio Saffi; 13 August 1819 Forlì, Papal States
- Died: 10 April 1890 (aged 70) Forlì, Kingdom of Italy
- Party: Action Party (1848–1867)
- Education: University of Ferrara
- Profession: Politician, activist

Marco Aurelio Saffi (13 August 1819 – 10 April 1890) was a Roman and Italian politician, active during the period of Italian unification. He was an important figure in the radical republican current within the Risorgimento movement and close to its leader and chief inspiration, Giuseppe Mazzini.

== Biography ==
Saffi was born in Forlì, then part of the Papal States (now Emilia-Romagna region). He received an education in jurisprudence in Ferrara, but began political activity in his native city, protesting against the bad administration of the Papal legates. He was also a member of the communal and provincial councils between 1844 and 1845.

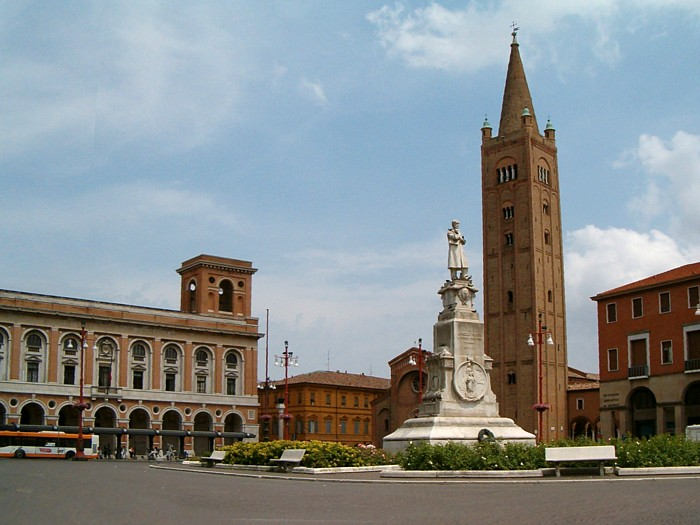
Piazza Aurelio Saffi, Forlì.

He soon became a fervent supporter of Mazzini's ideas, and in 1849 took part in the short-lived Roman Republic. Saffi was a member of the triumvirate that attempted to establish a democratic republic. The revolutionaries, however, were soon (June 1849) crushed by French troops, and Saffi retired to Liguria as an exile. From there he joined Mazzini in Switzerland, and then moved with him to London.

Saffi returned to Italy only in 1852, to plan a series of risings to be held in Milan. After the failure of the project in 1853, he fled to England again and was condemned in absentia to twenty years in prison. He was appointed the first teacher of Italian at the Taylor Institute, Oxford, in 1856. While in England he married (1857) Giorgina Saffi (born Georgiana Janet Craufurd). She was also a fervent supporter of Mazzini, and a feminist. They had four sons: Attilio Joseph (1858 - 1923), Emilio John (1861 - 1930), Charles Balilla Louis (1863 - 1896) and Rinaldo Arthur (1868 - 1929).

In 1860, Saffi moved to Naples, again with Mazzini. The following year he was elected a deputy in the Parliament of the newly formed Kingdom of Italy. Some years later he returned to London, where he remained until 1867. He spent his last days in his villa in the Forlì countryside, moving to Bologna where he had received a professorial chair. He also devoted himself to collecting historical material connected to his friend Giuseppe Mazzini.

He died at the age of seventy at his residence, Villa Saffi, which is now turned into a museum.

There is a statue of Saffi in the central square of his native Forlì.

== See also ==
- Roman Republic (19th century)
