= Young Europe =

1834–1836 Italian–Polish–German nationalist association

- Italian name: Giovine Europa
- German name: Junges Europa
- Polish name: Młoda Europa
- Founder: Giuseppe Mazzini
- Founded: April 15, 1834
- Dissolved: 1836
- Headquarters: Bern, Switzerland
- Ideology: Republicanism; Nationalism
- Political position: Left-wing
- Italian branch: Young Italy
- German branch: Young Germany
- Polish branch: Young Poland

Young Europe (Italian: Giovine Europa; German: Junges Europa; Polish: Młoda Europa) was an international political association founded in 1834 by Giuseppe Mazzini on the model of Young Italy. It was composed of the national societies of Young Italy, Young Poland and Young Germany, which, independent in their own spheres, acted in common, through a central committee, for the furthering of the principles of liberty, equality, and humanity in Europe. The headquarters of the society were in Switzerland, where, in 1835–36, the organization of a French society, Young France, was brought about. The activity of the society speedily aroused the opposition of the Swiss authorities, who expelled many of its members from the country.

"In the Spring of 1834, while at Berne, Mazzini and a dozen refugees from Italy, Poland and Germany founded a new association with the grandiose name of Young Europe. Its basic, and equally grandiose idea, was that, as the French Revolution of 1789 had enlarged the concept of individual liberty, another revolution would now be needed for national liberty; and his vision went further because he hoped that in the no doubt distant future free nations might combine to form a loosely federal Europe with some kind of federal assembly to regulate their common interests. [...] His intention was nothing less than to overturn the European settlement agreed in 1815 by the Congress of Vienna, which had reestablished an oppressive hegemony of a few great powers and blocked the emergence of smaller nations. [...] Mazzini hoped, but without much confidence, that his vision of a league or society of independent nations would be realized in his own lifetime. In practice Young Europe lacked the money and popular support for more than a short-term existence. Nevertheless he always remained faithful to the ideal of a united continent for which the creation of individual nations would be an indispensable preliminary."

Young Ireland was a contemporary nationalist organisation which, though not affiliated with Young Europe, took its name in reference to Young Italy and Young Europe.

== Historical Background and Origins ==
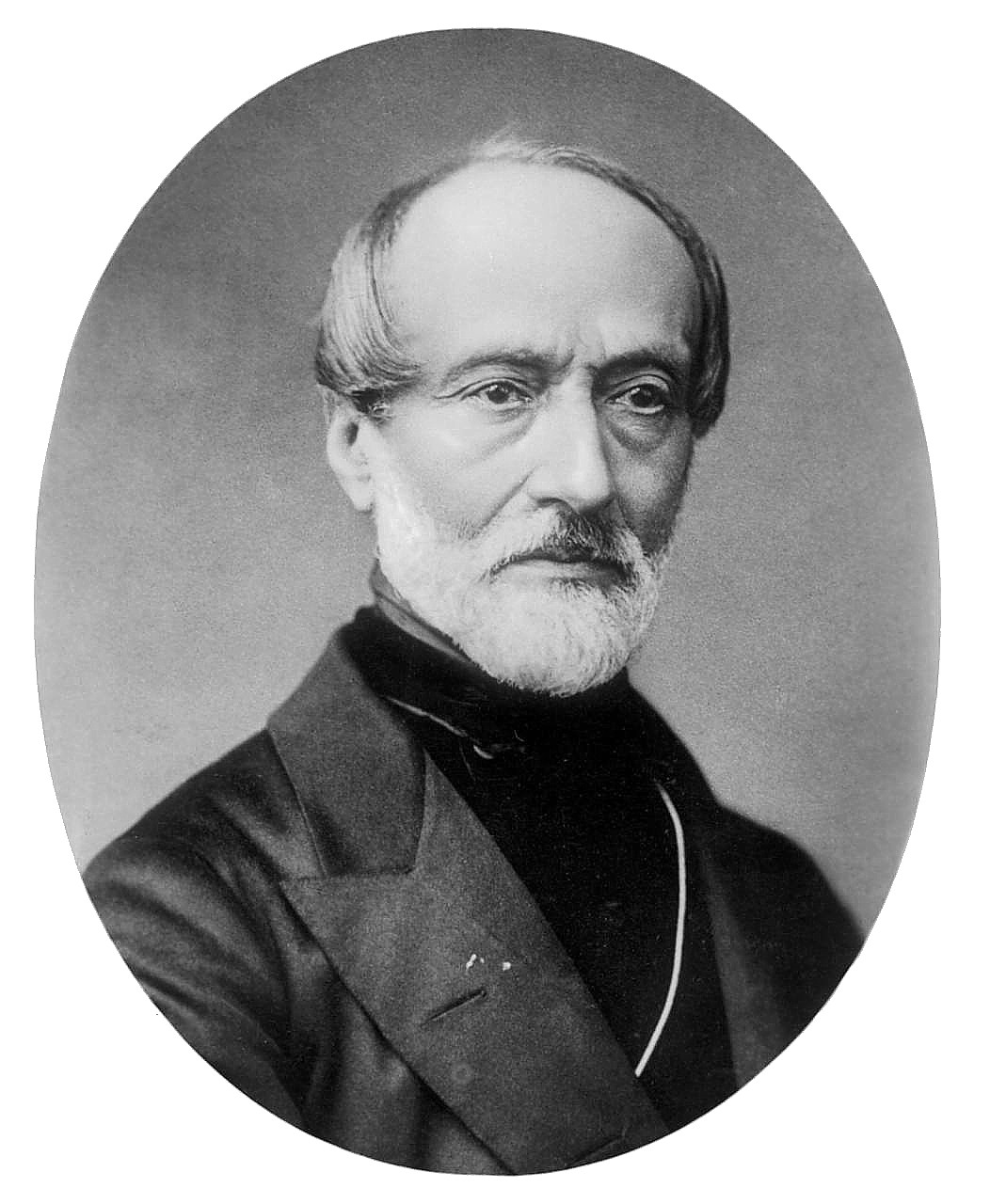
Giuseppe Mazzini

The territorial fragmentation of Italy, cemented by the provisions of the Congress of Vienna in 1815, led to the emergence of various political-revolutionary movements striving for national unity and democratic reorganization. One of the most significant movements of this kind was Young Italy, founded in 1831 by Giuseppe Mazzini. Due to similar problems in other states, associations modeled after Mazzini's idea also emerged there. These included New Germany (which later renamed itself Young Germany), Young Poland, and Young France. Shaken by the failure of his attempted coup in Savoy, Giuseppe Mazzini founded Young Europe on 15 April 1834 in Bern (Switzerland) to pool the movement's forces and achieve its goals of national unity and democracy across Europe. The founding assembly was attended by seven Italians, five Germans, and five Poles.

== Political Work and Repression ==
Politically, Young Europe operated under the motto "Liberty, Equality, Humanity" and aimed to overcome feudalism. The group's goal was a "rule of the peoples" in a democratic Europe. These objectives attracted the interest of numerous democrats to the young association, which consequently enjoyed a rapid influx of members. An incident on 27 July 1834 quickly put an end to the growing influence of Young Europe. On this day, German workers unfurled the black-red-gold tricolor at the Steinhölzli inn in Bern. A subsequent rumor that a coup attempt in southern Germany initiated by Young Europe was imminent prompted the ruling conservatives to threaten Switzerland with diplomatic consequences. Fearing political isolation, the Swiss government tightened association laws and expelled numerous members of Young Europe. This removal of their organizational base severely weakened the organization.

== Resurgence ==
Despite the severe repression, Giuseppe Mazzini refused to abandon his idea of a European revolution. Under his leadership, the scattered members of Young Europe reorganized once again in Switzerland and entered into fraternal agreements with newly formed organizations, including Young France, Young Switzerland, and Young Spain. Together, they promoted the establishment of workers' associations and engaged in workers' education.

== Collapse ==
The new, larger movement, which was led by a central committee in Bern, quickly proved difficult to manage. Individual national interests conflicted with Giuseppe Mazzini's concept of revolution, leading him to resign from the central committee in 1835 following internal tensions. At the same time, the Austrian Foreign Minister Metternich intervened with the Swiss government, threatening further diplomatic consequences if Switzerland did not take action against the democratic forces. Switzerland bowed to the pressure and expelled almost all foreign workers. This marked the definitive end of Young Europe.

== Literature ==
- Peter Röben: Historische Entwicklung der betrieblichen Mitbestimmung in Deutschland. Oldenburg 2006, (Oldenburg, University, Thesis, 2006).
- Andrea Weibel: "Young Europe" in German, French and Italian in the online Historical Dictionary of Switzerland.
