= Ugo Bassi =

Italian priest

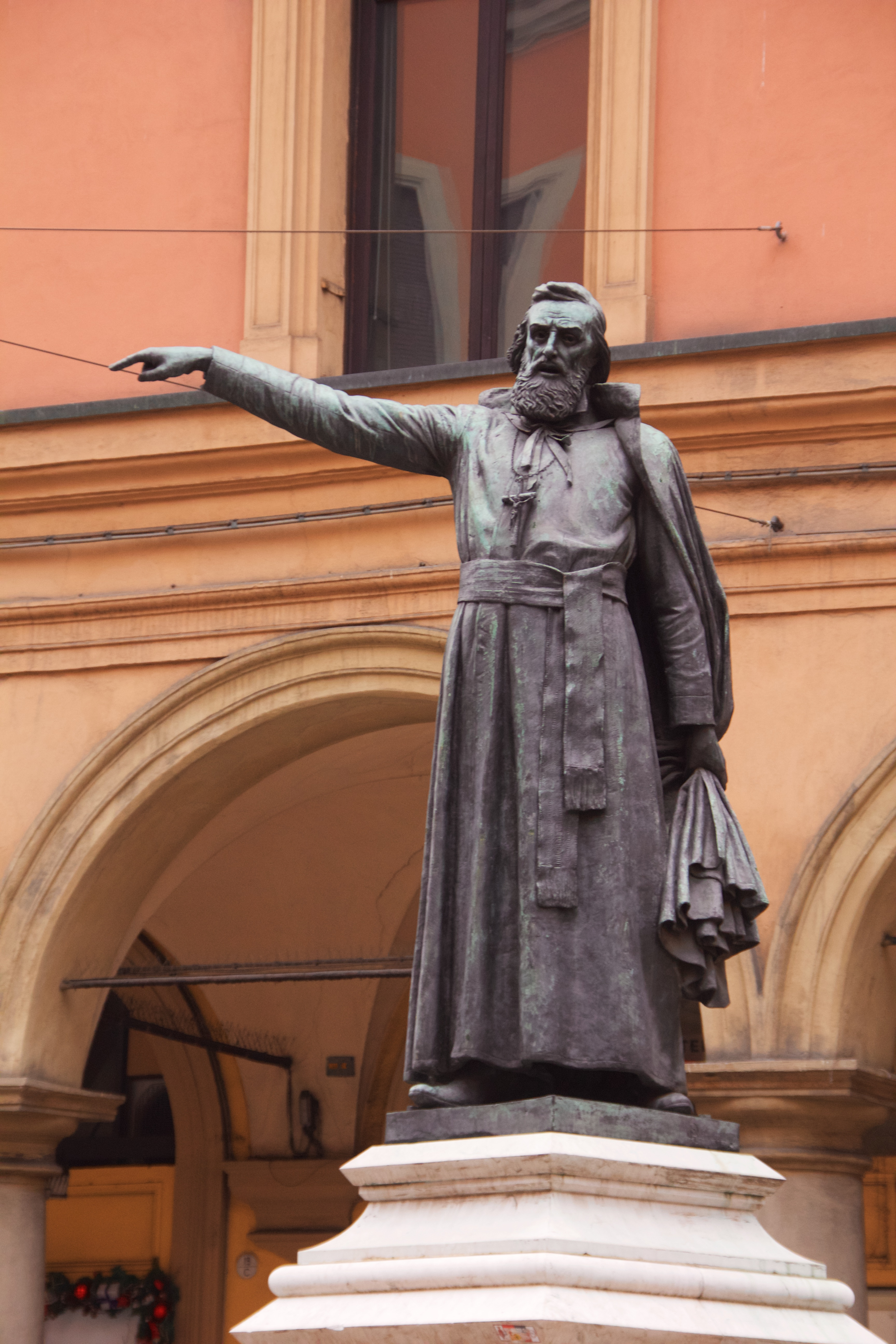
- Statue of Ugo Bassi in Bologna
- Born: 12 August 1800; Cento, Emilia-Romagna
- Died: 8 August 1849 (aged 48); Bologna

Ugo Bassi (12 August 1800 – 8 August 1849) was a Roman Catholic priest and Italian nationalist. Bassi was born at Cento, Emilia-Romagna, and received his early education at University of Bologna.

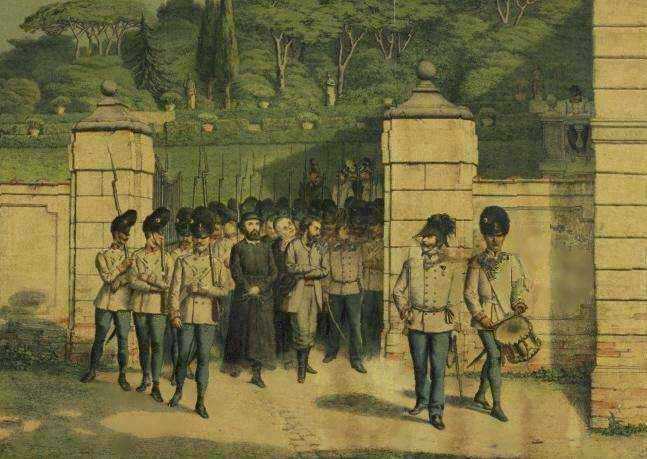
Bassi and Livraghi led to their execution place.

An unhappy love affair induced him to become a novice in the Barnabite order when eighteen years old. He returned to Rome, where he led a life of study and devotion, and entered into his ministry in 1833. It was as a preacher that he became famous, his sermons attracting large crowds owing to their eloquence and genuine enthusiasm. He lived chiefly in Bologna, but travelled all over Italy preaching and tending the poor. He was so poor himself that he often did not have food to eat.

At the outbreak of the revolutionary movements in 1848, Pope Pius IX still appeared to be a Liberal and an Italian nationalist. As a result, Father Bassi, filled with enthusiasm, joined General Durando's papal force to protect the frontiers as an army chaplain. His eloquence drew fresh recruits to the ranks, and he exercised great influence over the soldiers and people. When the Supreme Pontiff renounced all connection with the nationalist movement, it was only Bassi who could restrain the Bolognese Liberals in their indignation.

At Treviso, where he had followed Guidotti's volunteers against the Austrians, he received three wounds, delighted to shed his blood for Italy (12 May 1848). He was taken to Venice, and on his recovery, he marched unarmed at the head of the volunteers in the fight at Mestre. After the Pope's flight from Rome and the proclamation of the Roman Republic, Bassi took part with Garibaldi's forces against the French troops sent to re-establish the temporal power. He risked his life many times while tending the wounded under fire, and when Garibaldi was forced to retreat from Rome with his volunteers, his chaplain followed him in his march to San Marino.

When the legion broke up, Garibaldi escaped. But Father Bassi and a fellow-Garibaldian, Count Giovanni Livraghi, after a long manhunt, were captured near Comacchio. On being brought before the papal governor, Bassi said: "I am guilty of no crime save that of being an Italian like yourself. I have risked my life for Italy, and your duty is to do good to those who have suffered for her." The governor responded by handing the prisoners over to an Austrian officer. They were escorted to Bologna, convicted by a military tribunal with having been caught bearing arms. Both men were executed by firing squad on 8 August 1849.

The execution of Father Bassi enraged Liberals all over Europe.

In the Luigi Magni's film In the Name of the Sovereign People (1990), Ugo Bassi is played by Jacques Perrin.
