= In the Name of the Sovereign People =

- Directed by: Luigi Magni
- Written by: Luigi Magni
- Produced by: Titanus
- Starring: Luca Barbareschi; Serena Grandi; Nino Manfredi; Jacques Perrin; Elena Sofia Ricci; Alberto Sordi; Massimo Wertmüller
- Cinematography: Giuseppe Lanci
- Edited by: Ruggero Mastroianni
- Music by: Nicola Piovani
- Release date: 1990
- Running time: 110 min
- Country: Italy
- Language: Italian

In the Name of the Sovereign People (Italian: In nome del popolo sovrano) is a 1990 Italian historical comedy drama film written and directed by Luigi Magni. The film takes place during the First Italian War of Independence. It won the David di Donatello for best costumes.

== Plot ==
In Rome, in the Papal States, in 1849, Pope Pius IX was forced to go to Gaeta, Kingdom of the Two Sicilies, in exile because of the advent of the Roman Republic. A few months later, the French troops of General Oudinot and the Austrian troops try to retake Rome to impose the restoration of the temporal power, which some of the citizens, especially the nobles, support.

In the house of the Marquis Arquati, a papal noble, live his son Eufemio, who is weak and shy, and his wife, Cristina, who had been forced by the family to marry him; his daughter, Giacinta; and the servant-mistress, Rosetta. Cristina, a supporter of the Republic, has become the lover of Captain Giovanni Livraghi, a Milanese revolutionary who rushed to the aid of the republicans and is a great friend of the Barnabite friar Ugo Bassi, who opposes the temporal power and supports the rights of the people but is always faithful to his mission as a priest.

Among the insurgent commoners is notably Angelo Brunetti, also known as "Ciceruacchio", accompanied by his 12-year-old son, Lorenzo. Meanwhile, Marquis Eufemio, who suddenly falls in love with his wife, whom he sees transfigured by his political passion and by that of Livraghi, is determined to kill his rival and so reaches him, while fighting on the Janiculum, where he instead saves him by killing a Frenchman, who was about to hit him dead.

After many clashes, the surviving republican patriots, defeated by foreign troops, leave Rome and head in disorder towards the north. Cristina tries to reach Giovanni, who left with Bassi to join Giuseppe Garibaldi, but Bassi and Livraghi are arrested and sentenced to death, and the woman tries in vain to save her lover by begging for pardon from a powerful prelate, who is a friend. Before the execution, Ugo is denied the sacraments, and Giovanni chooses to confess to him.

Meanwhile, Eufemio is still looking for his wife, whom he wants to kill to take revenge, but after Livraghi's death, he sees her again, and everything has then changed between them. Cristina now esteems him for his generous gesture on the Janiculum, which made him risk his life. The couple reunite, and she follows her husband, who decides to enlist the army of the Piedmonteses for the unification of Italy. Meanwhile, Ciceruacchio and his son are also shot, and Pope Pius IX returns to rule in Rome.

In 1870 Eufemio, along with the troops of the united Kingdom of Italy, enters in Rome.

== Cast ==
- Luca Barbareschi as Giovanni Livraghi
- Elena Sofia Ricci as Cristina Arquati
- Alberto Sordi as Marquis Arquati
- Nino Manfredi as Angelo Brunetti, also known as "Ciceruacchio"
- Jacques Perrin as Ugo Bassi
- Massimo Wertmüller as Eufemio Arquati
- Carlo Croccolo as Carlo Luciano Bonaparte
- Serena Grandi as Rosetta
- Elena Berera as Giacinta Arquati
- Gianni Bonagura as Pope Pius IX
- Luigi De Filippo as Monsignor Bedini
- Roberto Herlitzka as Giuseppe Gioachino Belli
- Gianni Garko as General Nicolas Charles Victor Oudinot
- Costantino Meloni as Lorenzo Brunetti
- Camillo Milli as the Venetian priest
- Lorenzo Flaherty as the French officer
