= Giuseppe Mazzini =

Italian activist, politician, journalist and philosopher (1805–1872)

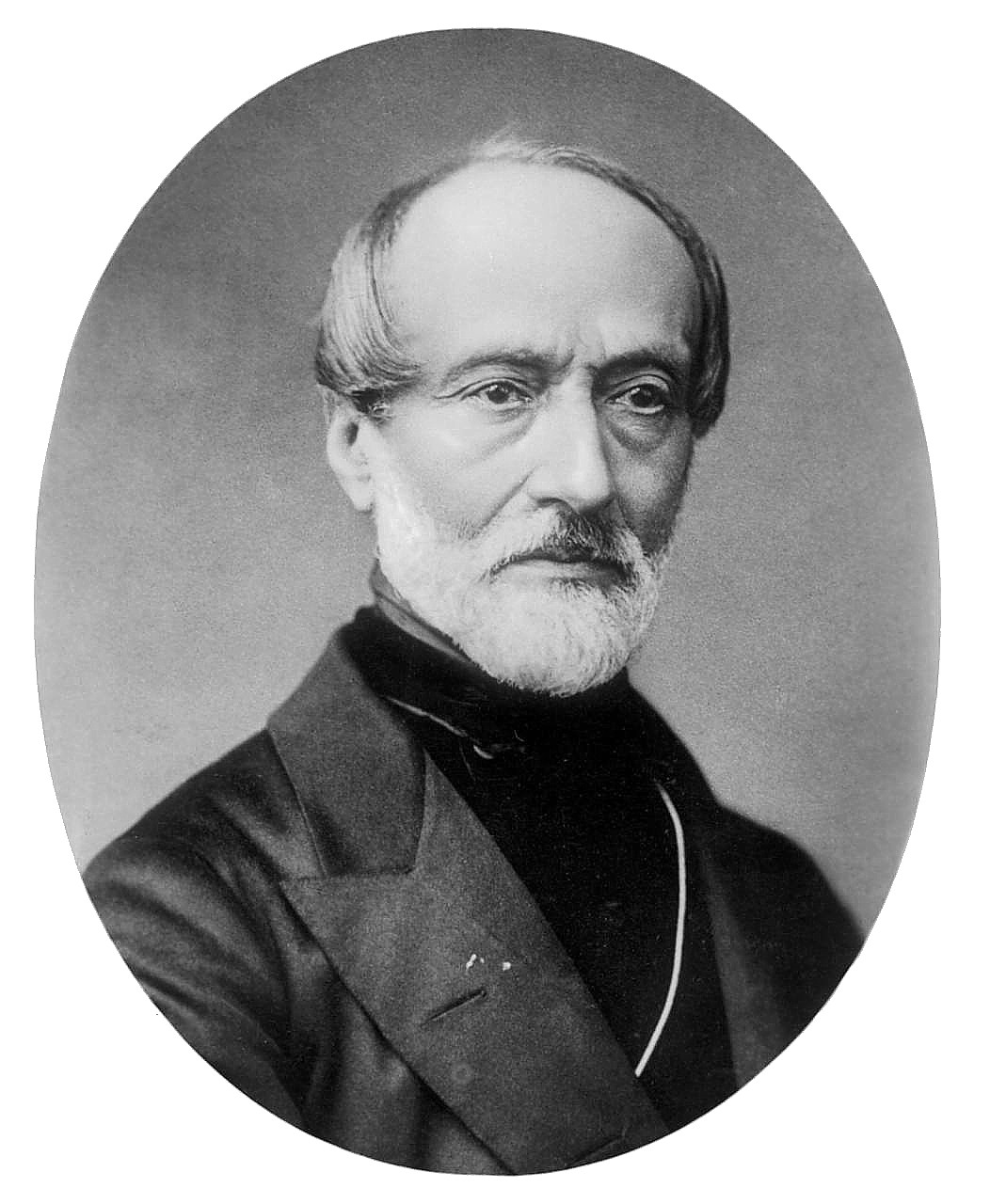
- Mazzini in 1860

Triumvir of the Roman Republic
- In office 5 February – 3 July 1849 Serving with Aurelio Saffi, Carlo Armellini
- Preceded by: Aurelio Saliceti
- Succeeded by: Aurelio Saliceti

Personal details
- Born: 22 June 1805 Genoa, Gênes, First French Empire
- Died: 10 March 1872 (aged 66) Pisa, Tuscany, Kingdom of Italy
- Party: Young Italy (1831–1848); Italian National Association (1848–1853); Action (1853–1867); Young Europe
- Education: University of Genoa
- Profession: Lawyer; journalist; writer

Philosophical work
- Era: Modern philosophy; 19th-century philosophy
- Region: Western philosophy; Italian philosophy
- School: Italian nationalism; Romanticism
- Main interests: History; theology; politics
- Notable works: An essay on the duties of man
- Notable ideas: Pan-Europeanism, irredentism (Italian), popular democracy, class collaboration, civic religion

Signature
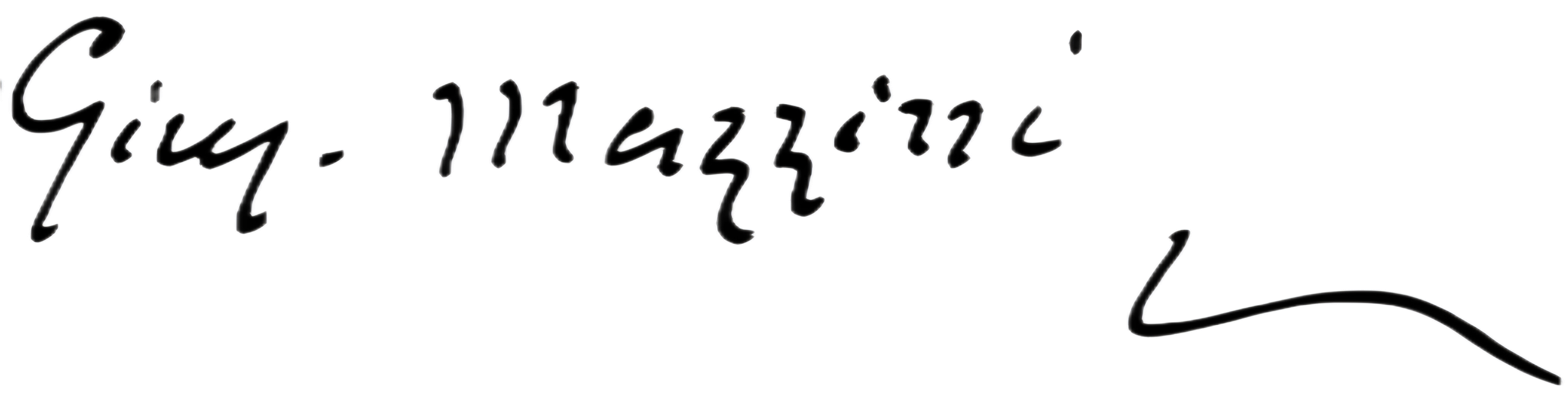

Giuseppe Mazzini (Note: English: UK: /mætˈsiːni/ mat-SEE-nee, US: /mɑːtˈsiːni, mɑːdˈziːni/ maht-SEE-nee, mahd-ZEE-nee; Italian: [dʒuˈzɛppe matˈtsiːni].) (22 June 1805 – 10 March 1872) was an Italian politician, lawyer, journalist, philosopher, and political activist who worked for the unification of Italy (Risorgimento) and was a major leader of the Italian revolutionary movement. His efforts helped bring about the independent and unified Italy in place of the several separate states, many dominated by foreign powers, that existed until the 19th century. An Italian nationalist in the historical radical tradition and a proponent of a republicanism of social-democratic inspiration, Mazzini "helped define the European movement for popular democracy in a republican state." He is widely known as the "Prophet of Italian Nationalism".

Mazzini's thoughts influenced the Italian and European republican movements, the Constitution of Italy, and Europeanism, as well as later political leaders including Benito Mussolini, who was later the Fascist leader of Italy, former U.S. President Woodrow Wilson, former U.K. Prime Minister David Lloyd George, Indian independence movement figures such as Subhas Chandra Bose, Mahatma Gandhi, Jawaharlal Nehru, and Vinayak Damodar Savarkar, the founder of Hindutva. His ideas also influenced Sun Yat-sen, former President of the Provisional Government of the Republic of China (1912–1913), and founder of the Three Principles of the People (also known as Tridemism). In addition, Giuseppe Garibaldi, one of his most devoted followers, was deeply inspired by Mazzini's revolutionary vision and later played a decisive role in the Risorgimento through his military campaigns.

However, Mazzini's methods were often criticised, as his reliance on secret revolutionary groups and uprisings led to repeated failures and repression. Some historians also argue that his refusal to compromise with the monarchy made his goals harder to achieve, even though his ideas ultimately inspired the success of Italian unification.

== Biography ==
=== Early years ===
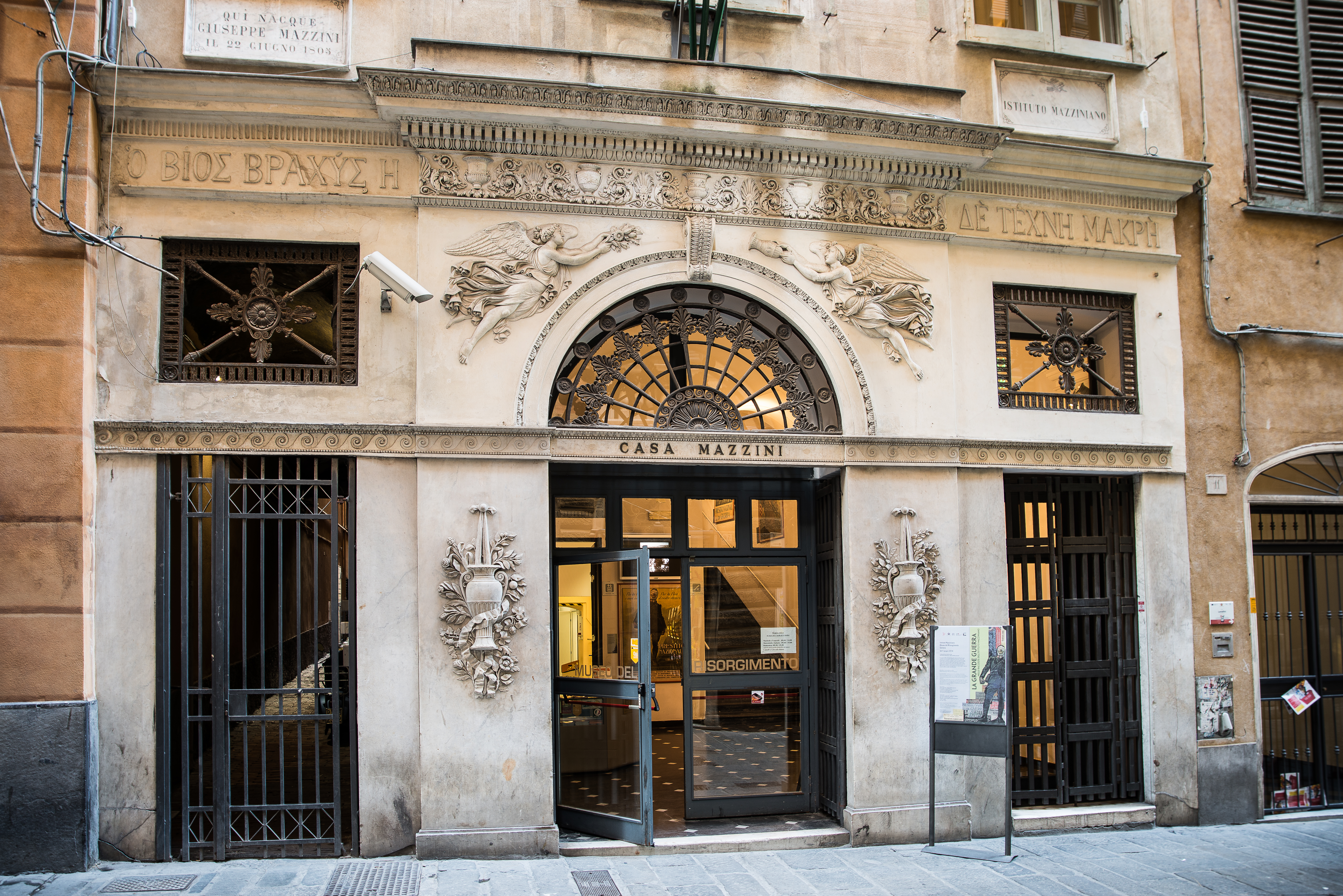
Mazzini's house in Genoa, now seat of the Museum of the Risorgimento and of the Mazzinian Institute

Mazzini was born in Genoa, which had recently been annexed by the First French Empire. His father Giacomo Mazzini, originally from Chiavari, was a university professor who had adhered to Jacobin ideology, while his mother Maria Drago was renowned for her beauty and religious Jansenist fervour. From a very early age, Mazzini showed good learning qualities as well as a precocious interest in politics and literature. He was admitted to university at the age of 14, graduating in law in 1826 and initially practised as a "poor man's lawyer". Mazzini also hoped to become a historical novelist or a dramatist and in the same year wrote his first essay, Dell'amor patrio di Dante ("On Dante's Patriotic Love"), published in 1827, and inspired by feelings of Romanticism. In 1828–1829, he collaborated with the Genoese newspaper L'Indicatore Genovese which was soon closed by the Piedmontese authorities. He then became one of the leading authors of L'Indicatore Livornese, published at Livorno by Francesco Domenico Guerrazzi, until this paper was closed down by the authorities.

An admirer of Foscolo and Byron, he was part of a circle of Romantic writers, participating in the debate of the time against the classicists. In 1827, Mazzini travelled to Tuscany, where he became a member of the Carbonari, a secret association with political purposes. On 31 October 1830, he was arrested at Genoa and interned at Savona. In early 1831, he was released from prison, but confined to a small hamlet. He chose exile instead, moving to Geneva, Switzerland.

=== Failed insurrections ===
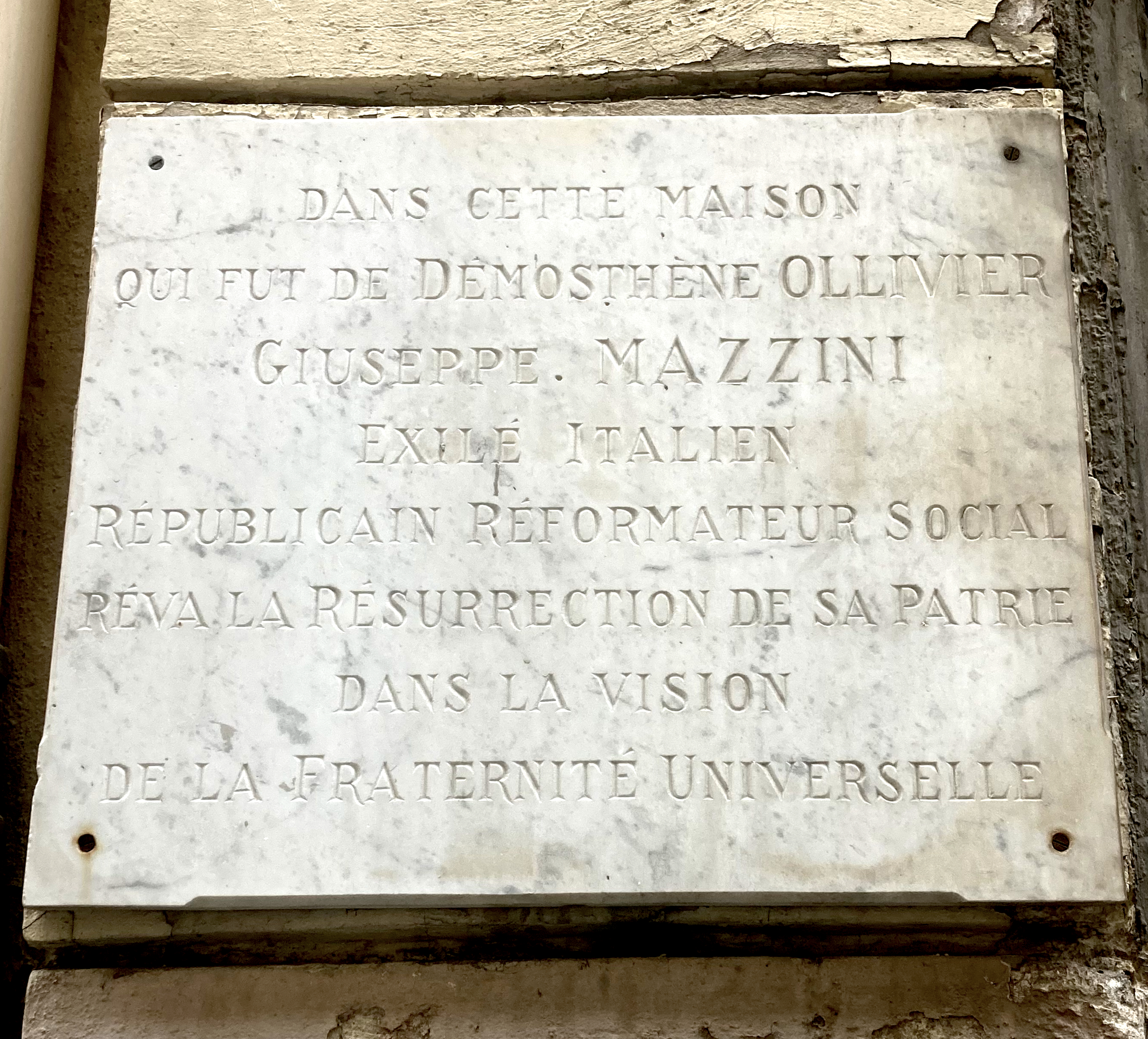
Mazzini in Marseilles

In 1831, Mazzini went to Marseille, where he became a popular figure among the Italian exiles. He was a frequent visitor to the apartment of Giuditta Bellerio Sidoli, a Modenese widow who became his lover. In August 1832 Giuditta Sidoli gave birth to a boy, almost certainly Mazzini's son, whom she named Joseph Démosthène Adolpe Aristide after members of the family of Démosthène Ollivier, with whom Mazzini was staying. The Olliviers took care of the child in June 1833 when Giuditta and Mazzini left for Switzerland. The child died in February 1835.

Mazzini organized a new political society called Young Italy. It was a secret society formed to promote Italian unification: "One, free, independent, republican nation." Mazzini believed that a popular uprising would create a unified Italy, and would touch off a European-wide revolutionary movement. The group's motto was God and the People, and its basic principle was the unification of the several states and kingdoms of the peninsula into a single republic as the only true foundation of Italian liberty. The new nation had to be "One, Independent, Free Republic".

Mazzini's political activism met some success in Tuscany, Abruzzi, Sicily, Piedmont, and his native Liguria, especially among several military officers. Young Italy counted about 60,000 adherents in 1833, with branches in Genoa and other cities. In that year Mazzini first attempted insurrection, which would spread from Chambéry (then part of the Kingdom of Sardinia), Alessandria, Turin, and Genoa. However, the Savoy government discovered the plot before it could begin and many revolutionaries (including Vincenzo Gioberti) were arrested. The repression was ruthless: 12 participants were executed, while Mazzini's best friend and director of the Genoese section of the Giovine Italia, Jacopo Ruffini, killed himself. Mazzini was tried in absentia and sentenced to death.

Despite this setback, whose victims later created numerous doubts and psychological strife in Mazzini, he organized another uprising for the following year. A group of Italian exiles were to enter Piedmont from Switzerland and spread the revolution there, while Giuseppe Garibaldi, who had recently joined Young Italy, was to do the same from Genoa. However, the Piedmontese troops easily crushed the new attempt. Denis Mack Smith writes:

In the spring of 1834, while at Bern, Mazzini and a dozen refugees from Italy, Poland, and Germany founded a new association with the grandiose name of Young Europe. Its basic, and equally grandiose idea, was that, as the French Revolution of 1789 had enlarged the concept of individual liberty, another revolution would now be needed for national liberty, and his vision went further because he hoped that in the no doubt distant future free nations might combine to form a loosely federal Europe with some kind of federal assembly to regulate their common interests. ... His intention was nothing less than to overturn the European settlement agreed in 1815 by the Congress of Vienna, which had reestablished an oppressive hegemony of a few great powers and blocked the emergence of smaller nations. ... Mazzini hoped, but without much confidence, that his vision of a league or society of independent nations would be realized in his own lifetime. In practice, Young Europe lacked the money and popular support for more than a short-term existence. Nevertheless, he always remained faithful to the ideal of a united continent for which the creation of individual nations would be an indispensable preliminary.

On 28 May 1834, Mazzini was arrested at Solothurn, and exiled from Switzerland. He moved to Paris, where he was again imprisoned on 5 July. He was released only after promising he would move to England. Mazzini, together with a few Italian friends, moved in January 1837 to live in London in very poor economic conditions.

=== Exile in London ===
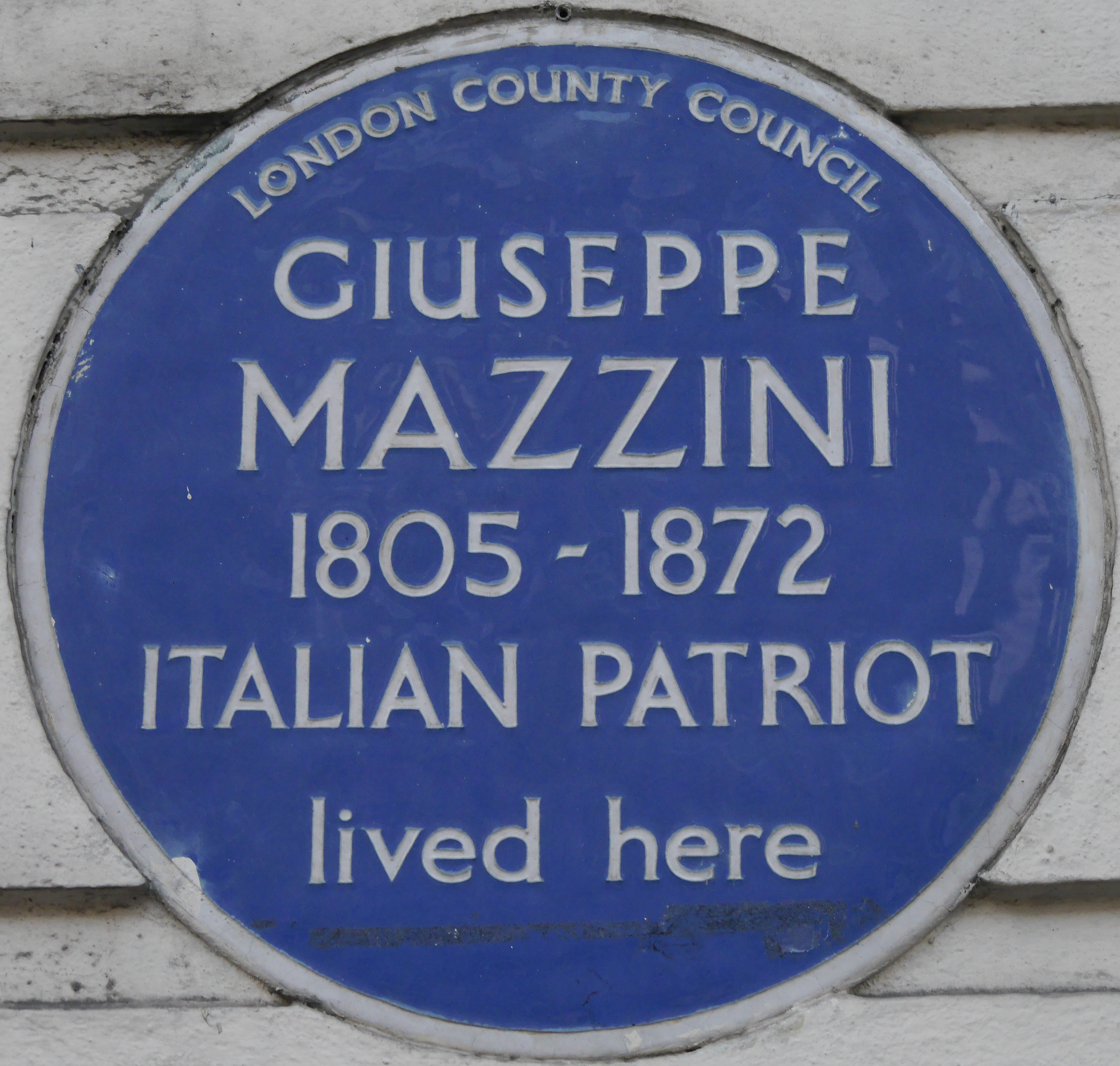
Blue plaque, 183 North Gower Street, London

On 30 April 1840, Mazzini reformed the Giovine Italia in London, and on 10 November of the same year, he began issuing the Apostolato popolare ("Apostleship of the People").

A succession of failed attempts at promoting further uprisings in Sicily, Abruzzi, Tuscany, and Lombardy-Venetia discouraged Mazzini for a long period, which dragged on until 1840. He was also abandoned by Sidoli, who had returned to Italy to rejoin her children. The help of his mother pushed Mazzini to create several organizations aimed at the unification or liberation of other nations, in the wake of Giovine Italia: "Young Germany", "Young Poland", and "Young Switzerland", which were under the aegis of "Young Europe" (Giovine Europa). He also created an Italian school for poor people active from 10 November 1841 at 5 Greville Street, London. From London he also wrote an endless series of letters to his agents in Europe and South America and made friends with Thomas Carlyle and his wife Jane. A half century later, the "Young Europe" movement also inspired a group of young Turkish army cadets and students who named themselves the "Young Turks".

In 1843, he organized another riot in Bologna, which attracted the attention of two young officers of the Austrian Navy, Attilio and Emilio Bandiera. With Mazzini's support, they landed near Cosenza (Kingdom of Naples) but were arrested and executed. Mazzini accused the British government of having passed information about the expeditions to the Neapolitans, and the question was raised in the British Parliament. When it was admitted that his private letters had indeed been opened, and its contents revealed by the Foreign Office to the Austrian and Neapolitan governments, Mazzini gained popularity and support among the British liberals, who were outraged by such a blatant intrusion of the government into his private correspondence.

In 1847, he moved again to London, where he wrote a long "open letter" to Pope Pius IX, whose apparently liberal reforms had gained him a momentary status as a possible paladin of the unification of Italy, but The Pope did not reply. He also founded the People's International League. By 8 March 1848, Mazzini was in Paris, where he launched a new political association, the Associazione Nazionale Italiana. In apologising for not being able to attend the first annual celebration of the Leeds Redemption Society (a communitarian experiment) on 7 January 1847 he offered to become a subscriber.

=== 1848–1849 revolts ===
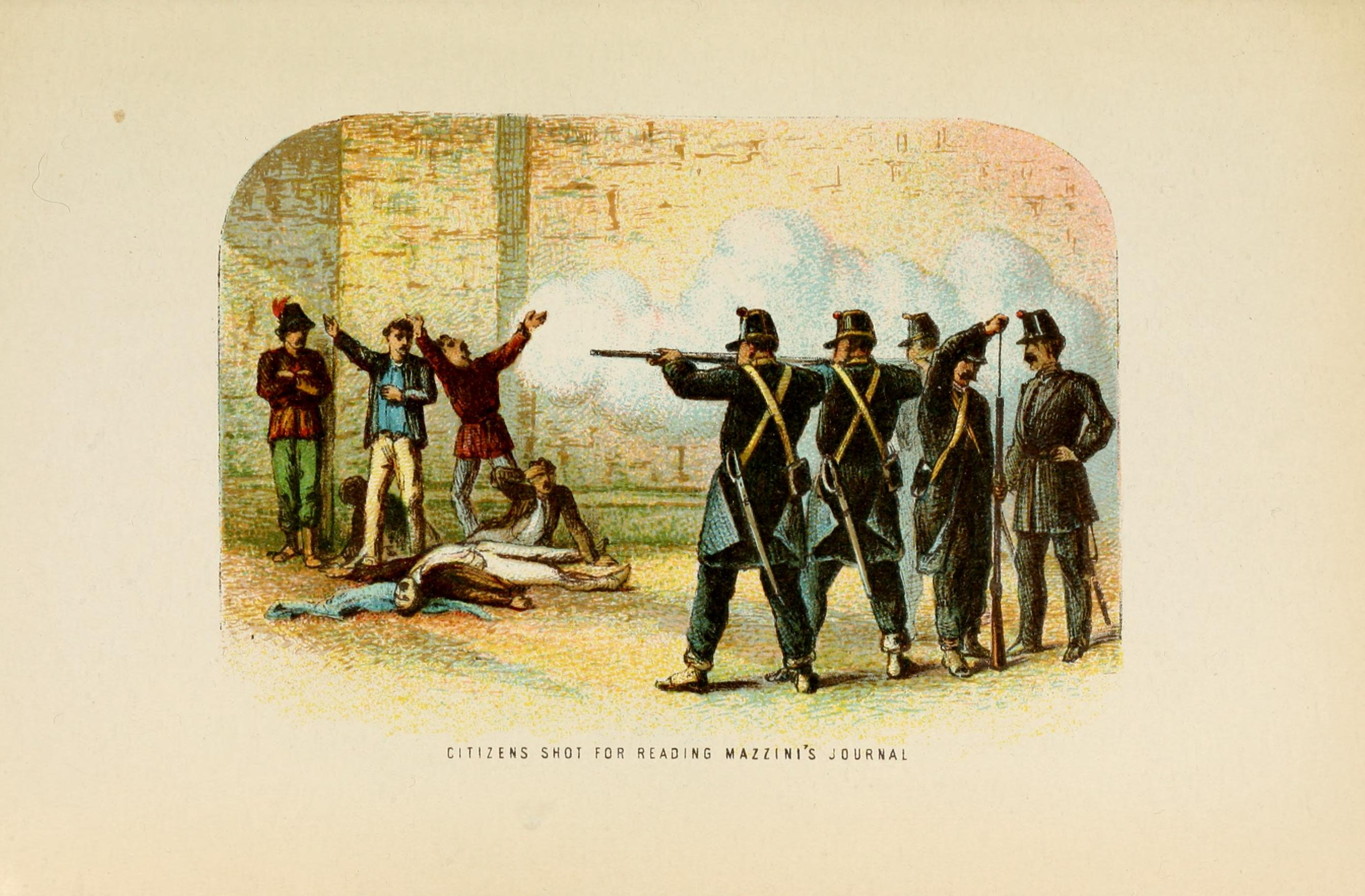
Citizens shot for reading Mazzini Journals (compare with Édouard Manet, The Execution of Emperor Maximilian)

On 7 April 1848, Mazzini reached Milan, whose population had rebelled against the Austrian garrison and established a provisional government. The First Italian War of Independence, started by the Piedmontese king Charles Albert to exploit the favourable circumstances in Milan, turned into a total failure. Mazzini, who had never been popular in the city because he wanted Lombardy to become a republic instead of joining Piedmont, abandoned Milan. He joined Garibaldi's irregular force at Bergamo, moving to Switzerland with him. Mazzini was one of the founders and leaders of the Action Party, the first organized party in the history of Italy.

On 9 February 1849, a republic was declared in Rome, with Pius IX already having been forced to flee to Gaeta the preceding November. On the same day the Republic was declared, Mazzini reached the city. He was appointed, together with Carlo Armellini and Aurelio Saffi, as a member of the triumvirate of the new republic on 29 March, becoming soon the true leader of the government and showing good administrative capabilities in social reforms. However, the French troops called by the Pope made clear that the resistance of the Republican troops, led by Garibaldi, was in vain. On 12 July 1849, Mazzini set out for Marseille, from where he moved again to Switzerland.

=== Late activities ===
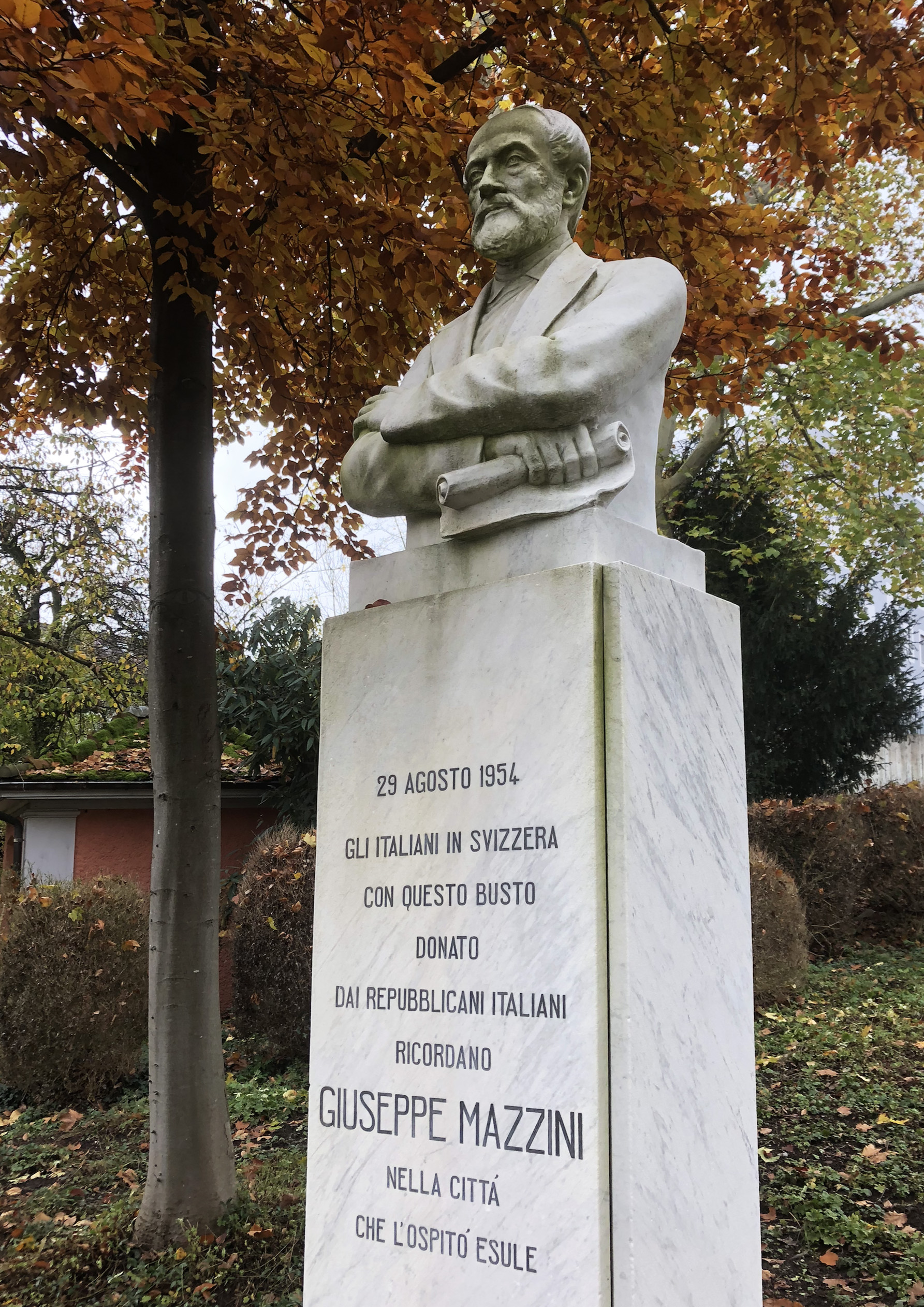
Giuseppe Mazzini memorial, Grenchen, canton of Solothurn, Switzerland

Mazzini spent all of 1850 hiding from the Swiss police. In July he founded the association Amici di Italia ("Friends of Italy") in London, to attract consensus towards the Italian liberation cause. Failed riots in Mantua (1852) and the abortive Milan Uprising (1853) were a crippling blow for the Mazzinian organization, whose prestige never recovered. He later opposed the alliance signed by Savoy with Austria for the Crimean War. Also in vain was the expedition of Felice Orsini in Carrara of 1853–1854.

In 1856, he returned to Genoa to organize a series of uprisings: the only serious attempt was that of Carlo Pisacane in Calabria, which again met a disappointing end. Mazzini managed to escape the police but was condemned to death by default. From this moment on, Mazzini was more of a spectator than a protagonist of the Italian Risorgimento, whose reins were now strongly in the hands of the Savoyard monarch Victor Emmanuel II and his skilled prime minister, Camillo Benso, Conte di Cavour. The latter defined him as "Chief of the Assassins".

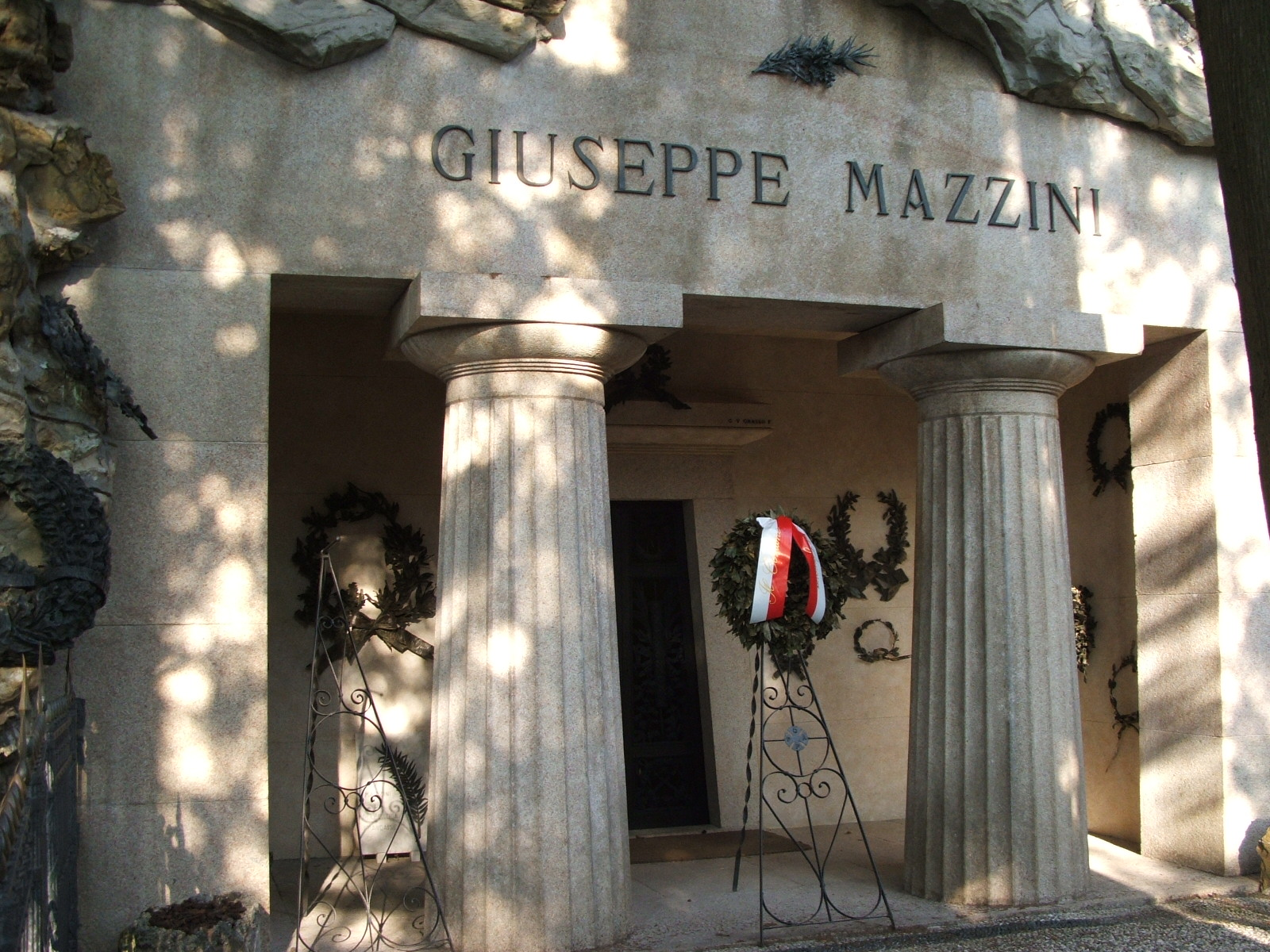
Mausoleum of Mazzini in the Staglieno cemetery of Genoa

In 1858, he founded another journal in London called Pensiero e azione ("Thought and Action"). On 21 February 1859, together with 151 republicans, he signed a manifesto against the alliance between Piedmont and the Emperor of France which resulted in the Second War of Italian Independence and the conquest of Lombardy. On 2 May 1860, he tried to reach Garibaldi, who was going to launch his famous Expedition of the Thousand in southern Italy. In the same year, he released Doveri dell'uomo ("Duties of Man"), a synthesis of his moral, political and social thoughts. In mid-September, he was in Naples, then under Garibaldi's dictatorship, but was invited by the local vice-dictator Giorgio Pallavicino to move away.

The new Kingdom of Italy was created in 1861 under the Savoy monarchy. In 1862, Mazzini joined Garibaldi in his failed attempt to free Rome. In 1866, Italy joined the Austro-Prussian War and gained Venetia. At this time, Mazzini frequently spoke out against how the unification of his country was being achieved. In 1867, he refused a seat in the Italian Chamber of Deputies. In 1870, he tried to start a rebellion in Sicily and was arrested and imprisoned in Gaeta. In October, he was freed in the amnesty declared after the Kingdom finally took Rome and returned to London in mid-December.

Mazzini died of pleurisy at the house known now as Domus Mazziniana in Pisa in 1872, aged 66. His body was embalmed by Paolo Gorini. His funeral was held in Genoa, with 100,000 people taking part in it.

== Ideology ==
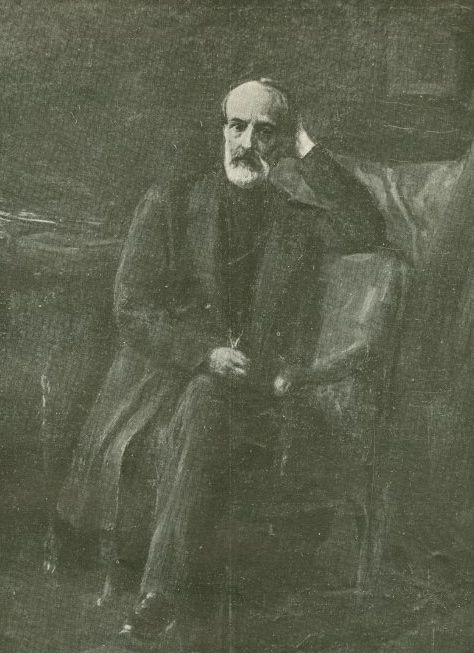
Mazzini late in his career

An Italian nationalist, Mazzini was a fervent advocate of republicanism and envisioned a united, free and independent Italy. Unlike his contemporary Giuseppe Garibaldi, who was also a republican, Mazzini refused to swear an oath of allegiance to the House of Savoy until after the Capture of Rome. He and his followers were sensitive to the question of social justice, starting a dialogue with socialism, and Mazzini in particular finding many affinities with the Saint-Simonians. At the same time, Mazzini was vigorously opposed to Marxism, which for him was "a dreadful perversion of utilitarianism because of its insistence on class interests, especially class struggle, a conflictual vision that could not harmonize with Mazzini's unitarianism". Mazzini also rejected the classical liberal principles of the Age of Enlightenment based on the doctrine of individualism, which he criticized as "presupposing either metaphysical materialism or political atheism". In the first volume of Carl Landauer's European Socialism, Mazzini is mentioned alongside Garibaldi as outstanding "Italian revolutionaries". Albert Charles Brouse argued that "socialism is found in its entirety in the doctrine of Mazzini", his republicanism being both "democratic and social".

In 1871, Mazzini condemned the radical, anti-religious and revolutionary socialist revolt in France that led to the creation of the short-lived Paris Commune. This caused Karl Marx to refer to Mazzini as a reactionary after 1848. It also prompted anarchist Mikhail Bakunin to write The Political Theology of Mazzini and the International, whose "defence of the International and the Paris Commune caused a stir in Italy and provoked many renunciations of Mazzini and declarations of support for the International in the press", even leading to "the first nationwide increase in membership in the organisation". In an interview by R. Landor from 1871, Marx stated that Mazzini's ideas represented "nothing better than the old idea of a middle-class republic". Marx believed that Mazzini's point of view, especially after the Revolutions of 1848 and the Paris Commune, had become reactionary and the proletariat had nothing to do with it.

In another interview, Marx described Mazzini as "that everlasting old ass". In turn, Mazzini described Marx as "a destructive spirit whose heart was filled with hatred rather than love of mankind" and declared that "[d]espite the communist egalitarianism which [Marx] preaches, he is the absolute ruler of his party, admittedly he does everything himself, but he is also the only one to give orders and he tolerates no opposition". While Mazzini saw the Paris Commune as "a socially divisive mistake", many other radicals "followed the socialist lead and mythologised the Commune as a social revolution ('the glorius harbinger of a new society' in Karl Marx's words)". This event "allowed a significant section of the radical left, especially a younger generation of radicals led by the poet and satirist Felice Cavallotti and grouped around the newspaper Il Gazzettino Rosa, to break openly and decisively with both Mazzini and the principles and methods of Mazzinian politics. While Il Gazzettino Rosa praised Mazzini as "the 'saviour' and teacher of Italy", it insisted:

We have no more idols, we don't accept abstruse, incomprehensible formulas. ... What we object to in Mazzini is not his opinion in itself, as much as his opinion erected into a system and a political dogma. We are materialists, but we don't make a political school out of our materialism. To us it does not matter if one believes or does not believe in God. ... [I]nstead Mazzini wants to impose a new religion on us.

According to Lucy Riall, "the emphasis by younger radicals on the 'social question' was paralleled by an increase in what was called 'internationalist' or socialist activity (mostly Bakuninist anarchism) throughout northern and southern Italy, which was given a big boost by the Paris Commune." The rise of this socialism "represented a genuine challenge to Mazzini and the Mazzinian emphasis on politics and culture, and Mazzinis' death early in 1872 only served to underline the prevailing sense that his political era was over. Garibaldi now broke definitively with Mazzini, and this time he moved to the left of him. He came out entirely in favour of the Paris Commune and internationalism, and his stance brought him much closer to the younger radicals, ... and gave him a new lease on political life. From his support was born an initiative to relaunch a broad party of the radical left."

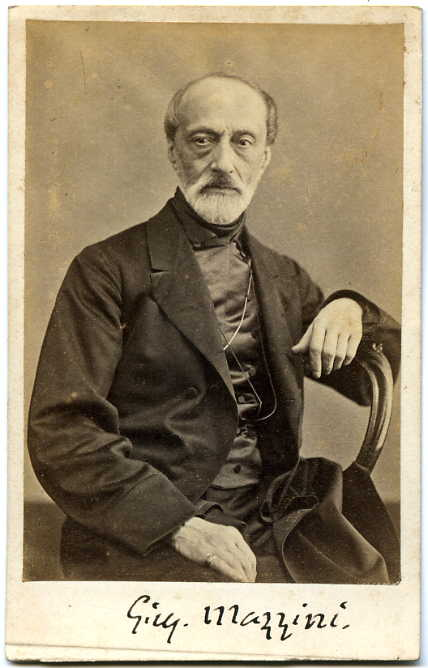
Photograph of Mazzini by Domenico Lama

For Seamus Flahert, Henry Hyndman, who was an admirer of Mazzini, thought that "Mazzini's greatness ... was obscured for younger socialists by his 'opposition to Marx in the early days of the 'International', and his vigorous condemnation a little later of the Paris Commune", insisting that "Mazzini's conception of the conduct of human life' had been 'a high and noble one'", praising the "No duties without rights" mention in the "General Rules" that Marx composed and passed as "a concession Marx made to Mazzini's followers within the organisation". In his two-volume autobiography, Hyndman spoke at length about Mazzini, even comparing him to Marx.

Christopher Bayly wrote that Mazzini "had arrived at similar conclusions", referring to "the Saint-Simonian ideas of association and Charles Fourier's 'law of attraction'", but "through an emotive process that owed little to rationalisation". As with the Christian socialist George D. Herron, Mazzini's socialism was "essentially a religious and moral revival". Mazzini rejected the Marxist doctrines of class struggle and materialism, stressing the need for class collaboration. Nonetheless, there was a more radical, socialist interpretation of Mazzini's doctrine within the Italian Republican Party, a Mazzinian party, where "there were many who believed the teachings of the Genoese patriot could be compatible with the Marxist doctrine and ... considered an alliance with the left-wing to be legitimate and desirable".

Mazzini's Italian nationalism has been described as "cosmopolitan patriotism". In Socialism: National or International, first published in 1942, Franz Borkenau described Mazzini as "that impressive Genoese" and "leader of the Italian underground democratic and unitarian movement". About Mazzini and the underground movement, Borkenau further wrote:

Mazzini did a great deal to organize and united this underground movement, known under the name of "Young Italy". He conceived the idea of parallel organizations in other European countries, which should all of them join in a "Young Europe" movement. The plan had only incipient success and Italy remained the sole stronghold of this underground movement. But the idea, though not its practical execution, caught on in other European countries. One reason of Mazzini's partial failure was the emergence of socialism in France and England. France, at any rate, had a strong underground movement, much stronger under Louis-Philippe than previously under the Bourbon restoration. But this movement gradually evolved towards the left. Ordinary democrats of the Mazzini type were no longer persecuted in France after 1830. But to the left of them arose more advanced movements.

When he was a socialist, Benito Mussolini harshly criticized Mazzini, "the religious Mazzini in particular", being "particularly opposed to Mazzini's 'sanctification'". After advocating interventionism in World War I and enlisting, Mussolini "found himself immersed in a patriotic atmosphere permeated by Mazzinian references".

=== Religion ===
Influenced by his Jansenist upbringing, Mazzini's thought is characterized by a strong religious fervour and a deep sense of spirituality. A deist who believed in divine providence, Mazzini described himself as a Christian and emphasized the necessity of faith and a relationship with God while vehemently denouncing atheism and rationalism. His motto was Dio e Popolo ("God and People"). Mazzini regarded patriotism as a duty and love for the fatherland as a divine mission, stating that the fatherland was "the home wherein God has placed us, among brothers and sisters linked to us by the family ties of a common religion, history, and language". According to A. James Gregor, "Mazzini's creed for the New Age thus radically distinguished itself from the orthodox Marxism of the nineteenth century. His Socialism was alive with moral purpose, rather than class identity, infused with exalted intent and specifically inspired by a sense of national, rather than class, mission. It saw itself, unabashedly, as a new religion, a 'climb through philosophy to faith'. It was a religion predicated on a 'living faith in one God, one Law, general and immutable ... and one End."

In his 1835 publication Fede e avvenire ("Faith and the Future"), Mazzini wrote: "We must rise again as a religious party. The religious element is universal and immortal. ... The initiators of a new world, we are bound to lay the foundations of a moral unity, a Humanitarian Catholicism." However, Mazzini's relationship with the Catholic Church and the Papacy was not always a kind one. While he initially supported Pope Pius IX upon his election, writing an open letter to him in 1847, Mazzini later published a scathing attack against the pope in his Sull'Enciclica di Papa Pio IX ("On the Encyclical of Pope Pius IX") in 1849. Although some of his religious views were at odds with the Catholic Church and the Papacy, with his writings often tinged with anti-clericalism, Mazzini also criticized Protestantism, stating that it is "divided and subdivided into a thousand sects, all founded on the rights of individual conscience, all eager to make war on one another, and perpetuating that anarchy of beliefs which is the sole true cause of the social and political disturbances that torment the peoples of Europe".

=== Thought and action ===
Mazzini rejected the concept of the "rights of man" which had developed during the Age of Enlightenment, arguing instead that individual rights were a duty to be won through hard work, sacrifice and virtue, rather than "rights" which were intrinsically owed to man. Mazzini outlined his thought in his Doveri dell'uomo ("Duties of Man"), published in 1860. Similarly, Mazzini formulated a concept known as "thought and action" in which thought and action must be joined and every thought must be followed by action, therefore rejecting intellectualism and the notion of divorcing theory from practice.

=== Women's rights ===
In "Duties of Man", Mazzini called for recognition of women's rights. After his many encounters with political philosophers in England, France and across Europe, Mazzini had decided that the principle of equality between men and women was fundamental to building a truly democratic Italian nation. He called for the end of women's social and judicial subordination to men. Mazzini's vigorous position heightened attention to gender among European thinkers who were already considering democracy and nationalism. He helped intellectuals see women's rights not merely as a peripheral topic, but rather as a fundamental goal necessary for the regeneration of old nations and the rebirth of new ones. Mazzini admired Jessie White Mario, who was described by Giuseppe Garibaldi as the "Bravest Woman of Modern Time". Mario joined Garibaldi's Redshirts for the 1859–1860 campaign during the Second Italian War of Independence. As a correspondent for the Daily News, she witnessed almost every fight that had brought on the unification of Italy.

== Legacy ==
Mazzini's socio-political thought has been referred to as Mazzinianism and his worldview as the Mazzinian conception, terms that were later used by Mussolini and Italian fascists, such as Giovanni Gentile, to describe their political ideology and spiritual conception of life.

In the first volume of his Reminiscences, Carl Schurz gives a biographical sketch of Mazzini and recalls two meetings he had with him when they were both in London in 1851. While the book 10,000 Famous Freemasons by William R. Denslow lists Mazzini as a Mason and even a Past Grand Master of the Grand Orient of Italy, articles on the Grand Orient of Italy's own website question whether he was ever a regular Mason and do not list him as a Past Grand Master.

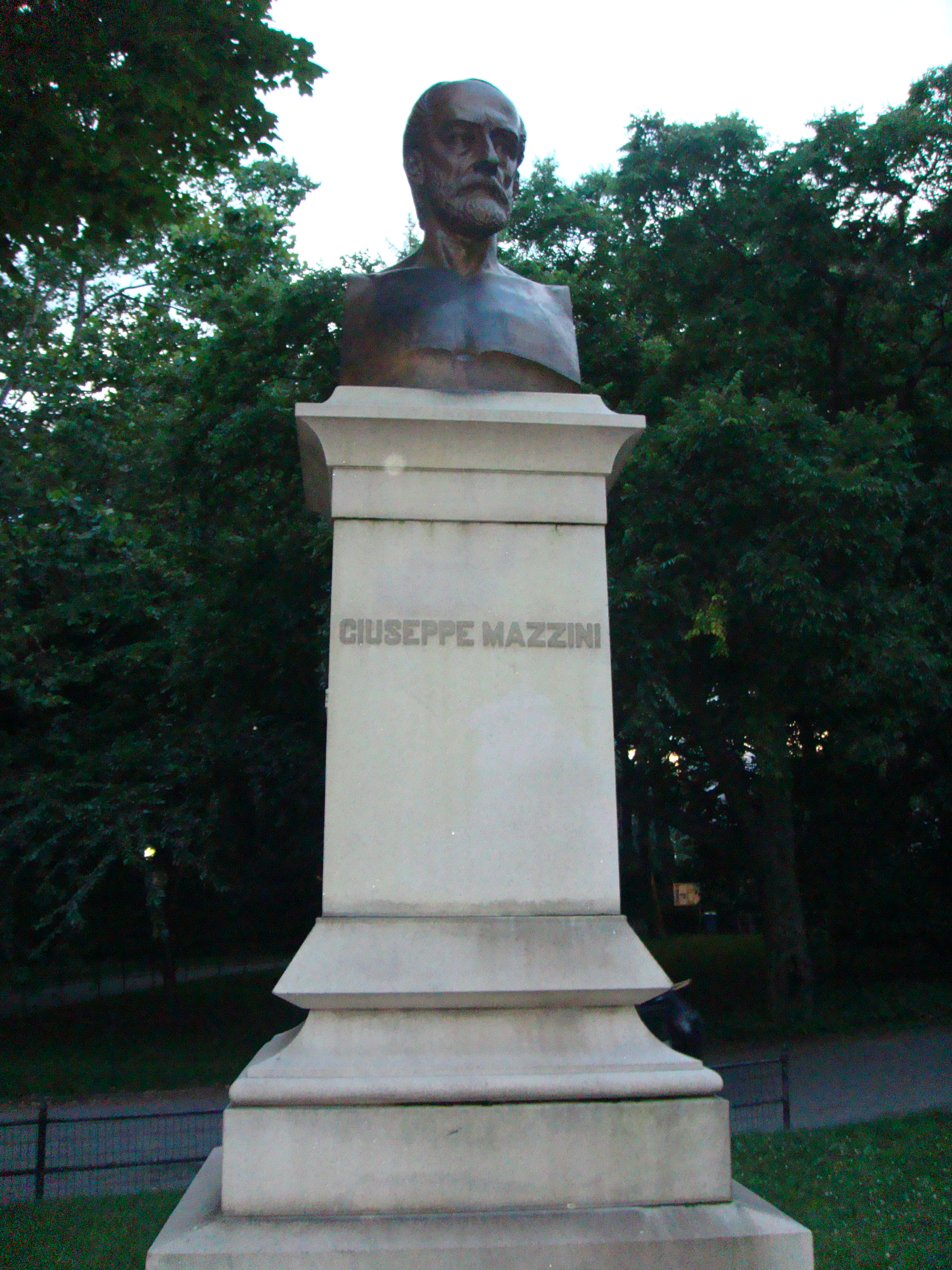
Bust of Mazzini by Giovanni Turini in Central Park

The antifascist Mazzini Society, founded in the United States in 1939 by Italian political refugees, took his name and served Italy from exile, as he had.

In London, Mazzini resided at 155 North Gower Street, near Euston Square, which is now marked with a commemorative blue plaque. A plaque on Laystall Street in Clerkenwell, London's Little Italy during the 1850s, also pays tribute to Mazzini, calling him "The Apostle of Modern Democracy". Mazzini was an important influence on British idealists such as Thomas Hill Green, and other important figures at the University of Oxford (e.g., Benjamin Jowett and Algernon Swinburne) and the University of Cambridge (e.g., Henry Sidgwick). A bust of Mazzini is in New York's Central Park between 67th and 68th streets just west of the West Drive. The 1973–1974 academic year at the College of Europe was named in his honour.

== Works ==
- Warfare Against (1825)
- On Nationality (1852)
- The Duties of Man and Other Essays (1860). The Duties of Man and Other Essays. London: J. M. Dent & Sons. 1907 – via Internet Archive. ISBN 1596052198.
- A Cosmopolitanism of Nations: Giuseppe Mazzini's Writings on Democracy, Nation Building, and International Relations Recchia, Stefano, and Urbinati, Nadia, editors. Princeton University Press, 2009.

=== Articles ===
- "Is it Revolt or a Revolution?" in Tait's Edinburgh Magazine, June 1840, pp. 385–390

== See also ==
- Italian nationalism
- Italian unification
- Jessie White Mario
- Giuseppe Garibaldi
- Liberalism and radicalism in Italy
- Revolutions of 1848 in the Italian states
- Roman Republic (1849–1850)
