= Charles Oudinot =

French general (1791–1863)

Charles Oudinot Duke of Reggio
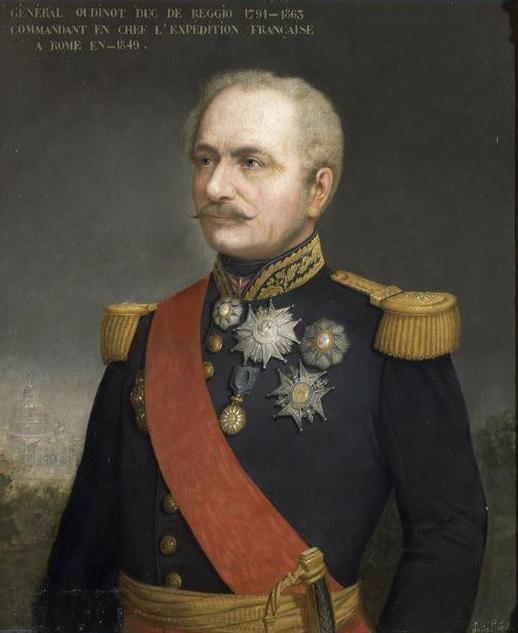
- Painting of Oudinot, 1853

Personal details
- Born: Charles Nicolas Victor Oudinot; 3 November 1791 Bar-le-Duc, Kingdom of France
- Died: 7 June 1863 (aged 71) Bar-le-Duc, French Empire
- Parent: Nicolas Oudinot (father)

Military service
- Allegiance: France
- Years of service: 1814–1860
- Rank: Lieutenant general
- Battles/wars: Napoleonic Wars

Lieutenant-General Charles Nicolas Victor Oudinot, 2nd Duc de Reggio (English: /uːdiːˈnoʊ/ oo-dee-NOH, French: [ʃaʁl nikɔla viktɔʁ udino]; 3 November 1791 – 7 June 1863) was a French military officer and eldest son of Napoleon I's marshal Nicolas Oudinot.

== Early life ==
Oudinot was born on 3 November 1791 in Bar-le-Duc to Nicholas Oudinot and Charlotte Derlin.

== Career ==
He served through the later campaigns of Napoleon, 1809–1814, and was promoted to major in 1814 for gallant conduct. Unlike his father he was a cavalryman, and after retirement during the early years of the Restoration held command of the cavalry school at Saumur (1822–1830) and was inspector-general of cavalry (1836–1848).

Oudinot is chiefly known as the commander of the French expedition that besieged and took Rome in 1849, crushing the short-lived revolutionary Roman Republic and re-establishing the temporal power of Pope Pius IX, under the protection of French arms. His brief published account presents the French view of the events. After Louis Napoleon's coup d'état of 2 December 1851, when he took a prominent part in the resistance in favour of the Second Republic, he retired from military and political life, though remaining in Paris.

Beside the brief memoir of his Italian operations in 1849, he wrote several works of more specialized interest, on military ranks and orders, the use of soldiers in constructing public works and cavalry and its proper housing: Aperçu historique sur la dignité de marechal de France (1833); Considérations sur les ordres militaires de Saint Louis, &c. (1833); "De L'Italie et de ses Forces Militaires" (1835); L'Emploi des troupes aux grands travaux d'utilité publique (1839); De la Cavalerie et du casernement des troupes à cheval (1840); Des Remontes de l'armée (1840).

== Death and legacy ==
He died on 7 June 1863 in Bar-le-Duc.

In the Luigi Magni's film In the Name of the Sovereign People (1990), Oudinot is played by Gianni Garko.
