= Carlo Armellini =

Politician and member of the Roman Republic triumvirate

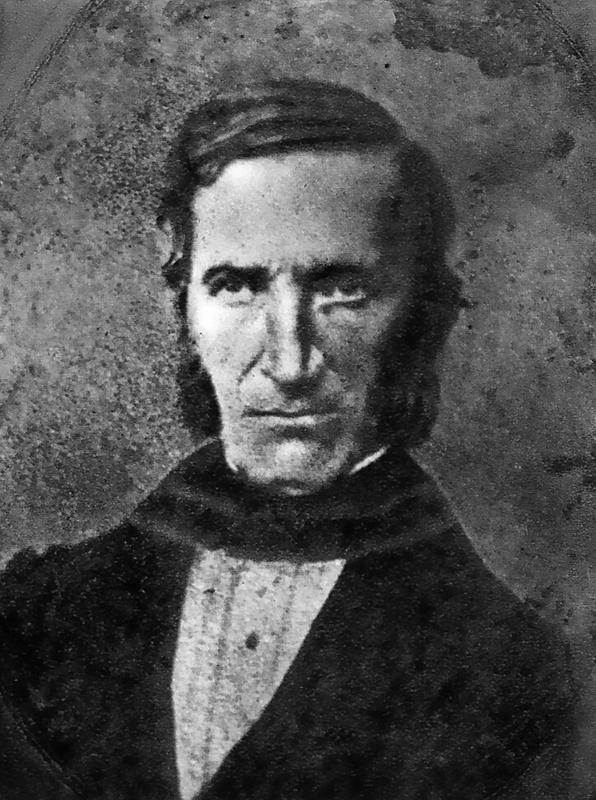

Triumvir of the Roman Republic
- In office 29 March 1849 – 1 July 1849 Serving with Giuseppe Mazzini, Aurelio Saffi
- Preceded by: Office established
- Succeeded by: Office abolished

Personal details
- Born: 1777; Rome, Papal States
- Died: 6 June 1863 (aged 86); Saint-Josse-ten-Noode, Belgium
- Profession: Politician, activist

Carlo Armellini (1777 – 6 June 1863) was a Roman politician, activist and jurist. He was part of the triumvirate leading the short-lived Roman Republic in 1849, together with Giuseppe Mazzini and Aurelio Saffi.

Armellini was born in Rome, then part of the Papal States. A moderate in politics, he followed with interest the apparently progressist moves of the first part of the pontificate of Pius IX. During Anti-Catholic protests in 1848, Armellini saved the Santo Bambino of Aracoeli from arson.

After the assassination of Pellegrino Rossi and the exile of the Pope, he became Minister of the Interior. He organized the Constituent assembly and, when the Roman Republic was declared, became (March 1849) one of three member of the leading triumvirate with Giuseppe Mazzini and Aurelio Saffi. He collaborated with Antonio Saliceti in the writing of the Constitution.

When the Republic was defeated by the French army, he went in exile to Belgium. He died there, in Saint-Josse-ten-Noode, in 1863.

Armellini was married to the pastellist Faustina Bracci Armellini.

== See also ==
- Roman Republic
- Unification of Italy
- Giuseppe Mazzini
- Pius IX

== Sources ==
- Claudio Rendina, Enciclopedia di Roma. Newton Compton, Rome. 1999.
