= Alejandro Armellini =

British academic

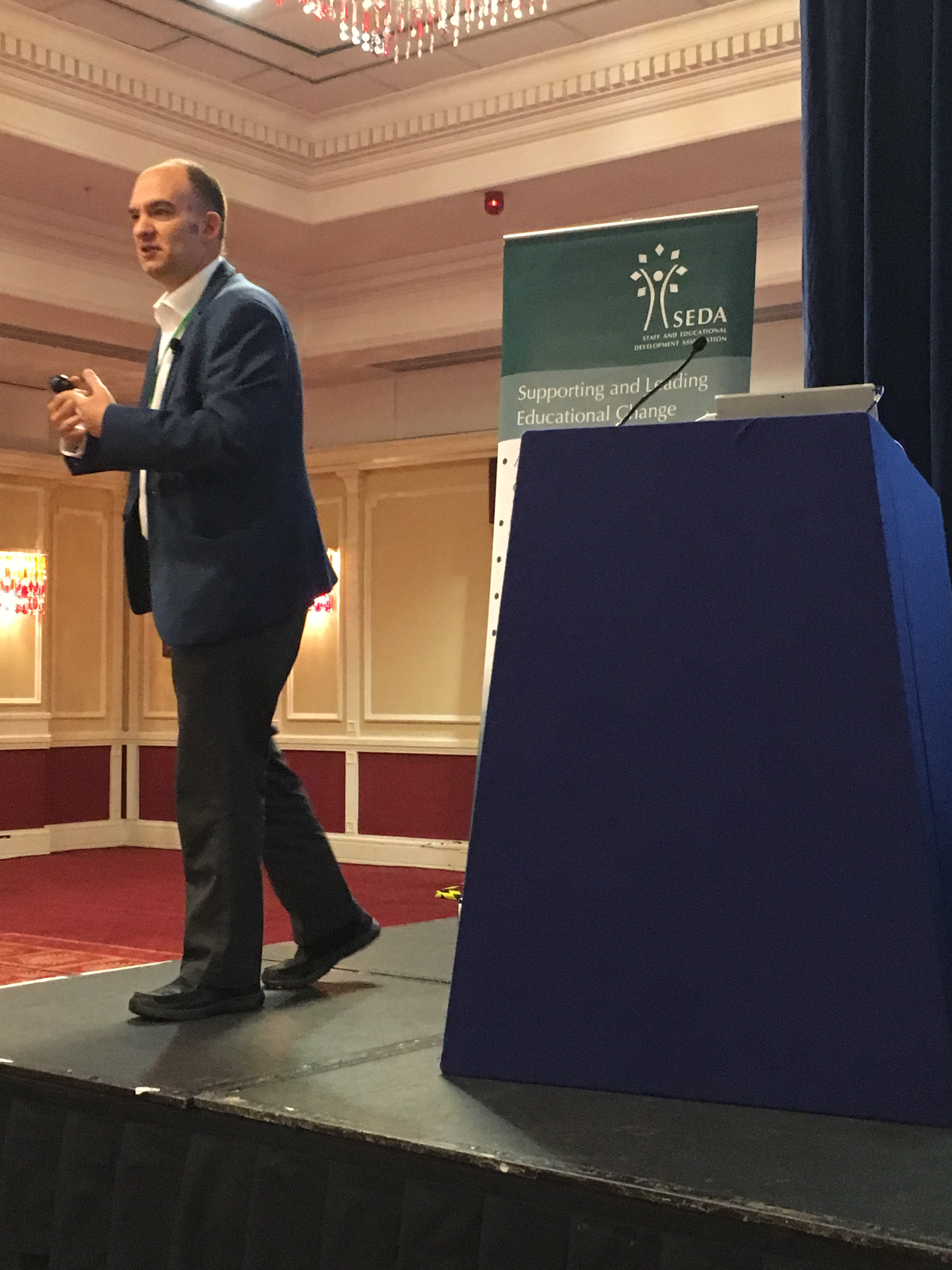
Alejandro Armellini

Alejandro Armellini (born 15 April 1966) is the Dean of Digital and Distributed Learning at the University of Portsmouth. Previously, he was the Dean of Learning and Teaching and Director of the Institute of Learning and Teaching in Higher Education at the University of Northampton, England. His research focuses on learning innovation, online and blended pedagogy, course design in online environments, institutional capacity building and open practices.

== Personal life ==
He was born in Montevideo, Uruguay and grew up in the country before pursuing his post-graduate studies in the United Kingdom. A keen tennis player, he lives in Leicestershire with his wife and two children.

== Career ==
Armellini has a master's degree in Educational Technology and TESOL (Teaching English to Speakers of Other Languages) from the University of Manchester and a PhD in Language Studies from the Canterbury Christ Church University. He has completed professional qualifications and development programmes in leadership, management and mentoring.

Prior to his position as Dean at the University of Northampton, Armellini worked as a Senior Learning Designer at the Beyond Distance Research Alliance, later the Institute of Learning Innovation, at the University of Leicester. He is known for using, researching and refining the structured CAIeRO workshops (also known as Carpe Diem) to help academics design student-centred, highly interactive courses that make effective use of a range of learning technologies.

At the University of Northampton, Armellini led the large-scale pedagogical transformation process towards Active Blended Learning (ABL) that included conceptualization, planning and delivery of tangible and positive changes in learning and teaching.

== Other roles ==
Armellini is a Fellow of the Royal Society for the Encouragement of Arts, Manufactures and Commerce (RSA) since 2015, a Principal Fellow of the Higher Education Academy, and a National Teaching Fellow. He does consultancy work for higher education institutions globally.

== Publications ==
Armellini's publications include:

- Armellini, A. & Padilla Rodriguez, B. C. (2016). Are Massive Open Online Courses (MOOCs) pedagogically innovative? Journal of Interactive Online Learning, 14(1), 17-28.
- Armellini, A., & De Stefani, M. (2016). Social presence in the 21st Century: an adjustment to the Community of Inquiry framework. British Journal of Educational Technology, 47(6), 1202-1216.
- Alden Rivers, B., Armellini, A., & Nie, M. (2015) Embedding social innovation and social impact across the disciplines: identifying "Changemaker" attributes. Higher Education Skills and Work-Based Learning, 5(3), pp. 242–257.
- Armellini, A., & Nie, M. (2013). Open educational practices for curriculum enhancement. Open Learning, 28(1), 7-20.
- Nikoi, S. & Armellini, A. (2012). The OER mix in higher education: purpose, process, product, and policy. Distance Education, 33(2), 165-184.
- Armellini, A., & Aiyegbayo, O. (2010). Learning design and assessment with e-tivities. British Journal of Educational Technology, 41(6), 922-935.
- Salmon, G., Jones, S., & Armellini, A. (2008). Building institutional capability in e-learning design. ALT-J: Research in Learning Technology. 16(2), 95-109.
