= Faustina Bracci Armellini =

Italian painter

Faustina Bracci Armellini (1785–1857) was an Italian pastellist.

Born in Rome, Bracci Armellini was the daughter of Virginio Bracci, an architect, and granddaughter of the sculptor Pietro Bracci. In 1811 she became a member of the Accademia di San Luca, which preserves a self-portrait, dating to that year, in which she is seen copying a portrait of Antonio Canova by Sir Thomas Lawrence. In 1812 she married Carlo Armellini. All of her known works date to after 1800.
