= Young Italy =

1831–1848 Italian pro-unification political movement

Young Italy La Giovine Italia
- President: Giuseppe Mazzini
- Founded: July 1831
- Dissolved: 5 May 1848
- Succeeded by: Italian National Association
- Ideology: Italian nationalism Republicanism
- Political position: Left-wing
- International affiliation: Young Europe
- Slogan: Unione, forza e libertà (Union, Strength and Liberty)

Young Italy (Italian: La Giovine Italia, pronounced [la ˈdʒoːvine iˈtaːlja]) was an Italian political movement founded in 1831 by Giuseppe Mazzini. A few months after leaving Italy, in June 1831, Mazzini wrote a letter to King Charles Albert of Sardinia, in which he asked him to unite Italy and lead the nation. A month later, convinced that his demands did not reach the king, he founded the movement in Marseille. It would then spread out to other nations across Europe. The movement's goal was to create a united Italian republic through promoting a general insurrection in the Italian reactionary states and in the lands occupied by the Austrian Empire. Mazzini's belief was that a popular uprising would create a unified Italy. The slogan that defined the movement's aim was "Union, Strength, and Liberty". The phrase could be found in the tricolor Italian flag, which represented the country's unity.

== Overview ==
The Giovine Italia was founded in France, in July 1831 when Mazzini was in exile. Its members adopted nicknames taken from figures of the Italian Middle Ages. Every member of the brotherhood had to recite an Oath, where they would pledge to make Italy a united, free, independent, republican nation, and where every man would be considered equal. The movement garnered about 60,000 members around 1833. In that same year, many of the members who were plotting a revolt in Savoy and Piedmont were arrested and executed by the Sardinian police. In Austria, having links with the movement was seen as treason. The crime was punishable by death.

After another failed Mazzinian revolt in Piedmont and Savoy of the February 1834, the movement disappeared for some time, reappearing in 1838 in England. Further insurrections in Sicily, Abruzzi, Tuscany, Lombardy-Venetia, Romagna (1841 and 1845), and Bologna (1843) failed. Also short-lived was the Roman Republic of 1848–49, which was crushed by a French Army called in to help by Pope Pius IX. That Pope was initially hailed by Mazzini as the most likely paladin of a liberal unification of Italy, but he turned into the leader of the reactionaries.

Similar movements were set up around Europe by Mazzini himself. La Giovine Italia became affiliated with the movement Giovine Europa (created in 1835), an internationally oriented association, together with similar movements such as Junges Deutschland, Młoda Polska, Young Turks and Giovine Svizzera. It also inspired Mlada Bosna, early-20th-century Serbian revolutionary movement in occupied Bosnia and Herzegovina.

Mazzini's movement was basically evicted after a last failed revolt against Austria in Milan in 1853, crushing hopes of a democratic Italy in favor of the Piedmontese monarchy. It achieved national unification in 1860 under the leadership of Count Cavour.

The most famous member of Young Italy was Giuseppe Garibaldi (1807–1882). He joined the movement around 1833, after meeting Mazzini through social and political reforms back in Geneva. Additionally, he was part of a failed revolt led by Mazzini in Piedmont. As a consequence, he was sentenced to death. After learning his fate, Garibaldi fled to Marseille.

Later on, similar nationalist movements for youth appeared in Europe's colonies in various Asian and African countries from the mid 19th century to the period of decolonization in the late 20th century.

== See also ==
- Carbonari
- Unification of Italy
- Vincenzo Gioberti
- Giuseppe Garibaldi
- Attilio and Emilio Bandiera
- Carlo Pisacane
- Francesco Bentivegna
- Raffaello Carboni
- Young America Movement
- Young Turks
- Abhinav Bharat Society
