= Roman Republic (1849–1850) =

Two-month republican government in the Papal States

Roman Republic Repubblica Romana (Italian)
- 1849
- State and civil flag Coat of arms
- Motto: Dio e Popolo God and People
- Anthem: Il Canto degli Italiani (Italian) "The Song of the Italians"
- Status: Unrecognized state
- Capital: Rome
- Official languages: Italian; French
- Recognised regional languages: German
- Common languages: Italian
- Religion: Roman Catholicism
- Government: Republic
- Triumvirate
  - 1849: Giuseppe Mazzini; Carlo Armellini; Aurelio Saffi
- History
  - Election: 21 January 1849
  - Established: 9 February 1849
  - Invasion: 25 April 1849
  - Fall of Rome: 2 July 1849
  - Disestablished: 2 July
- Currency: Roman scudo
Preceded by	Succeeded by
Papal States	Papal States; Kingdom of Italy
- Today part of: Italy; Vatican City

The Roman Republic (Italian: Repubblica Romana) was a short-lived state declared on 9 February 1849, when the government of the Papal States was temporarily replaced by a republican government due to Pope Pius IX's departure to Gaeta. The republic was led by Carlo Armellini, Giuseppe Mazzini, and Aurelio Saffi. Together they formed a triumvirate, a reflection of a form of government during the first century BC crisis of the Roman Republic.

One of the major innovations the Republic hoped to achieve was enshrined in its constitution: freedom of religion, with the pope and his successors guaranteed the right to govern the Catholic Church. These religious freedoms were quite different from the situation under the preceding government, which allowed only Catholicism and Judaism to be practised by its citizens. The Constitution of the Roman Republic was the first in the world to abolish capital punishment in its constitutional law.

== History ==
=== Assassination of Pellegrino Rossi ===
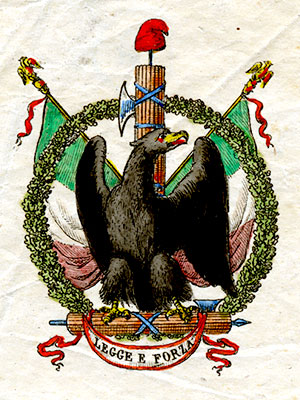
One of the emblems of the Roman Republic.

On 15 November 1848, Pellegrino Rossi, the Minister of Justice of the Papal government and a moderate liberal, was assassinated. The following day, the liberals of Rome filled the streets, where various groups demanded a democratic government, social reforms and a declaration of war against the Austrian Empire to liberate long-held territories that were culturally and ethnically Italian. On the night of 24 November, Pope Pius IX left Rome disguised as an ordinary priest, and went out of the state to Gaeta, a fortress in the Kingdom of the Two Sicilies. Before leaving, he had allowed the formation of a government led by Archbishop Carlo Emanuele Muzzarelli, to whom he wrote a note before leaving:

We entrust to your known prudence and honesty to inform the minister Galletti, engaging him with all the other ministers not only to defend the palaces, but especially the persons near you that did not know Our decision. Because not only you and your family are dear to Our heart, We repeat they did not know Our thinking, but much more We recommend to those Sirs tranquillity and order of the whole City.

The government issued some liberal reforms which Pius IX rejected. When securely established in Gaeta, he organised a new government. A delegation was created by the High Council established by the Pope and the mayor of Rome, and sent to reassure the Pope and ask him to come back as soon as possible. This delegation was composed of the mayor himself, Prince Tommaso Corsini, three priests – Rezzi, Mertel and Arrighi – Marchese Paolucci de Calboli, doctor Fusconi and lawyer Rossi. However, they were stopped at the state boundary at Terracina. The Pope, informed of this, refused to speak to them. In Rome a Costituente Romana was formed on 29 November.

=== Elections ===
Without a local government in Rome, for the first time in recent history, popular assemblies gathered. Margaret Fuller described the procession under a new flag, a tricolore sent from Venice, that set the flag in the hands of the equestrian statue of Marcus Aurelius at the Campidoglio, and the angry popular reaction to papal warnings of excommunication for political actions of November received from Gaeta and posted on the 3rd. The Costituenti decided to schedule direct and universal elections (electors were all the citizens of the State, male and over 21 years old) on the following 21 January 1849. Since the pope had forbidden Catholics to vote at those elections (he considered the convocation of the election "a monstrous act of felony made without a mask by the sponsors of the anarchic demagogy", an "abnormal and sacrilegious attempt... deserving the punishments written both in the divine and the human laws"), the resulting constitutional assembly (informally known as "The Assembly of the Damned") had a republican inclination. In each and every part of the Papal States, less than 50% of the potential voters went to the polls.

The voters were not asked to express themselves on the parties but to vote for individuals. The lawyer Francesco Sturbinetti, who had led the Council of the Deputies, received the most votes, followed by Carlo Armellini, the physician Pietro Sterbini, Monsignor Carlo Emanuele Muzzarelli (in whose hands Pius had left the city), and Carlo Luciano Bonaparte, Prince of Canino. The aristocracy was represented by a prince, six marquises, fifteen counts and three other nobles. The new assembly was dominated by the bourgeoisie, the affluent, professionals and employees. It included twenty-seven owners, a banker, fifty-three jurists and lawyers, six graduates, twelve professors, two writers, twenty-one doctors, one pharmacist, six engineers, five employees, two merchants, nineteen military officers, one prior and one monsignore.

On 2 February 1849, at a political rally held in the Teatro Apollo, a young Roman ex-priest, the Abbé Arduini, made a speech in which he declared that the temporal power of the popes was a "historical lie, a political imposture, and a religious immorality."

=== Proclamation of the Roman Republic ===
The Constitutional Assembly convened on 8 February and proclaimed the Roman Republic after midnight on 9 February. According to Jasper Ridley: "When the name of Carlo Luciano Bonaparte, who was a member for Viterbo, was called, he replied to the roll-call by calling out Long live the Republic!" (Viva la Repubblica!). That a Roman Republic was a foretaste of wider expectations was expressed in the acclamation of Giuseppe Mazzini as a Roman citizen.

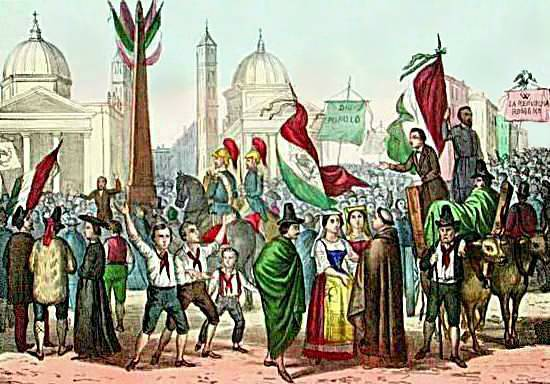
Proclamation of the Roman Republic in 1849, in Piazza del Popolo

When news reached the city of the decisive defeat of Piedmontese forces at the Battle of Novara (22 March), the Assembly proclaimed the Triumvirate, of Carlo Armellini (Roman), Giuseppe Mazzini (Roman) and Aurelio Saffi (from Teramo, Papal States), and a government, led by Muzzarelli and composed also by Aurelio Saffi (from Forlì, Papal States). Among the first acts of the Republic was the proclamation of the right of the Pope to continue his role as head of the Roman Church. The Triumvirate passed popular legislation to eliminate burdensome taxes and to give work to the unemployed.

Giuseppe Garibaldi formed the "Italian Legion", with many recruits coming from Piedmont and the Austrian territories of Lombardy and Venetia, and took up a station at the border town of Rieti on the border with the Kingdom of Two Sicilies. There the legion rose to about 1,000 and gained discipline and organization.

=== Foreign intervention ===
The Pope asked for military help from Catholic countries. Saliceti and Montecchi left the Triumvirate; their places were filled on 29 March by Saffi and Giuseppe Mazzini, the Genoese founder of the journal La Giovine Italia, who had been the guiding spirit of the Republic from the start. Mazzini won friends among the poor by confiscating some of the Church's large landholdings and distributing them to peasants. He inaugurated prison and insane asylum reforms, freedom of the press, and secular education, but shied away from the "Right to Work" or work guarantee programs for unemployed poor, having seen the compromise National Workshops measure of Louis Blanc fail in France shortly before.

However, the government's policies (lower taxes, increased spending) were fiscally expansionary and involved a decrease in the value of the currency.

Piedmont was at risk of attack by Austrian forces, and the Republic's movement of troops in the area was a threat to Austria (which was certainly capable of attacking Rome itself). The commander-in-chief of Austrian forces in Milan, Count Joseph Radetzky von Radetz, had remarked during the "Five Glorious Days" of Milan, "Three days of blood will give us thirty years of peace".

But the Roman Republic would fall to another, unexpected enemy. In France, newly elected President Louis Napoleon, who would soon declare himself emperor Napoleon III, was torn. He himself had participated in an insurrection in the Papal States against the Pope in 1831, but at this point, he was under intense pressure from ultramontane French Catholics, who had voted overwhelmingly for him. Additionally, an intervention into Rome would expand French influence in Italy while weakening Habsburg influence, both being foreign policy goals of Louis Napoleon. Thus, though he hesitated to betray Italian liberals, Louis Napoleon ultimately decided to send French troops to restore the Pope.

=== French siege ===
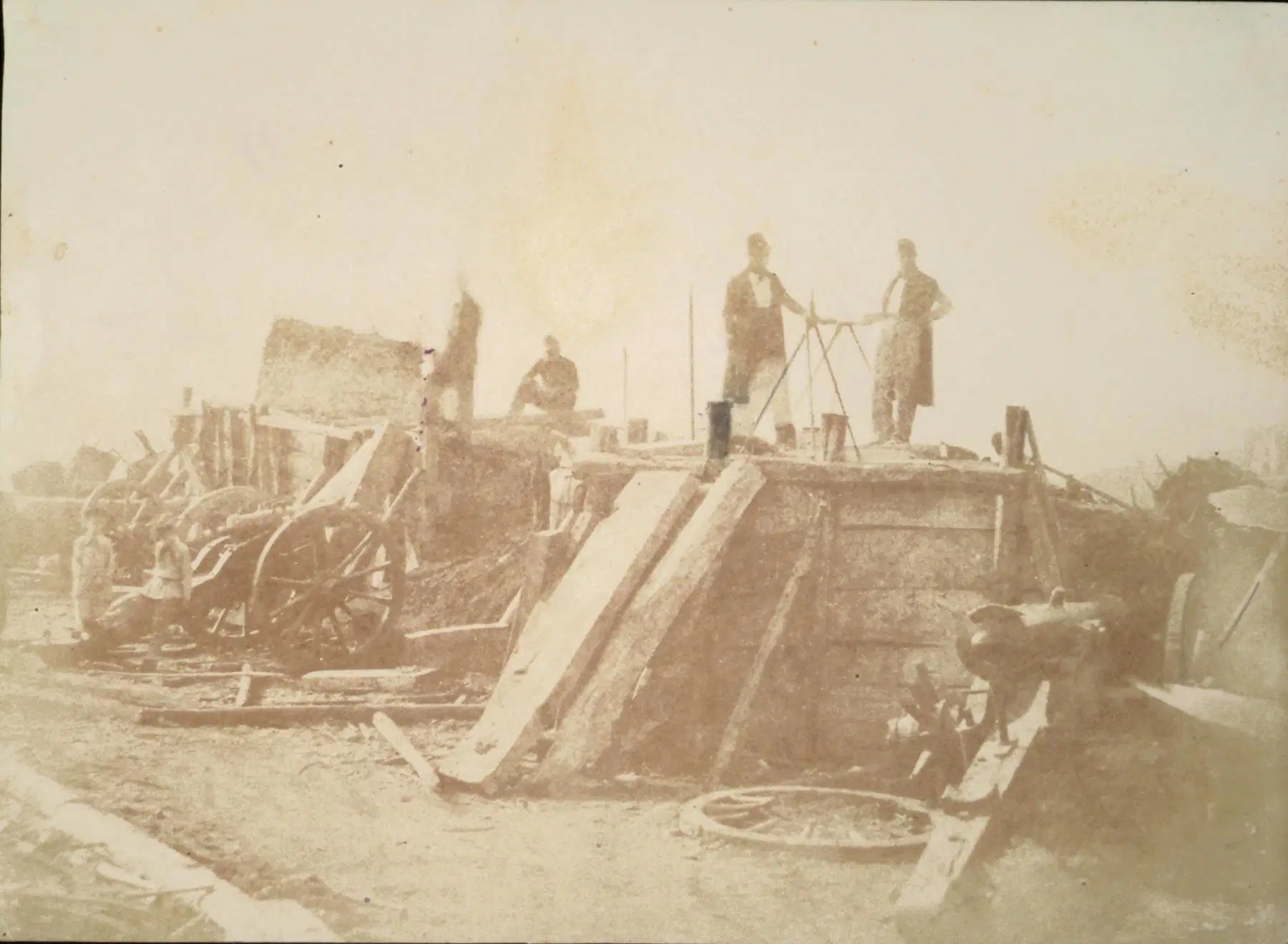
Artillery battery and earthworks at the Aurelian Walls during the defense of Rome in 1849

On 25 April, 1849, some eight to ten thousand French troops under General Charles Oudinot landed at Civitavecchia on the coast northwest of Rome, while Spain sent 4,000 men under Fernando Fernández de Córdova to Gaeta, where the Pope remained in his refuge. The French sent a staff officer the next day to meet with Giuseppe Mazzini with a stiff assertion that the pope would be restored to power. The revolutionary Roman Assembly, amid thunderous shouts of "Guerra!, Guerra!", authorised Mazzini to resist the French by force of arms.

The French expected little resistance from the usurpers. But republican resolve was stiffened by the charismatic Giuseppe Garibaldi's long-delayed triumphal entry into Rome at last, on 27 April, and by the arrival on 29 April of the Lombard Bersaglieri, who had recently driven the Austrians from the streets of Milan with new tactics of house-to-house fighting. Hasty defences were erected on the Janiculum wall, and the villas on the city's outskirts were garrisoned. On 30 April, Oudinot's out-of-date maps led him to march to a gate that had been walled up sometime before. The first cannon shot was mistaken for the noon-day gun, and the astonished French were beaten back by the fiercely anti-clerical Romans of Trastevere, Garibaldi's legionaries and citizen-soldiers, who sent them back to the sea. But despite Garibaldi's urging, Mazzini was loath to follow up their advantage, as he had not expected an attack by the French and hoped that the Roman Republic could befriend the French Republic. The French prisoners were treated as ospiti della guerra ("guests of war") and sent back with republican tracts citing Article V of the most recent French constitution: "France respects foreign nationalities. Her might will never be employed against the liberty of any people".

As a result, Oudinot was able to regroup and await reinforcements; time proved to be on his side, and Mazzini's attempt at diplomacy proved fatal to the Roman Republic. A letter from Louis Napoleon encouraged Oudinot and assured him of French reinforcements. The French government sent Ferdinand de Lesseps to negotiate a more formal ceasefire. Neapolitan troops sympathetic to the papacy entered Roman Republic territory, and de Lesseps suggested that Oudinot's forces in their current position might protect the city from the converging approach of an Austrian army with the Neapolitan force: the Roman Triumvirate agreed. Many Italians from outside the Papal States went to Rome to fight for the Republic: among them was Goffredo Mameli, who had tried to form a common state joining the Roman Republic and Tuscany, and who died of a wound suffered in the defence of Rome.

The siege began in earnest on 1 June, and despite the resistance of the Republican army, led by Garibaldi, the French prevailed on 29 June. On 30 June the Roman Assembly met and debated three options: to surrender; to continue fighting in the streets of Rome; to retreat from Rome and continue the resistance from the Apennine Mountains. Garibaldi made a speech in which he favoured the third option and then said: Dovunque saremo, colà sarà Roma. ("Wherever we may be, there will be Rome!").

A truce was negotiated on 1 July and on 2 July Garibaldi, followed by some 4,000 troops, withdrew from Rome for refuge in the neutral Republic of San Marino. The French Army entered Rome on 3 July and reestablished the Holy See's temporal power. In August Louis Napoleon issued a sort of manifesto in which he asked of Pius IX a general amnesty, a secularized administration, the establishment of the Code Napoléon, and in general a Liberal Government. Pius, from Gaeta, promised reforms that he declared motu proprio, that is, of his own volition, not in answer to the French.

The pope did not return to Rome itself until April 1850, since the French were considered liberals all the same, and the pope would not return until assured of no French meddling in his affairs. In the interim, Rome was governed by a "Red Triumvirate" of cardinals. French soldiers propped up the papal administration in Rome until they were withdrawn at the outbreak of the Franco-Prussian War in 1870, leading to the subsequent capture of Rome and annexation by the Kingdom of Italy.

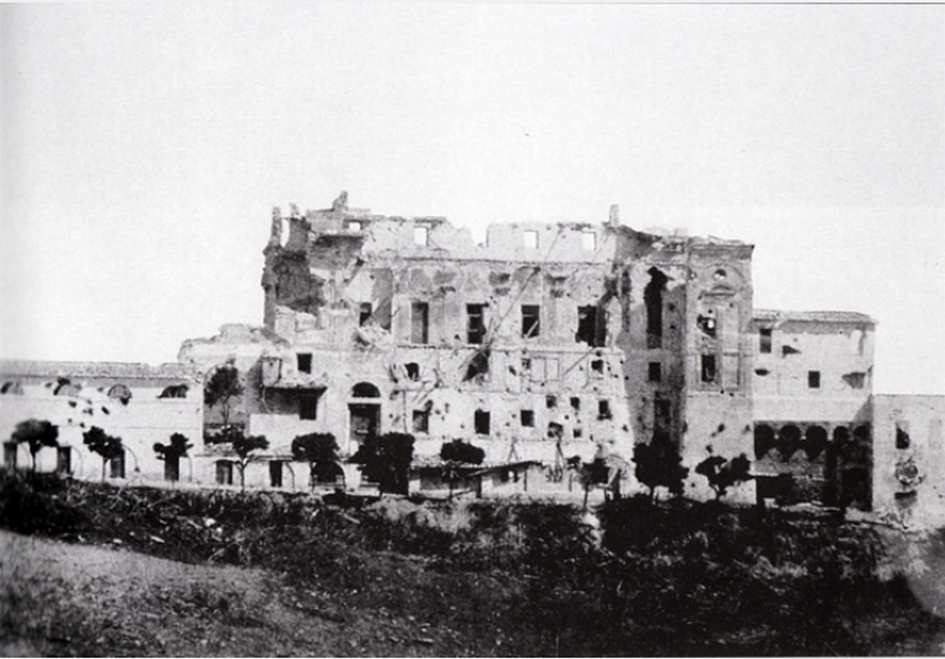
Casino Savorelli after the French bombardments of Rome in 1849

According to Raffaele De Cesare:

The Roman question was the stone tied to Napoleon's feet – that dragged him into the abyss. He never forgot, even in August 1870, a month before Sedan, that he was a sovereign of a Catholic country, that he had been made emperor, and was supported by the votes of the conservatives and the influence of the clergy; and that it was his supreme duty not to abandon the pontiff. […] For twenty years Napoleon III had been the true sovereign of Rome, where he had many friends and relations […] Without him the temporal power would never have been reconstituted, nor, being reconstituted, would have endured."

== See also ==
- Naval operations of the First Italian War of Independence
- Revolutions of 1848
- Revolutions of 1848 in the Italian states
- Tuscan Republic (1849)
- Republic of San Marco
- Luigi Magni's film In the Name of the Sovereign People (1990)
- Paris Commune
