= Carlo Simi =

Italian architect and designer

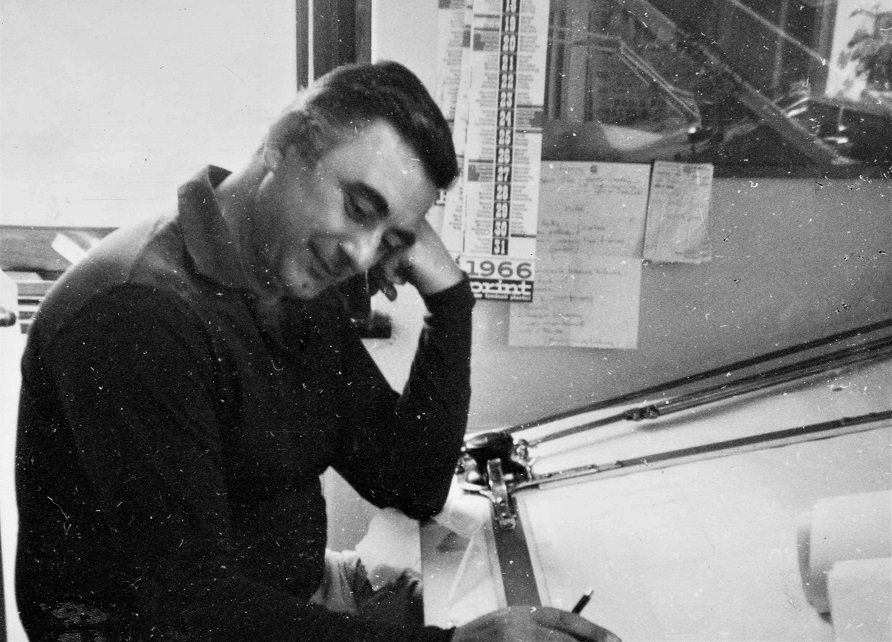
- Carlo Simi in 1966
- Born: 7 November 1924; Viareggio, Tuscany
- Died: 26 November 2000 (aged 76); Roma, Italy
- Occupations: Architect, production designer and costume designer
- Awards: Nastro d'argento alla migliore scenografia (1985); David di Donatello for Best Production Design (1992)

Carlo Simi (7 November 1924 – 26 November 2000) was an Italian architect, production designer and costume designer, who worked frequently with Sergio Leone and Sergio Corbucci, giving their Spaghetti Westerns a unique look. Most famous for his costume and set designs for Once Upon a Time in the West Simi also built the town of 'El Paso' in the Almería desert for Leone's second Western, For a Few Dollars More. Built around a massive bank, with vistas of the Tabernas Desert visible between buildings, the set still exists, as a tourist attraction called "Mini Hollywood". Simi played the bank manager in that film: it was his only acting role. He also designed the Sad Hill Cemetery for the last scene of The Good, the Bad and the Ugly.

Simi died in Rome on 26 November 2000 at the age of 76.

Some of his costumes and set designs were exhibited at the Autry National Center's Museum of the American West in Los Angeles in 2005. In 2018 he posthumously received the 'Leone in Memoriam' award by the Almería Western Film Festival for the 50 anniversary of Once Upon a Time in the West. A museum in Covarrubias, Burgos will be named after him.

== Filmography ==
=== As actor ===
- For a Few Dollars More (1965) – El Paso Bank Manager (uncredited)

=== As costume designer ===
- Two Gangsters in the Wild West (1964)
- Bullets Don't Argue (1964)
- Minnesota Clay (1964)
- One Hundred Thousand Dollars for Lassiter (1966)
- Django (1966)
- Ringo and His Golden Pistol (1966)
- Texas, Adios (1966)
- The Big Gundown (1966)
- The Good, the Bad and the Ugly (1966)
- Face to Face (1967)
- Day of Anger (1967)
- Once Upon a Time in the West (1968)
- Sabata (1969)
- Revolver (1973)
- Carambola's Philosophy: In the Right Pocket (1975)
- Keoma (1976)
- California (1977 film) (1977)
- Silver Saddle (1978)
- Fun is Beautiful (1980)

=== As production designer ===
- The Shortest Day (1963)
- Per il gusto di uccidere (1966)
- A Genius, Two Partners and a Dupe (1975)
- Bianco, rosso e Verdone (1981)
- Once Upon a Time in America (1984)
- They Call Me Renegade (1987)
- Where the Night Begins (1991)
