= David di Donatello for Best Production Design =

Annual Italian film award

The David di Donatello for Best Production Design (Italian: David di Donatello per la migliore scenografia), known as the David di Donatello per il miglior scenografo prior to 2018, is a film award presented annually by the Accademia del Cinema Italiano (ACI, Academy of Italian Cinema) to recognize outstanding efforts on the part of film production designers who have worked within the Italian film industry during the year preceding the ceremony. It was first presented during the 1981 edition of the David di Donatello award show. Since 2021, the award is shared with the set decorators.

== Winners and nominees ==
Winners are indicated in bold.

=== 1980s ===
1981

- **Mario Garbuglia** – The Lady of the Camellias
- Andrea Crisanti – Three Brothers
- Luigi Scaccianoce – Fontamara

1982

- **Lorenzo Baraldi** – Il marchese del Grillo
- Andrea Crisanti – Talcum Powder
- Dante Ferretti – Tales of Ordinary Madness
- Lorenzo Baraldi – Portrait of a Woman, Nude

1983

- **Dante Ferretti** – That Night in Varennes
- Marco Ferreri – The Story of Piera
- Gianni Sbarra – The Night of the Shooting Stars

1984

- **Dante Ferretti** – And the Ship Sails On
- Luciano Ricceri – Le Bal
- Elena Ricci Poccetto – Where's Picone?

1985

- **Enrico Job** – Carmen
- Francesco Bronzi – Kaos
- Enrico Fiorentini – A Proper Scandal

1986

- **Enrico Job** – Camorra
- Dante Ferretti – Ginger and Fred
- Luciano Ricceri – Macaroni

1987

- **Dante Ferretti** – The Name of the Rose
- Mario Chiari – Via Montenapoleone
- Luciano Ricceri – The Family

1988

- **Bruno Cesari**, **Osvaldo Desideri**, and **Ferdinando Scarfiotti** – The Last Emperor
- Danilo Donati – Intervista
- Mario Garbuglia – Dark Eyes

1989

- **Danilo Donati** – Francesco
- Lucia Mirisola – 'O Re
- Ferdinando Scarfiotti – Fair Game

=== 1990s ===
1990

- **Dante Ferretti** – The Voice of the Moon
- Giantito Burchiellaro – The Bachelor
- Amedeo Fago and Franco Velchi – Open Doors
- Mario Garbuglia – The Miser
- Franco Velchi – Dark Illness

1991

- **Paolo Biagetti** and **Luciano Ricceri** – Captain Fracassa's Journey
- Gianni Sbarra – The Sun Also Shines at Night
- Andrea Crisanti – Everybody's Fine
- Lucia Mirisola and Paola Comencini – In the Name of the Sovereign People

1992

- **Carlo Simi** – Bix
- Andrea Crisanti – The Stolen Children
- Ezio Frigerio – The Inner Circle

1993

- **Gianna Sbarra** – Fiorile
- Giancarlo Muselli – Death of a Neapolitan Mathematician
- Carlo Simi – The Valley of Stone

1994

- **Antonello Geleng** – Cemetery Man
- Giantito Burchiellaro – Sparrow
- Enrico Fiorentini – For Love, Only for Love

1995

- **Andrea Crisanti** – A Pure Formality
- Giantito Burchiellaro – Sostiene Pereira
- Gianni Quaranta – Farinelli

1996

- **Francesco Bronzi** – The Star Maker
- Enrico Job – The Nymph
- Gianni Silvestri – Stealing Beauty

1997

- **Danilo Donati** – Marianna Ucrìa
- Giancarlo Basili – Nirvana
- Giantito Burchiellaro – The Prince of Homburg
- Andrea Crisanti – The Truce
- Gianni Sbarra – The Elective Affinities

1998

- **Danilo Donati** – Life Is Beautiful
- Alberto Cottignoli and Stefano Tonelli – The Best Man
- Luciano Ricceri – Kaputt Mundi

1999

- **Francesco Frigeri** – The Legend of 1900
- Giancarlo Basili – The Way We Laughed
- Enrico Job – Ferdinando and Carolina

=== 2000s ===
2000

- **Francesco Bronzi** – Canone inverso
- Marco Dentici – The Nanny
- Antonello Geleng and Marina Pinzuti – Love in the Mirror (Amor nello specchio)

2001

- **Luciano Ricceri** – Unfair Competition
- Giancarlo Basili – The Son's Room
- Francesco Frigeri – Malèna

2002

- **Luigi Marchione** – The Prefession of Arms
- Giancarlo Basili – Paz!
- Francesco Frigeri – Vajont

2003

- **Danilo Donati** – Pinocchio
- Paolo Bonfini – The Embalmer
- Giantito Burchiellaro – The Soul Keeper
- Marco Dentici – My Mother's Smile
- Simona Migliotti – Incantato

2004

- **Luigi Marchione** – Singing Behind Screens
- Paola Bizzarri – Agata and the Storm
- Franco Ceraolo – The Best of Youth
- Marco Dentici – What Will Happen to Us
- Francesco Frigeri – Don't Move

2005

- **Andrea Crisanti** – Sacred Heart
- Giancarlo Basili – An Italian Romance
- Francesca Bocca – After Midnight
- Marco Dentici – The Life That I Want
- Beatrice Scarpato – The Remains of Nothing

2006

- **Paola Comencini** – Romanzo Criminale
- Giancarlo Basili – The Caiman
- Andrea Crisanti – The Goodbye Kiss
- Carlo De Marino – Fuoco su di me
- Maurizio Marchitelli – My Best Enemy

2007

- **Carlos Conti** – Nuovomondo
- Francesco Frigeri – Napoleon and Me
- Tonino Zera – The Unknown Woman
- Giuseppe Pirrotta – One Hundred Nails
- Andrea Crisanti – The Lark Farm

2008

- **Francesco Frigeri** – I Viceré
- Paola Bizzarri – Days and Clouds
- Giada Calabria – Quiet Chaos
- Alessandra Mura – The Girl by the Lake
- Tonino Zera – Hotel Meina

2009

- **Francesco Frigeri** – The Demons of St. Petersberg
- Giancarlo Basili – Wild Blood
- Paolo Bonfini – Gomorrah
- Giantito Burchiellaro – Caravaggio
- Lino Fiorito – Il divo

=== 2010s ===
2010

- **Marco Dentici** – Vincere
- Gian Carlo Basili – The Man Who Will Come
- Andrea Crisanti – Loose Cannons
- Maurizio Sabatini – Baarìa
- Tonino Zera – The First Beautiful Thing

2011

- **Emita Frigato** – Noi credevamo
- Francesco Frigeri - Amici miei – Come tutto ebbe inizio
- Paola Comencini – Benvenuti al Sud
- Paki Meduri – Into Paradiso
- Tonino Zera – Angel of Evil

2012

- **Paola Bizzarri** – We Have a Pope
- Francesco Frigeri – The Entrepreneur
- Andrea Crisanti – Magnificent Presence
- Giancarlo Basili – Piazza Fontana: The Italian Conspiracy
- Stefania Cella – This Must Be the Place

2013

- **Maurizio Sabatini** and **Raffaella Giovannetti** – The Best Offer
- Paolo Bonfini – Reality
- Marco Dentici – It Was the Son
- Marta Maffucci – Diaz – Don't Clean Up This Blood
- Rita Rabassini – Siberian Education

2014

- **Stefania Cella** – The Great Beauty
- Giancarlo Basili – Those Happy Years
- Marco Dentici – Salvo
- Marta Maffucci – Fasten Your Seatbelts
- Mauro Radaelli – Human Capital

2015

- **Giancarlo Muselli** – Leopardi
- Luca Servino – Black Souls
- Emita Frigato – Wondrous Boccaccio
- Paki Meduri – The Legendary Giulia and Other Miracles
- Giuseppe Pirrotta – Greenery Will Bloom Again

2016

- **Dimitri Capuani** and **Alessia Anfuso** – Tale of Tales
- Maurizio Sabatini – The Correspondence
- Massimiliano Sturiale – They Call Me Jeeg
- Giada Calabria – Don't Be Bad
- Paki Meduri – Suburra
- Ludovica Ferrario – Youth

2017

- **Tonino Zera** – Like Crazy
- Marcello Di Carlo – At War with Love
- Carmine Guarino – Indivisible
- Marco Dentici – Sweet Dreams
- Livia Borgognoni – La stoffa dei sogni

2018

- **Deniz Gokturk Kobanbay** and **Ivana Gargiulo** – Napoli velata
- Noemi Marchica – Love and Bullets
- Maurizio Sabatini – Brutti e cattivi
- Tonino Zera – The Girl in the Fog
- Giancarlo Basili – Tenderness
- Luca Servino – Bloody Richard

2019

- **Dimitri Capuani** – Dogman
- Giancarlo Muselli – Capri-Revolution
- Samuel Deshors – Call Me by Your Name
- Emita Frigato – Happy as Lazzaro
- Stefania Cella – Loro

=== 2020s ===
2020

- **Dimitri Capuani** – **Pinocchio**
- Nello Giorgetti – 5 Is the Perfect Number
- Tonino Zera – The First King: Birth of an Empire
- Andrea Castorina – The Traitor
- Inbal Weinberg – Suspiria

| Year | Title | Production designer(s) | Set decorator(s) |
|---|---|---|---|
| 2021 (66th) | **Hidden Away** | **Ludovica Ferrario**, **Alessandra Mura** | **Paola Zamagni** |
| 2021 (66th) | Bad Tales | Paolo Bonfini, Paola Peraro, Emita Frigato | Erika Aversa |
| 2021 (66th) | Hammamet | Giancarlo Basili | Andrea Castorina |
| 2021 (66th) | Miss Marx | Alessandro Vannucci, Igor Gabriel | Fiorella Cicolini |
| 2021 (66th) | Rose Island | Tonino Zera | Maria Grazia Schirripa |
| 2022 (67th) | **Freaks Out** | **Massimiliano Sturiale** | **Ilaria Fallacara** |
| 2022 (67th) | Diabolik | Noemi Marchica | Maria Michela De Domenico |
| 2022 (67th) | The Hand of God | Carmine Guarino | Iole Autero |
| 2022 (67th) | The Inner Cage | Luca Servino | Susanna Abenavoli |
| 2022 (67th) | The King of Laughter | Giancarlo Muselli, Carlo Rescigno | Laura Casalini, Francesco Fonda |
| 2023 (68th) | **Strangeness** | **Giada Calabria** | **Loredana Raffi** |
| 2023 (68th) | Caravaggio's Shadow | Tonino Zera | Maria Grazia Schirippa, Marco Bagnoli |
| 2023 (68th) | The Eight Mountains | Massimiliano Nocente | Marcella Galeone |
| 2023 (68th) | Exterior Night | Andrea Castorina | Marco Martucci, Laura Casalini |
| 2023 (68th) | Lord of the Ants | Marta Maffucci | Carolina Ferrara |
| 2024 (69th) | **Kidnapped** | **Andrea Castorina** | **Valeria Vecellio** |
| 2024 (69th) | La chimera | Emita Frigato | Rachele Meliadò |
| 2024 (69th) | Comandante | Carmine Guarino | Iole Autero |
| 2024 (69th) | Io capitano | Dimitri Capuani | Roberta Troncarelli |
| 2024 (69th) | There's Still Tomorrow | Paola Comencini | Fiorella Cicolini |
| 2025 (70th) | **The Flood** | Tonino Zera | Carlotta Desmann, Maria Grazia Schirripa |
| 2025 (70th) | The Art of Joy | Luca Merlini | Giulietta Rimoldi |
| 2025 (70th) | The Great Ambition | Alessandro Vannucci | Laura Casalini |
| 2025 (70th) | Parthenope | Carmine Guarino | Iole Autero |
| 2025 (70th) | Vermiglio | Pirra, Vito Giuseppe Zito | Sara Pergher |
| 2026 (71st) | **Forbidden City** | Andrea Castorina | Marco Martucci |
| 2026 (71st) | The Last One for the Road | Paula Muthen | Emilia Bonsembiante |
| 2026 (71st) | The Tasters | Paola Bizzarri | Igor Gabriel |
| 2026 (71st) | Duse | Gaspare De Pascali | Carlotta Desmann |
| 2026 (71st) | La grazia | Ludovica Ferrario | Laura Casalini |
