= Baraldi =

Baraldi is a surname. Notable people with the surname include:

- Angela Baraldi (born 1964), Italian actress and rock singer
- Barbara Baraldi, Italian mystery and fantasy writer
- Fabio Baraldi (born 1990), Italian water polo player
- Gianfranco Baraldi (1935–2026), Italian Olympic runner
- Lorenzo Baraldi (born 1940), Italian production designer and costume designer
- Pietro Neri-Baraldi (1828–1902), Italian opera singer
