= I Know That You Know That I Know =

1982 film

I Know That You Know That I Know (Io so che tu sai che io so)
- DVD cover
- Directed by: Alberto Sordi
- Written by: Augusto Caminito; Rodolfo Sonego
- Produced by: Augusto Caminito
- Starring: Alberto Sordi; Monica Vitti; Ivana Monti
- Cinematography: Sergio D'Offizi
- Edited by: Tatiana Casini Morigi
- Music by: Piero Piccioni
- Production company: Scena Film
- Distributed by: Medusa Distribuzione
- Release date: September 1982
- Running time: 118 minutes
- Country: Italy
- Language: Italian

I Know That You Know That I Know (Italian: Io so che tu sai che io so) is a 1982 Italian comedy-drama film directed by Alberto Sordi, who is also the co-protagonist with the Italian actress Monica Vitti. It was entered into the 13th Moscow International Film Festival where it won a Special Prize. The film's sets were designed by the art directors Lorenzo Baraldi and Massimo Tavazzi. It was shot on location around Rome.

== Cast ==
- Alberto Sordi as Fabio Bonetti
- Monica Vitti as Livia Bonetti
- Isabella De Bernardi as Veronica Bonetti
- Salvatore Jacono as Cavalli
- Giuseppe Mannajuolo as The Detective
- Ivana Monti as Valeria
- Micaela Pignatelli as Elena Vitali
- Claudio Gora as Ronconi
- Pier Francesco Aiello as Marco
- Napoleone Scrugli as Mirko
- Cesare Cadeo as Reporter
- Sandro Paternostro as himself
- Gianni Letta as himself
