= TG2 =

- Logo since 31 December 2012
- Starring: See Presenters section
- Country of origin: Italy
- Original language: Italian
- No. of episodes: N/A

Production
- Running time: generally 30 minutes

Original release
- Network: Rai 2
- Release: 4 November 1961 – present

TG2 (TeleGiornale 2) is the brand for the news programmes of Rai 2, the Italian state-owned television channel. The programmes are shown several times throughout the day — domestically on Rai 2, and across Europe, Africa, Americas, Asia and Australasia on Rai Italia. It was launched in 1961 as Telegiornale del Secondo Programma before adopting its current name on 15 March 1976.

== Editor and political leanings ==
The editor-in-chief of the programmes is Nicola Rao. The vice director is Carlo Pilieci. Originally TG2 was born politically near to the Italian Socialist Party (PSI), the Italian Republican Party (PRI) and the Italian Communist Party (PCI).

=== History and directors of TG2 ===
Name of the head	Director	Period	Notes
Telegiornale of Second Program	Ugo Zatterin	4 November 1961 - 9 September 1975	
Telegiornale of Second Program	Alberto Sensini	10 September 1975 - 17 February 1976	
Tg2	Andrea Barbato	18 February 1976 - 12 October 1980	
Tg2	Ugo Zatterin	13 October 1980 - 22 August 1986	
Tg2	Antonio Ghirelli	23 August 1986 - 29 December 1989	
Tg2	Alberto La Volpe	30 December 1989 - 19 July 1993	
Tg2	Paolo Garimberti	20 July 1993 - 26 June 1994	
Tg2	Clemente Mimun	27 June 1994 - 5 May 2002	
Tg2	Mauro Mazza	6 May 2002 - 11 June 2009	
Tg2	Mario De Scalzi	12 June 2009 - 22 July 2009	ad interim
Tg2	Mario Orfeo	23 July 2009 - 31 March 2011	
Tg2	Mario De Scalzi	1 April 2011 - 22 June 2011	ad interim
Tg2	Marcello Masi	23 June 2011 - 3 August 2016	
Tg2	Ida Colucci	4 August 2016 - 31 October 2018	
Tg2	Gennaro Sangiuliano	31 October 2018 - 21 October 2022	
Tg2	Carlo Pilieci	21 October - 14 December 2022	ad interim
Tg2	Nicola Rao	14 December 2022 - 25 May 2023	
Tg2	Antonio Preziosi	25 May 2023 - present	

== Programme format ==
The programs are generally presented by a single newsreader but with additional newsreaders for sports features. Most items are pre-recorded reports and are generally followed by a correspondent reporting live from the scene of the report.

Until 2019, it used a one-line red scrolling news ticker which features breaking news.

== Weekly programme ==
Name	Description
TG2 Costume e Società	Fashion and Styles
TG2 Dossier	
TG2 Storie	
TG2 Cinematinée	Film
TG2 Achab Libri	Literature
TG2 Medicina 33	Health
Meteo 2	Weather forecast with data provided by Aeronautica Militare (the Italian Air Force)
TG2 Salute	Health
TG2 Mizar	
TG2 Sì Viaggiare	Travel
TG2 Eat Parade	Cooking
TG2 Motori	Automobiles

== Edition and presenters ==
=== TG2 Mattina ===
From Monday to Friday at 08:30 (about 10 minutes). Presenters:

- Giulia Apollonio
- Marco Bezmalinovich
- Alfredo Cardone
- Vincenzo Frenda
- Simonetta Guidotti

=== TG2 Flash ===
From Monday to Friday at 10:55 (about 5 minutes). The presenters are the same of the morning edition.

=== TG2 ore 13:00 ===
From Monday to Sunday at 13:00 (about 30 minutes). Presenters:

- Laura Corsi
- Piergiorgio Giacovazzo
- Chiara Lico
- Daniele Rotondo
- Stefania Zane

=== TG2 L.I.S./TG2 Pomeriggio ===
From Monday to Sunday at 17:55 and 18:00 on weekends. Presenters:

- Elena Malizia
- Chiara Prato
- Laura Sansavini
- Silvia Vaccarezza

=== TG2 ore 20:30 ===
From Monday to Sunday at 20:30 (about 24–33 minutes). Presenters:

- Adele Ammendola
- Fabio Chiucconi
- Francesca Romana Elisei
- Maurizio Martinelli
- Lisa Marzoli
- Luca Moriconi

== See also ==
- Rai 2
