= Andrea Barbato =

Italian journalist, writer, and politician (1934–1996)

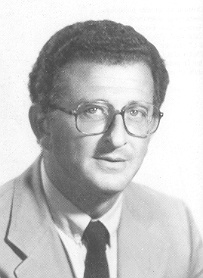
- Born: 7 March 1934; Rome, Italy
- Died: 12 February 1996 (aged 61); Rome, Italy
- Occupations: Journalist, politician, writer

Andrea Barbato (7 March 1934 – 12 February 1996) was an Italian journalist, politician, author, broadcaster, and screenwriter.

Barbato was born in Rome. He started his career in journalism in 1956 working as a correspondent for the BBC. He also started writing for periodicals and newspapers, including L'espresso and Il Giorno, in 1968 he was hired by RAI and worked as speaker for the twelve o'clock news edition at telegiornale. In 1971 he began working for La Stampa and was later appointed deputy editor of La Repubblica. Between 1976 and 1980 he was the editor of TG2, and in 1982 he became the editor of the newspaper Paese Sera.

In 1983, Barbato was elected to the Chamber of Deputies with the Independent Left. In 1987 he started working for RAI 3 as a programme author and host.

Barbato has also authored several books, stage dramas, and screenplays. In 1992, he won the Nastro d'Argento for the script of Francesco Maselli's A Simple Story.

Barbato died in 1996 from surgery complications because of a malformation of the abdominal aorta. He was married to actress Ivana Monti and had two sons.
