= Mario Garbuglia =

Italian set designer (1927–2010)

- Born: 27 May 1927; Civitanova Marche, Italy
- Died: 30 March 2010 (aged 82); Rome, Italy
- Occupation: Set designer
- Years active: 1950–2010

Mario Garbuglia (Fontespina, a district of Civitanova Marche, 27 May 1927 – Rome, 30 March 2010) was an Italian set designer. He won the David di Donatello for Best Production Design, the Nastro d'Argento, and a BAFTA.

== Life ==
Garbuglia's professional debut as a designer came in 1950 with Women Without Names, directed by Géza von Radványi. Over the years, he worked with directors such as Luchino Visconti, Mario Monicelli, Luigi Zampa, and Roger Vadim. He died in 2010 after a long illness.

== Filmography ==
- Women Without Names (1950)
- The Blind Woman of Sorrento (1952)
- Three Girls from Rome (1952)
- High School (1954)
- Too Bad She's Bad (1954)
- The Art of Getting Along (1954)
- Desert Warrior (1957)
- A Farewell to Arms (1957)
- You're on Your Own (1959)
- The Great War (1959)
- Rocco and His Brothers (1960)
- The Best of Enemies (1961)
- Boccaccio '70 (1962, segment: "Il lavoro")
- Disorder (1962)
- The Leopard (1963), Nastro d'Argento
- The Organizer (1963)
- My Wife (1964)
- Casanova 70 (1965)
- Sandra (1965)
- After the Fox (1966)
- Kiss the Girls and Make Them Die (1966)
- The Witches (1967)
- Sin with a Stranger (1967)
- Caprice Italian Style (1968, segment: "Che cosa sono le nuvole?")
- Barbarella (1968)
- Waterloo (1970), BAFTA Award for Best Production Design
- Brancaleone at the Crusades (1970)
- Lady Liberty (1971)
- The Valachi Papers (1972)
- Polvere di stelle (1973)
- Battle of Sutjeska (1973)
- Chino (1973)
- War Goddess (1973)
- Conversation Piece (1974)
- End of the Game (1975)
- The Innocent (1976)
- Orca (1977)
- Wifemistress (1977)
- La Cage aux Folles (1978)
- Orient Express (TV, 1979)
- The Lady of the Camellias (1981), David di Donatello
- Lion of the Desert (1981)
- La disubbidienza (1981)
- The World of Don Camillo (1983)
- Woman of Wonders (1985)
- Mussolini and I (TV, 1985)
- Beethoven's Nephew (1985)
- La Cage aux Folles 3: The Wedding (1985)
- Oci ciornie (1987)
- Julia and Julia (1987)
- The Miser (1990)
- L'assedio di Venezia (1991)
- Troublemakers (1994)
- The Sky Is Falling (2000)
