= Luciano Ricceri =

Italian production designer (1940–2020)

- Born: 26 April 1940; Rome, Italy
- Died: 1 February 2020 (aged 79); Orte, Italy
- Occupations: Production designer Costume designer
- Years active: 1962–2020

Luciano Ricceri (26 April 1940 – 1 February 2020) was an Italian production designer and costume designer, winner of the David di Donatello for Best Production Design for the 1991 film Captain Fracassa's Journey and the 2001 film Unfair Competition.

== Biography ==
Ricceri began his career in the early 1960s, being an assistant to Piero Gherardi on the sets of Federico Fellini's 8½ and Juliet of the Spirits. He later became a loyal collaborator of Ettore Scola, working on many of his films, including Captain Fracassa's Journey, which earned him the Nastro d'Argento for Best Production Design, and Unfair Competition, for which he won the David di Donatello for Best Production Design. He won the Golden Osella for The Gold Rimmed Glasses (1987).

Ricceri was also a very prolific production designer for television series: he built the sets of Giuliano Montaldo's Marco Polo entirely in studios. He was later hired on Inspector Montalbano, building the sets of 19 episodes between 1999 and 2017.

Ricceri died in Orte on 1 February 2020, at the age of 79.

== Filmography ==
=== Films ===
- Il mio amico Benito (1962)
- The Devil in Love (1966)
- The Tiger and the Pussycat (1967)
- The Vatican Affair (1968)
- I See Naked (1969)
- Normal Young Man (1969)
- The Pizza Triangle (1970)
- Without Family (1972)
- The Most Wonderful Evening of My Life (1972)
- Trevico-Turin: Voyage in Fiatnam (1973)
- Teresa the Thief (1973)
- We All Loved Each Other So Much (1974)
- The Immortal Bachelor (1975)
- Blonde in Black Leather (1975)
- The Career of a Chambermaid (1976)
- Down and Dirty (1976)
- The Forbidden Room (1977)
- A Special Day (1977)
- I nuovi mostri (1977)
- Dear Father (1979)
- Happy Hobos (1979)
- La terrazza (1980)
- Hearts and Armour (1983)
- Le Bal (1983)
- Macaroni (1985)
- The Berlin Affair (1985)
- The Family (1987)
- Control (1987)
- The Gold Rimmed Glasses (1987)
- Splendor (1989)
- What Time Is It? (1989)
- Captain Fracassa's Journey (1990)
- L'Atlantide (1992)
- Romanzo di un giovane povero (1995)
- A Cold, Cold Winter (1996)
- Kaputt Mundi (1998)
- The Dinner (1998)
- Unfair Competition (2001)
- People of Rome (2003)
- How Strange to Be Named Federico (2013)

=== TV series ===
- L'Odissea (1967)
- Marco Polo (1982)
- Un medico in famiglia (1998)
- Inspector Montalbano (1999–2017)

== Awards ==
- 1991: Nastro d'Argento for Best Production Design for Captain Fracassa's Journey
- 1991: David di Donatello for Best Production Design for Captain Fracassa's Journey
- 2001: David di Donatello for Best Production Design for Unfair Competition
