= Sad Hill Cemetery =

Film location, Spain

- Cementerio de Sad Hill
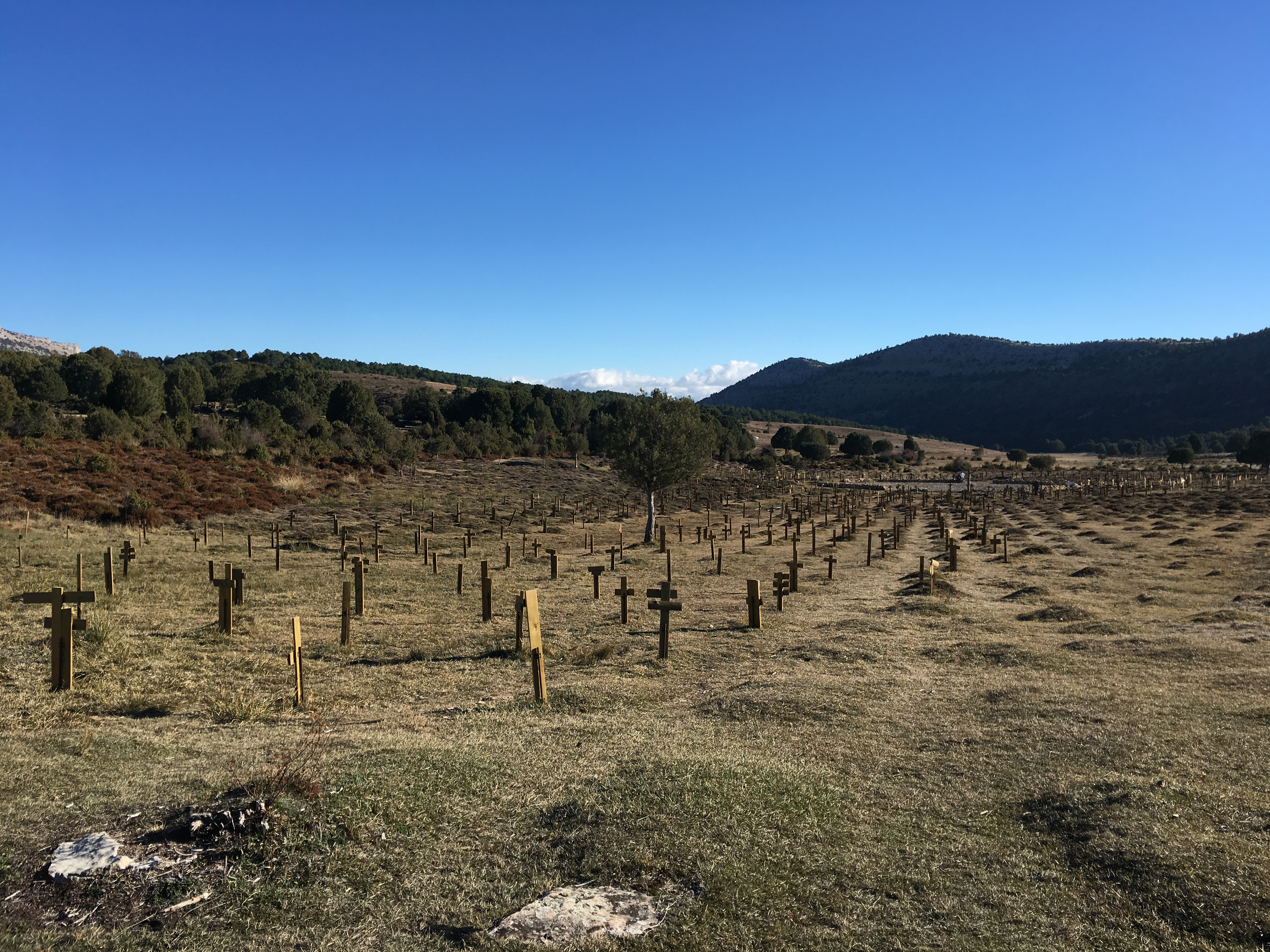
- Interactive map of Sad Hill Cemetery

Details
- Established: 1966
- Abandoned: 1966
- Location: Santo Domingo de Silos, Burgos
- Country: Spain
- Coordinates: 41.990429°N 3.408454°W
- Type: Movie set
- Style: Western
- Owned by: Asociación Cultural Sad Hill
- No. of interments: 0
- No. of cremations: 0
- Website: http://www.acsadhill.es/

Sad Hill Cemetery (Spanish: Cementerio de Sad Hill; Italian: Cimitero di Sad Hill) is a tourism site and former film location in Contreras, Burgos (northern Spain), designed by Carlo Simi in 1966 and built by the Spanish Army.

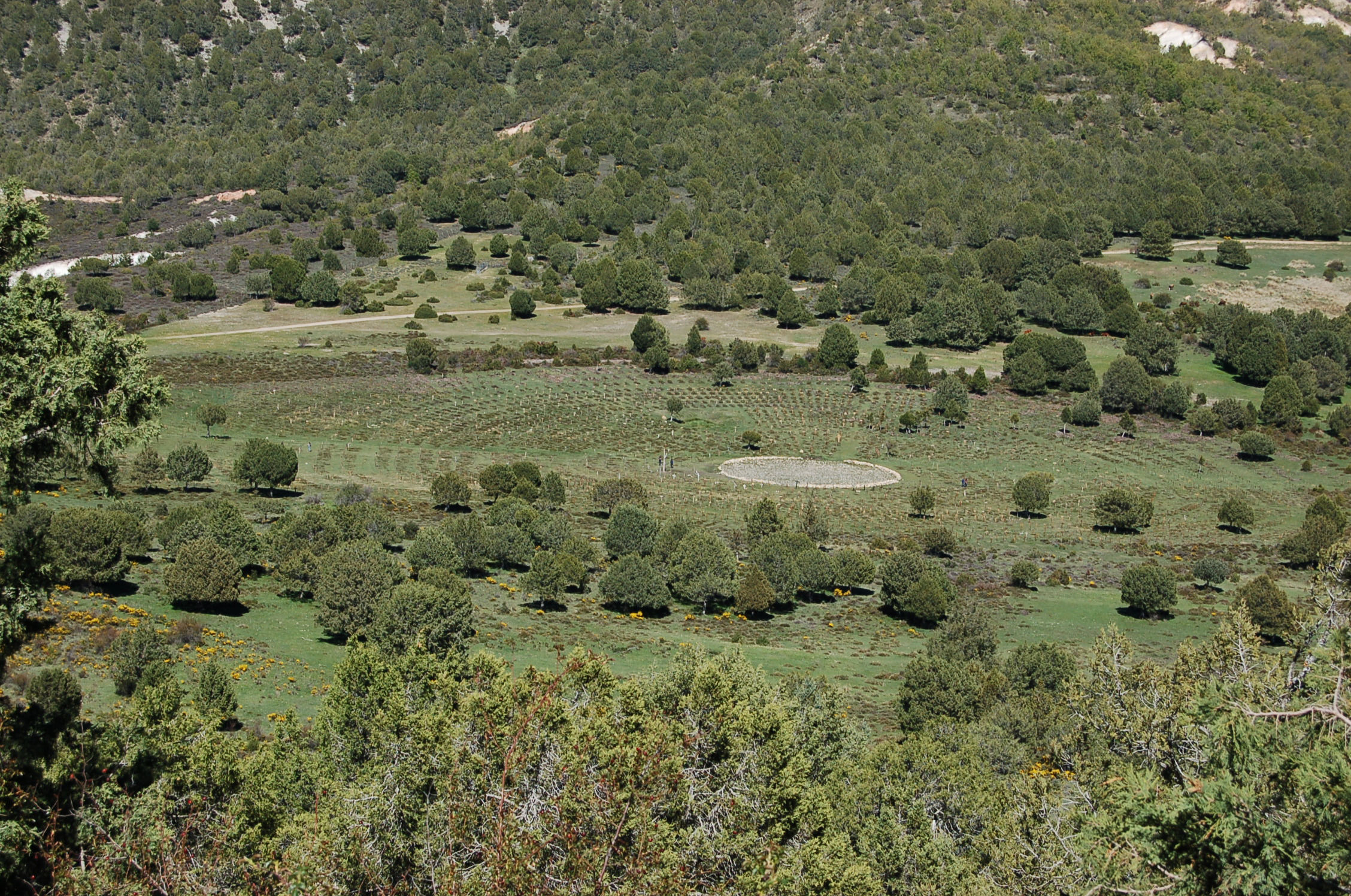
Sad Hill seen from an aerial point of view. The circle in the centre is the location for the epic Mexican standoff between bounty hunter Blondie, bandit Tuco Ramírez, and mercenary Angel Eyes.

== Significance ==
Sad Hill Cemetery is where the last sequence was filmed for the film The Good, the Bad and the Ugly (1966). Spain has had success in attracting tourists to sites related to spaghetti Westerns (notably in Almería). Sad Hill was rebuilt in 2015. The reconstruction was recorded in the documentary Sad Hill Unearthed (2017) by Guillermo de Oliveira.

== Status ==
In 2017, the Asociación Cultural Sad Hill (Sad Hill Cultural Association) planned to name Sad Hill Cemetery a Bien de Interés Cultural.

In 2024, the Sabinares del Arlanza Natural Park announced a plan to rebuild the Betterville prisoner camp at its filmed location about 6 km from Sad Hill. The stockade will be rebuilt using thousands of Juniperus thurifera that burned in 2022 in Santo Domingo de Silos.

== See also ==
- Spaghetti Western
- Cinema of Italy
