= The Five Days =

1973 film by Dario Argento

- Theatrical release poster
- Italian: Le cinque giornate
- Directed by: Dario Argento
- Screenplay by: Dario Argento; Nanni Balestrini
- Story by: Enzo Ungari; Dario Argento; Luigi Cozzi; Franco Catalano
- Produced by: Salvatore Argento
- Starring: Adriano Celentano; Enzo Cerusico; Marilù Tolo; Luisa De Santis; Sergio Graziani; Carla Tato; Glauco Onorato; Ivana Monti
- Cinematography: Luigi Kuveiller
- Edited by: Franco Fraticelli
- Music by: Giorgio Gaslini
- Production company: Seda Spettacoli
- Distributed by: Euro International Films
- Release date: 20 December 1973
- Running time: 122 minutes
- Country: Italy
- Language: Italian

The Five Days (Italian: Le cinque giornate; also known as The Five Days of Milan) is a 1973 Italian historical comedy-drama film directed by Dario Argento. The film is set during the Five Days of Milan in 1848.

== Plot ==
The film is set in Milan during the Five Days of Milan, an anti-Austrian revolt which took place between 18-22 March 1848. A petty criminal, Meo Cainazzo, (played by singer Adriano Celentano) escapes from prison following an artillery bombardment and goes in search of his gang leader Zampino. Along the way he meets and befriends a good-natured Roman baker, Romulus (Enzo Cerusico) who has come to Milan to help his uncle with work. The pair are involved in a series of tragicomic events: they help to erect a barricade using furniture belonging to a nymphomaniac countess, they help a woman give birth and they are recruited against their will into an ambitious baron, Trazunto's brigade, all while witness the "patriots" violence and the Austrians reprisals. Later, a man denounces his girlfriend as a collaborator, as she is sleeping with a soldier. Baron Trazunto's men swoop down on her and the soldier, killing the soldier, and Trazunto goes to rape the girl. Romulus tries to defend her, and in the fight Trazunto falls down the stairs and dies. Romulus is taken away and shot. Cainazzo is reunited with Zampino, only to discover he had been working with the Austrians, becoming exasperated that the revolution was a lie.

== Cast ==
- Adriano Celentano as Cainazzo
- Enzo Cerusico as Romolo Marcelli
- Marilù Tolo as the countess
- Luisa De Santis as pregnant woman
- Glauco Onorato as Zampino
- Carla Tato as the widow
- Sergio Graziani as Baron Tranzunto
- Ivana Monti as woman raped by Tranzunto

== Production ==
The film was principally shot in Pavia, with some scenes shot in Milan and Arcore.

== Release ==
The Five Days was released in Italy on 20 December 1973.
