= Ivana Monti =

Italian actress

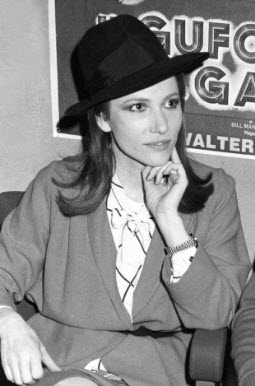
- Monti in 1982
- Born: 20 February 1947 (age 78); Milan, Italy
- Occupation: Actress

Ivana Monti (born 20 February 1947) is an Italian stage, television and film actress.

== Life and career ==
Born in Milan, Monti studied at the drama school of the Piccolo Teatro in her hometown, and made her professional debut in 1966 in the stage play I giganti della montagna directed by Giorgio Strehler. He also directed her in King Lear (1972) and in The Trial of Lucullus (1973).

Monti was mainly active on television, in TV-movies and series. She also appeared in a number of films, mainly cast in supporting roles.

Monti was married to journalist Andrea Barbato until his death in 1996.

== Filmography ==
Year	Title	Role	Notes
1969	The Tunnel Under the World		
1973	The Five Days	Woman who Tranzunto rapes	
1980	Contraband	Adele Di Angelo	
1980	Men or Not Men	Lorena	
1982	I Know That You Know That I Know	Valeria	
1993	Giovanni Falcone	Marcelle Padovani	
2001	La bella di Mosca		
2016	La rugiada di San Giovanni	Felicita Prandi	(final film role)
