= Sad Hill Unearthed =

2018 documentary by Guillermo de Oliveira

- Theatrical release poster
- Spanish: Desenterrando Sad Hill
- Directed by: Guillermo de Oliveira
- Written by: Guillermo de Oliveira
- Produced by: Luisa Cowell; Guillermo de Oliveira
- Starring: David Alba Romero; Sergio García Hernández; Diego Montero; Joseba del Valle; Christopher Frayling; Eugenio Alabiso; Sergio Salvati; Álex de la Iglesia; Stephen Leigh; Peter J. Hanley; James Hetfield; Joe Dante; Ennio Morricone; Clint Eastwood
- Cinematography: Guillermo de Oliveira
- Edited by: Guillermo de Oliveira; Javier Duch
- Music by: Zeltia Montes
- Production companies: Zapruder Pictures; Sadhill Desenterrado AIE
- Distributed by: Con Un Pack Distribución
- Release dates: 31 October 2017 (Tokyo International Film Festival); 6 October 2018
- Running time: 86 minutes
- Country: Spain
- Languages: Spanish; English; Italian; French

Sad Hill Unearthed (Spanish: Desenterrando Sad Hill) is a 2017 Spanish documentary film directed by Guillermo de Oliveira.

It has interviews with Clint Eastwood, Ennio Morricone, and James Hetfield of Metallica. It was released at Sitges Film Festival. It is set in the locations where The Good, the Bad and the Ugly was shot, including Sad Hill Cemetery where Clint Eastwood, Lee Van Cleef and Eli Wallach had their showdown. The documentary shows the reconstruction of the cemetery.

It was nominated for Goya Awards for Best Documentary Film.

== Reception ==
On Rotten Tomatoes it holds a score of a 100% based on 5 reviews with a mean of 7.7 of a possible 10.

== Cast ==
- Ennio Morricone
- James Hetfield
- Joe Dante
- Clint Eastwood
- Sergio Leone
- Álex de la Iglesia
- Sergio Salvati
- Joseba del Valle
- David Alba Romero
- Sergio García Hernández
- Diego Montero
- Eugenio Alabiso
- Stephen Leigh
- Daniel Jeffery
- Carlo Leva
- Peter J. Hanley
- Christopher Frayling
- Will Ross
- Devan Scott
