= Sandro Paternostro =

Italian television journalist (1922–2000)

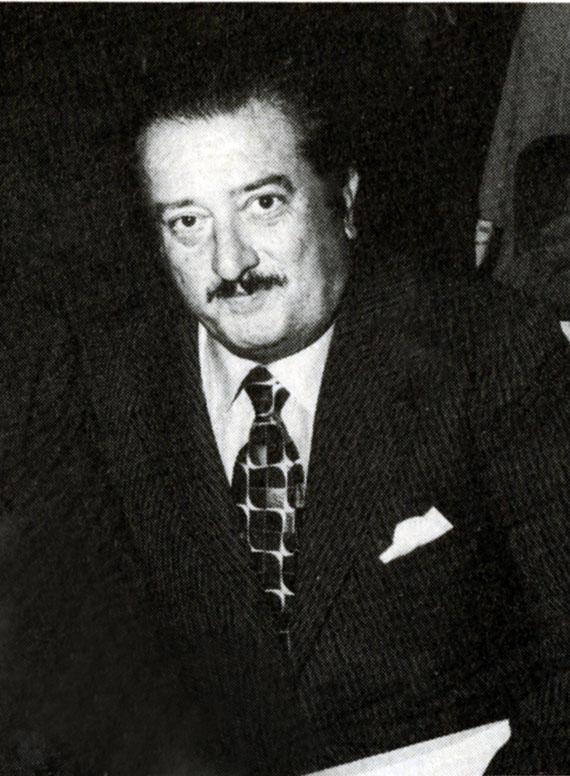
Sandro Paternostro

Sandro Paternostro (9 August 1922 – 23 July 2000) was an Italian journalist and television presenter.

== Biography ==
Born in Palermo, Paternostro began writing for Palermo’s newspaper L'Ora after the war, and then went on to write for other mainstream newspapers before moving to radio in the early 1950s.

He then went on to become the foreign correspondent, from numerous capitals of the world, for the Telegiornale Rai–Italian Television's national news. In the 60’s he reported from Bonn, the former capital of West Germany, where he also met and married his first wife Karin. He then went on to Peking during the years of the Cultural Revolution in China, and he recounted his experiences with great irony in his celebrated book called Qui Pechino in 1971.

He continued his work as foreign correspondent for RAI in London, where he reported the news with professionalism and accuracy, but always with an ironic remark which made him one of the most popular journalists of his era together with Ruggero Orlando. With this irony, he was also famed for his quirky trademarks, which brought about many televised impersonations.

After 37 years he retired as a journalist for RAI. He continued to write regularly for Il Corriere Della Sera and Il Giorno, national Italian broadsheet newspapers. In 1988 from Visnews in London, he launched his own daily international news bulletin called Teledomani, broadcast on the TV Italia circuit. Teledomani is one of the first daily international news bulletin programmes to be broadcast via satellite. The programme was not only an editorial experiment, but also a technical one coordinated by Sal Sparace (one of the current technical directors of Sky TV London). Paternostro had a comeback as a television personality with Piero Chiambretti on Raitre in programmes such as Prove Techniche di Trasmissione (1989) and Servizi Segreti (1993). The most popular programme of this period was Diritto di Replica (1991) with Fabio Fazio, Oreste De Fornari, Stefano Magagnoli and Enrico Magrelli in which reports and interviews were shown on controversial current affair issues and the programme always concluded with an interview with a section of quick fired direct questions.

At 76 he married Carmen Di Pietro, 40 years his junior creating a stir amongst the tabloid press.

In his remaining years, due to ill health he returned to London and lived with his two children Roberto and Sandra. He died in London in the summer of 2000.

== Published works ==
=== Books ===
- Ridi Milena c’e’ L’Arcobalena 1942
- Il Vento in Faccia
- Qui Pecchino vi Parla Sandro Paternostro 1971
- La Cina di Mao 1972

=== Films ===
- Io so che tu sai che io so 1982
- Quando finiranno le zanzare 1994
- Linda e il brigadiere –la bellezza dell’asino 1997
- Paparazzi 1998
