= Santo Domingo de Silos =

Coordinates: 41°58′N 3°25′W

- Municipality and town
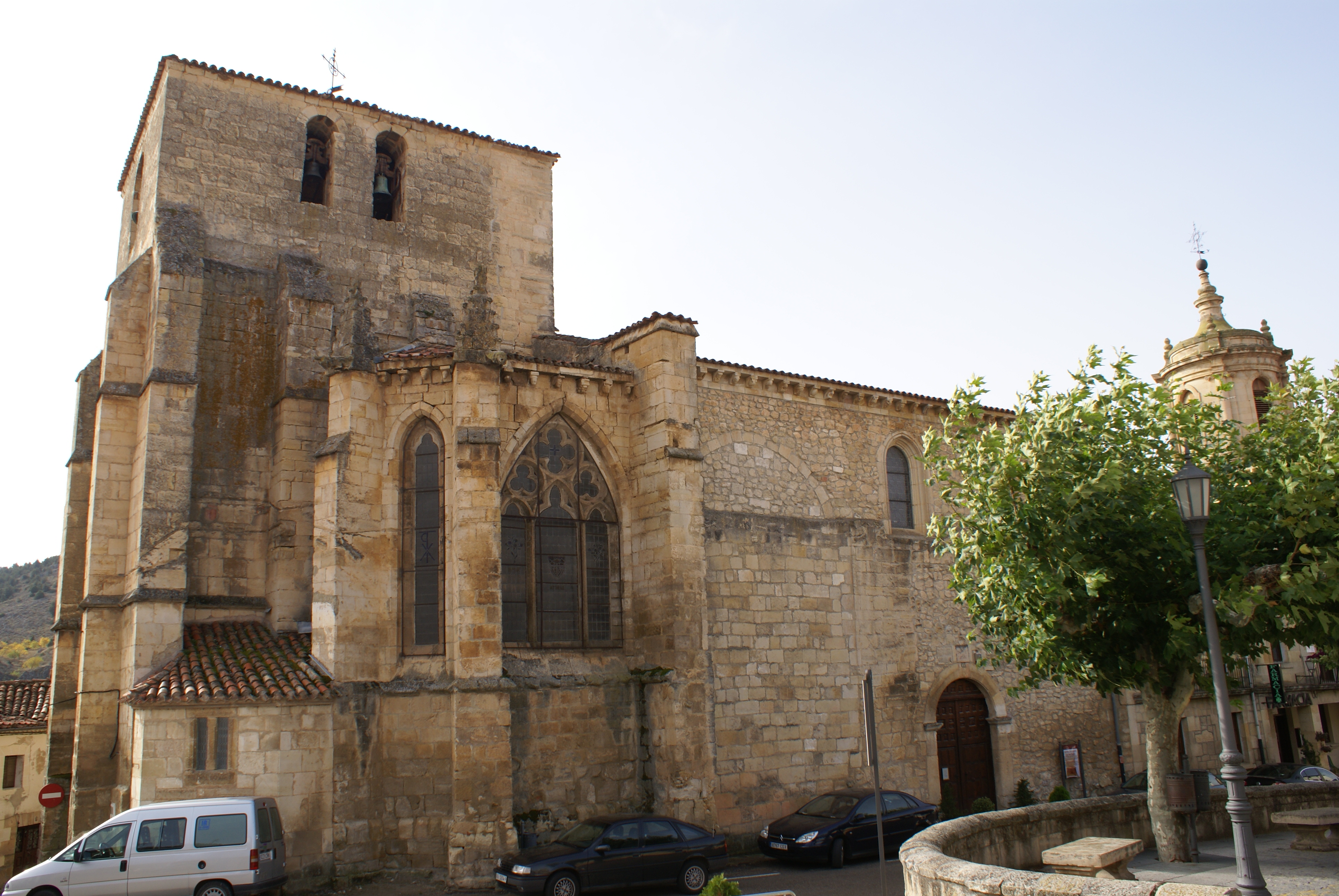
- Church in Santo Domingo de Silos

- Coat of arms
- Interactive map of Santo Domingo de Silos
- Country: Spain
- Autonomous community: Castile and León
- Province: Burgos
- Comarca: La Demanda

Area
  - Total: 78.91 km^{2} (30.47 sq mi)
- Elevation: 1,007 m (3,304 ft)

Population (2025-01-01)
  - Total: 251
  - Density: 3.18/km^{2} (8.24/sq mi)
- Time zone: UTC+1 (CET)
  - Summer (DST): UTC+2 (CEST)
- Postal code: 09610
- Website: http://www.santodomingodesilos.es/

Santo Domingo de Silos is a municipality and town located in the province of Burgos, Castile and León, Spain. According to the 2022 census (INE), the municipality had a population of 264 inhabitants. It comprises the villages of Hinojar de Cervera, Hortezuelos, Peñacoba and Santo Domingo de Silos.

The heritage listing of conjunto histórico preserves the village. Touristically, it forms the so-called "Arlanza Triangle" with the neighboring towns of Lerma and Covarrubias, and it also lies along the Camino del Cid.

Some researchers suggest that the Abbey of Santo Domingo de Silos is linked to the history of Rodrigo Díaz de Vivar (El Cid Campeador), as he and his wife Jimena donated some of their estates to abbey, whose cloister was still under construction in 1081, the year El Cid was exiled.

== Main sights ==
- Abbey of Santo Domingo de Silos (7th-18th century).
- Sad Hill Cemetery, reconstructed set of the film The Good, the Bad and the Ugly (1966)
