= Lorenzo Baraldi =

Italian costume designer and film producer (born 1940)

- Born: Gianlorenzo Baraldi; 30 October 1940 (age 84); Parma, Italy
- Occupations: Scenographer; costume designer; film producer
- Years active: 1968–present
- Website: lorenzobaraldi.it

Gianlorenzo Baraldi (born 30 October 1940 in Parma) is an Italian costume designer and film producer. He won a Nastro d'Argento for Best Scenography and a David di Donatello for Best Production Design for the film Il Marchese del Grillo by Mario Monicelli in 1982.

== Biography ==
Lorenzo Baraldi studied at the faculty of set design of the Istituto d'Arte Paolo Toschi in Parma, Italy, and attended set decoration classes at the Accademia di Belle Arti di Brera in Milan. He taught set decoration at the Accademia di Belle Arti in Viterbo from 1993 to 1995, at the Centro Sperimentale di Cinematografia from 1994 to 1995, at the Accademia di Costume e Moda in Rome from 1995 to 1998, at the Associazione Scenografi Costumisti e Arredatori from 1998 to 1999, at the Istituto Europeo di Design (I.E.D.) during the academic year 2005–2006, and at the campus for arts students of the Sannio Film Festival in the years 2008 and 2009. He made a series of lectures on scenography and scenotechnics at the Istituto d'Arte Paolo Toschi in Parma in the winter of 1996 and in 2000–2001.

Baraldi began his career in cinema as a set decorator for the film Tepepa (1968), directed by Giulio Petroni. He created the sets of various films and television productions, including The Roses of the Desert, The Two Lives of Mattia Pascal, Bertoldo, Bertoldino e Cacasenno, All My Friends Part 2, Il Marchese del Grillo, Hurricane Rosy, Lovers and Liars, An Average Little Man, Goodnight, Ladies and Gentlemen, My Friends (film), and many others.

Baraldi has also worked for directors outside Italy, such as French director Georges Lautner, on the film Le Guignolo (1980), and Michael Radford, on Il Postino: The Postman (1994).

Baraldi was involved in the creation of the 43 columns of the atrium of the Cultural Centre of the Alhóndiga Bilbao in Spain. The history of this project is the subject of a 2010 documentary film.

== Filmography ==
Production

- 43 Colonne in scena a Bilbao (2010), documentary by Leonardo Baraldi and Eleonora Sarasin

Production design

- La notte che Evelyn uscì dalla tomba (1971), by Emilio Miraglia
- I due assi del guantone (1971), by Mariano Laurenti
- La dama rossa uccide sette volte (1972), by Emilio P. Miraglia
- Tony Arzenta – Big Guns (1973), by Duccio Tessari
- Sessomatto (1973), by Dino Risi
- Romanzo popolare (1974), by Mario Monicelli
- Profumo di donna (1974), by Dino Risi
- Amici miei (1975), by Mario Monicelli
- Signore e signori, buonanotte (1976), by Mario Monicelli
- Un borghese piccolo piccolo (1977), by Mario Monicelli
- Dove vai in vacanza? (1978), in three episodes, by Mauro Bolognini, segments "Le vacanze intelligenti" and "Sarò tutta per te"
- Viaggio con Anita (1979), by Mario Monicelli
- Temporale Rosy (1980), by Mario Monicelli
- I seduttori della domenica (1980), in four episodes, segment 4 "Roma (Armando's Notebook)", by Dino Risi
- Io e Caterina (1980), by Alberto Sordi
- Nudo di donna (1981), by Nino Manfredi
- Il marchese del Grillo (1981), by Mario Monicelli
- Amici miei atto II (1982), by Mario Monicelli
- Grog (1982), by Francesco Laudadio
- Io so che tu sai che io so (1982), by Alberto Sordi
- Storia di Piera (1983), by Marco Ferreri
- Bertoldo, Bertoldino e Cacasenno (1984), by Mario Monicelli
- Le due vite di Mattia Pascal (1985), by Mario Monicelli
- Joan Lui - Ma un giorno nel paese arrivo io di lunedì (1985), by Adriano Celentano
- La coda del diavolo (1986), by Giorgio Treves
- I giorni randagi (1988), by Filippo Ottoni
- Musica per vecchi animali (1989), by Stefano Benni together with Umberto Angelucci
- Errore fatale (1991), TV film, by Filippo De Luigi
- Caldo soffocante (1991), by Giovanna Gagliardo
- Piedipiatti (1991), by Carlo Vanzina
- Condannato a nozze (1993), by Giuseppe Piccioni
- Il Postino: The Postman (1994), by Michael Radford
- Palla di neve (1995), by Maurizio Nichetti
- Carogne (1995), by Enrico Caria
- Bruno aspetta in macchina (1996), by Duccio Camerini
- Gli eredi (Les héritiers) (1997), TV, by Josée Dayan
- Trenta righe per un delitto (1998), miniseries, by Lodovico Gasparini
- Frigidaire - Il film (1998), by Giorgio Fabris
- Baci e abbracci (1999), by Paolo Virzì
- Amore a prima vista (1999), by Vincenzo Salemme
- Rosa e Cornelia (2000), by Giorgio Treves
- I cavalieri che fecero l'impresa (2001), by Pupi Avati
- Resurrezione (2001), miniseries, by Paolo e Vittorio Taviani
- La guerra è finita (2002), miniseries, by Lodovico Gasparini
- Luisa Sanfelice (2004), miniseries, by Paolo e Vittorio Taviani
- Al di là delle frontiere (2004), TV, by Maurizio Zaccaro
- Il bell'Antonio (2005), miniseries, by Maurizio Zaccaro
- Le rose del deserto (2006), by Mario Monicelli
- Fuga sul Kenya (2008), by Gabriele Iacovone
- Trilussa - Storia d'amore e di poesia (2013), by Lodovico Gasparini

Art direction

- La notte che Evelyn uscì dalla tomba (1971), by Emilio Miraglia
- Vogliamo i colonnelli (1973), by Mario Monicelli
- Tony Arzenta – Big Guns (1973), by Duccio Tessari
- Romanzo popolare (1974), by Mario Monicelli
- L'anatra all'arancia (1975), by Luciano Salce
- Pummarò (1990), by Michele Placido
- Baci e abbracci (1999), by Paolo Virzì
- Honolulu Baby (2001), by Maurizio Nichetti
- Il bell'Antonio (2005), miniseries, by Maurizio Zaccaro
- Volesse il cielo! (2002), by Vincenzo Salemme

Set decoration

- Tepepa (1968), by Giulio Petroni
- T'ammazzo! - Raccomandati a Dio (1968), by Osvaldo Civirani
- La moglie del prete (1971), by Dino Risi
- I due assi del guantone (1971), by Mariano Laurenti
- L'uccello migratore (1972), by Steno
- Tony Arzenta – Big Guns (1973), by Duccio Tessari
- Caro Michele (1976), by Mario Monicelli
- Le Guignolo (1980), by Georges Lautner

Costume design

- La notte che Evelyn uscì dalla tomba (1971), by Emilio Miraglia
- Continuavano a chiamarli i due piloti più matti del mondo (1972), by Mariano Laurenti
- La dama rossa uccide sette volte (1972), by Emilio P. Miraglia
- Signore e signori, buonanotte (1976), by Mario Monicelli
