= Captain Fracassa's Journey =

1990 film

- Film poster
- Directed by: Ettore Scola
- Screenplay by: Furio Scarpelli; Ettore Scola
- Story by: Vincenzo Cerami; Fulvio Ottaviano; Silvia Scola
- Based on: Captain Fracasse by Théophile Gautier
- Produced by: Mario Cecchi Gori; Vittorio Cecchi Gori; Luciano Ricceri
- Starring: Massimo Troisi; Vincent Perez; Ornella Muti; Toni Ucci; Ciccio Ingrassia; Claudio Amendola
- Cinematography: Luciano Tovoli
- Edited by: Raimondo Crociani
- Music by: Armando Trovajoli
- Distributed by: Cecchi Gori Group (Italy); Gaumont Distribution (France)
- Release dates: 31 October 1990 (Italy); 8 May 1991 (France)
- Running time: 123 minutes
- Countries: Italy; France
- Languages: Italian; French

Captain Fracassa's Journey (Italian: Il viaggio di Capitan Fracassa) is a 1990 Italian comedy film directed by Ettore Scola. The film is based on the 1863 novel Captain Fracasse by Théophile Gautier. It was entered into the 41st Berlin International Film Festival.

== Plot ==
The story takes place in France during the 17th century. A ramshackle theater company of Commedia dell'arte (Comedy of Art) has to roam through the provinces, hoping to reach the court of \Louis XIII. However, it often remains for days on a single place. In fact, a member of the company is seriously ill and so the actor who plays Punch (Troisi) tells how it all took place to a traveler who sees the bandwagon. The theater company recently was already going to visit the King of France that he might have better luck presenting their games and shows, but they ran into a storm. There, the members sought refuge in what appeared a ruined castle, where they are greeted by a servant (Ciccio Ingrassia) and his young impoverished master, Baron Sigognac. The servant understands well that the young man would spend a useless life if he continued to live with him, and throws him out the next day with the company so that it can find fortune. The young man struggles to acclimate to the new conditions imposed on him, but gradually get used to and make friends with almost all the members of the company who all have an interesting story to tell about their past.

Sigognac will fall in love but also of Serafina, finding themselves in difficulty because of its poor conditions and fear of poverty also drag the baron, flees. Among cheerful evenings in villages to interpret and shows coarse farces and trouble with bandits in the woods, the company reaches the court of the nobleman Bruyeres, who offers a satisfactory amount of money the company of the three girls to play shows just for him. That just happens during the evening also Sigognac, called in to replace a sick actor, must play a role. But the young man is totally inexperienced in theater and his arrival on the scene is likely to drop all of the magical spell of the show. But the young unexpected jokes and also performs some carelessly tumbled by blowing up the audience in a roar of laughter. Now a new company was born in the theatrical mask that encloses together "Captain" and "Idiot Servant" Captain Fracassa. The success was immediate, but Sigognac will not be happy for long because that night he collides with a noble bearing violence to a girl of the company. Sigognac, paying appeal to his duties as noble gentleman, a duel rival but proves to be more skilled than him and seriously injured. Then violent fever attacks the poor young man. Again here the beginning of the story: the members of the company, reduced to a few because of the death of some and neglect of others, succeed with a last effort to reach Paris where staged their show with the Captain Fracassa. The performance of Commedia dell'Arte in France is a huge success and the actors become the courtiers of Louis.

== Cast ==
- Vincent Perez as Baron of Sigognac
- Emmanuelle Béart as Isabella
- Massimo Troisi as Pulcinella
- Ornella Muti as Serafina
- Lauretta Masiero as Lady Leonarde
- Toni Ucci as The tyrant
- Massimo Wertmüller as Leandre
- Jean-François Perrier as Matamore
- Tosca D'Aquino as Zerbina
- Giuseppe Cederna
- Mariangela Giordano
- Claudio Amendola as Agostino
- Marco Messeri as Bruyeres
- Ciccio Ingrassia as Pietro, Sigognac's servant
- Remo Girone as Vallombrosa
