= The Good, the Bad and the Ugly =

1966 film directed by Sergio Leone

- Theatrical re-release poster by Renato Casaro (Note: Attributed to multiple sources:)
- Italian: Il buono, il brutto, il cattivo
- Literally: The good, the ugly, the bad
- Directed by: Sergio Leone
- Screenplay by: Age & Scarpelli; Luciano Vincenzoni; Sergio Leone
- Story by: Luciano Vincenzoni; Sergio Leone
- Produced by: Alberto Grimaldi
- Starring: Clint Eastwood; Eli Wallach; Lee Van Cleef; Aldo Giuffrè; Antonio Casas; Rada Rassimov; Aldo Sambrell; Enzo Petito; Luigi Pistilli; Livio Lorenzon; Al Mulock; Sergio Mendizábal; Antonio Molino Rojo; Lorenzo Robledo; Mario Brega
- Cinematography: Tonino Delli Colli
- Edited by: Nino Baragli; Eugenio Alabiso
- Music by: Ennio Morricone
- Production company: PEA
- Distributed by: PEA
- Release date: December 23, 1966
- Running time: 174 minutes
- Country: Italy (Note: Attributed to multiple sources:)
- Languages: English; Italian; Spanish
- Budget: $1.2 million
- Box office: $38.9 million

The Good, the Bad and the Ugly (Italian: Il buono, il brutto, il cattivo, lit. 'The good, the ugly, the bad') is a 1966 Italian epic spaghetti Western film directed by Sergio Leone and starring Clint Eastwood as "the Good", Lee Van Cleef as "the Bad", and Eli Wallach as "the Ugly". Its screenplay was written by Age & Scarpelli, Luciano Vincenzoni, and Leone, based on a story by Vincenzoni and Leone. Director of photography Tonino Delli Colli was responsible for the film's sweeping Techniscope cinematography, and Ennio Morricone composed the film's score.

The film is known for Leone's distinctive visual style, characterized by the juxtaposition of expansive wide shots and extreme close-ups, as well as a highly stylised treatment of violence, tension, and gunfights. Although an Italian production, it was filmed primarily in Spain, particularly in the Tabernas Desert in Almería, the Arlanza River valley near Hortigüela, and at the purpose-built Sad Hill Cemetery near Santo Domingo de Silos. Set against the backdrop of the American Civil War, the story follows three gunslingers who form shifting alliances and betrayals in their search for a buried cache of Confederate gold amid the chaos of the conflict. The film marked Leone's third collaboration with Eastwood and his second with Van Cleef.

Released in Italy on December 23, 1966, The Good, the Bad and the Ugly was subsequently distributed internationally and promoted in the United States as the third and final installment of the Dollars Trilogy, following A Fistful of Dollars (1964) and For a Few Dollars More (1965), although the three films are connected thematically rather than through a continuous narrative. Building on the growing international popularity of Leone and Eastwood, the film achieved major commercial success, grossing over $38 million worldwide against a production budget of approximately $1.2 million and becoming one of the most financially successful European Westerns of its time.

Initial critical reception in some markets was mixed, reflecting the broader skepticism then directed toward the spaghetti Western genre, which was often criticized for its stylisation, violence, and moral ambiguity in contrast to traditional Hollywood Westerns. Over time, however, the film underwent extensive critical re-evaluation and developed a strong cult following, aided by television screenings, home media releases, and later restoration efforts. It has since been widely recognized for its operatic scale, visual composition, editing, and the iconic score by Morricone. Frequently cited as one of the greatest and most influential Western films of all time, it has had a lasting impact on filmmakers and has been referenced and parodied across popular culture, including in films, television, comic books, and video games.

== Plot ==
In the American Southwest during the Civil War, a mercenary known as "Angel Eyes" interrogates a former Confederate soldier, Stevens, to learn the alias of a man who stole a stash of Confederate gold. Stevens reveals the man's alias, Bill Carson, and attempts to bribe Angel Eyes to kill his employer before drawing on him. Angel Eyes kills him and, returning to his employer, kills him as well.

Mexican bandit Tuco Ramírez, fleeing from bounty hunters, is captured by an unnamed drifter he nicknames "Blondie", who delivers him to a sheriff and collects the bounty. As Tuco is about to be hanged, Blondie severs the noose with a rifle bullet and the two escape to split the bounty. They repeat the process in another town but Blondie grows weary of Tuco's complaints, keeps the money, and strands Tuco in the desert.

Bent on revenge, Tuco reassembles his gang and tracks down Blondie. Although his gang dies during the ambush, Tuco captures Blondie in his hotel room and prepares to hang him. An artillery round destroys the room, allowing Blondie to escape. After a lengthy pursuit, Tuco recaptures Blondie and force-marches him through the desert until he collapses from dehydration. A runaway ambulance arrives with several dead Confederate soldiers and a barely alive Bill Carson. Near death, Carson begs Tuco for help, offering $200,000 in gold buried in Sad Hill Cemetery. When Tuco returns with water, Carson has died, having revealed the exact grave in which the gold is hidden to Blondie.

The two reluctantly agree to work together, but refuse to share what they each know of the gold's location. They pose as Confederate soldiers at a mission while Blondie recovers and Tuco reunites with his brother, a priest, who rejects Tuco. They leave the mission and are taken prisoner by Union cavalry. At a prison camp, Tuco gives the name Bill Carson and alerts Angel Eyes, who has infiltrated the camp as a Union sergeant. Tuco is tortured into revealing the cemetery's name and sent away to be hanged. Knowing torture will not work on Blondie, Angel Eyes recruits him. Tuco escapes from custody and tracks Angel Eyes' gang to a ghost town.

Distrusting Angel Eyes, Blondie finds Tuco and kills the gang members, but Angel Eyes escapes. Tuco and Blondie witness a battle over a strategic bridge they need to cross, and blow it up to disperse the armies and clear their path. As they wire the bridge with explosives, Tuco suggests they exchange their secrets in case either is killed. Tuco reveals the cemetery's name, and Blondie says "Arch Stanton" is the name on the grave.

After the bridge is demolished, Tuco rushes towards Sad Hill to claim the gold for himself. Blondie catches up with him as he digs up the grave, where Angel Eyes also appears. Blondie reveals there is no gold in the grave, and that he lied about the name. He then places a stone in the middle of the cemetery's grounds, on which he says the true name is written. The three men face each other in a Mexican stand-off. They all draw, but Blondie shoots and wounds Angel Eyes. Tuco realises his gun is empty, Blondie having removed the bullets the previous night. Angel Eyes attempts to shoot Blondie again, but the latter shoots him in the head, knocking his corpse into an open grave.

Blondie reveals that the gold is in the grave next to Stanton's marked "Unknown". After Tuco digs up several large bags of gold, Blondie orders him at gunpoint into a hangman's noose. With hands bound, Tuco stands atop a rickety grave marker while Blondie takes half the gold and rides away. As Tuco cries for mercy, Blondie severs the rope with a rifle shot, dropping Tuco face-first onto the remaining gold alive. Blondie smiles and rides away over the hills as Tuco furiously curses him.

== Cast ==
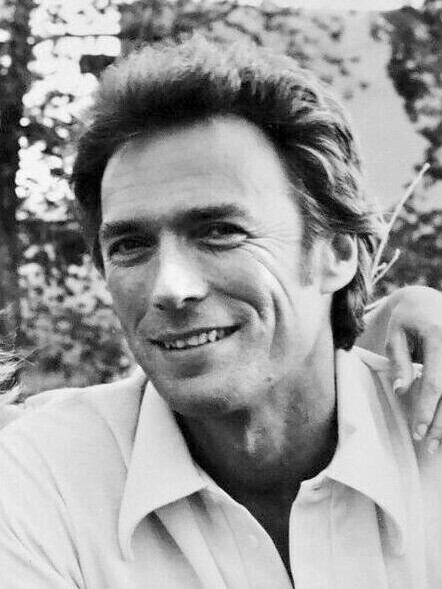
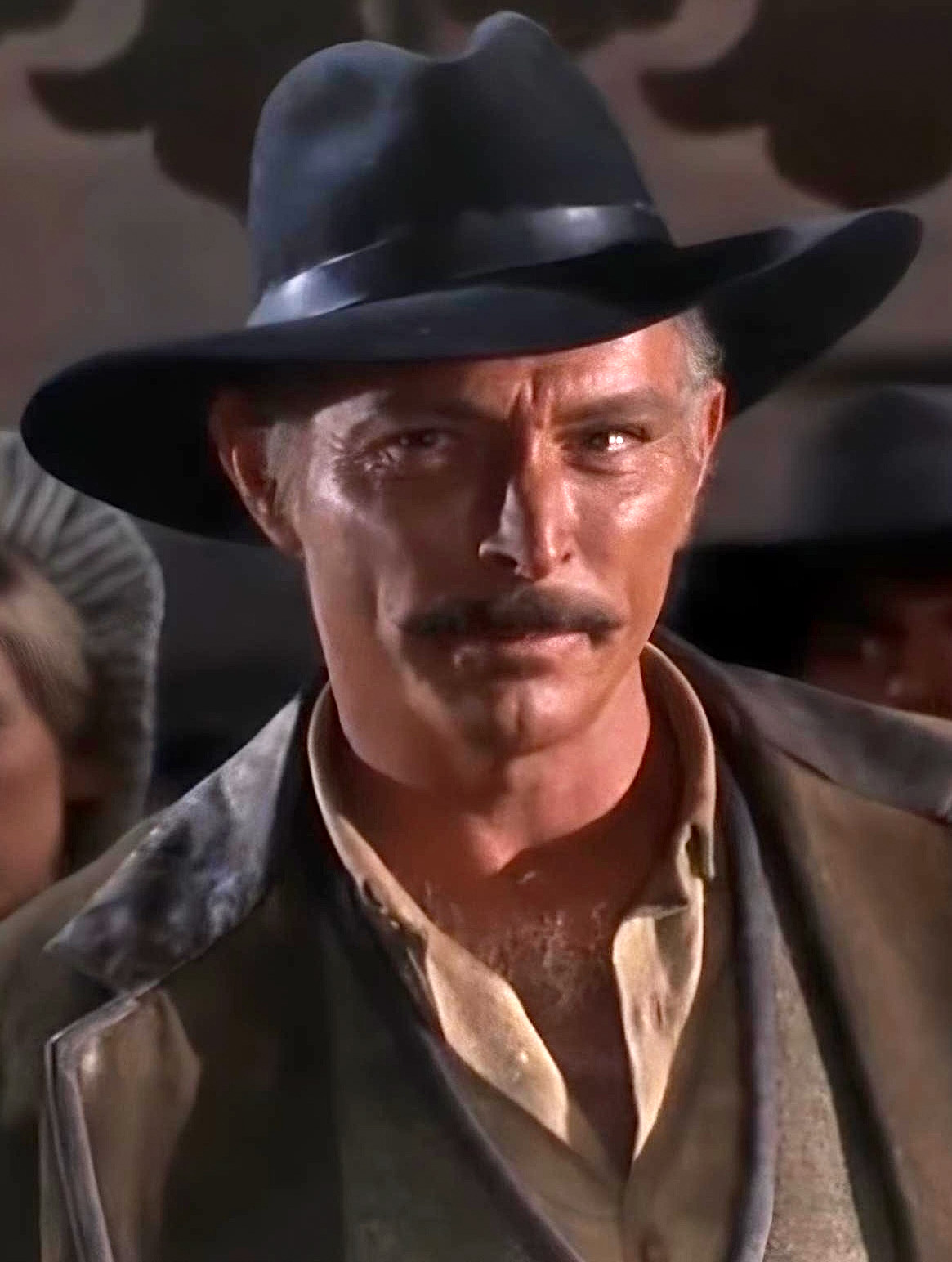
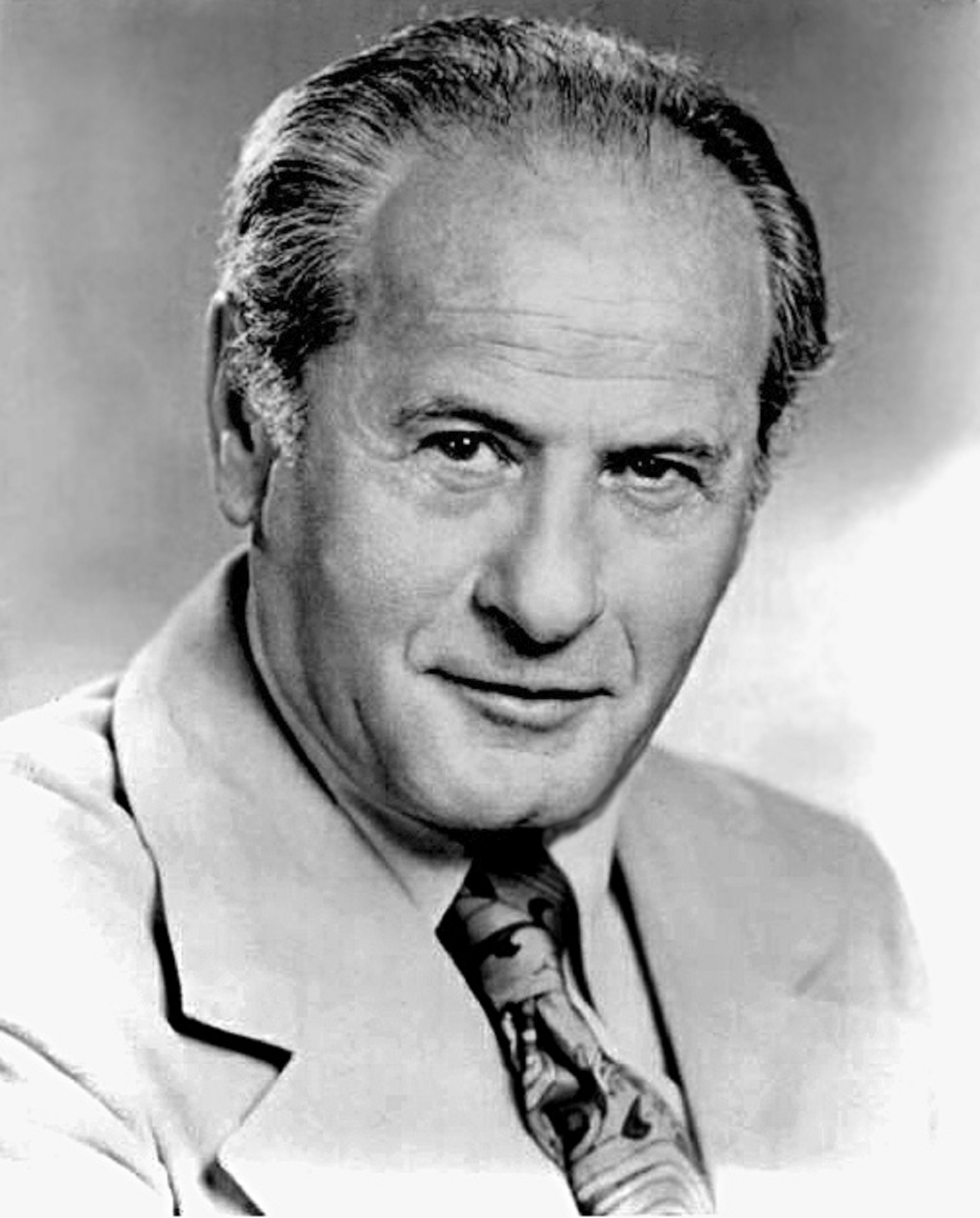
(Left to right) Clint Eastwood (pictured in 1976), Lee Van Cleef (1967), and Eli Wallach (1966).

=== The trio ===
- Clint Eastwood as 'Blondie' (the Man with No Name): The Good, a taciturn, confident bounty hunter who, to find buried gold, temporarily teams up with Tuco and Angel Eyes. Blondie and Tuco have an ambivalent partnership. Tuco knows the name of the cemetery where the gold is hidden, but Blondie knows the name of the grave where it is buried, forcing them to work together to find the treasure. Despite this greedy quest, Blondie's pity for the dying soldiers in the chaotic carnage of the war is evident. "I've never seen so many men wasted so badly", he remarks. He also comforts a dying soldier by laying his coat over him and letting him smoke his cigarillo.
- Lee Van Cleef as 'Angel Eyes': The Bad, a ruthless, confident, sadistic mercenary who takes pleasure in killing and always finishes a job for which he is paid, usually tracking and assassination.
- Eli Wallach as Tuco Benedicto Pacífico Juan María Ramírez (known as "The Rat" according to Blondie): The Ugly, a fast-talking, comically oafish yet also cunning, cagey, resilient, and resourceful Mexican bandit who is wanted by the authorities for a long list of crimes.

=== Supporting cast ===
- Aldo Giuffrè as alcoholic Union Captain Clinton
- Antonio Casas as Stevens
- Rada Rassimov as María
- Aldo Sambrell as a member of Angel Eyes' gang
- Enzo Petito as the gun shop owner
- Luigi Pistilli as Father Pablo Ramírez, Tuco's brother
- Livio Lorenzon as Baker
- Al Mulock as Elam, a one-armed bounty hunter
- Sergio Mendizábal as a blonde bounty hunter
- Antonio Molino Rojo as Captain Harper, prison camp commander
- Lorenzo Robledo as Clem, a member of Angel Eyes' gang
- Mario Brega as Corporal Wallace
- Claudio Scarchilli as Pedro, Mexican peon
- Antonio Casale as Jackson / Bill Carson
- Sandro Scarchilli as Chico, Mexican peon
- Benito Stefanelli as a member of Angel Eyes' gang
- Angelo Novi as a friar

== Production ==
=== Pre-production ===
After the success of For a Few Dollars More (1965), executives at American distribution company United Artists approached the film's screenwriter, Luciano Vincenzoni, to sign a contract for the rights to the film and the production of its sequel. Along with producer Alberto Grimaldi and Sergio Leone, Vincenzoni pitched an idea about "a film about three rogues who are looking for some treasure at the time of the American Civil War". An agreement was struck with United Artists for a million-dollar budget, with the studio advancing $500,000 up front and 50% of the box-office takings outside of Italy. The total budget was eventually increased to $1.2 million. (Note: The 1966 budget of $1.2 million is equivalent to $11.9 million in 2025.) (Note: Attributed to multiple sources:)

As Leone developed Vincenzoni's idea into a script, he built upon the screenwriter's original concept to "show the absurdity of war... the Civil War, which the characters encounter. In my frame of reference, it is useless, stupid: it does not involve a 'good cause'," saying, "I had read somewhere that 120,000 people died in Southern camps such as Andersonville. Many shots in the film were influenced by archival Civil War photographs taken by Mathew Brady and Alexander Gardner. As the film took place during the Civil War, it served as a prequel for the other two films in the trilogy, which took place after the war. The three main characters all contain autobiographical elements of Leone. Sergio Donati contributed additional screenplay material and dialogue, although he did not receive screen credit.

Film director Alex Cox suggested that the cemetery-buried gold hunted by the protagonists may have been inspired by rumors surrounding the anti-Communist Gladio organization, who hid many of their 138 weapons caches in cemeteries.

The film's working title was I due magnifici straccioni (The Two Magnificent Tramps). It was changed just before shooting began, when Vincenzoni thought of Il buono, il brutto, il cattivo (The Good, the Ugly, the Bad), which Leone loved. In the United States, United Artists considered using the original Italian translation, River of Dollars, or The Man With No Name, but decided on The Good, the Bad and the Ugly.

=== Casting ===
After Leone offered Clint Eastwood a role in his next movie, traveling to California to persuade him, Eastwood agreed to make the film, playing Blondie, upon being paid $250,000 and receiving 10 percent of the profits from the North American markets—a deal with which Leone was not happy.

The director originally considered Gian Maria Volonté (who portrayed the villains in both the preceding films) for the role of Tuco, but felt that the role required someone with "natural comic talent". In the end, Leone chose Eli Wallach, based on his role in the "Railroads" scene of How the West Was Won (1962). Upon meeting Leone, Wallach was skeptical about playing this type of character again, but immediately agreed after Leone screened the opening credit sequence from For a Few Dollars More. The two men got along well, sharing the same bizarre sense of humor. Leone allowed Wallach to make changes to his character in terms of his outfit and recurring gestures. Both Eastwood and Van Cleef realized that the character of Tuco was close to Leone's heart. They communicated in French, which Wallach spoke badly and Leone spoke well. Van Cleef observed, "Tuco is the only one of the trio the audience gets to know all about. We meet his brother and find out where he came from and why he became a bandit."

For the role of Angel Eyes, Leone originally wanted Enrico Maria Salerno (who had dubbed Eastwood's voice for the Italian versions of the Dollars Trilogy films) or Charles Bronson, but the latter was already committed to playing in The Dirty Dozen (1967). Leone eventually wished to work with Lee Van Cleef again, saying, "I said to myself that Van Cleef had first played a romantic character in For a Few Dollars More. The idea of getting him to play a character who was the opposite of that began to appeal to me."

=== Filming ===
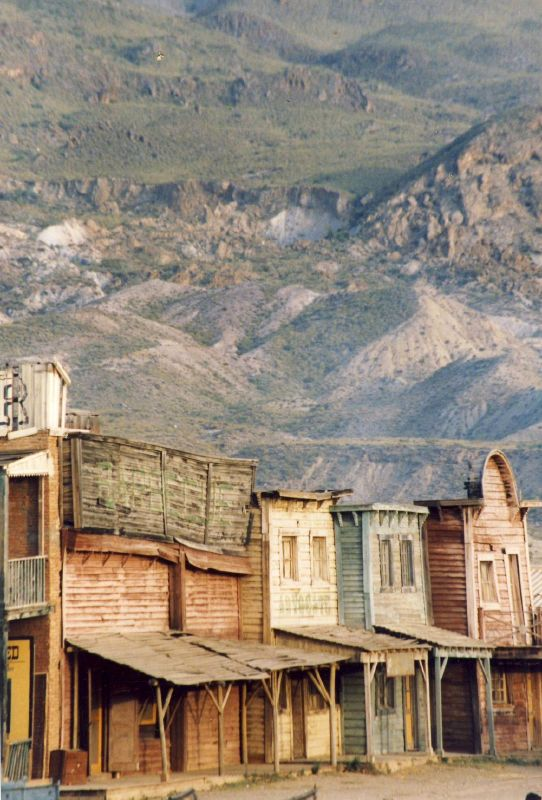
Set of The Good, the Bad and the Ugly with the distinctive rugged terrain in the background.

The iconic Mexican stand-off, with Tuco seen on the left, Angel Eyes in the middle, and Blondie on the right. The scene is accompanied by Ennio Morricone's "The Trio".

Production began at the Cinecittà Studios in Rome mid-May 1966. It then moved on to Spain's northern plateau region near Burgos, which doubled for the Southwestern United States, and again in southern Spain's Almería. The production required elaborate sets, including a town under cannon fire, an extensive prison camp, and an American Civil War battlefield; for the climax, several hundred Spanish soldiers were employed to build a cemetery—Sad Hill—with several thousand gravestones and wooden crosses to resemble an ancient Roman circus. A scene where a bridge was blown up had to be filmed twice because the explosion destroyed all three cameras in the first take.

Italian cinematographer Tonino Delli Colli was brought in to shoot the film and was prompted by Leone to pay more attention to lighting than in the previous two films. The score was once again composed by Ennio Morricone, and for the final Mexican stand-off scene in the cemetery, Leone asked Morricone to compose what felt like "the corpses were laughing from inside their tombs". Filming concluded in July 1966.

Eastwood was displeased with the script and was concerned he might be upstaged by Wallach. "In the first film, I was alone," he told Leone. "In the second, we were two. Here we are three. If it goes on this way, in the next one I will be starring with the American cavalry." As Eastwood played hard-to-get in accepting the role (inflating his earnings up to $250,000, two Ferraris, and 10% of the profits in the United States when eventually released there), he was again encountering publicist disputes between Ruth Marsh, who urged him to accept the third film of the trilogy, and the William Morris Agency and Irving Leonard, who were unhappy with Marsh's influence on the actor. Eastwood banished Marsh from having any further influence in his career, and he fired her as his business manager.

Wallach and Eastwood flew to Madrid together, and between shooting scenes, Eastwood would relax and practice his golf swing. Wallach was almost poisoned during filming when he accidentally drank from a bottle of acid that a film technician had set next to his soda bottle. Wallach mentioned this in his autobiography and complained that while Leone was a brilliant director, he was very lax about ensuring the safety of his actors during dangerous scenes. For instance, in one scene, where he was to be hanged after a pistol was fired, the horse underneath him was supposed to bolt. While the rope around Wallach's neck was severed, the horse was frightened a little too well. It galloped for about a mile with Wallach still mounted and his hands bound behind his back. The third time Wallach's life was threatened was during the scene where he and Mario Brega—who are chained together—jump out of a moving train. The jumping part went as planned, but Wallach's life was endangered when his character attempted to sever the chain binding him to the (now dead) soldier. Tuco placed the body on the railroad tracks, waiting for the train to roll over the chain and sever it. Wallach, and presumably the entire film crew, were not aware of the heavy iron steps that jutted one foot out of every box car. If Wallach had stood up from his prone position at the wrong time, one of the jutting steps could have decapitated him.

The bridge in the film was constructed twice by sappers of the Spanish army and rigged for on-camera explosive demolition. On the first occasion, an Italian camera operator signaled that he was ready to shoot, which was misconstrued by an army captain as the similar-sounding Spanish word meaning "start". Nobody was injured in the resulting explosion. The army rebuilt the bridge while other shots were filmed. As the bridge was not a prop, but a rather heavy and sturdy functional structure, powerful explosives were required to destroy it. Leone said that this scene was, in part, inspired by Buster Keaton's film The General (1926).

As an international cast was employed, actors performed in their native languages. (Note: The film was shot in three languages simultaneously: English, Italian, and Spanish. Later two partially dubbed versions were released: an Italian version (where English and Spanish dialogue were dubbed into Italian), and an English version (where Italian and Spanish dialogue were dubbed into English).) Eastwood, Van Cleef, and Wallach spoke English and were dubbed into Italian for their debut release in Rome. For the American version, the lead acting voices were used, but supporting cast members were dubbed into English. The result is noticeable in the bad synchronization of voices to lip movements on screen; none of the dialogue is completely in sync because Leone rarely shot his scenes with synchronized sound. Various reasons have been cited for this: Leone often liked to play Morricone's music over a scene and possibly shout things at the actors to get them in the mood. Leone cared more for visuals than dialogue (his English was limited at best). Given the technical limitations of the time, recording the sound cleanly would have been difficult in most of the extremely wide shots Leone frequently used. Also, it was standard practice in Italian films at this time to shoot silently and post-dub. Whatever the actual reason, all dialogue in the film was recorded in postproduction.

By the end of filming, Eastwood had finally had enough of Leone's perfectionist directorial traits. Leone insisted, often forcefully, on shooting scenes from many different angles, paying attention to the most minute of details, which often exhausted the actors. Leone, who was obese, prompted amusement through his excesses, and Eastwood found a way to deal with the stresses of being directed by him by making jokes about him and nicknamed him "Yosemite Sam" for his bad temper. After the film was completed, Eastwood never worked with Leone again, later turning down the role of Harmonica in Once Upon a Time in the West (1968), for which Leone had personally flown to Los Angeles to give him the script. The role eventually went to Charles Bronson. Years later, Leone exacted his revenge upon Eastwood during the filming of Once Upon a Time in America (1984) when he described Eastwood's abilities as an actor as being like a block of marble or wax and inferior to the acting abilities of Robert De Niro, saying, "Eastwood moves like a sleepwalker between explosions and hails of bullets, and he is always the same—a block of marble. Bobby [De Niro], first of all, is an actor, and Clint first of all is a star. Bobby suffers and Clint yawns." Eastwood later gave a friend the poncho he wore in the three films, and it was subsequently displayed in a Mexican restaurant in Carmel-by-the-Sea, California.

=== Cinematography ===
In its depiction of violence, Leone used his signature long drawn and close-up style of filming, which he did by mixing extreme face shots and sweeping long shots. By doing so, Leone managed to stage epic sequences punctuated by extreme eyes and face shots, or hands slowly reaching for a holstered gun. Leone also incorporated music to heighten the tension and pressure before and during the film's many gunfights.

In filming the pivotal gunfights, Leone largely removes dialogue to focus more on the actions of the characters, which was important during the film's iconic Mexican stand-off. This style can also be seen in one of the film's protagonists, Blondie (The Man with No Name), who is described by critics as more defined by his actions than his words. All three characters can be seen as anti-heroes, killing for their personal gain. Leone also employed trick shooting, such as Blondie shooting the hat off a person's head and severing a hangman's noose with a well-placed shot, in many of the film's noted shootouts.

== Themes ==
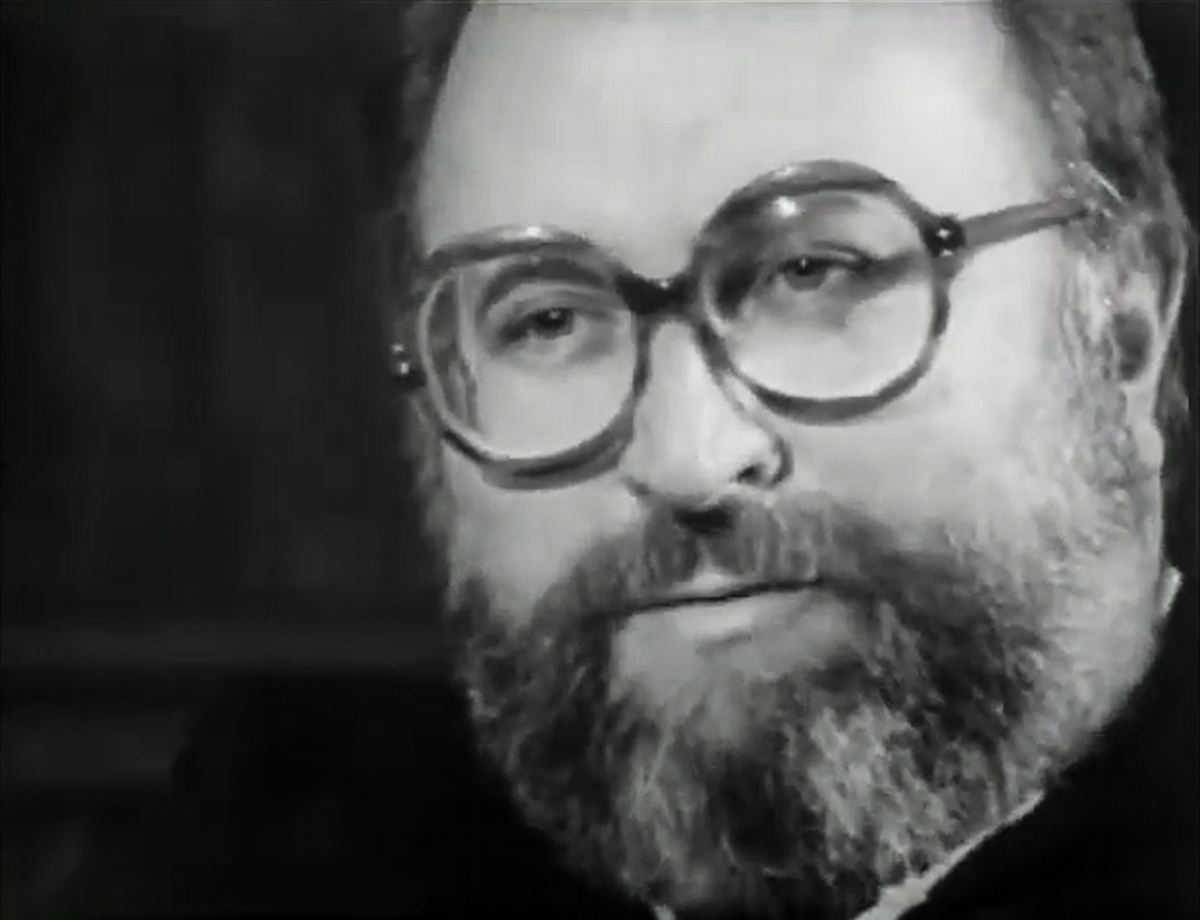
Sergio Leone, pictured in 1975.

Like many of his films, director Sergio Leone noted that the film is a satire of the western genre. He has noted the film's theme of emphasis on violence and the deconstruction of Old West romanticism. The emphasis on violence is seen in how the three leads (Blondie, Angel Eyes, and Tuco) are introduced to various acts of violence. With Blondie, it is seen in his attempt to free Tuco which results in a gun battle. Angel Eyes is set up in a scene in which he learns about hidden treasure from Stevens, kills Stevens when he draws on him, then his employer Baker (fulfilling his title as 'The Bad'). Tuco is set up in a scene in which three bounty hunters try to kill him. In the film's opening scene, three bounty hunters enter a building in which Tuco is hiding. After the sound of gunfire is heard, Tuco escapes through a window after shooting the three, one of whom survives (fulfilling his title as 'The Ugly'). They are all after gold and will stop at nothing until they get it. The film deconstructs Old West Romanticism by portraying the characters as antiheroes. Even the character considered by the film as 'The Good' can still be considered as not living up to that title in a moral sense. Critic Drew Marton describes it as a "baroque manipulation" that criticizes the American Ideology of the Western, by replacing the heroic cowboy popularised by John Wayne with morally complex antiheroes.

Negative themes such as cruelty and greed are also given focus and are traits shared by the three leads in the story. Cruelty is shown in the character of Blondie in how he treats Tuco throughout the film. He is seen to sometimes be friendly with him and in other scenes double-cross him and throw him to the side. It is shown in Angel Eyes through his attitudes in the film and his tendency for committing violent acts throughout the film. For example, when he kills Stevens he also kills his son. It is also seen when he is violently torturing Tuco later in the film. It is shown in Tuco how he shows concern for Blondie when he is heavily dehydrated but in truth, he is only keeping him alive to find the gold. It is also shown in his conversation with his brother which reveals that a life of cruelty is all he knows. Richard Aquila writes "The violent antiheroes of Italian westerns also fit into a folk tradition in southern Italy that honored mafioso and vigilante who used any means to combat corrupt government or church officials who threatened the peasants of the Mezzogiorno".

Greed is shown in the film through its main core plotline of the three characters wanting to find the $200,000—equivalent to $6.45 million in 2025—that Bill Carson has said is buried in a grave in Sad Hill Cemetery. The main plot concerns their greed as there is a series of double crossings and changing allegiances to get the gold. Russ Hunter writes that the film will "stress the formation of homosocial relationships as being functional only in the pursuit of wealth".

Many critics have also noticed the film's anti-war theme. Taking place in the American Civil War, the film takes the viewpoint of people such as civilians, bandits, and most notably soldiers, and presents their daily hardships during the war. This is seen in the film's rugged and rough aesthetic. The film has an air of dirtiness that can be attributed to the Civil War and in turn, it affects the actions of people, showing how the war deep down has affected the lives of many people. A scene presents Angel Eyes arriving in an embattled Confederate outpost. Angel Eyes shows compassion towards the agonizing soldiers, pointing out that even 'The Bad' is shocked by the horrors of the war.

Although not fighting in the war, the three gunslingers gradually become entangled in the battles that ensue (similar to The Great War, a film that screenwriters Luciano Vincenzoni and Age & Scarpelli had contributed to). An example of this is how Tuco and Blondie blow up a bridge to disperse two sides of the battle. They need to clear a way to the cemetery and succeed in doing so. It is also seen in how Angel Eyes disguises himself as a union sergeant so he can attack and torture Tuco to get the information he needs, intertwining himself in the battle in the process.

== Music ==
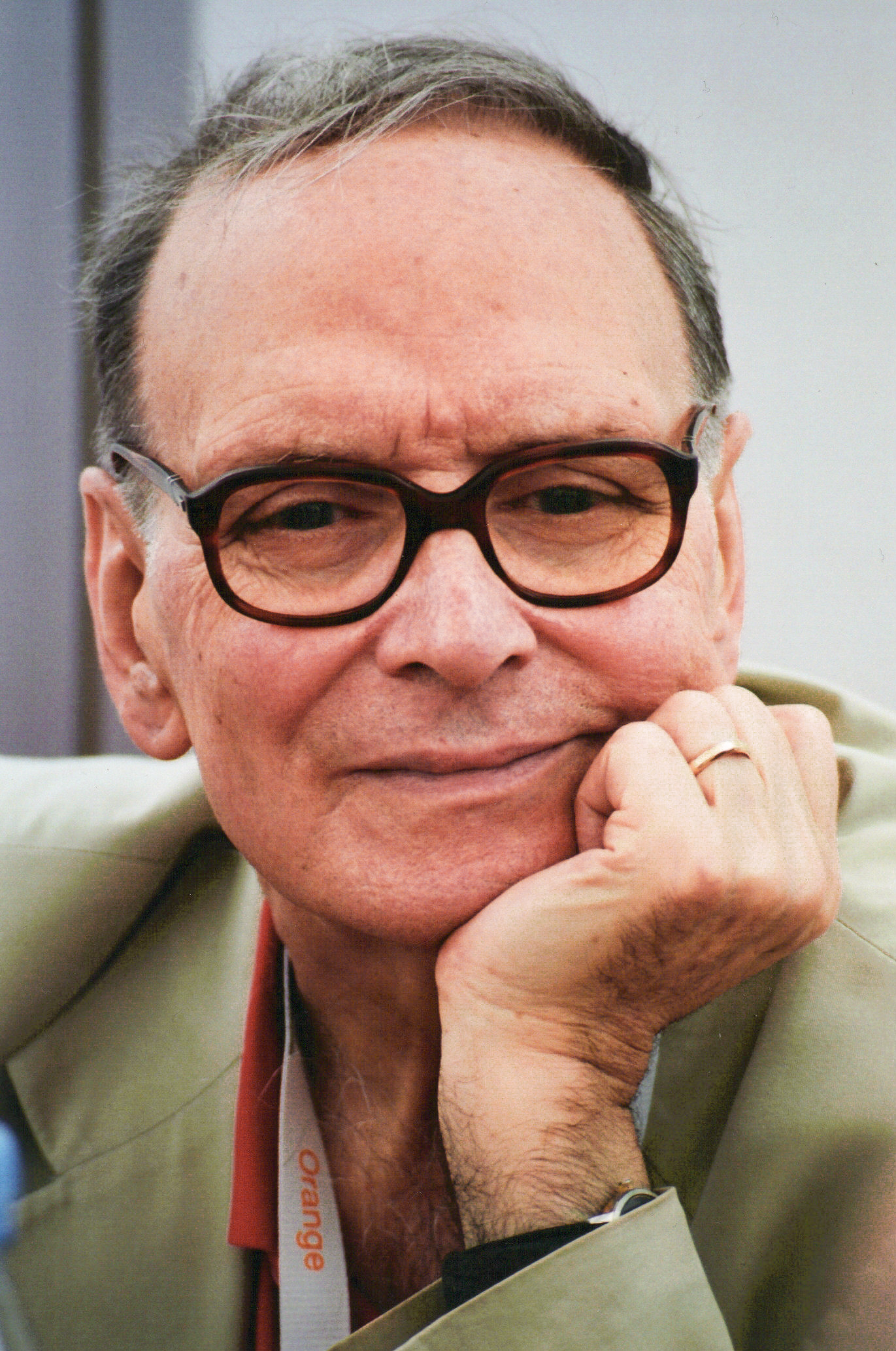
The score, composed by Ennio Morricone (pictured in 2007), was inducted into the Grammy Hall of Fame in 2009.

The Good, the Bad and the Ugly main theme
From The Good, the Bad and the Ugly soundtrack by Ennio Morricone

The score was composed by frequent Leone collaborator Ennio Morricone. For this film, Leone and Morricone departed from their previous working method by developing the principal themes before filming began. This approach allowed the music to shape the film's rhythm and atmosphere, with Leone often playing the compositions on set and staging camera movements and editing patterns to match the score.

Morricone employed an unconventional orchestral palette that blended traditional instrumentation with distinctive sound effects, including gunfire, whistling by Alessandro Alessandroni, and vocalizations. The soprano voice of Edda Dell'Orso features prominently in compositions such as "The Ecstasy of Gold". Guitarist Bruno Battisti D'Amario contributed to tracks including "The Sundown" and "Padre Ramirez", while trumpet players Michele Lacerenza and Francesco Catania performed on "The Trio".

The main theme is built around a two-note motif designed to evoke the howl of a coyote, which is heard over the film's opening images. The motif functions as a leitmotif for the three protagonists, each represented by a different timbre: flute for Blondie, ocarina for Angel Eyes, and human voices for Tuco.

The score also reinforces the film's Civil War setting. The only vocal song, "The Story of a Soldier", with lyrics by Tommie Connor, is performed diegetically by prisoners of war during Tuco's torture sequence. The film's climactic three-way stand-off is structured musically, beginning with "The Ecstasy of Gold" and culminating in "The Trio", which incorporates thematic material recalling Morricone's work on For a Few Dollars More (1965).

The soundtrack was a commercial success. Released in 1968, it remained on the Billboard album charts for more than a year, reaching No. 4 on the pop chart and No. 10 on the Black Albums chart. A cover version of the main theme by Hugo Montenegro reached No. 2 on the Billboard Hot 100.

=== In popular culture ===
"The Ecstasy of Gold" has been widely used in live performance and media. Since 1985, American heavy metal band Metallica has used the piece as introductory music for its concerts and recorded a version for a tribute album to Morricone. The theme and its distinctive vocal motif have also been sampled or referenced by artists across genres, including hip hop and electronic music, and are frequently used in sporting and broadcast contexts.

The main theme has been performed or adapted by various rock and alternative artists, including the Ramones and Motörhead, and has been sampled in recordings by acts such as Bomb the Bass, Big Audio Dynamite, and New Order. The score's influence extends to contemporary popular music; the opening vocal motif is referenced in the video for the Gorillaz song "Clint Eastwood".

== Release ==
=== Theatrical ===
The Good, the Bad and the Ugly was released in Italy on December 23, 1966, by Produzioni Europee Associati (PEA). (Note: Attributed to multiple sources:) In the United States, all three of Leone's Dollars Trilogy films were released in 1967 by United Artists: A Fistful of Dollars on January 18; For a Few Dollars More on May 10; and The Good, the Bad and the Ugly on December 29. The Italian premiere version was 177 minutes long. Shortly afterward, Leone removed a sequence known as the "grotto" scene, reducing the running time to 174 minutes; this version was distributed in Italian cinemas. The international version was shown at various lengths; most prints, specifically those shown in the United States, had a runtime of 161 minutes, but others, especially British prints, ran as short as 148 minutes. Later home video releases restored the longer versions, presenting both the 177-minute cut and the 174-minute version without the "grotto" scene.

Eastwood did a month-long publicity tour for the film, which also garnered popularity through advertising and word of mouth.

=== Home media ===
On January 28, 1998, the film was released on DVD by MGM Home Video. Its release from MGM contained 14 minutes of scenes that were cut from the film's North American release. In 2002, the film was restored with the 14 minutes of scenes cut for US release re-inserted into the film. Clint Eastwood and Eli Wallach were brought back in to dub their characters' lines more than 35 years after the film's original release. Voice actor Simon Prescott substituted for Lee Van Cleef, who had died in 1989, and other voice actors filled in for since deceased actors. In 2004, MGM released this version in a two-disc special edition DVD.

Disc 1 contains an audio commentary with film writer and critic Richard Schickel. Disc 2 contained two documentaries, "Leone's West" and "The Man Who Lost The Civil War", followed by the featurette "Restoring 'The Good, the Bad, and the Ugly'"; an animated gallery of missing sequences titled "The Socorro Sequence: A Reconstruction"; an extended Tuco torture scene; a featurette called "Il Maestro"; an audio featurette named "Il Maestro, Part 2"; a French trailer; and a poster gallery.

This DVD was generally well received, though some purists complained about the re-mixed stereo soundtrack with many completely new sound effects (notably, the gunshots were replaced), with no option for the original soundtrack. At least one scene that was re-inserted had been cut by Leone before the film's release in Italy but had been shown once at the Italian premiere. According to Richard Schickel, Leone willingly cut the scene for pacing reasons; thus, restoring it was contrary to the director's wishes. MGM re-released the 2004 DVD edition in their "Sergio Leone Anthology" box set in 2007. Also included were the two other "Dollars" films, and Duck, You Sucker!. On May 12, 2009, the extended version of the film was released on Blu-ray. It contains the same special features as the 2004 special edition DVD, except that it includes an added commentary by film historian Sir Christopher Frayling.

The film was re-released on Blu-ray in 2014 using a new 4K remaster, featuring improved picture quality and detail but a change of color timing, resulting in the film having a more yellow hue than on previous releases. It was re-released on Blu-ray and DVD by Kino Lorber Studio Classics on August 15, 2017, in a new 50th Anniversary release that featured an attempt to correct the yellow color timing from the earlier disc. Though some fans complained that their efforts actually worsened the look of the master. Despite their 2017 release claiming to have both the theatrical and extended cuts, it was in fact determined that their theatrical cut disc was flawed and not only was missing shots, but also had additional shots not intended to be in the theatrical cut. On April 27, 2021, Kino released an Ultra HD Blu-ray, this time containing the correct theatrical cut, once again using the same master from the 2014 Blu-ray, but with extensive and more proper color correction. However, due to being too costly, the extended version was dropped from this release but the extra scenes were included as a special feature.

In 2025, Arrow Video released all three Dollars movies in remastered 4K transfers in the United Kingdom. Using the same base scans that created the masters on Kino's releases, they were able to create entirely new masters featuring HDR grading and newly restored mono tracks. In addition to a new fully restored versions of the theatrical and extended cuts, they also created multiple variants of the extended cut, which you can either watch it with or without the "grotto" scene and with or without the uncut Tuco torture scene (restored from a 35 mm print). Also included is a version that integrates deleted close ups of Angel Eyes whenever he first arrives at Stevens' house and another deleted scene where Blondie finds bones in the desert whenever he's being tortured by Tuco. But despite Arrow being able to include the theatrical and multiple variants of the extended cut, they were not able to include the original Italian cut or the Italian dub due to rights issues with the Italian rights holders. However, they were able to include the Italian specific moments as supplemental features.

==== Deleted scenes ====
The following scenes were originally deleted by distributors from the British and American theatrical versions of the film but were restored after the release of the 2004 Special Edition DVD.

- During his search for Bill Carson, Angel Eyes stumbles upon an embattled Confederate outpost after a massive artillery bombardment. Once there, after witnessing the wretched conditions of the survivors, he bribes a Confederate soldier (Víctor Israel, dubbed by Tom Wyner) for clues about Bill Carson.
- After being betrayed by Blondie, surviving the desert on his way to civilization, and assembling a good revolver from the parts of worn-out guns being sold at a general store, Tuco meets with members of his gang in a distant cave, where he conspires with them to hunt and kill Blondie.
- The sequence with Tuco and Blondie crossing the desert has been extended: Tuco mentally tortures a severely dehydrated Blondie by eating and bathing in front of him.
- Tuco, transporting a dehydrated Blondie, finds a Confederate camp whose occupants tell him that Father Ramírez's monastery is nearby.
- Tuco and Blondie discuss their plans when departing in a wagon from Father Ramírez's monastery.
- A scene where Blondie and Angel Eyes are resting by a creek when a man appears and Blondie shoots him. Angel Eyes asks the rest of his men to come out of hiding. When the five men come out, Blondie counts them (including Angel Eyes), and concludes that six is the perfect number, implying one for each bullet in his gun.
- The sequence with Tuco, Blondie, and Captain Clinton has been extended: Clinton asks for their names, which they are reluctant to give.

The footage below is all featured within supplementary features of the 2004 DVD release

- Additional footage of the sequence where Tuco is tortured by Angel Eyes's henchman was discovered. The original negative of this footage was deemed too badly damaged to be used in the theatrical cut.
- Lost footage of the missing Socorro Sequence where Tuco continues his search for Blondie in a Texican pueblo while Blondie is in a hotel room with a Mexican woman (Silvana Bacci) is reconstructed with photos and unfinished snippets from the French trailer. Also, in the documentary "Reconstructing The Good, the Bad, and the Ugly", what looks to be footage of Tuco lighting cannons before the Ecstasy of the Gold sequence appears briefly. None of these scenes or sequences appear in the 2004 re-release but are featured in the supplementary features.

== Reception ==
=== Box office ===
In Italy, the film grossed $6.3 million at the time, and was the second-highest-grossing release of the 1966–67 film season. In the United States and Canada, the film grossed $25.1 million. It also grossed $7.5 million in other international territories, for a total of $38.9 million grossed worldwide. (Note: The 1966 box office gross of $38.9 million is equivalent to $386 million in 2025.)

=== Critical response ===
On the review aggregator website Rotten Tomatoes, 99% of 73 critics' reviews are positive, with an average rating of 9.2/10. The website's consensus reads: "Arguably the greatest of the spaghetti westerns, this epic features a compelling story, memorable performances, breathtaking landscapes, and a haunting score." Metacritic, which uses a weighted average, assigned the film a score of 90 out of 100, based on 7 critics, indicating "universal acclaim".

Upon release, The Good, the Bad and the Ugly received criticism for its depiction of violence. Leone explains that "the killings in my films are exaggerated because I wanted to make a tongue-in-cheek satire on run-of-the-mill westerns... The west was made by violent, uncomplicated men, and it is this strength and simplicity that I try to recapture in my pictures." To this day, Leone's effort to reinvigorate the timeworn Western is widely acknowledged. Furthermore, individual critics attacked the movie for its violence and the fact it was a "spaghetti Western". In a negative review in The New York Times, Renata Adler said that the film "must be the most expensive, pious and repellent movie in the history of its peculiar genre." Charles Champlin of the Los Angeles Times wrote that the "temptation is hereby proved irresistible to call The Good, The Bad and the Ugly, now playing citywide, The Bad, The Dull, and the Interminable, only because it is." Roger Ebert, who later included the film in his list of Great Movies, retrospectively noted that in his original review he had "described a four-star movie, but only gave it three stars, perhaps because it was a 'spaghetti Western' and so could not be art." He would retrospectively give the movie a full four star rating.

== Legacy ==
=== Re-evaluation ===
Despite the initial negative reception by some critics, the film has since accumulated very positive feedback. It is listed in Time's "100 Greatest Movies of the Last Century" as selected by critics Richard Corliss and Richard Schickel. The Good, the Bad and the Ugly has been described as European cinema's best Western, and Quentin Tarantino has called it "the best-directed film of all time" and "the greatest achievement in the history of cinema". This was reflected in his votes for the 2002 and 2012 Sight & Sound magazine polls, in which he voted for The Good, the Bad and the Ugly as his choice for the best film ever made. Its main theme from the soundtrack is regarded by Classic FM as one of the most iconic themes of all time. Variety magazine ranked the film number 49 on their list of the 50 greatest movies. In 2002, Film4 held a poll of the 100 Greatest Movies, on which The Good, the Bad and the Ugly was voted in at number 46. Premiere magazine included the film on their 100 Most Daring Movies Ever Made list. Mr. Showbiz ranked the film #81 on its 100 Best Movies of All Time list.

Empire magazine added The Good, the Bad and the Ugly to their Masterpiece collection in the September 2007 issue, and their poll of "The 500 Greatest Movies", The Good, the Bad and the Ugly was voted in at number 25. In 2014, The Good the Bad and the Ugly was ranked the 47th greatest film ever made on Empire's list of "The 301 Greatest Movies Of All Time" as voted by the magazine's readers. It was also placed on a similar list of 1000 movies by The New York Times. In 2014, Time Out polled several film critics, directors, actors and stunt actors to list their top action films. The Good, The Bad and the Ugly placed 52nd on their list. An article on the BBC website considers the 'lasting legacy of the film, and describes the trio scene as "one of the most riveting and acclaimed feature films sequences of all time".

=== In popular culture ===
The film has had a significant effect on popular culture, being frequently referred to as a cult film. The film's title has entered the English language as an idiomatic expression. Typically used when describing something thoroughly, the respective phrases refer to upsides, downsides, and the parts that could, or should have been done better, but were not.

Quentin Tarantino paid homage to the film's climactic stand-off scene in his 1992 film Reservoir Dogs.

The film was novelized in 1967 by Joe Millard as part of the "Dollars Western" series based on the "Man with No Name". The South Korean western movie The Good, the Bad, the Weird (2008) is inspired by the film, with much of its plot and character elements borrowed from Leone's film. In his introduction to the 2003 revised edition of his novel The Dark Tower: The Gunslinger, Stephen King said the film was a primary influence for the Dark Tower series, with Eastwood's character inspiring the creation of King's protagonist, Roland Deschain.

In 1975, Willie Colón with Yomo Toro and Hector Lavoe, released an album titled The Good, the Bad, the Ugly. The album cover featured the three in cowboy attire.

=== Impact on Western genre ===
While the Dollars Trilogy was not the beginning of the so-called spaghetti Western cycle in Italy, many in the US saw it as the beginning of an Italian invasion of the most recognisably American film genre. Christopher Frayling argues that, on the whole, Americans had become "bored with an exhausted Hollywood genre". He notes that Pauline Kael, for example, had appreciated how non-American films of the time "could exploit the conventions of the Western genre, while debunking its morality". Along with Peter Bondanella and others, Frayling argues that such revisionism was the key to Leone's success and, to some degree, to that of the spaghetti Western genre as a whole. The Good, the Bad and the Ugly, like the later Once Upon a Time in the West (1968), belongs to multiple Western sub-genres: Epic Western, Outlaw (Gunfighter) Film, Revisionist Western and spaghetti Western.

The Good, the Bad and the Ugly has been called the definitive spaghetti Western – colloquially, these are Westerns produced and directed by Italians, often in collaboration with other European countries, especially Spain and West Germany. The name 'spaghetti Western' originally was a pejorative term, given by foreign critics to these films because they thought they were inferior to American westerns. Most of the films were made with low budgets, but several still managed to be innovative and artistic, although at the time they did not get much recognition, even in Europe. The genre is unmistakably a Catholic genre, with a visual style strongly influenced by the Catholic iconography of, for instance, the crucifixion or the last supper. The outdoor scenes of many spaghetti Westerns, especially those with a relatively higher budget, were shot in Spain, in particular the Tabernas desert of Almería and Colmenar Viejo and Hoyo de Manzanares. In Italy, the region of Lazio was a favorite location.

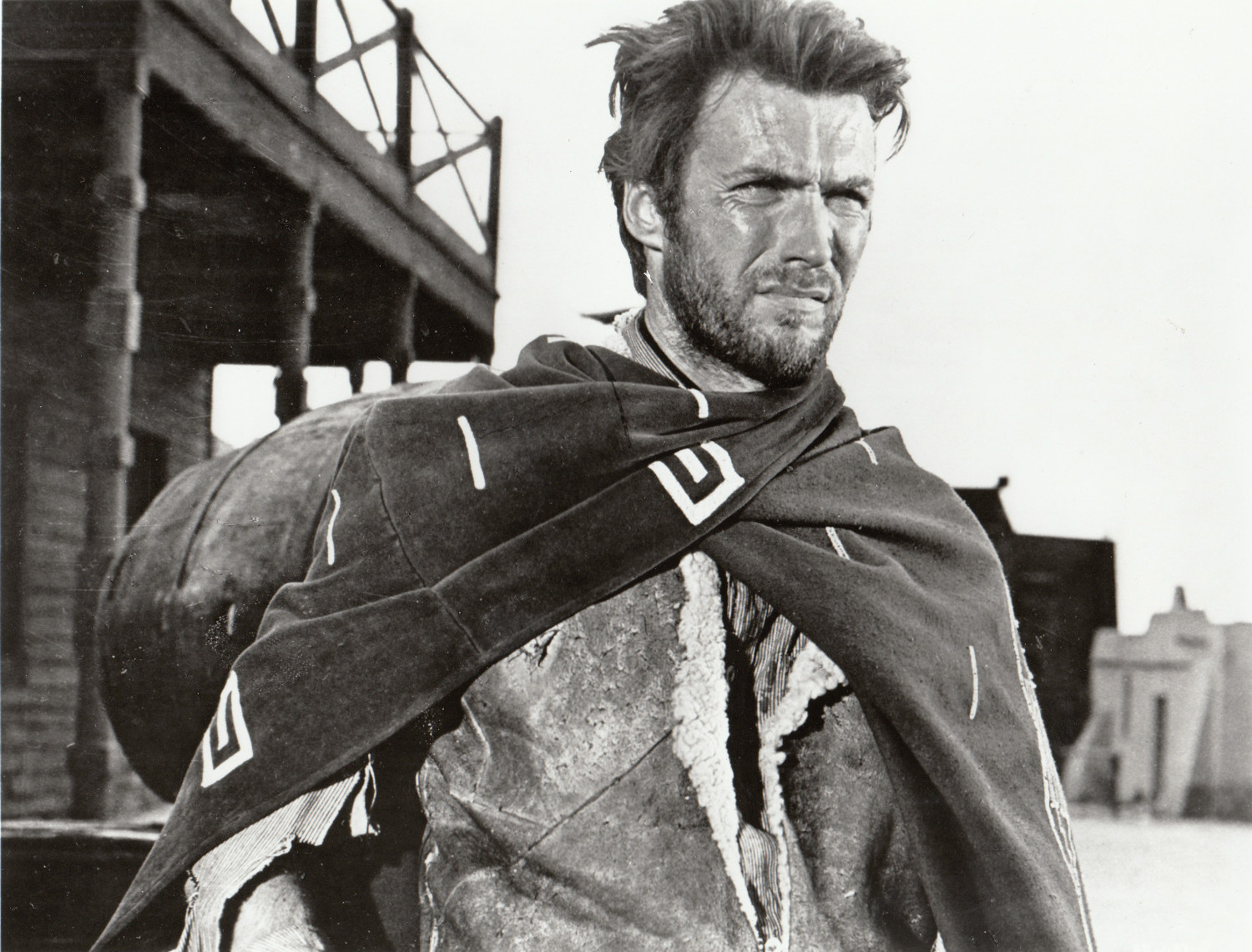
Clint Eastwood portrayed the Man with No Name (pictured in A Fistful of Dollars) in all three Dollars Trilogy films.

The genre expanded and became an international sensation with the success of Sergio Leone's A Fistful of Dollars, an adaptation of Akira Kurosawa's samurai film Yojimbo. But a handful of westerns were made in Italy before Leone redefined the genre, and the Italians were not the first to make westerns in Europe in the sixties. But it was Leone who defined the look and attitude of the genre with his first western and the two that soon were to follow: For a Few Dollars More and The Good, the Bad and the Ugly. Together these films are called the Dollars Trilogy. Leone's portrayal of the west, in the latter, was not concerned with ideas of the frontier or good vs. evil but rather interested in how the world is unmistakably more complicated than that, and how the western world is one of kill or be killed. These films featured knifings, beatings, shootouts, or other violent action every five to ten minutes. "The issue of morality belongs to the American western," explains Italian director Ferdinando Baldi. "The violence in our movies is more gratuitous than in American films. There was very little morality because often the protagonist was a bad guy." Eastwood's character is a violent and ruthless killer who murders opponents for fun and profit. Behind his cold and stony stare is a cynical mind powered by a dubious morality. Unlike earlier cowboy heroes, Eastwood's character constantly smokes a cigarillo and hardly ever shaves. He wears a flat-topped hat and Mexican poncho instead of more traditional western costuming. He never introduces himself when he meets anyone, and nobody ever asks his name. Furthermore, spaghetti Westerns redefined the western genre to fit the everchanging times of the 1960s and '70s. Rather than portraying the traditional mythic West as an exotic and beautiful land of opportunity, hope, and redemption, they depicted a desolate and forsaken West. In these violent and troubled times, spaghetti Westerns, with their antiheroes, ambiguous morals, brutality, and anti-Establishment themes, resonated with audiences. The films' gratuitous violence, surrealistic style, gloomy look, and eerie sound captured the era's melancholy. It is this new approach to the genre that defined the revisionist western of the late '70s and early '80s; a movement started by this moral ambiguity of the spaghetti Westerns, as well as a westerns placement in the context of historical events; both attributes defined and set by The Good, the Bad, and The Ugly.

These films have a recognisable style. With grandiose wide shots and close-ups that peered into the eyes and souls of the characters, The Good, The Bad, and The Ugly, had the defining cinematographic techniques of the spaghetti Western. This was Leone's signature technique, using long drawn shots interspersed with extreme close-ups that build tension, as well as develop characters. However, Leone's movies were not just influenced by style. As Quentin Tarantino notes:

There was also realism to them: those shitty Mexican towns, the little shacks — a bit bigger to accommodate the camera — all the plates they put the beans on, the big wooden spoons. The films were so realistic, which had always seemed to be missing in the westerns of the 1930s, '40s, and '50s, in the brutality and the different shades of grey and black. Leone found an even darker black and off-white. There is realism in Leone's presentation of the Civil War in The Good, the Bad and the Ugly that was missing from all the Civil War movies that happened before him. Leone's film, and the genre that he defined within it, shows a west that is more violent, less talky, more complex, more theatrical, and just overall more iconic through the use of music, appearing operatic as the music is an illustrative ingredient of the narrative.

With a greater sense of operatic violence than their American cousins, the cycle of spaghetti westerns lasted just a few years, but it has been said to have rewritten the genre.

=== Film tourism ===
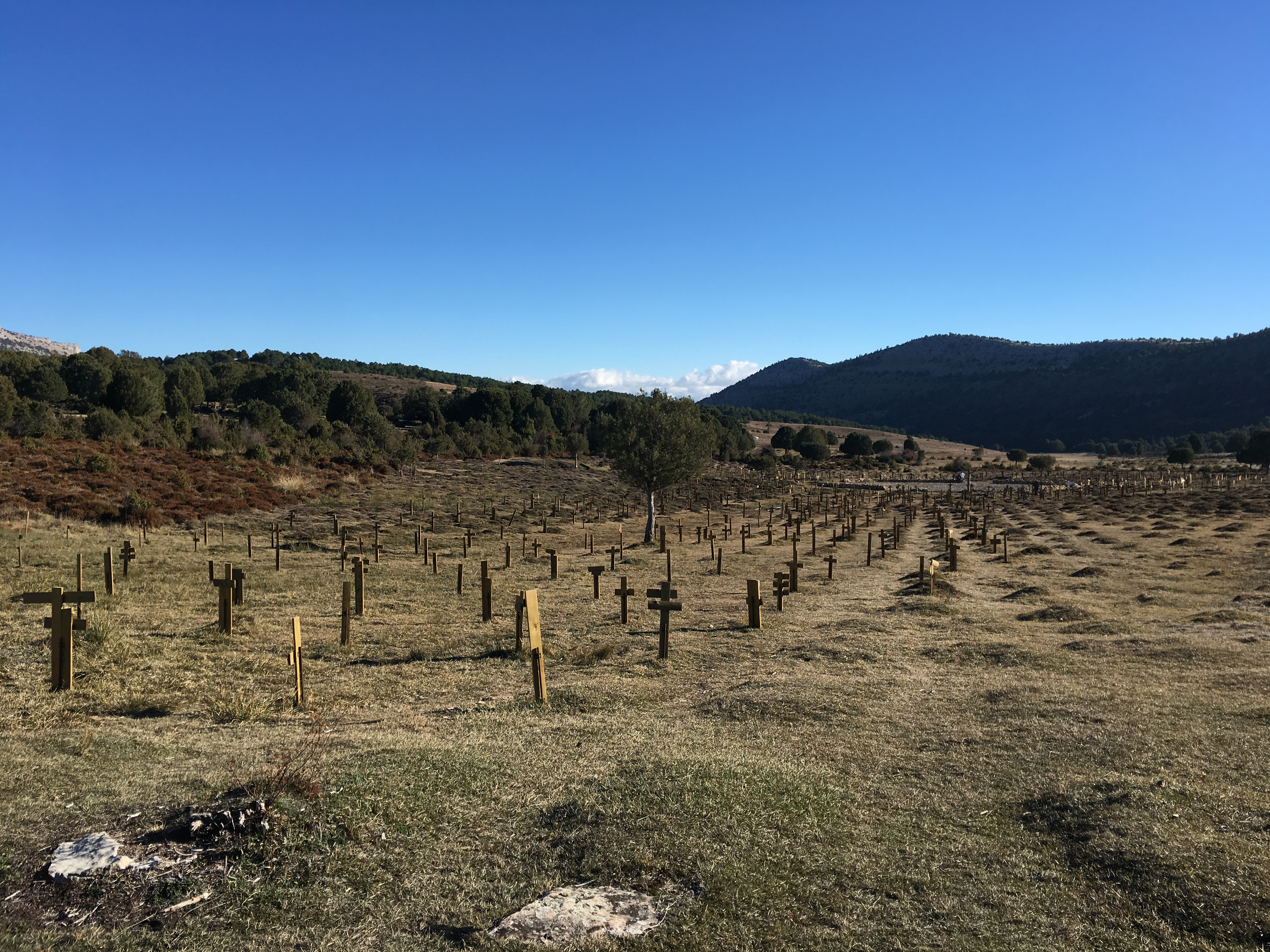
Sad Hill Cemetery photographed in 2016.

Fans of the film have reconstructed the location of the Sad Hill Cemetery in Santo Domingo de Silos, in Spain. The reconstruction was recorded in the documentary Sad Hill Unearthed (2017) by Guillermo de Oliveira. In 2024, the La Yecla y los Sabinares del Arlanza natural park announced a plan to rebuild the Betterville prisoner camp at its filmed location about 6 km from Sad Hill.

=== Proposed sequel ===
The Good, the Bad and the Ugly does not have an official sequel. However, screenwriter Luciano Vincenzoni stated on numerous occasions that he had written a treatment for a sequel, tentatively titled Il buono, il brutto, il cattivo n. 2 (The Good, the Bad and the Ugly 2). According to Vincenzoni and Eli Wallach, the film would have been set 20 years after the original and would have followed Tuco pursuing Blondie's grandson for the gold. The project was ultimately vetoed by Leone, as he did not want the original film's title or characters to be reused, nor did he want to be involved in another Western film.

== Bibliography ==
- Aquila, Richard (2015). The Sagebrush Trail: Western Movies and Twentieth-Century America (PDF). Tucson, Arizona: University of Arizona Press. ISBN 978-0-8165-3154-7. JSTOR j.ctt183gxp6.12.
- Cox, Alex (2009). 10,000 Ways to Die: A Director's Take on the Spaghetti Western. Oldcastle Books. ISBN 978-1-84243-304-1.
- Cumbow, Robert (2008). The Films of Sergio Leone. Scarecrow Press. ISBN 978-0-8108-6041-4.
- Eliot, Marc (2009). American Rebel: The Life of Clint Eastwood. Harmony Books. ISBN 978-0-307-33688-0.
- Frayling, Christopher (2000). Sergio Leone: Something To Do With Death. Faber & Faber. ISBN 0-571-16438-2.
- Frayling, Christopher (2006). Spaghetti Westerns: Cowboys and Europeans from Karl May to Sergio Leone. I.B. Tauris & Co. Ltd. ISBN 978-1-84511-207-3.
- Giusti, Marco (2007). Dizionario del western all'italiana. Mondadori. ISBN 978-88-04-57277-0.
- Hughes, Howard (2009). Aim for the Heart. London: I. B. Tauris. ISBN 978-1-84511-902-7.
- Hughes, Howard (2004). Once Upon a Time in the Italian West. I. B. Tauris. ISBN 978-1-85043-430-6.
- Leinberger, Charles (2004). Ennio Morricone's The Good, The Bad and the Ugly: A Film Score Guide. Scarecrow Press. ISBN 978-0-8108-5132-0.
- McGilligan, Patrick (2002) [1999]. Clint: The Life and Legend. New York: St. Martin's Press. ISBN 978-0-312-29032-0.
- Munn, Michael (1992). Clint Eastwood: Hollywood's Loner. London: Robson Books. ISBN 0-86051-790-X.
