= List of Uma Thurman performances =

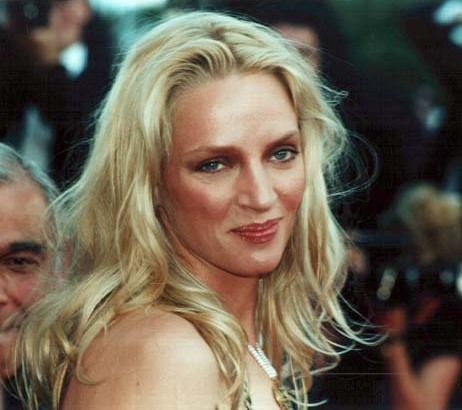
Thurman at the 2010 Cannes Film Festival

The following is the complete list of performances by American actress Uma Thurman.

== Film ==
Year	Title	Role	Notes	Ref.
1987	Kiss Daddy Goodnight	Laura		
1988	Johnny Be Good	Georgia Elkans		
1988	The Adventures of Baron Munchausen	Venus / Rose		
1988	Dangerous Liaisons	Cécile de Volanges		
1990	Where the Heart Is	Daphne McBain		
1990	Henry & June	June Miller		
1991	Robin Hood	Maid Marian		
1992	Final Analysis	Diana Baylor		
1992	Jennifer 8	Helena Robertson		
1993	Mad Dog and Glory	Glory		
1993	Even Cowgirls Get the Blues	Sissy Hankshaw		
1994	Pulp Fiction	Mia Wallace		
1995	A Month by the Lake	Miss Beaumont		
1996	Beautiful Girls	Andera		
1996	The Truth About Cats & Dogs	Noelle Sluarsky		
1996	Duke of Groove	Maya	Short film	
1997	Batman & Robin	Dr. Pamela Isley / Poison Ivy		
1997	Gattaca	Irene Cassini		
1998	Les Misérables	Fantine		
1998	The Avengers	Emma Peel		
1999	Sweet and Lowdown	Blanche		
2000	Vatel	Anne de Montausier		
2000	The Golden Bowl	Charlotte Stant		
2001	Tape	Amy Randall		
2001	Chelsea Walls	Grace		
2003	Paycheck	Dr. Rachel Porter		
2003	Kill Bill: Volume 1	The Bride	Also co-creator of character	
2004	Kill Bill: Volume 2	Beatrix Kiddo / The Bride	Also co-creator of character	
2004	Kill Bill: The Whole Bloody Affair	Beatrix Kiddo / The Bride	Also co-creator of character	
2005	Nausicaä of the Valley of the Wind	Kushana	Voice role (English version)	
2005	Be Cool	Edie Athens		
2005	Prime	Rafi Gardet		
2005	The Naked Brothers Band: The Movie	Herself		
2005	The Producers	Ulla		
2006	My Super Ex-Girlfriend	Jenny Johnson / G-Girl		
2007	The Life Before Her Eyes	Adult Diana McFee		
2008	The Accidental Husband	Emma Lloyd	Producer	
2009	Motherhood	Eliza Welsh		
2010	Percy Jackson & the Olympians: The Lightning Thief	Medusa		
2010	Ceremony	Zoe		
2012	Bel Ami	Madeleine Forestier		
2012	Playing for Keeps	Patti King		
2013	Movie 43	Lois Lane	Segment "Super Hero Speed Dating"	
2013	Nymphomaniac	Mrs. H		
2014	The Mundane Goddess	Hera	Short film	
2014	The Gift	Miss Anderson	Short film	
2014	Jump	Wendy	Short film	
2015	Burnt	Simone		
2018	The Con Is On	Harriet Fox		
2018	The House That Jack Built	Lady 1		
2018	Down a Dark Hall	Madame Simone Duret		
2020	The War with Grandpa	Sally Decker		
2022	Hollywood Stargirl	Roxanne Martel		
2023	Red, White & Royal Blue	President Ellen Claremont		
2023	The Kill Room	Patricia		
2024	Oh, Canada	Emma / Gloria		
2025	The King of Kings	Catherine Dickens	Voice role	
2025	The Old Guard 2	Discord		
2025	The Lost Chapter: Yuki's Revenge	Beatrix Kiddo / The Bride	Voice role, short film	
2026	Pretty Lethal	Devora Kasimer		
TBA	Red, White & Royal Wedding †	President Ellen Claremont	Post-production	

Key
†	Denotes films that have not yet been released

== Television ==
Year	Title	Role	Notes
2000	Great Books	Narrator	Episode: "Les Misérables"
2002	Hysterical Blindness	Debby Miller	Executive producer; TV movie
2008	My Zinc Bed	Elsa Quinn	TV movie
2008	A Muppets Christmas: Letters to Santa	Joy	TV movie
2012	Smash	Rebecca Duvall	5 episodes
2014	American Dad!	Gwen Ling	Voice role; Episode: "Now and Gwen"
2015	The Slap	Anouk Latham	6 episodes
2017–2018	Imposters	Lenny Cohen	6 episodes
2019	Chambers	Nancy Lefevre	Main role
2021	Nature	Narrator	3 episodes
2022	Suspicion	Katherine Newman	Main role
2022	Super Pumped	Arianna Huffington	Main role
2025–present	Dexter: Resurrection	Charlotte "Charley" Brown	10 episodes

== Stage ==
Year	Title	Role	Notes
1999	The Misanthrope	Celimene	Classic Stage Company, Off-Broadway
2017–2018	The Parisian Woman	Chloe	Hudson Theatre, Broadway
2019	Ghosts	Mrs. Helene Alving	Williamstown Theatre Festival, Regional

== Video games ==
Year	Title	Role	Notes
2025	Fortnite Battle Royale	Beatrix Kiddo / The Bride	
