= List of awards and nominations received by Uma Thurman =

Uma Thurman awards and nominations
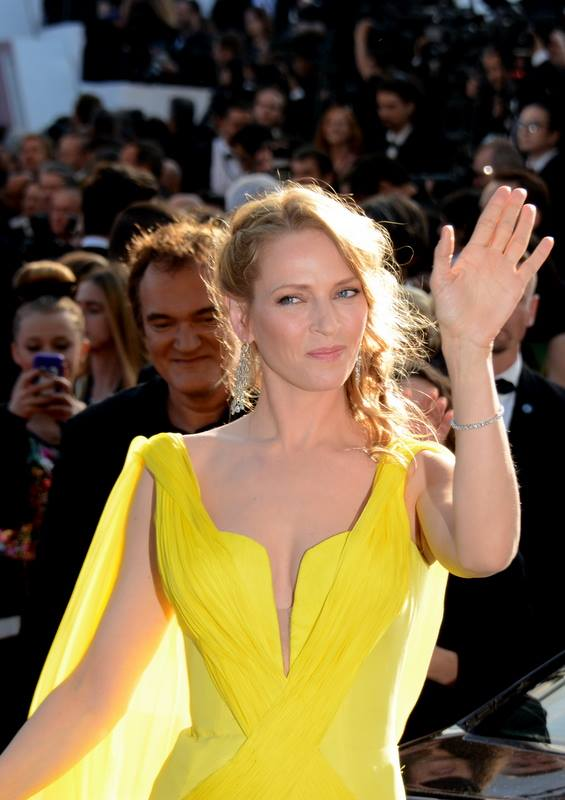
- Thurman at the 2014 Cannes Film Festival
Awards and nominations
Award	Wins	Nominations
Academy Awards	0	1
Actor Awards	0	2
BAFTA Awards	0	2
Golden Globes	1	4
Primetime Emmy Awards	0	1

Totals (Note: Certain award groups do not simply award one winner. They acknowledge several different recipients, have runners-up, and have third place. Since this is a specific recognition and is different from losing an award, runner-up mentions are considered wins in this award tally. For simplification and to avoid errors, each award in this list has been presumed to have had a prior nomination.)
- Wins: 24
- Nominations: 66

Uma Thurman is an American actress who has received various accolades throughout her career, including a Golden Globe Award and nominations for an Academy Award, two Actor Awards, two British Academy Film Awards (BAFTA), and a Primetime Emmy Award.

Thurman rose to international prominence with her portrayal of Mia Wallace in the black comedy film Pulp Fiction (1994), her first collaboration with director Quentin Tarantino. Her performance was universally acclaimed and she was nominated for the Academy Award for Best Supporting Actress, the corresponding prizes at the Actor Awards and Golden Globe Awards, and the BAFTA Award for Best Actress in a Leading Role. She reunited with Tarantino to play The Bride / Beatrix Kiddo in the martial arts films Kill Bill: Volume 1 (2003) and Volume 2 (2004), receiving nominations for a BAFTA Award for the first installment and the Golden Globe Award for Best Actress in a Motion Picture – Drama for both chapters of the series. Her other film roles include the 2001 Richard Linklater's drama film Tape, that earned her a nomination for the Independent Spirit Award for Best Supporting Female, and the 2013 erotic art film Nymphomaniac written and directed by Lars von Trier, for which she was nominated for the Robert Award for Best Actress in a Supporting Role, Denmark's most prestigious film prize.

Thurman's work on television includes the 2003 HBO television drama film Hysterical Blindness, which won her the Golden Globe Award for Best Actress in a Miniseries or Television Film, and a recurring role in the NBC musical drama series Smash (2012), for which she was nominated for the Primetime Emmy Award for Outstanding Guest Actress in a Drama Series.

== Awards and nominations ==
Association	Year	Category	Work	Result	Ref.
Academy Awards	1995	Best Supporting Actress	Pulp Fiction	Nominated	
Actor Awards	1995	Best Actress in a Supporting Role	Pulp Fiction	Nominated	
Actor Awards	2003	Best Actress in a Miniseries or Television Film	Hysterical Blindness	Nominated	
American Comedy Awards	1995	Funniest Leading Actress in a Motion Picture	Pulp Fiction	Nominated	
Bambi Awards	2014	Best International Actress	—	Won	
Blockbuster Entertainment Awards	1998	Favorite Actress – Science Fiction	Batman & Robin	Won	
Bodil Awards	2014	Best Actress in a Supporting Role	Nymphomaniac	Nominated	
Boston Film Festival Awards	2009	Best Actress	Motherhood	Won	
Boston Film Festival Awards	2009	Film Excellence Award	—	Won	
British Academy Film Awards	1995	Best Actress in a Leading Role	Pulp Fiction	Nominated	
British Academy Film Awards	2004	Best Actress in a Leading Role	Kill Bill: Volume 1	Nominated	
Chicago International Film Festival Awards	2009	Career Achievement Award	—	Won	
Chlotrudis Awards	1995	Best Supporting Actress	Pulp Fiction	Nominated	
Critics' Choice Awards	2005	Best Actress	Kill Bill: Volume 2	Nominated	
David di Donatello Awards	1995	Best Foreign Actress	Pulp Fiction	Nominated	
David di Donatello Awards	2019	Special David Award	—	Won	
EDA Awards	2006	Actress Most in Need of a New Agent	—	Won	
EDA Awards	2021	She Deserves a New Agent	The War with Grandpa	Won	
Elle Women in Hollywood Awards	2012	Woman of the Year	—	Won	
Empire Awards	2004	Best Actress	Kill Bill: Volume 1	Won	
Empire Awards	2005	Best Actress	Kill Bill: Volume 2	Nominated	
Film Independent Spirit Awards	2002	Best Supporting Female	Tape	Nominated	
Golden Globes	1995	Best Supporting Actress – Motion Picture	Pulp Fiction	Nominated	
Golden Globes	2003	Best Actress in a Miniseries or Television Film	Hysterical Blindness	Won	
Golden Globes	2004	Best Actress in a Motion Picture – Drama	Kill Bill: Volume 1	Nominated	
Golden Globes	2005	Best Actress in a Motion Picture – Drama	Kill Bill: Volume 2	Nominated	
Golden Raspberry Awards	1995	Worst Actress	Even Cowgirls Get the Blues	Nominated	
Golden Raspberry Awards	1998	Worst Supporting Actress	Batman & Robin	Nominated	
Golden Raspberry Awards	1999	Worst Actress	The Avengers	Nominated	
Golden Raspberry Awards	1999	Worst Screen Couple (Note: Shared with Ralph Fiennes)	The Avengers	Nominated	
Gotham Awards	2001	Actor Award	—	Won	
IFTA Film & Drama Awards	2004	Best International Actress	Kill Bill: Volume 2	Nominated	
International Cinephile Society Awards	2004	Best Actress	Kill Bill: Volume 1	Won	
Jupiter Awards	2005	Best International Actress	Kill Bill: Volume 2	Won	
Jupiter Awards	2015	Best International Actress	Nymphomaniac	Nominated	
Las Vegas Film Critics Society Awards	2004	Best Actress	Kill Bill: Volume 1	Nominated	
MTV Movie & TV Awards	1995	Best Female Performance	Pulp Fiction	Nominated	
MTV Movie & TV Awards	1995	Best Dance Sequence (Note: Shared with John Travolta)	Pulp Fiction	Won	
MTV Movie & TV Awards	2004	Best Female Performance	Kill Bill: Volume 1	Won	
MTV Movie & TV Awards	2004	Best Fight (Note: Shared with Chiaki Kuriyama)	Kill Bill: Volume 1	Won	
MTV Movie & TV Awards	2005	Best Female Performance	Kill Bill: Volume 2	Nominated	
MTV Movie & TV Awards	2005	Best Fight (Note: Shared with Daryl Hannah)	Kill Bill: Volume 2	Won	
MTV Movie & TV Awards	2007	Best Fight (Note: Shared with Anna Faris)	My Super Ex-Girlfriend	Nominated	
MTV Movie Awards Mexico	2004	Funniest Gringo in Japan	Kill Bill: Volume 1	Nominated	
National Society of Film Critics Awards	1991	Best Supporting Actress	Henry & June; Where the Heart Is	Runner-up	
National Society of Film Critics Awards	1995	Best Supporting Actress	Pulp Fiction	Runner-up	
New York Film Critics Circle Awards	1995	Best Supporting Actress	Pulp Fiction	Runner-up	
Nickelodeon Kids' Choice Awards	1998	Favorite Movie Actress	Batman & Robin	Nominated	
Online Film Critics Society Awards	2004	Best Actress	Kill Bill: Volume 1	Nominated	
Online Film Critics Society Awards	2005	Best Actress	Kill Bill: Volume 2	Nominated	
People's Choice Awards	2005	Favorite Female Action Movie Star	—	Nominated	
People's Choice Awards	2007	Favorite Female Action Movie Star	—	Nominated	
Primetime Emmy Awards	2012	Outstanding Guest Actress in a Drama Series	Smash	Nominated	
Robert Awards	2015	Best Actress in a Supporting Role	Nymphomaniac	Nominated	
Russian National Movie Awards	2005	Best Actress	Kill Bill: Volume 2	Won	
Russian National Movie Awards	2014	Foreign Actress of the Decade	—	Nominated	
Satellite Awards	2004	Best Original Screenplay (Note: Shared with Quentin Tarantino)	Kill Bill: Volume 1	Nominated	
Satellite Awards	2005	Best Actress in a Motion Picture – Drama	Kill Bill: Volume 2	Nominated	
Saturn Awards	2004	Best Actress	Kill Bill: Volume 1	Won	
Saturn Awards	2005	Best Actress	Kill Bill: Volume 2	Nominated	
Saturn Awards	2026	Best Supporting Actress on Television	Dexter: Resurrection	Nominated	
Stinkers Bad Movie Awards	1999	Worst Actress	The Avengers	Nominated	
Stinkers Bad Movie Awards	1999	Worst On-Screen Couple	The Avengers	Nominated	
Stinkers Bad Movie Awards	1999	Most Annoying Fake Accent	The Avengers	Nominated	
Stockholm Film Festival Awards	2014	Achievement Award	—	Won	
Teen Choice Awards	2004	Actress: Drama/Action Adventure	Kill Bill: Volume 2	Nominated	
