= Barbara Tfank =

American fashion designer

Barbara Tfank is an American fashion designer, best known for designing the lavender Prada gown worn by Uma Thurman at the 67th Academy Awards.

== Career ==
A native of New York, Tfank is a graduate of Skidmore College and holds a masters from Stanford University. She apprenticed with designer Sal Cesarani and worked as a costume designer for films, including A Midnight Clear and Dream Lover.

She also worked as a stylist for Avedon, for Japanese TV and as a design consultant for Prada. During her time with Prada, she designed the lavender dress that Uma Thurman wore at the 67th Academy Awards in 1995.

Tfank started her own design line with a collection for Barneys in 2001. Since 2006, Tfank has shown her designs at New York Fashion Week; she has also shown at Houston Fashion Week. She regularly collaborates with shoe designer Manolo Blahnik, sagafurs, and Shiseido.

Tfank's high-profile clients include First Lady Michelle Obama, who wore a Tfank dress to meet Queen Elizabeth II on the Obama's official visit to the UK in 2011 and for the 2012 State of the Union Address, fashion writer Tatiana Hambro, who wore a custom Tfank dress for her wedding, and singer Adele, who wore Barbara Tfank to the 2009 Grammys and the 2011 MTV Video Music Awards.

== 1995 Oscar dress ==
While working as a design consultant for Prada, Tfank was responsible for designing the lavender or lilac-colored Prada dress worn by Uma Thurman at the 67th Academy Awards on March 27, 1995. Bronwyn Cosgrave in her 2006 book Made For Each Other: Fashion and the Academy Awards describes the dress as being beautifully crafted and admired for weeks afterwards by the media. The 2000 book Fashion: The Century of the Designer 1900–1999 credits the dress for opening up Prada in Hollywood saying, "...Uma Thurman appeared at the ceremony in a lavender gown and stole, catapulting herself onto magazine covers and bringing Prada to the attention of Hollywood." Variety magazine's 2003 Complete Book of Oscar Fashion described it as "the gown that launched a thousand imitations"; and indeed, a year later, Nicole Kidman wore a Prada dress of an identical colour at the 68th Academy Awards.
