= Tape (play) =

1999 play written by Stephen Belber

Tape is a 1999 play by Stephen Belber. The piece premiered and was produced by Access Theater in Tribeca, NY in 1999. Next it was produced at the Actors Theatre of Louisville as part of the 2000 Humana Festival of New American Plays. It was later filmed by Richard Linklater as Tape starring Ethan Hawke, Robert Sean Leonard, and Uma Thurman. It follows classical unities of action, time and space, featuring three characters in a single plot regarding their differing perspectives of past events, in one unbroken period of real-time, in a single motel room set.

== Synopsis ==
Tape is set in a motel room in Lansing, Michigan. Vince, an outgoing drug dealer/volunteer firefighter, is in town to support his old high school friend's entry into the Lansing film festival.

His friend, documentary filmmaker Jon Saltzman, joins Vince in his motel room and the two begin to reminisce about their high school years. They get on the subject of Amy Randall, Vince's former girlfriend. It appears that whilst they dated for some time, Vince and Amy never had sex. However, after their relationship had ended, Amy had slept with Jon. Naturally, Vince was hurt even though he and Amy had broken up some time previously.

Vince claims Amy had told him that Jon had date raped her. Vince becomes obsessed with, and eventually succeeds in getting a verbal confession from Jon about the alleged rape. Immediately after Jon's admission, Vince pulls out a hidden tape recorder that had been recording their whole conversation, much to Jon's horror. Vince then tells Jon that he has invited Amy to dinner, and that she will be arriving shortly.

Eventually Amy does arrive and even though all three of them feel awkward, they begin to talk. Amy explains that she is now an Assistant District Attorney in the Lansing Justice Department. Eventually the three discuss what actually happened between Jon and Amy that night at the party.

Amy claims that it was merely rough sex and that Jon did not rape her, leading Jon to believe that she is in denial. After Jon becomes annoyed that Amy is refusing to accept his apology, Amy makes a call with her cell phone to the local police. She asks for a squad car to pick up one person in possession of drugs (Vince), and one in relation to a verifiable rape (Jon). After concluding her phone call, Amy warns the men that they only have about four minutes to make a run for it.

In order to prove to Amy that he is truly remorseful, Jon decides to stay and wait for the police. Vince flushes his narcotics down the toilet.

Amy reveals that she didn't really call the police, and leaves.

== Notable Performances ==
- New York City 2002 produced by Naked Angels Theater Company at the Jose Quintero Theater with Dominic Fumusa, Josh Stamberg and Alison West.
- Dublin 2002 produced by AboutFACE Theatre Company at Theatre@36 with Paul Nugent, Anna Olson and Alan Walsh.
- Soho Theatre, London, 2003 with the original NY cast.
- New York City 2008 produced by The Group Theatre Too at the 78th street theatre lab with Alex Maxwell, Nicky Romaniello and Cristina Marie
- New York City 2010 produced by Duel Theatre at Center Stage, NY with Brandon McMillen, James Savage, and Jessie Datino
- Milwaukee 2010 produced by Pink Banana Theatre at (site specific) Best Western Inn Towne, WI with Matt Kemple, Robb Maass, and Gwen Zupan
- Williamstown, Massachusetts 2011 produced by the Williamstown Theatre Festival as part of their Workshop Season
- Pauper's Pit Theatre, Buxton 2008 – nominated for 'Best Production’ at Buxton Festival Fringe Awards. Selected for the re:play Festival 2009 at Library Theatre Manchester, Northern Outlet Theatre Company with Ric Ward, Ryan Cerenko and Marie Louise Cookson. Directed by Paul Blinkhorn.
- New York City 2014 The debut production of The Frame Theatre Company at TBG Theatre with Doug Goldring, Jacqueline Herbert, and James Kivlen
- New York City 2017 Production at the Bridge Theatre at Shetler Studios with George Carpenter, Ryan Perez, and Laura Piccoli.
- Orlando, Florida 2019 Theater on the Edge production with Zack Roundy, Joey Ginel, and Megan Raitano.
- Alexandria, Minnesota 2019 Fire Pit Productions with Joe Johnson, Quincy Roers, and Carolyn Giannone.
- Tehran 2024 produced by Seyyed Ali Sadatian at Iranshahr Theater with Kazem Sayahi, Mojtaba Pirzadeh, and Setareh Pesyani
