= 40th David di Donatello =

1995 Italian film awards

- Date: 3 June 1995
- Site: Campidoglio, Rome
- Hosted by: Vincenzo Mollica

Highlights
- Best Picture: La scuola
- Most awards: Nasty Love, Lamerica (3)
- Most nominations: Nasty Love (8)

Television coverage
- Network: Rai 1

The 40th David di Donatello ceremony, presented by the Accademia del Cinema Italiano, was held on 3 June 1995.

== Winners and nominees ==
Best Film: La scuola, directed by Daniele Luchetti; Nasty Love, directed by Mario Martone; Il Postino: The Postman, directed by Michael Radford	Best Producer: Pietro Valsecchi – Un eroe borghese; Angelo Curti, Andrea Occhipinti, Kermit Smith – Nasty Love; Elda Ferri – According to Pereira; Marco Poccioni, Marco Valsania – No Skin
Best Director: Mario Martone – Nasty Love; Gianni Amelio – Lamerica; Alessandro D'Alatri – No Skin	Best New Director: Paolo Virzì – Living It Up; Sandro Baldoni – Weird Tales; Alberto Simone – Colpo di luna
Best Actor: Marcello Mastroianni – According to Pereira; Fabrizio Bentivoglio – Un eroe borghese; Massimo Troisi – Il Postino: The Postman	Best Actress: Anna Bonaiuto – Nasty Love; Sabrina Ferilli – Living It Up; Anna Galiena – No Skin
Best Supporting Actor: Giancarlo Giannini – Like Two Crocodiles; Roberto Citran – The Bull; Philippe Noiret – Il Postino: The Postman	Best Supporting Actress: Angela Luce – Nasty Love; Virna Lisi – La Reine Margot; Ottavia Piccolo – Bidoni
David di Donatello for Best Screenplay: Alessandro D'Alatri – No Skin (ex aequo); Luigi Magni, Carla Vistarini – Nemici d'infanzia (ex aequo); Alessandro Benvenuti, Ugo Chiti, Nicola Zavagli – Belle al bar	Best Cinematography: Luca Bigazzi – Lamerica; Luca Bigazzi – Nasty Love; Franco Di Giacomo – Il Postino: The Postman
Best Production Design: Andrea Crisanti – A Pure Formality; Giantito Burchiellaro – According to Pereira; Gianni Quaranta – Farinelli	Best Score: Franco Piersanti – Lamerica; Luis Bacalov – Il Postino: The Postman; Pino Donaggio – Un eroe borghese
Best Editing: Roberto Perpignani – Il Postino: The Postman; Ruggero Mastroianni – According to Pereira; Simona Paggi – Lamerica; Jacopo Quadri – Nasty Love	Best Sound: Alessandro Zanon – Lamerica; Mario Iaquone, Daghi Rondanini – Nasty Love; Tullio Morganti – No Skin
Best Costumes: Olga Berluti – Farinelli; Elisabetta Beraldo – According to Pereira; Moidele Bickel – La Reine Margot	Best Foreign Film: Pulp Fiction, directed by Quentin Tarantino; Forrest Gump, directed by Robert Zemeckis; Burnt by the Sun, directed by Nikita Mikhalkov
Best Foreign Actor: John Travolta – Pulp Fiction; Hugh Grant – Four Weddings and a Funeral; Tom Hanks – Forrest Gump	Best Foreign Actress: Jodie Foster – Nell; Andie MacDowell – Four Weddings and a Funeral; Uma Thurman – Pulp Fiction
Special David: Milcho Manchevski; Michele Placido; Vittorio Cecchi Gori; Aurelio De Laurentiis	Luchino Visconti Award: Pupi Avati
