= Palácio Belmonte =

Palace in Lisbon, Portugal

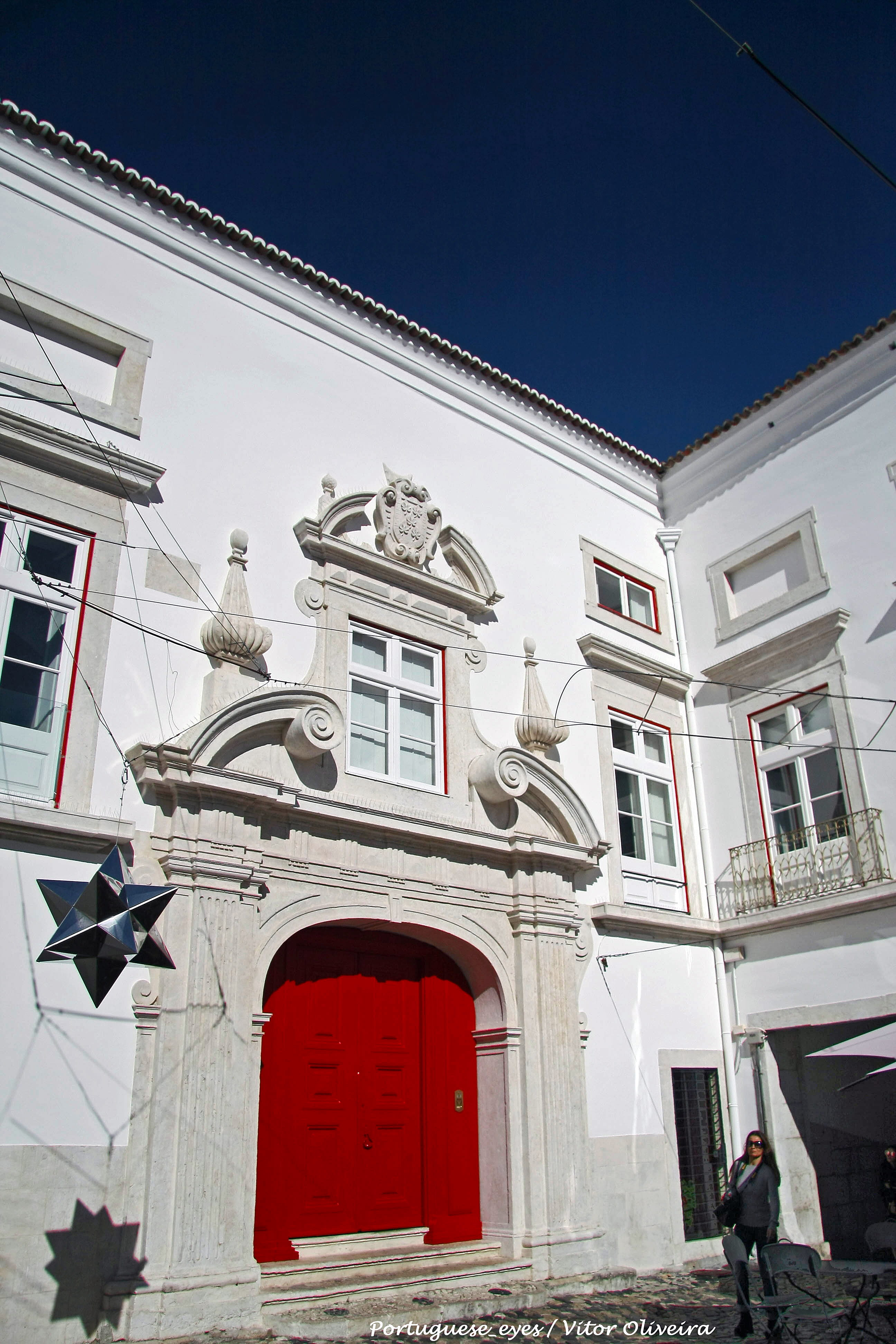
- Interactive map of the Palácio Belmonte area

General information
- Architectural style: Roman and Moorish influences
- Location: Pátio de Dom Fradique 15, 1100-261 Lisbon, Portugal
- Coordinates: 38.71244°N 9.13167°W
- Construction started: 1449
- Owner: Brás Afonso Correia

Palácio Belmonte (aka Palácio dos Condes de Belmonte) is a palace located at the Pátio de D. Fradique in Lisbon, Portugal.

== History ==
Palácio Belmonte, one of the oldest palaces in Lisbon, was initially built in 1449 by Brás Afonso Correia, an official in the court of King Dom Manuel I and the Inspector-General of Lisbon. It was constructed over Roman and Moorish ruins around the ancient Alcáçova and Cerca moura walls, which were around 1,500 years old at the time. Riu de Figueiredo turned it into a manor house by acquiring and converting land, old houses, a yard, and a stable. At this time, the complex included the walls, a door called D. Fradique, a turret, and two towers (dating from the fifteenth and sixteenth centuries).

The oldest parts of the palace include a medieval keep and fortifications, built with Roman and Moorish influences on Roman and Moorish foundations.

In 1503, after leading the first European expedition to reach Brazil, Pedro Álvares Cabral built the first part of the present palace in 1503. As the Palácio's neighborhood and the primitive nucleus of Lisbon, Almafa, became the stage for major national events, Palácio Belmonte assumed an important role as well. For instance, Vasco da Gama was received there after his successful return from India. The palace was also where Gil Vicente presented his first play, and the famous Portuguese historian Fernão Lopes wrote his chronicles.

In 1640, the year when the palace underwent its most significant restoration, the building was expanded by adding what is now known as the Terrace Suites and the five facades in the classical style. These changes constitute most of what we see of the palace today. Between 1720 and 1730, two great masters of Portuguese tiles, Manuel Santos and Valentim de Almeida, contributed a unique collection of 59 panels. The panels contain more than 30,000 tiles, depicting episodes of Christianity and scenes from the Portuguese court of the time. On the main door are the arms of Figueiredo, with five fig leaves accompanying the words "Pro Deo Pro Patria PN AM".

The palace's notable architectural features include its vaulted ceilings, arched doorways, and painted frescoes. The palácio's collection of tiles, peculiar eighteenth-century fireplace, and its garden with its view over Alfama, São Vicente de Fora, and the Tagus river, earned Belmonte recognition as a National Heritage site.

Today, it has been transformed into a luxury hotel, consisting of ten suites. Each suite is named after a figure of Portuguese history: Fernão Magalhães, Egas Moniz, Fernão Mendes Pinto, Gil Vicente, and Bartolomeu de Gusmão, among others.

Frederic Coustouls purchased and restored the palácio in 1994 with the assistance of the city of Lisbon and the European Union. The restoration focused on the creation of spaces and rooms that feature distinctive character with an emphasis on intimacy. In addition, the builders also integrated elements of sustainable design, using heavy insulation, large windows, and natural ventilation.

The German director Wim Wenders chose the palace as a location to shoot his film Lisbon Story. Marcello Mastroianni also used the palace for the film Sostiene Pereira.

== Belmonte Cultural Club ==
The Belmonte Cultural Club is an exhibition space and live music venue, within Palacio Belmonte, curated and managed by the museum WOA - Way Of Arts and its staff.
