= Lavender Prada dress of Uma Thurman =

Dress worn by Uma Thurman at the 1995 Academy Awards

- Designer: Barbara Tfank for Prada
- Year: 1995
- Type: Lavender dress

American actress Uma Thurman wore a Prada dress in lavender (lilac) chiffon to the 67th Academy Awards on March 27, 1995, at which she was nominated for Best Supporting Actress for Pulp Fiction. The dress was designed by American designer Barbara Tfank.

The dress was well-received by contemporary critics, and in retrospect is considered one of Thurman's most memorable red carpet looks. Variety magazine's 2003 Complete Book of Oscar Fashion described it as "the gown that launched a thousand imitations"; and indeed, a year later, Nicole Kidman wore a Prada dress of an identical colour at the 68th Academy Awards. In a 2011 retrospective of Oscars dresses, CNN called the color of the dress "exquisite" and highlighted the delicacy of the chiffon.

The appearance of the dress on the red carpet has been credited with bringing Prada's clothing into the mainstream in America. The brand had previously been relatively obscure, best known for making high-end accessories, particularly their black backpacks.

== See also ==
- List of individual dresses
- Crimson Alberta Ferretti dress of Uma Thurman
