= Crimson Alberta Ferretti dress of Uma Thurman =

Worn to the 72nd Academy Awards

- Designer: Alberta Ferretti
- Year: 2000
- Type: Crimson dress

American actress Uma Thurman wore a crimson Alberta Ferretti dress to the 72nd Academy Awards on March 26, 2000. In a poll by Debenhams published in The Daily Telegraph the dress was voted the 20th greatest red carpet gown of all time.

The dress remains among the most iconic dresses worn at the Academy Awards.

== See also ==
- List of individual dresses
- Lavender Prada dress of Uma Thurman
