= Houston fashion week =

Houston Fashion Week was branded in 2010 as the first organized fashion week event in Texas. The annual, week-long event is held during October, and came to fruition because New York Fashion Week relocated from Bryant Park to Lincoln Center. The resulting confusion over the move opened the door for new venues throughout the nation, such as Austin, Dallas, San Antonio, and Houston. Houston Fashion Week has introduced several designers, including Ann Mitchels, Ayo Shittu, Krystel Holnes, Lucas Escalada, and Carol Reyes (San Antonio).
