= Kiss Daddy Goodnight =

- Theatrical release poster
- Directed by: Peter Ily Huemer
- Written by: Peter Ily Huemer; Michael Gabrieli
- Produced by: Maureen O'Brien; William Ripka
- Starring: Uma Thurman; Paul Dillon; Paul Richards; David Brisbin
- Cinematography: Bobby Bukowski; Doug Cooper
- Edited by: Ila von Hasperg
- Music by: Don King
- Production company: Beast of Eden Productions
- Distributed by: Upfront Films
- Release dates: October 29, 1987 (AFI Independent Film Festival); May 20, 1988 (United States)
- Running time: 89 minutes
- Country: United States
- Language: English

Kiss Daddy Goodnight is a 1987 American neo-noir psychological thriller film directed by Peter Ily Huemer. It stars Uma Thurman in her film debut, and Steve Buscemi in a small role.

== Plot ==
Laura is a model who obtains additional income by picking up men, slipping them a mickey, and robbing them. She has a friendship with her neighbor William Tilden. Laura pegs men ruthlessly after slipping them a mickey. Sid tracks Laura down in search of her ex Johnny, with whom he wishes to start a band.

== Cast ==
- Uma Thurman as Laura
- Paul Dillon as Sid
- Paul Richards as William Tilden
- Steve Buscemi as Johnny
- Annabelle Gurwitch as Sue
