= The Parisian Woman =

2013 play by Beau Willimon

- Written by: Beau Willimon
- Genre: Drama
- Setting: Late Fall, Washington, D.C.

Premiere
- Date: April 14, 2013
- Place: South Coast Repertory, Costa Mesa, California

The Parisian Woman is a 2013 play by Beau Willimon. It premiered at the South Coast Repertory in April 2013 and centers on Chloe, a socialite armed with charm and wit, coming to terms with politics, her past, her marriage and an uncertain future. The play opened on Broadway on November 30, 2017. The play is inspired by Henri Becque’s La Parisienne (fr).

== Production history ==
Its premiere production was at the South Coast Repertory, Costa Mesa, California, from April 19 to May 5, 2013, with previews from April 14, directed by Pam MacKinnon.

The play opened on Broadway for a limited engagement at the Hudson Theatre starting November 30, 2017, following previews which began November 7. The play closed on March 11, 2018. The play, directed by Pam MacKinnon, starred Uma Thurman in her Broadway debut.

The Parisian Woman went through significant rewrites since its first production at South Coast Repertory. Willimon said: “When [the election] did happen—this cataclysmic shift in the country,” says the playwright, “I felt that if I didn’t address it, the play would instantly feel anachronistic. It would be disingenuous to the here and the now to not acknowledge the fact that we’re living in a very different landscape.”

== Characters and original cast ==
Character	South Coast Repertory (2013)	Broadway (2017)
Chloe	Dana Delany	Uma Thurman
Peter	Steven Culp	Marton Csokas
Tom	Steven Weber	Josh Lucas
Jeanette	Linda Gehringer	Blair Brown
Rebecca	Rebecca Mozo	Phillipa Soo

== Critical response ==
Marilyn Stasio, in her review for Variety wrote of Thurman that "the effort to play the naughty heroine in a drawing room comedy (which is how director Pam MacKinnon has misdirected her) is beyond her skill set....he [Willimon] fails to draw on any of the many issues bedeviling the president and his minions, missing his chance to turn this mannered trifle into a substantive political drama."

The Guardian reviewer wrote: "The play’s at its best when characters trade wisecracks about Beltway politics and make shrewd observations about what motivates its power-hungry practitioners; it’s at its worst when it reaches higher, for emotional beats that feel clunky and strained..." and noted Thurman's "electric presence".
