= Hysterical Blindness (film) =

2002 American television film

- Promotional poster
- Genre: Drama
- Based on: Hysterical Blindness by Laura Cahill
- Written by: Laura Cahill
- Directed by: Mira Nair
- Starring: Uma Thurman; Gena Rowlands; Juliette Lewis; Ben Gazzara
- Music by: Lesley Barber
- Country of origin: United States
- Original language: English

Production
- Executive producers: Uma Thurman; Jason Blum; Amy Israel
- Producer: Lydia Dean Pilcher
- Cinematography: Declan Quinn
- Editor: Kristina Boden
- Running time: 96 minutes
- Production company: Blum Israel Productions

Original release
- Network: HBO
- Release: January 16, 2002

Hysterical Blindness is a 2002 American television drama film directed by Mira Nair and written by Laura Cahill, based on her stage play of the same name. It stars Gena Rowlands, Uma Thurman, Juliette Lewis, and Ben Gazzara. The film premiered at the Sundance Film Festival on January 16, 2002, and aired on HBO on August 21, 2002. In 2003, Uma Thurman won a Golden Globe Award for her portrayal of Debby Miller. Ben Gazzara and Gena Rowlands also won Best Supporting Actor/Actress awards for their performances as Virginia Miller and Nick Piccolo at the 2003 Emmy Awards. The opening titles by Trollbäck + Company won a Primetime Emmy Award for Outstanding Main Title Design in 2003.

Thurman plays an excitable New Jersey woman searching for romance in the 1980s. The San Francisco Chronicle review wrote: "Thurman so commits herself to the role, eyes blazing and body akimbo, that you start to believe that such a creature could exist—an exquisite looking woman so spastic and needy that she repulses regular Joes. Thurman has bent the role to her will."

== Plot ==
In 1987 in Bayonne, New Jersey, Debby Miller has been diagnosed with the condition hysterical blindness in which there are times when her sight fades in and out. The doctor tells her to try to have fun with her friends. She and her best friend Beth go to their favorite bar, Ollie's, and try to find a man and have a drink. Beth flirts with the bartender, and Debby grows angry with her and goes outside where she meets Rick. He wants little to do with her, but she convinces him to escort her to her car. As a 'thank you,' she offers to buy him a drink and tells him that she will be at the same bar tomorrow.

The next day, they see each other at Ollie's, and she asks him to go somewhere else; eventually they are at his house. It is clear that Rick has little interest in Debby, so to move things along, she tells him that she 'gives a great blow job.' Afterward, she thinks she has found love, but Rick is only looking for a one-night stand. Debby goes home.

Her mother Virginia has been dating an older man, Nick, who wants her to move with him to Florida. However, Nick dies from a heart attack. Virginia realizes that until she met Nick, she lived her life waiting for things to happen to her. In the end, Debby, Beth, and Virginia struggle to find stability and agree that all they need is each other.

== Cast ==
- Uma Thurman as Debby Miller
- Gena Rowlands as Virginia Miller
- Juliette Lewis as Beth Toczynski
- Ben Gazzara as Nick Piccolo
- Justin Chambers as Rick
- Jolie Peters as Amber Autumn Toczynski

== Critical reception ==
On review aggregate website Rotten Tomatoes, Hysterical Blindness has an approval rating of 75% based on 12 critics' reviews.

The film received acclaim for its performances, particularly that of Thurman, Rowlands, Lewis, and Gazzara. Caryn James of The New York Times wrote, "Beneath big hair, tight clothes and thick New Jersey accents, [Thurman and Lewis] bring enormous empathy to their roles in this small-scale, beautifully made character study about two best friends in their 20s." James also praised the direction of Mira Nair, saying she brings to the film "a quality that has been consistent throughout her career: a strong feel for the texture of a life and the people who struggle through it." Chris Gore of Film Threat said Thurman and Lewis "give what can easily be considered career-best performances." In more critical reviews, the plot was criticized as "too thin" and the cast "far superior to the film itself."

== Accolades ==
Award	Category	Subject	Result	Ref.
Primetime Emmy Award (2003 Emmy Awards)	Outstanding Supporting Actor in a Miniseries or a Movie	Ben Gazzara	Won	
Primetime Emmy Award (2003 Emmy Awards)	Outstanding Supporting Actress in a Miniseries or a Movie	Gena Rowlands	Won	
Primetime Emmy Award (2003 Emmy Awards)	Outstanding Main Title Design	Laurent Fauchere, Antoine Tinguely, Chris Haak, Jakob Trollbeck	Won	
Primetime Emmy Award (2003 Emmy Awards)	Outstanding Casting for a Miniseries or a Movie	Sheila Jaffe, Georgianne Walken	Nominated	
Primetime Emmy Award (2003 Emmy Awards)	Outstanding Cinematography for a Miniseries or a Movie	Declan Quinn	Nominated	
Primetime Emmy Award (2003 Emmy Awards)	Outstanding Supporting Actress in a Miniseries or a Movie	Juliette Lewis	Nominated	
Primetime Emmy Award (2003 Emmy Awards)	Outstanding Writing for a Miniseries or a Movie	Laura Cahill	Nominated	
Screen Actors Guild Awards	Outstanding Performance by a Female Actor in a Miniseries or Television Movie	Uma Thurman	Nominated	
Casting Society of America	Best Casting for TV Movie of the Week	Sheila Jaffe, Georgianne Walken	Nominated	
Film Independent Spirit Awards	Best First Screenplay	Laura Cahill	Nominated	
Film Independent Spirit Awards	Best Supporting Female	Juliette Lewis	Nominated	
Golden Globe Awards	Best Actress – Miniseries or Television Film	Uma Thurman	Won	
Golden Globe Awards	Best Supporting Actress – Series, Miniseries or Television Film	Gena Rowlands	Nominated	
Marrakech International Film Festival	Golden Star (Étoile d’or)/Grand prix	Mira Nair	Nominated	
Writers Guild of America Awards	Long Form – Adapted	Laura Cahill (teleplay)	Nominated	
