= Mia Wallace =

Fictional character in Pulp Fiction

- Pulp Fiction character
- Uma Thurman as Mia at Jack Rabbit Slims
- Created by: Quentin Tarantino; Roger Avary
- Portrayed by: Uma Thurman; Other: Rumer Willis; Lizzy Caplan; Lindsey Gort; Ginifer King

In-universe information
- Occupation: Actress (formerly)
- Spouse: Marsellus Wallace
- Nationality: American

Mia Wallace is a fictional character portrayed by Uma Thurman in the 1994 Quentin Tarantino film Pulp Fiction. It was Thurman's breakthrough role and earned her a nomination for the Academy Award for Best Supporting Actress. The character became a cultural icon.

Mia was the featured character of the film's promotional material, appearing on a bed with a cigarette in hand.

== Casting ==
At the beginning of casting Tarantino and Miramax were considering Isabella Rossellini and Meg Ryan for the part. Other actresses considered included Daryl Hannah, Joan Cusack, Halle Berry, Julia Louis-Dreyfus, Holly Hunter and Alfre Woodard. Tarantino preferred Michelle Pfeiffer who auditioned for the role. Kate Beckinsale also auditioned.

Rosanna Arquette was considered but ended up portraying Jody in the film. Her sister Patricia was one of Tarantino's choices to play Mia as well. Other actresses on the list were Virginia Madsen, Marisa Tomei, Jennifer Beals, Pam Grier, Phoebe Cates, Bridget Fonda, Jasmine Guy, Angela Bassett, Annette O'Toole, Debra Winger, Robin Wright, Meg Tilly, Madonna, Cynda Williams and N'Bushe Wright.

Thurman's agent Jay Moloney read a copy of the screenplay and felt Mia was perfect for her. Thurman, however, was not as confident the role was right for her. She found the script frightening and vulgar. In spite of her misgivings she met Tarantino for a three-hour lunch in Los Angeles, and later an hours long discussion in her New York apartment.

== Character design ==
Mia was modeled after actress Anna Karina, a prominent figure of the French New Wave and muse of Jean-Luc Godard. For Mia's look in the film, costume designer Betsy Heimann created her appearance to be that of a female Reservoir Dog. She also included designer name brands like Chanel to show that she is the moll of a rich crime boss. Additionally her look was inspired by silent film stars and meant to invoke a femme fatale. Mia's personality and looks are also reminiscent of Elvira Hancock from Brian De Palma's Scarface.

== Events of Pulp Fiction ==
=== "Vincent Vega and Marsellus Wallace's Wife" ===
Mia is the wife of the crime boss Marsellus Wallace. Before meeting Marsellus, Mia was an aspiring actress who appeared in a television pilot called Fox Force Five, which failed.

Marsellus goes out of town and asks Vincent Vega, one of his assassins, to take Mia out to dinner while he's gone. Vincent agrees, although he is worried about how it will look; when asked about taking her out, he repeatedly insists that "it's not a date". His friend and partner-in-crime and fellow hitman Jules Winnfield warns him not to forget his place, and tells him a story about Antwan "Tony Rocky Horror" Rockamora, one of Marsellus' men whom Marsellus threw out of a four-story window, supposedly because he gave Mia a foot massage.

When Vincent goes to pick Mia up at Marsellus's lavish house, she speaks to him over the intercom as she snorts cocaine in a separate room. The two then head to dinner at Jack Rabbit Slim's, a 1950s-themed restaurant. During dinner, Mia and Vincent talk about subjects such as awkward silences, her acting career, 1950s and 1960s pop culture, and some gossip related to Vincent's business associates. When Vincent brings up what happened to Rockamora, Mia says that "The only thing Tony ever touched of mine was my hand when he shook it on my wedding day". Suddenly, the restaurant's DJ announces a twist contest, and Mia wants to win the trophy for first place. Though Vincent is reluctant, he gets up and dances the twist with Mia to Chuck Berry's "You Never Can Tell".

When Mia and Vincent return to the house to celebrate, Vincent goes to the bathroom while Mia dances Urge Overkill's cover of "Girl, You'll Be a Woman Soon". While Vincent contemplates what to do next in the bathroom, Mia finds a small bag of heroin inside Vincent's coat pocket, and snorts it, thinking that it is cocaine. When Vincent returns from the bathroom, he finds Mia overdosing on the couch, and frantically drives her to the house of his dealer, Lance, in an effort to save her. Lance gets an adrenaline shot, which Vincent administers directly into Mia's heart, and instantly resuscitates her and saves her life.

The two return to the Wallace house after the overdose. Vincent and Mia agree not to tell Marsellus about what happened, as it would surely mean big trouble for both of them, and she finally tells Vincent her Fox Force Five joke.

=== "The Gold Watch" ===
When the boxer Butch Coolidge double-crosses Marsellus by winning a fixed fight, Marcellus sends Vincent to kill him. Vincent sees Mia in the room with Marsellus, and Mia thanks him for dinner the day before.

=== "The Bonnie Situation" ===
Mia is seen briefly in a swimcap and one-piece bathing suit next to the Wallace's swimming pool as her husband Marsellus talks to Jules on the phone.

== Raven McCoy ==
Raven McCoy was Mia's character on Fox Force Five. She is the deadliest woman in the world with a knife, raised by circus performers, who knows a massive amount of old jokes she learned from her grandfather, a Vaudeville performer. McCoy is a reference to three X-Men characters. Her first name comes from Raven Darkhölme and her last from Hank McCoy. Her background is the same as Nightcrawler's who was also raised by circus performers. The series itself came from The Doll Squad.

== Cultural impact ==
=== Other portrayals and character inspiration ===
In 2014, for the 20th anniversary of Pulp Fiction a play was produced based on the films of Tarantino. In it Mia Wallace was played by Rumer Willis, daughter of Bruce Willis. Willis rotated the portrayal with Lindsey Gort and Ginifer King on different nights. Lizzy Caplan portrayed Mia in a staged 2014 live reading of the Pulp Fiction screenplay.

Although her character was named "The Blonde Fox" (a different character than Wallace's on Fox Force Five), actress Evan Rachel Wood played a character inspired by Wallace and Thurman's character Beatrix "The Bride" Kiddo from Tarantino's Kill Bill for a 2019 stage musical based on Tarantino's films and featuring music from his films, titled Fox Force Five and the Tyranny of Evil Men. The Blonde Fox was later portrayed by Lindsey Gort in a 2021 version of the play.

The character of Jane Margolis (Krysten Ritter) from the TV series Breaking Bad was inspired by Mia. In the 1997 parody film Plump Fiction a satirical version of Mia was played by Julie Brown. In the second season of Community for the episode "Critical Film Studies" the character Britta Perry (Gillian Jacobs) dresses as Mia for a Pulp Fiction party. In an episode of All-American Girl titled Pulp Sitcom guest starring Tarantino, Margaret Cho spoofs Mia, including the dance scene and drawing the air square.

=== Fox Force Five ===
After Margot Robbie asked Tarantino for permission, Fox Force Five became the working title for her 2020 film Birds of Prey. Robbie said, "The five prominent women in Birds of Prey lined up perfectly with Fox Force Five." Lisa Rinna, Teddi Mellencamp Arroyave, Kyle Richards, Dorit Kemsley and Erika Girardi of The Real Housewives of Beverly Hills publicly adopted Fox Force Five as a term to refer to themselves. In 2022, the film The 355 was released starring Jessica Chastain. It is "essentially a reimagined Fox Force Five."

The musical girl group The Spice Girls played characters inspired by the Fox Force Five for the music video to their 2nd single from their 1996 album Spice, "Say You'll Be There". A year later in their 1997 film Spice World, the group pays homage to Fox Force Five with a film-within-the-film called Spice Force Five. In The Lego Batman Movie, Batman (Will Arnett) discusses possible team names and mentions Fox Force Five.

=== Fashion and style ===
Mia's look became iconic and an influence in women's fashion for years to come. Cosmetics and fragrance lines from Urban Decay of L'Oréal and Tom Ford have been named and designed after her. Her outfit influenced fashion shows and designs from Marc Jacobs, Jil Sander, Tom Ford, Rag & Bone and Kate Sylvester. In 2021, Korean singer Jennie did a photo shoot for Elle Korea as Mia Wallace.

Mia's outfit also became one of the most popular Halloween costumes for decades to come. Actress Anya Taylor-Joy stated she has dressed up as Mia multiple times and that it is her "all-time favorite costume." Major retailers including Amazon and Walmart sell Mia Wallace Halloween costumes.

=== Music ===
In 2012, rapper Wiz Khalifa released the Taylor Allderdice mixtape featuring the track "Mia Wallace". In 2015, the rock band Fall Out Boy released the single "Uma Thurman", influenced by Mia Wallace, The Bride from Kill Bill and Dick Dale's "Misirlou" which was featured in Pulp Fiction. The chorus of the song is about Mia and Vincent Vega's dance scene. Fall Out Boy and Wiz Khalifa performed "Uma Thurman" live at the 2015 Billboard Music Awards featuring 12 dancers dressed as Mia Wallace. Also in 2015, rapper Lucki released his album X with the seventh track being named after her. In 2017, the French rapper Zola also made a song referring to him named Mia Wallace featuring with 67%.

== Dance scene ==
The famous dance scene between Mia and Vincent Vega took inspiration from Disney's 1970 animated film The Aristocats and a scene from Jean-Luc Godard's 1964 film Bande à part featuring Anna Karina and Claude Brasseur. It also took inspiration from a scene in Federico Fellini's 8½ featuring Barbara Steele and Mario Pisu.

The Mia-Vincent dance scene was imitated in the films Antz (1998) and Be Cool (2005). The latter with Travolta and Thurman again as different characters.

The dance scene was also featured in the Billy and Mandy episode and in K-pop girl group Twice’s music video for their single "What is Love?".

== Reception ==
=== Critical response ===
Peter Travers of Rolling Stone wrote that Uma Thurman's performance "is marvelous here, seductively scrappy as she teases Vincent."

=== Character analysis ===
Jason Bailey saw Mia as someone who easily controlled men. He thought she was manipulative but also very self-aware and someone who "easily transcend[ed]" her image. He compared three other characters to Mia: Phyllis Dietrichson (Barbara Stanwyck) in Double Indemnity; Kitty Collins (Ava Gardner) in The Killers; Gilda Farrell (Rita Hayworth) in Gilda.

=== Awards ===
Thurman was nominated for both the Academy Award for Best Supporting Actress and the Golden Globe Award for the Best Supporting Actress for her performance as Mia Wallace.
