= According to Pereira =

- Italian: Sostiene Pereira
- Directed by: Roberto Faenza
- Written by: Roberto Faenza; Sergio Vecchio
- Produced by: Franco Committeri
- Starring: Marcello Mastroianni; Joaquim de Almeida; Daniel Auteuil; Nicoletta Braschi; Stefano Dionisi
- Cinematography: Blasco Giurato
- Edited by: Ruggero Mastroianni
- Music by: Ennio Morricone
- Release date: 6 April 1995
- Running time: 104 Min
- Countries: Italy; Portugal
- Languages: Italian; Portuguese

According to Pereira (Italian: Sostiene Pereira, French: Pereira prétend, Afirma Pereira in Portugal and Páginas da revolução in Brazil) is a 1995 Italian drama film directed by Roberto Faenza. It is based on Antonio Tabucchi's novel Sostiene Pereira.

Marcello Mastroianni won the David di Donatello as Best Actor.

== Plot ==
In Lisbon, during the António de Oliveira Salazar's Estado Novo dictatorship, Pereira (Marcello Mastroianni), a journalist who works in the culture section of a newspaper, discovers the real dark side of the regime when he meets and helps an anti-fascist young man, Monteiro Rossi (Stefano Dionisi).

== Cast ==
- Marcello Mastroianni - Pereira
- Joaquim de Almeida - Manuel
- Daniel Auteuil - Dr. Cardoso
- Stefano Dionisi - Monteiro Rossi
- Nicoletta Braschi - Marta
- Marthe Keller - Mrs. Delgado
- Teresa Madruga - Portiera
- Nicolau Breyner - Father António
- Filipe Ferrer - Silva
- João Grosso - Police Chief
- Mário Viegas - Newspaper Editor
- Manuela Cassola
- Fátima Marques
- Rui Otero
- Pedro Efe
