= Tape (2001 film) =

2001 film by Richard Linklater

- Theatrical release poster
- Directed by: Richard Linklater
- Screenplay by: Stephen Belber
- Based on: Tape by Stephen Belber
- Produced by: Gary Winick; Anne Walker-McBay; Alexis Alexanian
- Starring: Ethan Hawke; Robert Sean Leonard; Uma Thurman
- Cinematography: Maryse Alberti
- Edited by: Sandra Adair
- Production company: Tape Productions
- Distributed by: Lions Gate Films
- Release dates: January 26, 2001 (Sundance); November 2, 2001
- Running time: 86 minutes
- Country: United States
- Language: English
- Budget: $100,000
- Box office: $515,900

Tape is a 2001 American camcorder drama film directed by Richard Linklater and written by Stephen Belber, based on his play of the same name. It stars Ethan Hawke, Robert Sean Leonard, and Uma Thurman. The entire film takes place in real time.

== Plot ==
The entire film is set inside a Lansing, Michigan motel room. Vince, a drug dealer and volunteer firefighter who lives in Oakland, California, rents the room in his hometown to support his old high school friend's entry into the Lansing Film Festival.

His friend, documentary filmmaker Jon Salter, joins Vince in his motel room and the two reminisce about their high school years. At first, the two are happy to see one another, but friction soon develops. Eventually, they get on the subject of Amy, Vince's former girlfriend. It appears that, while they dated for some time, Vince and Amy never had sex. However, after or at the point when their relationship had ended, Amy slept with Jon.

Vince claims Amy had told him that Jon had raped her. Vince becomes obsessed with, and eventually succeeds in getting a verbal confession from Jon. Immediately after Jon's admission, Vince pulls out a hidden tape recorder that had been recording their whole conversation, much to Jon's horror. Vince then tells Jon that he has invited Amy to dinner, and that she will be arriving shortly.

Amy does arrive and, even though all three of them feel awkward, they begin to talk. Amy explains that she is now an assistant district attorney in the Lansing Justice Department. Eventually, the three discuss what actually happened between Jon and Amy that night at the party, 10 years in the past.

Jon asks Amy's forgiveness for raping her, but Amy claims that the encounter was consensual, leading Jon to believe that she is in denial or is toying with him. After Jon becomes annoyed that Amy is refusing to accept his apology, Amy calls the police. She asks for a squad car to pick up one person in possession of drugs (Vince), and one for “sexual misconduct” (Jon). After concluding her phone call, Amy warns the men that they only have about four minutes to make a run for it.

In order to prove to Amy that he is truly remorseful, Jon decides to stay and wait for the police. Vince, realizing that there is nowhere for him to run, flushes his narcotics down the toilet and destroys the tape containing Jon's confession. Soon after, Amy reveals that she didn't really call the police and leaves.

== Cast ==
- Ethan Hawke as Vince
- Robert Sean Leonard as Jon Salter
- Uma Thurman as Amy Randall

== Critical reception ==
The reviews of the film have been generally favorable; it currently holds a 77% rating on Rotten Tomatoes based on 100 collected reviews, the critical consensus reads: "Tape's stagebound feel is balanced by the engrossing psychodrama of its storyline, which allows a committed cast to shine." It has a weighted average score of 71 out of 100 on Metacritic.

Film critic Roger Ebert said "Tape made me believe that its events could happen to real people more or less as they appear on the screen, and that is its most difficult accomplishment" and gave this film three and a half out of four stars, concluding that "for audiences they are stimulating; for other filmmakers, instruction manuals about how to use the tricky new tools."

Stephen Holden of The New York Times called the film "incisive" and praised the cast for giving "the most psychologically acute performances of their film careers".

Entertainment Weekly critic Owen Gleiberman gave the film an A− and wrote "in Tape, Ethan Hawke releases his inner actor, and it's a kick to see."
