= My Super Ex-Girlfriend =

2006 film directed by Ivan Reitman

- Theatrical release poster
- Directed by: Ivan Reitman
- Written by: Don Payne
- Produced by: Arnon Milchan; Gavin Polone
- Starring: Uma Thurman; Luke Wilson; Anna Faris; Eddie Izzard; Rainn Wilson; Wanda Sykes
- Cinematography: Don Burgess
- Edited by: Wendy Greene Bricmont; Sheldon Kahn
- Music by: Teddy Castellucci
- Production companies: Regency Enterprises; New Regency; Pariah
- Distributed by: 20th Century Fox
- Release date: July 21, 2006
- Running time: 96 minutes
- Country: United States
- Language: English
- Budget: $30 million
- Box office: $61.1 million

My Super Ex-Girlfriend is a 2006 American superhero romantic comedy film directed by Ivan Reitman and starring Uma Thurman and Luke Wilson with Anna Faris, Eddie Izzard, Rainn Wilson and Wanda Sykes in supporting roles. The film follows a corporate man (Wilson) who dumps his superhero girlfriend (Thurman) for her neediness, after which she uses her powers to ruin his life. My Super Ex-Girlfriend was released by 20th Century Fox on July 21, 2006. The film received mixed reviews from critics and grossed $61.1 million.

== Plot ==
After foiling a purse snatcher who steals Jenny Johnson's purse on the subway, Matthew Saunders becomes her "hero" and starts dating her. After several dates, Jenny displays increasingly neurotic and aggressive behavior, becoming more demanding and ultimately injuring Matt and destroying his bed the first time they have sex.

Soon after, Jenny reveals to him that she is in fact the voluptuous blonde superheroine G-Girl, who received superpowers after being exposed to radiation from a crashed meteorite as a teenager, including supernatural strength, speed, senses and invulnerability, along with flight, super breath and heat vision. She becomes more controlling after revealing her powers and Matt is overwhelmed.

Hannah Lewis, Matt's beautiful co-worker, flirts with him, although she is going out with a handsome but shallow underwear model. As their friendship develops further, and after becoming aggravated with Jenny's escalating jealousy, Matt ends their relationship.

An enraged Jenny vows to make Matt regret it. She uses her superpowers to publicly embarrass him, throwing his car into space and eventually causing him to lose his job as an architect by stripping him naked during an important meeting.

Professor Bedlam was formerly Jenny's high school boyfriend, Barry Lambert. While about to become intimate they were interrupted by the crash of the meteor. He saw her obtain superpowers, then watched and became embittered as she ignored him for other men, something her new charisma made possible. Consequently, he studied to be a supervillain and is now G-Girl's nemesis.

Bedlam contacts Matt to enlist his aid in defeating her. He refuses and makes plans to leave the city. As Matt does, Hannah contacts him. She has broken up with her cheating boyfriend, and after confessing their feelings to each other, they end up sleeping together.

Jenny (as G-Girl) finds them in bed the next day. Enraged and jealous, she attacks them with a great white shark. Fed up, Matt contacts Professor Bedlam; at his house he accidentally sees a room in which he has a shrine showing his secret continuing adoration of Jenny. Matt agrees to help him defeat her, as long as Bedlam retires from being a supervillain.

Matt must lure Jenny to another meteorite that will draw away her powers, leaving her a normal woman. He agrees and meets her for a candlelit dinner at his apartment, under the pretense of wanting to resume their relationship.

Hannah arrives to see Jenny sitting on Matt's lap. The two women fight, and in the struggle, Jenny's superhero identity is revealed to Hannah. Bedlam's trap is sprung, and Jenny's power is absorbed back into the meteorite, incapacitating her.

Professor Bedlam appears, but reveals that he has no intention of keeping his promise to retire from villainy and in fact plans to take the powers for himself. While he and Matt fight, Jenny crawls to the charged meteorite attempting to regain her powers. Hannah intervenes just as Jenny grabs the meteorite, which explodes in a burst of power.

Both Hannah and Jenny are catapulted off the roof, apparently to their deaths; Jenny appears within seconds, powers restored, threatening even more mayhem. Hannah unexpectedly reappears, having also been exposed to the meteorite and gained the same powers as G-Girl. She saves Matt, and the second fight between Hannah and Jenny is a full-on brawl, destroying part of the neighboring properties.

Matt ends the fight at a fashion show by revealing to Jenny that Bedlam loves her and making her realize that he is her true love. She is softened and embraces her former nemesis as the spectators cheer.

The next morning, Matt and Hannah meet up with Professor Bedlam (now just "Barry") and Jenny. As cries for help are heard from afar, Jenny and Hannah, now partners in crime-fighting, take off to tackle the emergency. Matt and Barry are left holding their girlfriends' purses and clothes and leave to have a beer together.

== Cast ==
- Uma Thurman as Jennifer Johnson / G-Girl
- Luke Wilson as Matt Saunders
- Anna Faris as Hannah Lewis
- Eddie Izzard as Professor Bedlam / Barry Edward Lambert
- Rainn Wilson as Vaughn Haige
- Wanda Sykes as Carla Dunkirk

In addition, Stelio Savante and Mike Iorio portray Bedlam's hired goons, Leo and Lenny, respectively, while, in cameo appearances, Mark Consuelos plays Hannah's shallow boyfriend and Margaret Anne Florence portrays the bartender who Vaughn has sex with.

== Production ==
Writer Don Payne conceived of the idea of his first film while working on The Simpsons television series, saying that as a fan of comics, the idea of a romantic comedy with a superhero twist was "a fitting first feature". The spec script (at that time called Super Ex) attracted the attention of production company Regency Enterprises and director Ivan Reitman, and the film was fast-tracked for production. Filming took place over four weeks in New York City and featured Westchester high school Port Chester High School for the main characters' high school scenes.

In a 2022 interview, Faris stated her displeasure at working on the film with Reitman:

One of my hardest film experiences was with Ivan Reitman. The idea of attempting to make a comedy under this reign of terror. He was a yeller. He would bring down somebody every day. And my first day, it was me.

== Release ==
=== Home media ===
My Super Ex-Girlfriend was released on DVD on December 19, 2006, and on Blu-ray on May 28, 2013.

== Reception ==
=== Critical response ===
On the review aggregator website Rotten Tomatoes, 40% of 129 critics' reviews are positive, with an average rating of 5.1/10. The website's consensus reads: "My Super Ex-Girlfriend is an only sporadically amusing spoof on the superhero genre that misses the mark with a nerd-turned-superwoman who embodies sexist clichés." Metacritic, which uses a weighted average, assigned the film a score of 50 out of 100, based on 28 critics, indicating "mixed or average" reviews. Audiences polled by CinemaScore gave the film an average grade of "C+" on an A+ to F scale.

Peter Travers of Rolling Stone wrote: "If the script for this comic spin on Fatal Attraction (1987) were only a tenth as hot as Uma Thurman, director Ivan Reitman might have had something here." Robert Koehler of Variety praised Thurman's performance: "Uma Thurman, a female superhero with emotional problems and dating issues, doesn't so much fight the forces of evil as battle the wit-starved movie's torpor -- indeed, her perf suggests what the entire film might have been."

Psychologist Stephen N. Gold, reviewing the film, has suggested that Jenny/G-Girl has borderline personality disorder.

=== Box office ===
My Super Ex-Girlfriend debuted in the United States and Canada on July 21, 2006, in 2,702 theaters, grossing $8.6 million and finishing at No. 7 at the box office. The film proceeded to gross $22.5 million in the United States and Canada, and $38.6 million in other territories, for a worldwide total of $61.1 million, against a budget of $30 million.
