= Uma Thurman =

American actress (born 1970)

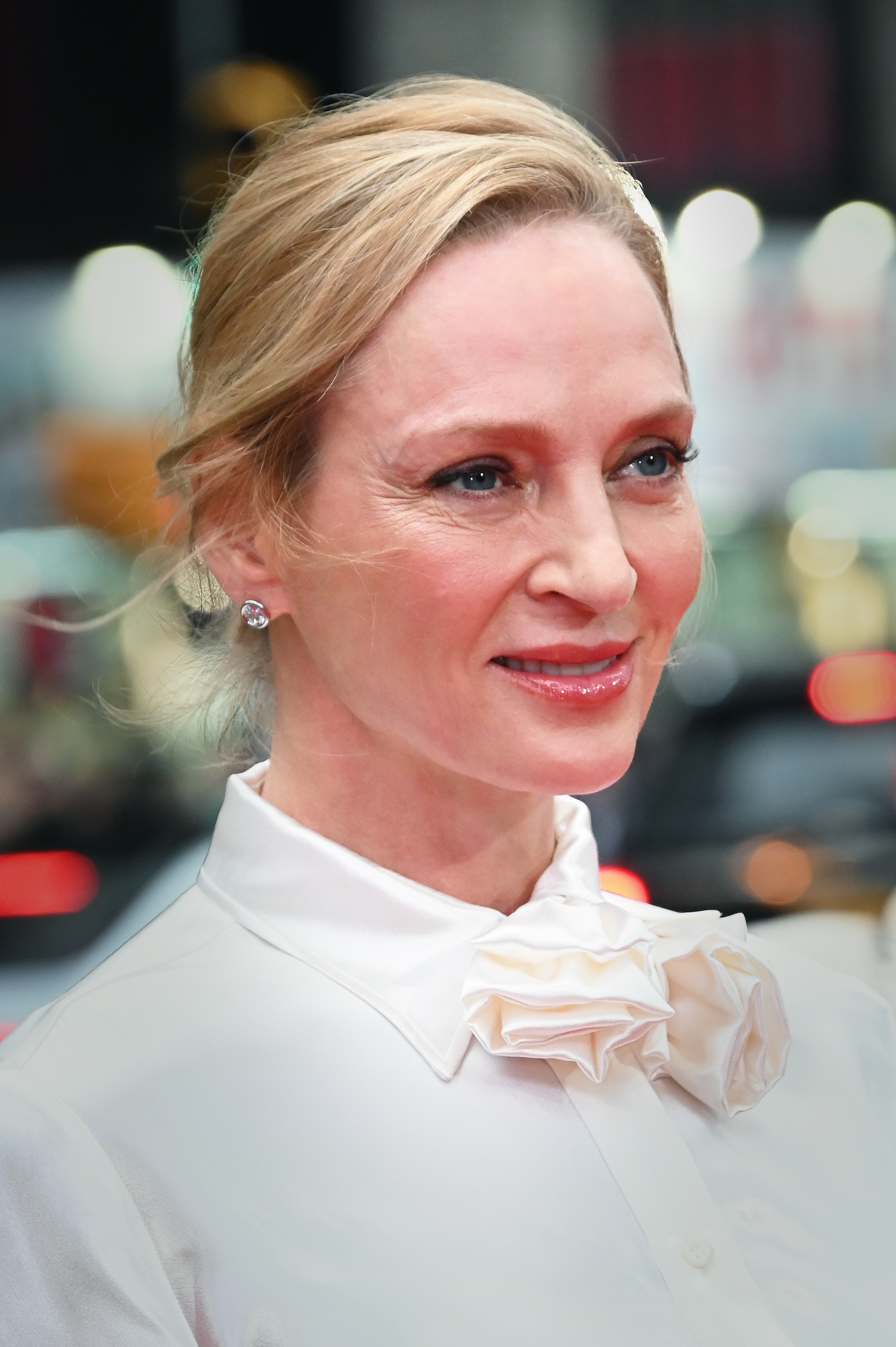
- Thurman in 2025
- Born: Uma Karuna Thurman; April 29, 1970 (age 56); Boston, Massachusetts, U.S.
- Occupations: Actress; model
- Years active: 1985–present
- Works: Full list
- Spouses: Gary Oldman (m. 1990; div. 1992); Ethan Hawke (m. 1998; div. 2005)
- Partner(s): Arpad Busson (2007–2009, 2010–2014)
- Children: 3, including Maya and Levon Hawke
- Parents: Robert Thurman (father); Nena von Schlebrügge (mother)
- Awards: Full list

Uma Karuna Thurman (born April 29, 1970) is an American actress. Known for her collaborations with Quentin Tarantino, she has performed in over fifty film and television productions since the 1980s, across genres that range from comedies and dramas to science fiction and action. Her accolades include a Golden Globe Award and nominations for an Academy Award, two British Academy Film Awards, a Primetime Emmy Award, and two Screen Actors Guild Awards.

Following her appearances in two covers for British Vogue, Thurman starred in Dangerous Liaisons (1988), Henry & June (1990), and Mad Dog and Glory (1993). She rose to international prominence with her portrayal as Mia Wallace in Tarantino's Pulp Fiction (1994), for which she was nominated for the Academy Award for Best Supporting Actress. She reunited with the director to play the Bride in Kill Bill: Volume 1 and 2 (2003–2004), which brought her a BAFTA Award nomination and two additional Golden Globe Award nominations.

Thurman's other film credits include The Truth About Cats & Dogs (1996), Batman & Robin (1997), Gattaca (1997), Les Misérables (1998), Paycheck (2003), The Producers (2005), My Super Ex-Girlfriend (2006), Percy Jackson & the Olympians: The Lightning Thief (2010), Nymphomaniac (2013), The House That Jack Built (2018), Hollywood Stargirl (2022), and The Old Guard 2 (2025). She made her Broadway debut in The Parisian Woman (2017–2018).

Thurman won the Golden Globe Award for Best Actress in a Television Film for her performance in the HBO film Hysterical Blindness (2002) and was nominated for the Primetime Emmy Award for Outstanding Guest Actress in a Drama Series for appearing in the NBC series Smash (2012). On television, she has starred in The Slap (2015), Imposters (2017–2018), Chambers (2019), Super Pumped (2022), and Dexter: Resurrection (2025–present).

== Early life ==
Uma Karuna Thurman was born on April 29, 1970, in Boston, Massachusetts. Her father, Robert Thurman, was a professor of Indo-Tibetan Buddhist Studies and an author who lived as an ordained Buddhist monk for three years. Her mother, Nena von Schlebrügge, a high-fashion model, was born in Mexico City to a German nobleman and Birgit Holmquist, a Swedish model.

Thurman spent altogether around two years in Almora, Uttarakhand, India. She grew up mostly in Amherst, Massachusetts, where she went to Amherst Regional Junior High School, then moved to Woodstock, New York. She has three brothers, Ganden (born 1967), Dechen Karl (born 1973), and Mipam (born 1978), and a half-sister named Taya (born 1961), from her father's previous marriage. Thurman's first cousin once removed is Swedish soccer player Max von Schlebrügge. Thurman has dyslexia, and has been open about her struggles with the condition.

She is described, in a 2004 biography, as having been an awkward and introverted girl who was teased for her appearance and unusual name (sometimes using the name "Uma Karen" instead of her birth name). When Thurman was ten years old, a friend's mother suggested a nose job. As a child, she suffered bouts of body dysmorphic disorder. She attended Amherst Public Schools, where in eighth grade she discovered her love of acting. At age 14, she attended Northfield Mount Hermon School, a preparatory school in Massachusetts, where talent scouts noticed her performance as Abigail in a production of The Crucible and offered her the chance to act professionally; she then dropped out to pursue an acting career.

== Career ==
=== Modeling and acting beginnings (1985–1989) ===
Thurman began her career as a fashion model at age 15, and signed with the agency Click Models. Her early modeling credits included Glamour and the December 1985 and May 1986 covers of British Vogue. She made the transition to acting with her film debut, the teen thriller Kiss Daddy Goodnight, which was released in 1987. Thurman was subsequently cast in three 1988 films — Johnny Be Good, The Adventures of Baron Munchausen and most notably, Dangerous Liaisons. In the comedy Johnny Be Good, she played the girlfriend of a top high school quarterback prospect, and in The Adventures of Baron Munchausen, she made a brief appearance as the goddess Venus; during her entrance she briefly appears nude, in an homage to Botticelli's The Birth of Venus.

In the Oscar-winning drama Dangerous Liaisons, co-starring Glenn Close and John Malkovich, Thurman took on the role of a naive teenager, seduced by a manipulative man. The picture was an arthouse success, and garnered Thurman recognition from critics and audiences; film critic Roger Ebert found her to be "well cast" in her "tricky" key role. At the time, insecure about her appearance, she spent roughly a year in London, during which she often wore loose, baggy clothing. Malkovich said of her, "There is nothing twitchy teenager-ish about her, I haven't met anyone like her at that age. Her intelligence and poise stand out. But there's something else. She's more than a little haunted."

=== Early prominence and Pulp Fiction (1990–1995) ===
In 1990, Thurman appeared with Fred Ward and Maria de Medeiros in Henry & June, a sexually provocative drama about the relationship and affairs between writer Henry Miller and his wife June Miller in 1931 Paris. This film was the first to receive an NC-17 rating and partly because many American newspapers refused to advertise films with the new rating, it did not get wide release in the United States. However, it won Thurman good notices; The New York Times wrote: "Thurman, as the Brooklyn-accented June, takes a larger-than-life character and makes her even bigger, though the performance is often as curious as it is commanding." After playing Maid Marian in the 1991 British adventure film Robin Hood, Thurman began filming Dylan Thomas, a biopic on Welsh poet Dylan Thomas starring her then-husband Gary Oldman with herself as Caitlin Thomas, however the project was shut down shortly after filming began. Thurman went on to star as the patient of a San Francisco psychiatrist in the neo-noir drama Final Analysis (1992), opposite Richard Gere and Kim Basinger, and as a blind woman romantically involved with a former policeman in the thriller Jennifer 8 (also 1992), with Andy García.

Thurman portrayed a young woman with unusually big thumbs in Gus Van Sant's 1993 adaptation of Tom Robbins' novel Even Cowgirls Get the Blues. The film was a critical and commercial failure, eventually earning Thurman a Golden Raspberry Award nomination for Worst Actress. The Washington Post described her acting as shallow and remarked: "Thurman's strangely passive characterization doesn't go much deeper than drawling and flexing her prosthetic thumbs". Also in 1993, she starred as a waitress opposite Robert De Niro and Bill Murray in the drama Mad Dog and Glory and auditioned for Stanley Kubrick while he was casting for his eventually unrealized adaptation of the novel Wartime Lies.

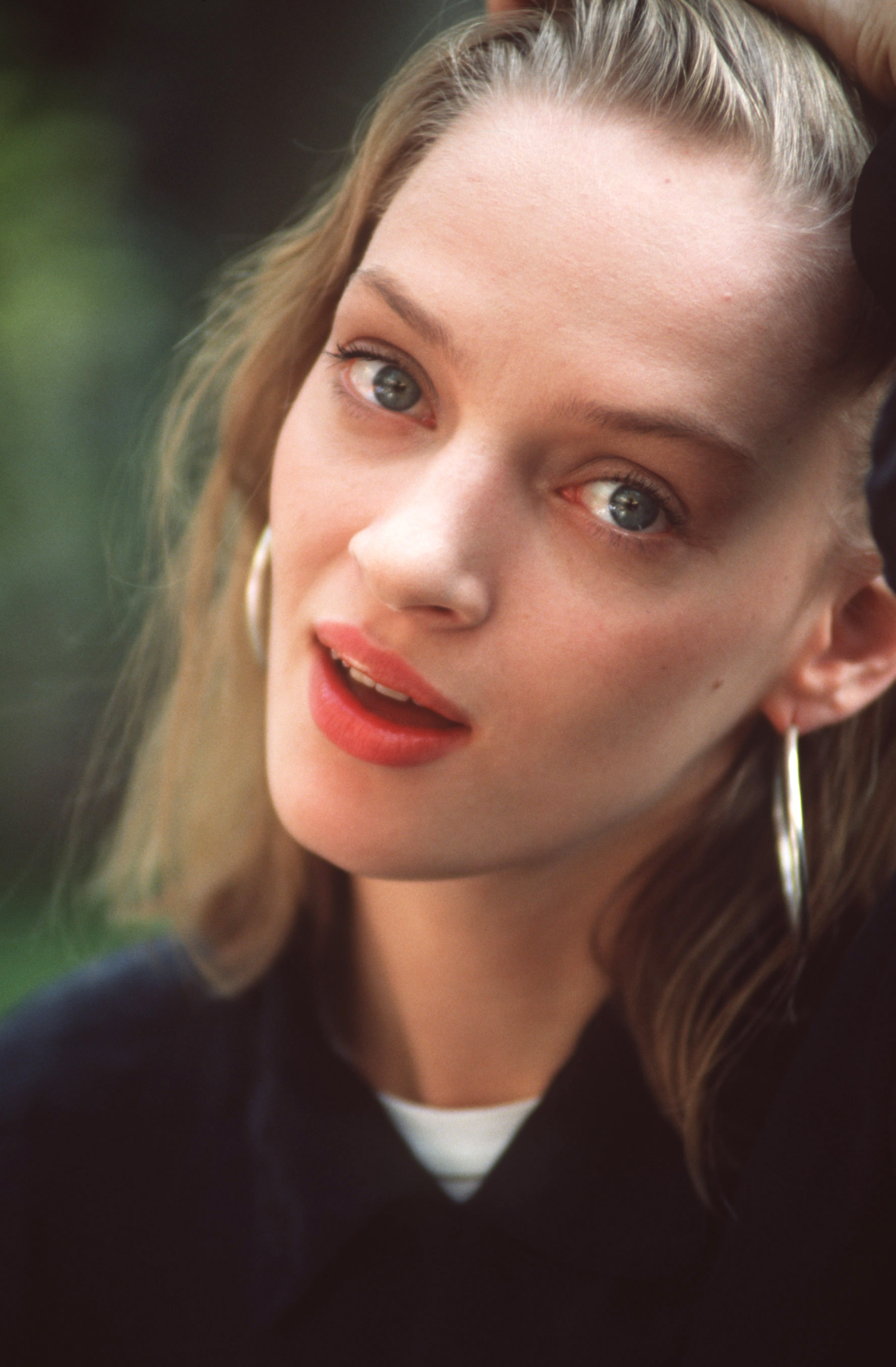
Thurman at the 1994 Venice International Film Festival

In Quentin Tarantino's neo-noir black comedy Pulp Fiction (1994), Thurman played Mia Wallace, the wife of a Los Angeles mobster. Several actresses were considered for the role, but Tarantino wanted Thurman after their first meeting. The film grossed $213.9 million worldwide and received widespread acclaim, appearing on many critics' lists of the greatest films ever made. She dominated most of the movie's promotional material; Mia is considered one of the most iconic female film characters of the 1990s. The Washington Post asserted that Thurman was "serenely unrecognizable in a black wig, [and] is marvelous as a zoned-out gangster's girlfriend". For her performance, Thurman was nominated for the Golden Globe and the Academy Award for Best Supporting Actress and launched into the celebrity A-list. She took little advantage of her new-found fame by choosing not to do any big-budget films for the next three years. In a 2003 interview with Time magazine, Tarantino, who considers Thurman his muse, remarked that she was "up there with Garbo and Dietrich in goddess territory".

=== Established career (1996–2002) ===
Thurman's next films, the romantic dramedy Beautiful Girls, in which she played a fairly wise love interest, and the comedy The Truth About Cats & Dogs, in which she top-billed as a ditzy blonde model, were modest commercial successes amid a positive critical response upon their theatrical releases in 1996. In 1997, Thurman starred opposite Ethan Hawke in Gattaca, a science fiction film set in a future society driven by eugenics where potential children are conceived through genetic manipulation. The film received critical praise and became successful on the home video market, despite lackluster box office receipts. Her next film role was that of supervillain Poison Ivy in Batman & Robin (1997). Budgeted at $160 million, the film grossed a modest $238 million worldwide and is often considered to be one of the worst films ever made. Thurman's performance, however, was largely highlighted upon the film's release; the Houston Chronicle remarked that "Thurman [...] sometimes seems to be doing Mae West by way of Jessica Rabbit", and a similar comparison was made by The New York Times: "[L]ike Mae West, she mixes true femininity with the winking womanliness of a drag queen". She obtained a Blockbuster Entertainment Award for Best Sci-fi Actress and was also nominated for Favourite Movie Actress at the Kids' Choice Awards.

Thurman took on the role of Fantine in Les Misérables, the 1998 film version of Victor Hugo's novel of the same name, directed by Bille August. The film was considered an "intelligent, handsomely crafted adaptation" of the classic novel, according to Rotten Tomatoes, and on his review of the film, Roger Ebert expressed that "Thurman's performance is the best element" of the story. That year, she also starred as a British secret agent in The Avengers, a notable financial and critical flop; CNN described her as "so distanced you feel like you're watching her through the wrong end of a telescope". In 1999, she performed in theater in an update of Molière's The Misanthrope at the Classic Stage Company, and portrayed a socialite in Woody Allen's romantic dramedy Sweet and Lowdown, opposite Sean Penn. Thurman was in a hiatus from acting at the time as she had her daughter in 1998, doing only a few small, low-budget projects after giving birth; she eventually turned down the role of Éowyn in Peter Jackson's The Lord of the Rings film trilogy, which she considers "one of the worst decisions [she] ever made".

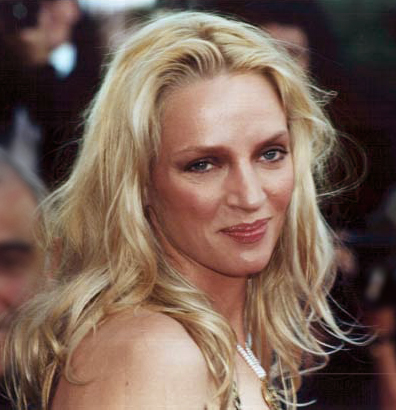
Thurman at the 2000 Cannes Film Festival

Thurman headlined the period drama The Golden Bowl (2000), based on the 1904 novel of the same name by Henry James. In November 2000, she narrated the John Moran opera Book of the Dead (2nd Avenue) at The Public Theater. The historical drama Vatel (2000) saw Thurman play Anne de Montausier, the love interest of 17th-century French chef François Vatel, and in Richard Linklater's real-time drama Tape (2001), she starred as the former girlfriend of a drug dealer and volunteer firefighter (Ethan Hawke). She was nominated for the Independent Spirit Award for Best Supporting Female for her part in Tape. Hawke directed her in Chelsea Walls (2001), a drama revolving a number of artists as they spend a single day in New York's famed bohemian home Chelsea Hotel. Thurman would win a Golden Globe for her performance in the HBO cable film Hysterical Blindness (2002), where she was also one of the executive producers. Thurman played a New Jersey woman in the 1980s searching for romance. In its review, the San Francisco Chronicle remarked: "Thurman so commits herself to the role, eyes blazing and body akimbo, that you start to believe that such a creature could exist—an exquisite-looking woman so spastic and needy that she repulses regular Joes. Thurman has bent the role to her will."

=== Renewed success with Kill Bill (2003–2005) ===
Thurman reunited with Quentin Tarantino for the two-part martial arts action film Kill Bill (2003–2004), portraying assassin Beatrix Kiddo, out for revenge against her former lover. Tarantino wrote the part specifically for her. He cited Thurman as his muse while writing the film, and gave her joint credit for the character, whom the two conceived on the set of Pulp Fiction from the sole image of a bride covered in blood. Thurman's main inspiration for the role was the title character of Coffy (played by Pam Grier) and the character of Gloria Swenson from Gloria (played by Gena Rowlands). She said that both of them are "two of the only women I've ever seen be truly women [while] holding a weapon". Production was delayed for several months after Thurman became pregnant and Tarantino refused to recast the part. The film took nine months to shoot, and was filmed in five different countries. The role was also her most demanding, and she spent three months training in martial arts, swordsmanship, and Japanese. Kill Bill was originally set to be released as one film, however, due to its long running time, it was ultimately released in two parts. Both volumes scored highly with critics and audiences, subsequently developing a cult following. Rolling Stone likened Thurman to "an avenging angel out of a 1940s Hollywood melodrama". She was nominated for two Golden Globes for both entries, plus three MTV Movie Awards for Best Female Performance and two for Best Fight.

By 2005, Thurman had a reported asking price of $12.5 million per film. Besides the children's film The Naked Brothers Band: The Movie, in which Thurman had a cameo, she had three other major film releases throughout 2005. Her first film in the year was the crime-comedy Be Cool, the sequel to 1995's Get Shorty, which reunited her with her Pulp Fiction co-star John Travolta. Despite a lukewarm critical reception, the film grossed $95 million. She next starred in the romantic comedy Prime with Meryl Streep, playing a divorced and lonesome business-woman who enters a relationship with a much younger man (Bryan Greenberg). A modest mainstream success, it eventually grossed $67.9 million internationally. In the remake The Producers (her last 2005 film), Thurman played Ulla, a Swedish stage actress hoping to win a part in a new Broadway musical. She is credited for her songs in the film. While box office receipts were modest, Thurman garnered acclaim from critics; A. O. Scott of The New York Times stated: "Thurman as a would-be actress is the one bit of genuine radiance in this aggressively and pointlessly shiny, noisy spectacle."

=== Commercial fluctuations (2006–2011) ===
In 2006, Thurman starred opposite Luke Wilson in My Super Ex-Girlfriend, playing a superhero who is dumped by her boyfriend and then takes her revenge upon him. She received $14 million for the role, but the film was panned by critics and made a modest $61 million worldwide. Entertainment Weekly wrote that it was a "miscalculation to make Thurman the antagonist. She does a sprightly satiric turn, but [it is] wasted in a movie that would rather tweak male paranoia than liberate a nerdette terrified of her powers". In the 2007 film The Life Before Her Eyes, Thurman starred as an accident survivor whose guilt causes her present-day life to fall apart. It received a limited theatrical release and was dismissed by critics as "a confusing, painfully overwrought melodrama".

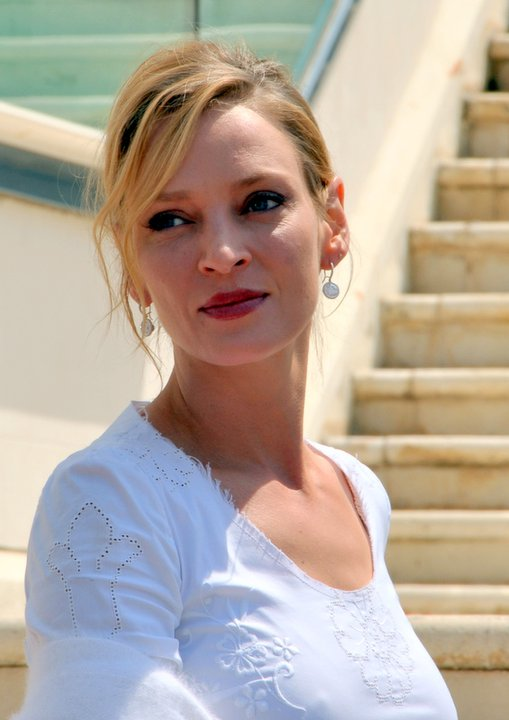
Thurman at the 2011 Cannes Film Festival

In 2008, Thurman starred with Colin Firth and Jeffrey Dean Morgan in The Accidental Husband, a romantic comedy where she played a woman who finds herself married while engaged to another man. Despite theatrical runs abroad, the film was released on DVD in North America due to financial problems with its distributor. She also took on the role of a cocaine addict in the British television drama My Zinc Bed, which garnered what was considered poor ratings, especially given her involvement.

In 2009's Motherhood, she starred as a New York City mother whose dilemmas of marriage, work, and self are shown in the trials and tribulations of one pivotal day. "I've never really played a realistic mom before," she said. Distributed for a limited release to certain parts of the United States only, the independent dramedy garnered just $93,388 in three weeks of release. About Thurman's character and its place in the overall film, New York Times critic A. O. Scott wrote that "Eliza is scattered, ambivalent, flaky and inconsistent—all of which is fine, and energetically conveyed by Ms. Thurman. But what are tolerable quirks in a person can be deadly to a narrative [...] the movie stumbles from loose and scruffy naturalism to sitcom tidiness". Thurman filmed a brief role in the fantasy adaptation Percy Jackson & the Olympians: The Lightning Thief (2010), appearing as Medusa, a gorgon cursed by Athena.

In 2011, she was a member of the jury for the main competition at the Cannes Film Festival, and her only film in the year—Ceremony—was released for VOD and selected theaters after its initial screening at the 2010 Toronto International Film Festival. In the independent comedy, she starred as woman on the eve of her wedding who re-connects with an old fling (played by Michael Angarano). By that time, she had taken on the roles of a powerful and wealthy mistress in the period drama Bel Ami (2012), a trophy wife in the romantic comedy Playing for Keeps (2012), and that of Lois Lane in a segment of the anthology film Movie 43 (2013); all films were panned by critics and flopped at the box office. Writing for the New York Daily News in her review for Ceremony, Elizabeth Weitzman noted: "She gets stuck in so many small, undeserving projects, one has to wonder who's mapping out her career".

=== Transition to television and Broadway debut (2012–2018) ===
Thurman ventured into television in 2012, when she joined the cast of the drama series Smash in its first season, portraying the five-episode role of Rebecca Duvall, a Hollywood actress who wants to star in a new Broadway musical, despite having limited musical ability. Her performance garnered critical acclaim, with The A.V. Club writing: "Uma Thurman is a lot of fun. She gives that character some pop, playing both the shallow, demanding side of celebrity [...] and the sincere, talented side [...]". She earned a Primetime Emmy Award nomination for Outstanding Guest Actress in a Drama Series.

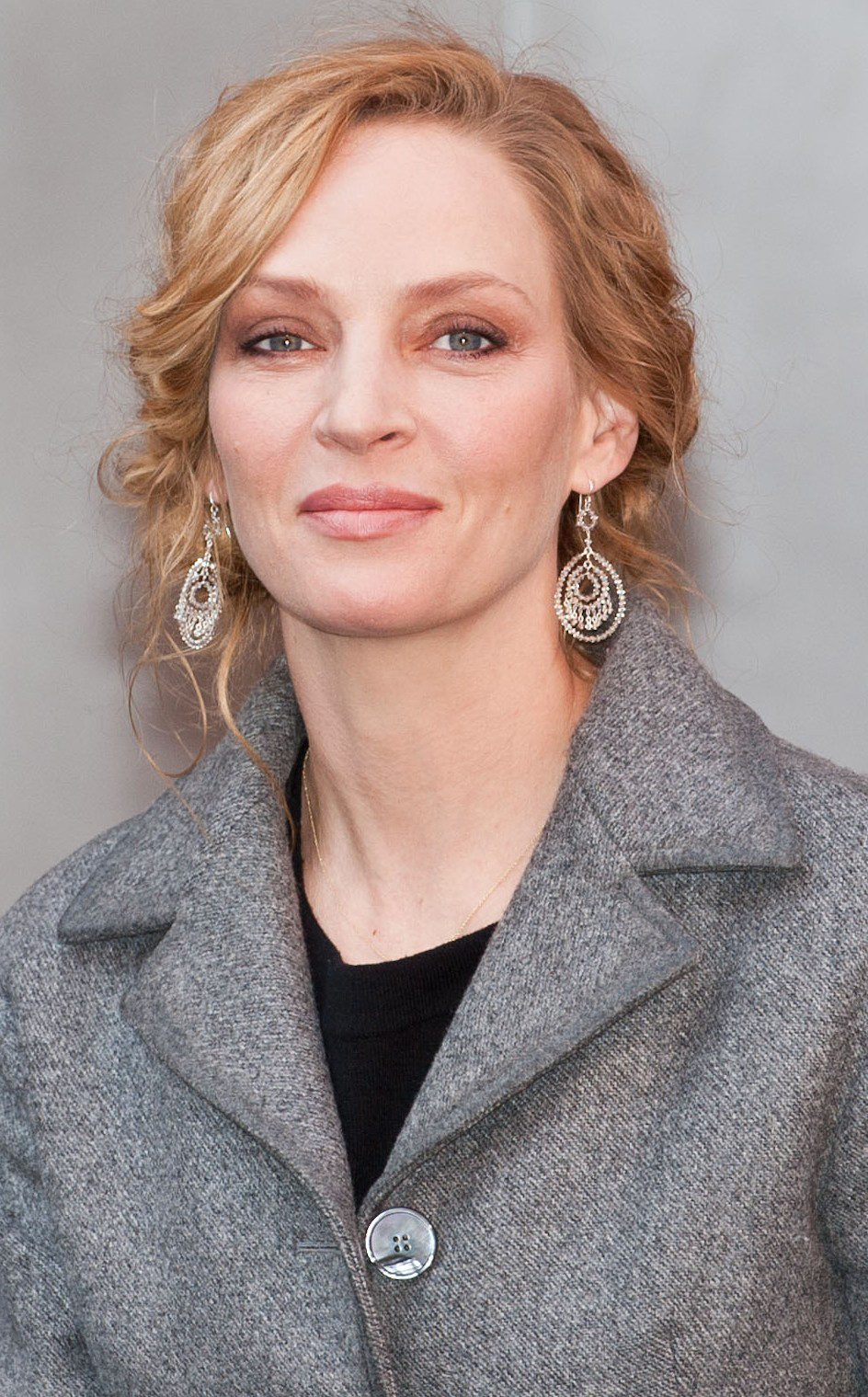
Thurman at the 2014 Berlin International Film Festival

Thurman appeared in the Volume I of Lars von Trier's two-part ensemble art drama Nymphomaniac (2013) as Mrs. H, a rejected wife who confronts her estranged husband. Despite her limited screen time in the film, Rolling Stone remarked that she was "sensational" in a role that defies "[von Trier]'s mixed feelings about female power", while Vanity Fair found her to be "downright terrific", noting that she "lends the character [...] a good deal of dignity". For her part, she received a Bodil Award nomination for Best Supporting Actress, and in 2014, she won the BAMBI Award for Best International Actress.

In 2015, Thurman starred on the NBC miniseries The Slap, the American adaptation of the Australian series of the same name about the fallout after a man slaps another couple's misbehaving child, and played a famed restaurant critic named Simone in the drama Burnt, starring Bradley Cooper. In 2017, Thurman took on the recurring role of a fixer on the Bravo dark comedy series Imposters, which ran for two seasons, and was named president of Cannes Film Festival "Un Certain Regard" jury for "works which offer a unique perspective and aesthetic".

Thurman made her Broadway debut in The Parisian Woman, a play written by Beau Willimon. Set in Washington, D.C., the production saw her star as a socialite coming to terms with politics, her past, her marriage and an uncertain future. The play ran for 141 performances, including previews, between November 2017 and March 2018, garnering a mixed critical response and what was described as "strong" box-office returns by Playbill. The New York Times remarked: "Unlike many actors whose expertise derives from movies, [Thurman] has no trouble fully inhabiting, and projecting, even a jury-rigged character like [hers]. Her intelligence and, it has to be said, her innate glamour, make it possible to care about someone you do not believe in". For her role, she won the Broadway.com Audience Award for Favorite Leading Actress in a Play.

The Con Is On, an independent heist comedy Thurman filmed in 2015, opposite Tim Roth, was released on May 4, 2018. Both actors played a con-artist couple planning a jewel heist in Los Angeles, after escaping from a notorious Russian gangster. She reunited with director Lars von Trier to play the first victim of a serial killer during the 1980s in his psychological horror film The House That Jack Built, which premiered on May 14, 2018, at the Cannes Film Festival. In her next film, the supernatural thriller Down a Dark Hall (2018), directed by Rodrigo Cortés, Uma portrayed the role of Madame Duret, the eccentric headmistress of a mysterious school for troubled girls. In its review for the latter film, Variety noted that she "cuts an elegant figure [...] but her somewhat unconvincing villain could have used more notes of mystery and wit".

=== Television and film roles (2019–present) ===
Thurman played a grieving mother in the Netflix supernatural horror series Chambers, which was released on April 26, 2019. Alex McLevy, writing for The A.V. Club, remarked that she "[sold] the hell out of [her] often absurd role", which he found to be "over-written", as part of an overall mixed response. In 2019, Thurman also received a career honorary award at the David di Donatello Film Awards in Italy, and performed the role of Helene Alving in a revival of Henrik Ibsen's Ghosts at the Williamstown Theatre Festival.

Thurman reunited with Robert De Niro, her co-star in Mad Dog and Glory, for the family comedy The War with Grandpa, in which she portrayed the daughter of his recently widowed character. Originally filmed in May 2017, the film had a lengthy post-production due to the closure of The Weinstein Company, the original distributor, but was eventually released theatrically in North America on October 9, 2020, by 101 Studios. Despite negative reviews, The War with Grandpa made US$40 million worldwide, which was deemed a success amid the COVID-19 pandemic. She served as the narrator of The Age of Nature, a three-part documentary series, which aired on PBS in October 2020.

The Apple TV+ thriller series Suspicion, which premiered on February 4, 2022, featured Thurman as an American media mogul whose son is kidnapped. The production received mixed reviews from critics, who collectively noted that she "was barely in it at all", despite being heavily promoted. She next portrayed Arianna Huffington, the co-founder of The Huffington Post, in The Battle For Uber, the first season of Super Pumped, an anthology drama television series created by Brian Koppelman and David Levien, which debuted on Showtime on February 27, 2022. While Brian Lowry of CNN praised Thurman's efforts at a Greek accent, Adrian Horton of The Guardian described her portrayal as "a cringey caricature" of Huffington. Thurman appeared as Roxanne Martel in the coming-of-age film Hollywood Stargirl, which was released on June 3, 2022, on Disney+.

In 2023, Thurman starred as an art dealer in the crime thriller The Kill Room, alongside Pulp Fiction collaborator Samuel L. Jackson, and as fictional US president Ellen Claremont in the Amazon Prime Video romantic comedy Red, White & Royal Blue. She also joined the cast of the sequel to The Old Guard, alongside Charlize Theron. The Old Guard 2 was released in 2025.

== Public image ==
=== General ===
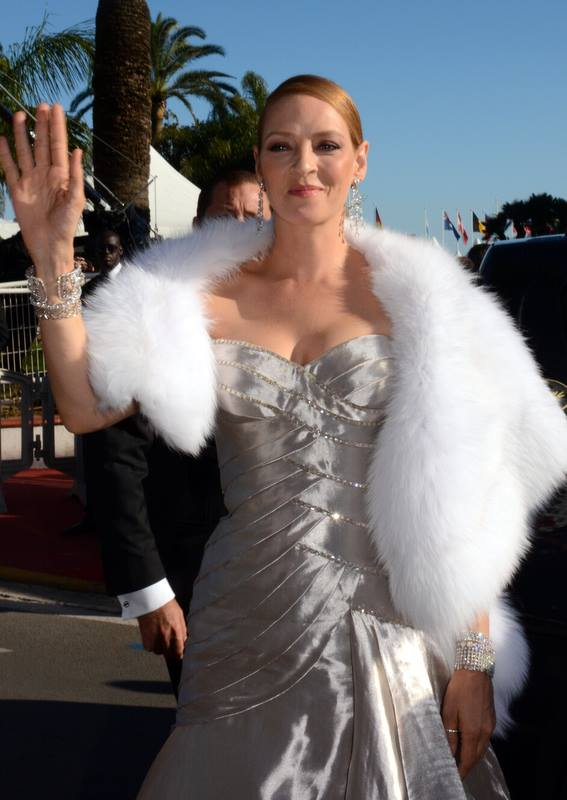
Thurman at the 2013 Cannes Film Festival

Empire included Thurman among "The 100 Sexiest Stars in Film History" in 1995 as well as "The Top 100 Movie Stars of All Time" in 1997. A regular feature on FHM's "100 Sexiest Women in the World" from the late 1990s to the early 2000s, she also ranked at No. 34, No. 21 and No. 30 on the Maxim Hot 100 in 2004, 2005 and 2006 respectively. In 2013, Thurman was named one of the "100 Hottest Women of the 21st Century" by GQ.

On February 7, 2006, Thurman was awarded and named a knight of the Ordre des Arts et des Lettres of France for outstanding achievement in the field of art and literature, and for her work and importance as an actress.

The American rock band Fall Out Boy released a song titled "Uma Thurman" in 2015, celebrating the actress and her roles in Pulp Fiction and Kill Bill. She gave permission for the band to use her name, and during an interview on the Today Show, stated: "It's very, like unbelievably polite and gracious of them. So sweet. I'm so happy for their big success".

In 2020, scientists named a new species of fringe-toed lizard from southwest Arizona (Uma thurmanae) after Thurman.

=== Fashion ===
The lavender Prada dress Thurman wore to the 67th Academy Awards on March 27, 1995, was admired by the media. Stylecaster.com stated that, as a result, "Thurman became known for her stellar fashion sense, while Prada got a huge boost from instant name recognition the world over." Similarly, her crimson Alberta Ferretti dress at the 72nd Academy Awards on March 26, 2000, remains among her most notable, with The Daily Telegraph voting it the 20th greatest red carpet gown of all time. Thurman has been a face and spokeswoman of Lancôme, TAG Heuer, Louis Vuitton, and Parfums Givenchy. She posed for the 2014 Campari Calendar and was among the actresses photographed by Peter Lindbergh for the 2017 Pirelli Calendar.

== Personal life ==
=== Relationships ===
Thurman met English actor Gary Oldman on the set of State of Grace; they married in 1990 and divorced in 1992. On May 1, 1998, she married American actor Ethan Hawke, whom she met on the set of the 1997 film Gattaca. Hawke's novel Ash Wednesday is dedicated to "Karuna", Thurman's middle name. Together, Thurman and Hawke have two children, a daughter, Maya (born in 1998), and a son, Levon (born in 2002). The couple separated in 2003, and the divorce was finalized in August 2005.

Thurman was engaged to American businessman and hotelier André Balazs from 2003 to 2007 but they never married. They briefly rekindled their relationship from 2014 to 2015. Thurman began dating London-based French financier Arpad Busson in 2007, and they announced their engagement in June 2008. In late 2009, they called off their engagement, but reconciled soon after. The couple called off the engagement for the second time in April 2014. Thurman and Busson have a daughter, Luna Thurman-Busson, born in July 2012. In January 2017, Thurman and Busson began child custody negotiations in relation to their daughter, which resulted in Thurman receiving primary physical custody later that month.

Thurman dated architect Peter Sabbeth in 2020. As of 2021, she was dating American media executive Justin B. Smith.

=== Stalking and sexual assaults ===
Thurman was the target of a stalker, Jack Jordan, from about 2004 to 2011. He was arrested in October 2007 and, following a trial in which Thurman testified as a witness, was convicted of stalking and harassment charges the following May. Sentenced to three years' probation, Jordan was arrested again in 2010 on charges of violating a restraining order by attempting to contact her. He pleaded guilty in November 2011 after spending 11 months in jail in lieu of bail, and was released with time served.

In 2017, in the wake of the Harvey Weinstein sexual abuse allegations, Thurman was asked about the scandal; she replied, "No comment," and said she was too angry to discuss it. A few weeks later, through an Instagram post, she joined the "Me Too" hashtag, confirming that she had suffered sexual harassment and expressing disgust for Harvey Weinstein. In a 2018 interview with The New York Times, Thurman said Weinstein had sexually assaulted her in 1994 at the Savoy Hotel in London. She also said she had been sexually assaulted at age 16 by an actor nearly 20 years her senior.

=== Kill Bill car crash ===
In the 2018 New York Times interview, Thurman described how she had been in a serious car accident back in 2003 on the set of Kill Bill, because Tarantino had insisted she perform her own driving stunts. Two weeks after the crash, she tried to see footage of the incident. Thurman stated that Miramax would only agree to show her the footage if she signed a contract "releasing them of any consequences of my future pain and suffering", which she refused. As a result of the crash, she sustained permanent injuries to her neck and knees. Tarantino later called this incident "the biggest regret of [his] life". Thurman later clarified on Instagram that Tarantino had apologized to her for the incident and that she has since forgiven him, being open to working with him again.

=== Activism and politics ===
Thurman has been involved in various philanthropic and activist causes. She is a supporter of the Democratic Party, and has given money to the campaigns of John Kerry, Hillary Clinton, and Joseph R. Driscoll. She supports gun control, and in 2000 participated in Marie Claire's "End Gun Violence Now" campaign. She is a member of the board of Room to Grow, a charitable organization providing aid to families and children suffering poverty. She serves on the board of the Tibet House US. In 2007, she hosted the Nobel Peace Prize Concert in Oslo, Norway, with actor Kevin Spacey.

In February 2008, ahead of that year's Summer Olympics in Beijing, China, Thurman talked about human rights in China alongside Steven Spielberg and others.

In 2011, Thurman was one of several celebrities associated with the USAID and Ad Council's FWD campaign, an awareness initiative tied to that year's East Africa drought. She joined Geena Davis, Chanel Iman and Josh Hartnett in TV and internet ads to "forward the facts" about the crisis. During the same year, she also participated at Human Rights Campaign for LGBT civil rights, saying "We're fighting for a conservative value: the right to make a lifelong commitment to someone you love". In 2015, Thurman joined "Rhino Rescue Project" and traveled to Southern Africa to assist and help relocate the threatened species of black rhinoceros; being in close contact with rhinos, Thurman defined her experience with those animals to be "spiritual, surreal".

Thurman was critical of the Texas Heartbeat Act, an abortion ban that went into effect in September 2021. She called the law a "human rights crisis for American women", and discussed her experience of obtaining an abortion in her teens after she had been "accidentally impregnated by a much older man." She described her abortion as "the hardest decision of my life," but maintained that it "allowed me to grow up and become the mother I wanted and needed to be."

== Acting credits and awards ==
Thurman has starred in over 50 films. According to review aggregator website Rotten Tomatoes and infotainment website Screen Rant, her most critically acclaimed and commercial successful films include Pulp Fiction (1994), Dangerous Liaisons (1988), Kill Bill: Volume 1 (2003), Kill Bill: Volume 2 (2004), Nausicaä of the Valley of the Wind (1984), The Adventures of Baron Munchausen (1988), The Truth About Cats & Dogs (1996), Gattaca (1997), Beautiful Girls (1996), Mad Dog and Glory (1993), Sweet and Lowdown (1999), Tape (2001), Les Miserables (1998), and A Month by the Lake (1995).

Thurman's performance in Pulp Fiction earned nominations for an Academy Award, a BAFTA Award, a Golden Globe Award, and a SAG-AFTRA's Actor Award. For her work in Kill Bill: Volume 1 and Volume 2 she was nominated for the BAFTA Award for Best Actress in a Leading Role, the Critics' Choice Movie Award for Best Actress, and two Golden Globe Awards for Best Actress in a Motion Picture – Drama. For her work on the television, she won the Golden Globe Award for Best Actress in a Television Film for Hysterical Blindness (2002) and was nominated for the Primetime Emmy Award for Outstanding Guest Actress in a Drama Series for Smash (2012).
