= Paola Tiziana Cruciani =

Italian actress, comedian and playwright

- Born: 17 October 1958 (age 67); Rome, Italy
- Occupation: Actress
- Height: 1.70 m (5 ft 7 in)

Paola Tiziana Cruciani (born 29 May 1958) is an Italian actress, comedian and playwright.

== Life and career ==
Born in Rome, Cruciani studied acting at the "Laboratorio Teatrale", a theatre workshop directed by Gigi Proietti, graduating in 1981. Between 1981 and 1984 she was a member of the comedy ensemble "La Zavorra", with whom she took part in several television variety shows.

In 1984, Cruciani began working on stage as a playwright, actress and director, and in the same year made her film debut in Francesco Laudadio's Fatto su misura. She was married for several years to film director Paolo Virzì, with whom she had a daughter, Ottavia.

In 1999, she was nominated for a David di Donatello for Best Supporting Actress thanks to her performance in Virzì's Kisses and Hugs.

== Selected filmography ==
- Fatto su misura, directed by Francesco Laudadio (1984)
- Magic Moments, directed by Luciano Odorisio (1984)
- I pompieri, directed by Neri Parenti (1985)
- Condominio, directed by Felice Farina (1990)
- Living It Up, directed by Paolo Virzì (1994)
- No Skin, directed by Alessandro D'Alatri (1994)
- A Cold, Cold Winter, directed by Roberto Cimpanelli (1996)
- August Vacation, directed by Paolo Virzì (1996)
- Stella's Favor, directed by Giancarlo Scarchilli (1997)
- Kisses and Hugs, directed by Paolo Virzì (1998)
- Caterina in the Big City, directed by Paolo Virzì (2003)
- What Will Happen to Us, directed by Giovanni Veronesi (2004)
- Commediasexi, directed by Alessandro D'Alatri (2006)
- La buona battaglia – Don Pietro Pappagallo, directed by Gianfranco Albano (2006)
- Your Whole Life Ahead of You, directed by Paolo Virzì (2008)
- This Night Is Still Ours, directed by Paolo Genovese and Luca Miniero (2008)
- Christine Cristina, directed by Stefania Sandrelli (2009)
- Easy!, directed by Francesco Bruni (2011)
- Balancing Act, directed by Ivano De Matteo (2012)
- Out of the Blue, directed by Edoardo Leo (2013)
- Sun, Heart, Love, directed by Daniele Vicari (2016)
- Nove lune e mezza di Michela Andreozzi (2017)
- Dreamfools, directed by Francesco Miccichè (2018)
- Permette? Alberto Sordi, directed by Luca Manfredi (2020)
- Dry, directed by Paolo Virzì (2022)
- Chiara, directed by Susanna Nicchiarelli (2022)
- Beata te, directed by Paola Randi (2022)
- There's Still Tomorrow, directed by Paola Cortellesi (2023)
- Another Summer Holiday, directed by Paolo Virzì (2024)
