= List of Italian films of 1991 =

A list of films produced in Italy in 1991 (see 1991 in film):

Title	Director	Cast	Genre	Notes
1991
Abbronzatissimi	Bruno Gaburro	Jerry Calà, Teo Teocoli, Alba Parietti	comedy	
Alambrado	Marco Bechis	Jacqueline Lustig	drama	Entered into the 1991 Locarno Film Festival
L'alba	Francesco Maselli	Nastassja Kinski, Massimo Dapporto	drama	
L'amore necessario	Fabio Carpi	Marie-Christine Barrault, Ben Kingsley	drama	Entered the 48th Venice International Film Festival
Americano rosso	Alessandro D'Alatri	Burt Young, Fabrizio Bentivoglio, Massimo Ghini, Sabrina Ferilli	comedy	Winner of David di Donatello, Globo d'oro, Grolla d'oro and Ciak d'oro
Bix	Pupi Avati	Bryant Weeks	Biographical drama	Entered into the 1991 Cannes Film Festival
Blue Tornado	Antonio Bido	Dirk Benedict, Patsy Kensit	action-thriller	
La casa del sorriso	Marco Ferreri	Ingrid Thulin, Enzo Cannavale, María Mercader	drama	Won the Golden Bear at Berlin
Chiedi la luna	Giuseppe Piccioni	Giulio Scarpati, Margherita Buy, Roberto Citran	comedy drama	
Le comiche 2	Neri Parenti	Paolo Villaggio, Renato Pozzetto	comedy	
Condominio	Felice Farina	Carlo Delle Piane, Ottavia Piccolo, Ciccio Ingrassia, Roberto Citran	comedy drama	Ingrassia won the David di Donatello for Best Supporting Actor
Il conte Max	Christian De Sica	Christian De Sica, Ornella Muti	Comedy	
The Conviction	Marco Bellocchio	Vittorio Mezzogiorno, Andrzej Seweryn, Claire Nebout	Courtroom drama	Won the Jury Grand Prix at Berlin
Dèmoni 3	Umberto Lenzi	Keith Van Hoven	horror	
The Devil's Daughter	Michele Soavi	Kelly Curtis, Herbert Lom	horror	
Donne con le gonne	Francesco Nuti	Francesco Nuti, Carole Bouquet, Gastone Moschin	horror	
Door to Silence	Lucio Fulci	John Savage	horror	
Especially on Sunday	Giuseppe Tornatore, Marco Tullio Giordana, Giuseppe Bertolucci, Francesco Barilli	Philippe Noiret, Ornella Muti, Bruno Ganz, Jean-Hugues Anglade, Chiara Caselli	comedy-drama	four segments, all written by Tonino Guerra
Fantaghirò	Lamberto Bava	Alessandra Martines	Fantasy	television film
A Fine Romance	Gene Saks	Julie Andrews, Marcello Mastroianni	Comedy	
Fratelli e sorelle	Pupi Avati	Anna Bonaiuto, Franco Nero, Paola Quattrini, Stefano Accorsi	Drama	
The Flesh	Marco Ferreri	Sergio Castellitto, Francesca Dellera	drama	Entered into the 1991 Cannes Film Festival
Husband and Lovers	Mauro Bolognini	Julian Sands, Joanna Pacuła, Tchéky Karyo	erotic drama	last film of Bolognini
Indio 2: The Revolt	Antonio Margheriti	Marvelous Marvin Hagler	adventure	
The Inner Circle	Andrei Konchalovsky	Tom Hulce, Lolita Davidovich, Bob Hoskins	drama	American, Italian and Russian co-production
Johnny Stecchino	Roberto Benigni	Roberto Benigni, Nicoletta Braschi	Comedy	Blockbuster
Malizia 2mila	Salvatore Samperi	Laura Antonelli, Turi Ferro	comedy	sequel of Malicious. Last film of Samperi
Mediterraneo	Gabriele Salvatores	Diego Abatantuono, Claudio Bigagli, Claudio Bisio	War, Comedy	Academy Awardwinner. David di Donatello winner
Millions	Carlo Vanzina	Billy Zane, Lauren Hutton, Carol Alt, Alexandra Paul	drama	
Miracle of Marcellino	Luigi Comencini	Fernando Fernán Gómez	family	last film of Comencini
Il muro di gomma	Marco Risi	Corso Salani, Angela Finocchiaro, Ivano Marescotti	Drama	Entered the 48th Venice International Film Festival
Paprika	Tinto Brass	Deborah Caprioglio, Martine Brochard	Erotic	
Pensavo fosse amore, invece era un calesse	Massimo Troisi	Massimo Troisi, Francesca Neri, Marco Messeri	romance-comedy drama	
Per sempre	Walter Hugo Khouri	Ben Gazzara, Eva Grimaldi, Corinne Cléry	drama	
Piedipiatti	Carlo Vanzina	Enrico Montesano, Renato Pozzetto	Comedy	
Reflections in a Dark Sky	Salvatore Maira	Françoise Fabian, Anna Kanakis, Valerie Perrine, Peter Stormare	drama	
La riffa	Francesco Laudadio	Monica Bellucci, Giulio Scarpati, Massimo Ghini	comedy drama	
Rossini! Rossini!	Mario Monicelli	Sergio Castellitto, Philippe Noiret, Giorgio Gaber, Jacqueline Bisset	Biographical drama	David di Donatello for Best Costumes
Speaking of the Devil	Enzo Barboni	Bud Spencer, Carol Alt	Comedy	
Una storia semplice	Emidio Greco	Gian Maria Volonté, Massimo Dapporto, Ennio Fantastichini, Ricky Tognazzi, Massimo Ghini	Drama	Entered the 48th Venice International Film Festival. Winner of a Nastro d'Argento, two Globi d'oro and a Grolla d'oro
To Want to Fly	Maurizio Nichetti	Maurizio Nichetti, Angela Finocchiaro	Comedy	Mix of animation and actors. David di Donatello Best Script
Ultra	Ricky Tognazzi	Claudio Amendola, Ricky Memphis	Sport drama	Tognazzi won the Silver Bear for Best Director at Berlin
Vacanze di Natale '91	Enrico Oldoini	Christian De Sica, Massimo Boldi, Ornella Muti, Alberto Sordi	comedy	
The Yes Man	Daniele Luchetti	Silvio Orlando, Nanni Moretti, Giulio Brogi, Angela Finocchiaro	political drama	Entered into the 1991 Cannes Film Festival
Where the Night Begins	Maurizio Zaccaro	Tom Gallop	Horror	
The Wicked	Carlo Lizzani	Giuliana De Sio, Julian Sands, Erland Josephson	Biographical drama	David di Donatello for Best Actress
Zitti e mosca	Alessandro Benvenuti	Alida Valli, Alessandro Benvenuti, Massimo Ghini	comedy	

== See also ==
- 1991 in Italian television
