= Raffaella Lebboroni =

Italian actress (born 1961)

- Born: Raffaella Lebboroni; 10 June 1961 (age 64); Bologna, Emilia-Romagna, Italy
- Occupation: Actress
- Years active: 1989–present
- Spouse: Francesco Bruni (m. 1992)
- Children: 2

Raffaella Lebboroni (born 10 June 1961) is an Italian actress.

== Biography ==
Born in Bologna, Lebboroni attended the Accademia dell'Antoniano, graduating in 1988. In 1992 she married the screenwriter and director Francesco Bruni, with the couple having two children.

A versatile and charismatic actress even in her supporting roles, Lebboroni is also remembered in Marco Risi's The Rubber Wall (1991) and Roberto Benigni's Life Is Beautiful (1997). She also starred in Paolo Virzì's August Vacation (1996) and in Carlo Virzì's The Summer of My First Kiss (2006).

Lebboroni has also starred in other films, such as The Early Bird Catches the Worm by Francesco Patierno, as well as Easy! (2011), Us 4 (2014), Friends by Chance (2017), and Everything's Gonna Be Alright (2020), all directed by her husband Bruni.

In 2019 she was part of the cast of The Traitor by Marco Bellocchio, and in 2020 she is in the film Everything's Gonna Be Alright by Bruni.

== Filmography ==
- Music for Old Animals (1989), blonde nurse
- The Rubber Wall (1991), editorial journalist
- Let's Not Keep in Touch (1994), library cashier
- The True Life of Antonio H. (1994), teacher
- Living It Up (1994), Marisa Cavedoni
- August Vacation (1995), Betta
- A Paradise of Lies (1997), Stefano's secretary
- Life Is Beautiful (1997), Elena
- The Early Bird Catches the Worm (2008), Marco's mother
- Easy! (2011), teacher Di Biagio
- Us 4 (2014), Nicoletta
- Friends by Chance (2017), Laura
- The Traitor (2019), judge
- Everything's Gonna Be Alright (2020), doctor
- Another Summer Holiday (2024), Betta
