= Virzì =

Virzì is an Italian surname. Notable people with the surname include:

- Carlo Virzì (born 1972), Italian composer, film director, and screenwriter
- Paolo Virzì (born 1964), Italian film director, screenwriter, and producer
