= 1991 in Italian television =

This is a list of Italian television related events from 1991.

== Events ==
=== RAI ===
- 17 January-17 February: Gulf War; for Italy, it's the first televised one. On January 21, the images, taken by Iraqi TV, of the Italian aviator Maurizio Cocciolone, shot down and taken prisoner, aroused emotion in public opinion.
- 28 February: President Francesco Cossiga announces on television the end of the Gulf war; the message gets 16,647 million viewers, record of the year.
- 2 March: Riccardo Cocciante wins the Sanremo Music Festival, presented by Andrea Occhipinti and Edwige Fenech, with Se stiamo insieme.
- 4 May - The 36th Eurovision Song Contest is held at the Studio 15 di Cinecittà in Rome. Sweden wins the contest with the song "Fångad av en stormvind", performed by Carola.
- 9 July: while a controversy over advertising in films is underway, Federico Fellini obtains from RAI, exceptionally, that his Intervista be broadcast without interruption.
- 8 August - The cargo ship Vlora, charged with almost 20,000 Albanian migrants, lands by force to the "coals quay"of the Bari port; the cameras of TGR Apulia shoot the scene. In the next days, the RAI news (both local and national) follow the development of events, showing to Italy the dramatic image of the refugees amassed in the Stadio della Vittoria, until the forced repatriation of most of them.
- December: RAI broadcasts extend to the night hours and cover the whole 24 hours of the day.
- 26 December: First RAI broadcast for the blind. While on the television Stanley Kubrick's Spartacus goes on air, the radio broadcasts the audio description of the film.

=== Fininvest ===
- 9 January: Canale 5 broadcasts the first episode of Twin Peaks. The series repeats in Italy the success gotten in the United States, with 11 million viewers.
- 17 January: on Italia 1, Emilio Fede, director of Studio Aperto (Open Studio), beating on time RAI, announces on air the beginning of Desert Storm and follows the events with a long special edition, until 8 AM; the news program had been launched just the day before.
- 15 April: on Italia 1, the infotainment show L'istruttoria broadcasts a brawl between the critic Vittorio Sgarbi and the journalist Roberto D'Agostino, notoriously rivals. The two, after heavily insulting each other, come to blows in front of the cameras. The episode becomes emblematic of the Italian TV's drit towards trash.
- 29 July: TG4, the second Finivest news program, starts on Rete4, directed by Edvige Bernasconi.
- 1 September: Emilio Fede announces the start of live broadcasts for Fininvest.
- 16 September: on Canale 5, debut of the morning news TG5 Prima Pagina.
- 26 September: First collaboration between RAI and Fininvest. Samarcanda, with Michele Santoro, and the Maurizio Costanzo show broadcast, in relay, a five-hour anti-mafia marathon in memory of Libero Grassi, with the presence of the Minister of Justice Claudio Martelli, Pippo Baudo and Giovanni Falcone. Those who took part in the broadcast come into the Cosa Nostra's crosshair. On November 3, a mafia attack destroys Baudo's villa in Acireale.
- 1 October - Long running US animated comedy series The Simpsons begins broadcasting on television stations all across Italy for the first time. The series was premiered on Canale 5.

=== Other channels ===
- 3 February: the syndication TV7 Pathe, owned by Giancarlo Parretti, begins to broadcast.
- 19 March: Retemia's bankruptcy; its president Giorgio Mendella, who used the channel to promote his unscrupulous financial operations, fled to Romania to escape arrest.
- 1 June: birth of pay-TV in Italy; the thematic channel Tele+1, dedicated to cinema, begins encrypted broadcasts airing Blade Runner by Ridley Scott.
- 26 June: during the Ten Day War, a Serbian bombing destroys the TV-Koper repeaters; Slovenian TV is no longer visible on Italian territory.
- 6 November: debut of the Videomusic's news program.
- 29 November: Umberto Eco, generally reluctant to appear on television, grants a long interview to Alain Elkann on Telemontecarlo.

== Awards ==
8. Telegatto award, for the season 1990–1991.

- Show of the year: Paperissima.
- Man and woman of the year: Corrado Mantoni and Raffaella Carrà; Gabibbo (as year's revelations).
- Best TV movie: Felipe ha gli occhi azzurri.
- Best serial: Casa Vianello (for Italy), Twin Peaks (for abroad).
- Best telenovela: La extraña dama.
- Best soap-opera: The bold and the beautiful.
- Best quiz: Telemike.
- Best game show: Bellezze sulla neve.
- Best variety: Creme-Caramel.
- Best satirical show: Striscia la notizia.
- Best talk show: Piacere, Raiuno.
- Best music show: Sanremo Music festival.
- Best informative program: I dieci comandamenti all'Italiana.
- Best sport show: 90° minuto.
- Best cultural program : La macchina meravigliosa
- Best show for children: Sabato al circo.
- Best spot: Volkswagen Golf
- Special awards: Chi l'ha visto? (for the service TV), Mrs. Roberta Benedetti (reader of Sorrisi e Canzoni), Robert De Niro (for the cinema in TV) and Robert Mitchum.

== Debuts ==
=== RAI ===
==== Miniseries ====
- Felipe ha gli occhi azzurri (Felipe has blue eyes) – by Gianfranco Albano and Felice Farina, with Claudio Amendola, Silvio Orlando and the eight-years old Filipino child Victor Vicente as protagonist; 2 seasons. The miniseries, also if treats challenging topics like the clandestine immigration and the exploitation of the minors, gets a huge public success, with 10 million viewiers.

==== Serials ====
- I ragazzi del muretto (The little wall boys) – coming-of-age serial, set in a Rome high-school, with Francesca Antonelli and Lorenzo Diglio; 3 seasons. Unlike many similar products, it treats also serious matters as racism and drug.
- Extralarge by Enzo G. Castellari and Alessandro Capone, with Bud Spencer, Philip Michael Thomas, and Michael Winslow; 2 seasons (the second on Canale 5).
- L’ispettore Sarti, un uomo una città (Superintendent Sarti, a man, a city) – procedural set in Bononia, with Gianni Cavina in the title role, from the Loriano Macchiavelli’s novels; 2 seasons.

==== Variety ====
- Avanzi (Leftovers) – with Serena Dandini (also author), Corrado Guzzanti and a debuting Luciana Litizzetto; 3 seasons. It begins as a parody of the Italian television while in the two later seasons the satire is extended to the whole society. The leftovers of the title are "shows never aired, found in the RAI archives", obviously staged by the actors.
- Scommettiamo che... (Let's make a bet) – Italian version of the German show Wetten, dass..?, hosted by Fabrizio Frizzi and Milly Carlucci, care of Michele Guardì; 10 seasons.
- Creme caramel – variety set in a pastry shop by Pier Francesco Pingitore, with the Bagaglino troupe; 2 seasons.
- Non è mai troppo tardi - revival and parody of Alberto Manzi's historic educational program in the form of a quiz on the Italian language, with Gianni Ippoliti; 2 seasons.
- Aspettando Miss Italia (Waiting for Miss Italia) – with various hosts, lasted till 2012; now on San Marino RTV and Rai Play.

==== News and educational ====
- Detto tra noi – infotainment afternoon show, aimed to the female public and focused on gossip and crime news, with Pietro Vigorelli and Patrizia Caselli; after many changes of titles and hosts, it's again on air as Vita in diretta, hosted by Alberto Matano. Often criticized for its sensationalism, it however got a noticeable public success and generated several spin-off.
- Diritto di replica (Right to reply) – semiserious talk show, hosted by Sandro Paternostro and Fabio Fazio, with controversial personalities defending themselves as guests; 2 seasons.
- Turisti per caso (Accidental tourists) – humorous travel show, with Patrizio Roversi and Syusy Blady; 18 seasons.
- Il circolo delle 12 - daily cultural magazine, hosted by Roberto Battaglia and others; lasted till 1994.
- Il coraggio di vivere (The courage of living) – magazine about healthcare and social questions, care of Riccardo Bonacina; 4 seasons (the first two follow the formula of the film with debate).
- Da Storia nasce Storia – with Ottavio Rosati, an attempt to bring the psychodrama method to television; 2 seasons. It is considered a more intellectual forerunner of the reality-show genre.
- Sottotraccia – reportages about Italian life by Ugo Gregoretti; lasted till 1994.

==== For children ====
- Disney Club – Italian version of The Mickey Mouse club, lasted, with various hosts, till 2006.

=== Fininvest ===
==== Serials ====
- Vicini di casa (Neighbours) – sit-com written by Gino & Michele, with Silvio Orlando, Teo Teocoli and Gene Gnocchi; 2 seasons.
- Casa dolce casa (Home sweet home) family sitcom with Gianfranco D’Angelo and Alida Chelli; 3 seasons.

==== Variety ====
- Non è la RAI (It's not RAI) – musical and game show ideated by Gianni Boncompagni and hosted by Erica Bonaccorti, Paolo Bonolis and Ambra Angiolini (debuting 15 years old), with a cast composed almost entirely by female teen-agers, some of which, as Angiolini herself and Claudia Gerini, destined to a career in the show business; 4 seasons. The program becomes a cultural phenomenon, with episodes of stardom for the adolescent showgirls but is also heavily criticized for the given image of the young woman, shallow and sexually precocious.
- Mai dire TV – anthology of involuntarily comic clips broadcast on local Italian TV and on foreign satellite channels, commented by Gialappa's Band; 2 seasons.
- Bellezze sulla neve (Beauties on the snow) – winter version of Bellezze al bagno, aired from ski resorts, hosted by Marco Columbro and Lorella Cuccarini, later by Claudio Lippi and Sabrina Salerno; 2 seasons.
- Bravo Bravissimo – contest among talented children (musicians, actors, dancers, illusionists) hosted by Mike Bongiorno and sponsored by UNICEF; lasted till 2001.
- Simpaticissima – talent show with VIP women as contenders, hosted by Gerry Scotti and others; 7 seasons.
- Urka! – game show with Paolo Bonolis and Luca Laurenti (debuting as a couple); Italian version of Remote Control.
- Il TG delle vacanze, parodic news program, hosted by Trettrè, then by Zuzzurro and Gaspare; 2 seasons.

==== News and educationals ====
- L'istruttoria – in-depth program care of Giuliano Ferrara and Lino Jannuzzi, much discussed for its partisanship and for the debates that often degenerate into verbal brawls (see over); 2 seasons.
- Domenica Stadio – sport magazine, following the Serie A, hosted by Sandro Piccinini, Marino Bartoletti and others; 5 seasons.

=== Other channelas ===
- Festa di compleanno (Birthday party) – variety with Loretta Goggi, then with Gigliola Cinquetti; 2 seasons (TMC).
- La più bella sei tu (You are the nicest) – with Luciano Rispoli and Laura Lattuada, contest to choose the best song since 1962, 3 seasons (TMC).

=== International ===
- 9 January - (United States) Twin Peaks (Canale 5) (see over)
- 9 September - (United States) Tiny Toon Adventures (Canale 5) (1990-1995)
- 1 October - (United States) The Simpsons (Canale 5) (1989–present)
- 31 December - (France) Marianne 1ère (Canale 5) (1990)
- (Japan) Samurai Pizza Cats (Odeon TV) (1991)
- (United States) Chip 'n Dale: Rescue Rangers (Rai 1) (1989-1990)
- (United States) The Tom & Jerry Kids Show (Rai 1) (1990-1993)
- (United Kingdom) The Benny Hill show (Italia 1) - in the program, sketches realized in Italy, with the Drive in girls, are inserted.

== Television shows ==
=== RAI ===
==== Drama ====
- Voyage of Terror: The Achille Lauro Affair by Alberto Negrin, with Burt Lancaster, Eva Marie Saint and Renzo Montagnani.
- Liberate mio figlio (Free my son) by Roberto Malenotti, with Marthe Keller; inspired by the true story of Cesare Casella, kidnapped and hold prisoner for two years by the Calabrian ‘Ndrangheta.
- Women in arms – by Sergio Corbucci (last direction), with Lina Sastri and Angela Marsillach.
- La ragnatela – thriller by Alessandro Cane with Andrea Occhipinti; a sequel.
- Il ritorno di Ribot (Ribot comes back) by Pino Passalacqua, with Charles Aznavour and Lorenzo de Pasqua, coproduced with France; a groom and a horse redeem a teddy boy, who becomes a jockey.
- Vento di mare (Sea wind) – by Gianfranco Mingozzi, with Edoardo Velo.
- Una vita in gioco by Franco Giraldi, with Mariangela Melato; a bourgeois woman, faced with the crisis of her marriage, becomes a professor, and then a writer; with a sequel by Giuseppe Bertolucci.

===== Historical dramas =====
- ... se non avessi l'amore (If love lacked me) – biopic about Pier Giorgio Frassati, by Leandro Castellani, with Antonio Sabato jr. and Ottavia Piccolo.
- Doris, una diva del regime by Alfredo Giannetti, with Elide Melli (Doris Duranti) and Carlo Cartier (Alessandro Pavolini).
- A private affair, by Alberto Negrin, from Beppe Fenoglio ‘s A private matter, with Rupert Graves.

==== Miniseries ====
- The mystery of the black jungle, by Kevin Connor, from the Emilio Salgari's novel, with Stacy Keach, Virna Lisi and Kabir Bedi; 3 episodes.

==== Serials ====
- Il commissario Corso (Chief Corso) – by Alberto Sironi and Gianni Lepre, with Diego Abatantuono as a Southern police superintendent in Milan; realized for the coproduction series Eurocops.

==== Variety ====
- ...e compagnia bella - talk show with Enrico Vaime and Mara Venier.
- Varietà - with Pippo Baudo.
- La piscina – summer show with Alba Parietti.
- Ciao week-end - with Giancarlo Magalli and Heather Parisi.

==== News and educational ====
- Il portalettere (The postman) – Piero Chiambretti, as an irreverent postman, delivers the Andrea Barbato's open letters to public personalities, moreover politicians; the last one is to the Republic President Francesco Cossiga.
- Goodbye Cortina – ironical reportage by Piero Chiambretti about Eastern Europe after the fall of the iron curtain; 8 episodes.
- Profondo Nord (Deep North) – political talk show hosted by Gad Lerner; the journalist travels among the Northern Italy towns, trying to understand the reasons of the Lega Nord's success.
- Passo falso – Gad Lerner interviews public personality who, in their life, committed a "misstep".
- I dieci comandamenti all'italiana (The Ten Commandments Italian Style) – Enzo Biagi's enquiry about the relationship of Italians with religion and ethics; 10 episodes.
- Viaggio in Italia, schegge dagli anni '60 (Journey in Italy, splinters from the Sixties) – montage film by Filippo Porcelli, realized exclusively with material from the RAI archives.
- La lunga notte del comunismo (The Communism’s long night) – documentary by Gustavo Selva, 6 episodes.
- Zeus, le gesta degli dei e degli eroi (The deeds of gods and heroes) – divulgatuive program about Greek mythology, with Luciano De Crescenzo.

=== Fininvest ===
==== Drama ====
- Fantaghirò – fantasy by Lamberto Bava, with Alessandra Martines, Mario Adorf and Kim Rossi Stuart, from an Italo Calvino's fairy tale; in 2 episodes. The story of the warrior princess is the first Fininvest fiction to get international success and originates a long franchise.
- Come una mamma by Vittorio Sindoni, with Stefania Sandrelli as an heartful governess and Massimo Dapporto.
- Per odio, per amore by Nelo Risi, with Laura del Sol; a woman enquiries about the double life of her lover.
- Ricatto 2, bambini nell’ombra (Children in the shadows) by Vittorio De Sisti, with Massimo Ranieri; sequel of Il ricatto, 4 episodes.
- Never hurt children! by Giovanni Simonelli, horror version of Hansel and Gretel; judeged too violent by Mediaset, it is aired only by some local televisions.

==== Comedy ====
- Odissey with Andrea Roncato (Odysseus) and Moana Pozzi (Penelope), and The three musketeers, with Marco Columbro, Francesco Salvi, Teo Teocoli and Gerry Scotti; musical parodies by Beppe Recchia.

==== Miniseries ====
- Beyond law by Duccio Tessari, with Carol Alt, Rutger Hauer and Kabir Bedi; 3 episodes. An American businesswoman, helped by an adventurer, rescues her son, kidnapped by his father, an Arab prince.
- Manuela – telenovela with Grecia Colmenares, coproduced with Argentina.

==== Serial ====
- Cristina, l'Europa siamo noi (Cristina, we are the Europe) – with Cristina D'Avena, sequel of Arriva Cristina.
- Andy & Norman – sicom with Zuzzurro and Gaspare, as two improbable advertising creatives.

==== Variety ====
- Mezzogiorno italiano (Italian noon) - with Gianfranco Funari.
- Buonasera - with Amanda Lear.
- Cos'è cos'è – game show with Jocelyn Hattab; first Fininvest live show.
- Il gioco dei giochi - game show with Lino Banfi.
- Mondo Gabibbo with the Gabibbo, suspended for low ratings.
- Primadonna – spin-off of Non è la RAI, with Eva Robin’s and Antonello Prioso; suspended for low ratings.
- Sapore di mare with Luca Barbareschi and Debora Caprioglio, contest of cover from the most famous Italian songs.
- Sei un fenomeno - clips with tests of daring and magic shows, commented by Paolo Bonolis.
- Sorrisi 40 anni vissuti insieme (Forty years lived together) – celebrative show for the TV Sorrisi e canzoni’s forty years.

==== News and educational ====
- Soccer Shoot-Out, by Mario Morra, official film of 1990 FIFA world cup

== Ending this year ==
- Gli antennati
- Be Bop a Lula
- Campo base
- I cartonissimi
- Cerco e offro
- Chiara e gli altri
- Classe di ferro
- Colosseum
- Italia ore 6
- Jonathan
- Patatrac
- La straordinaria storia dell’Italia
- Tra moglie e marito
- Trent’anni della nostra storia

== Deaths ==
| Date | Name | Age | Cinematic Credibility |
|---|---|---|---|
| 2 January | Renato Rascel | 78 | Comic actor |
| 27 February | Nuccio Costa | 65 | Italian television presenter |
| 23 June | Lea Padovani | 70 | Actress |
| 26 August | Itaco Nardulli | 16 | Child actor |
| 20 December | Walter Chiari | 67 | Comic actor |

== See also ==
- List of Italian films of 1991
