= Alessandro Roja =

Italian actor (born 1978)

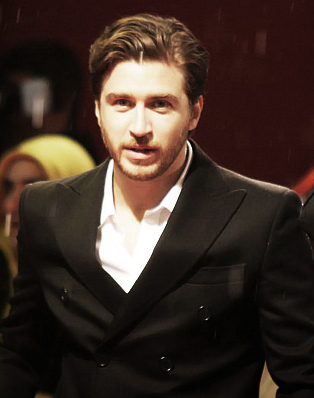
- Roja in 2010
- Born: 4 September 1978 (age 48); Rome, Italy
- Occupation: Actor

Alessandro Roja (born 4 September 1978) is an Italian film, television, and stage actor.

== Life and career ==
Born in Rome, Roja studied at the Centro Sperimentale di Cinematografia, graduating in 2003, and made his professional debut in 2004, in the RAI TV-series Incantesimo. He had his breakout in 2008, playing the Roman gangster Dandi in the crime series Romanzo criminale – La serie.

In 2014 Roya was nominated for the Globo d'oro for best actor and for the Nastro d'Argento in the same category thanks his performance in the Manetti Bros. film Song'e Napule.

=== Personal life ===
Roya is married to Claudia Ranieri, the daughter of football manager Claudio Ranieri.

== Filmography ==
=== Film ===
Year	Title	Role(s)	Notes
2008	Your Whole Life Ahead of You	Assistance Technician	Cameo appearance
2009	Repeat I Stepped in Shit with My Flip Flop	Giorgio	Short film
2010	Tutto l'amore del mondo	Ruben Sebastiani	
2011	The Heir	Bruno	
2011	The Greatest of All	Loris Vanni	
2012	Magnificent Presence	Paolo	
2012	Diaz – Don't Clean Up This Blood	Marco Cerone	
2013	18 m²	Valerio	Short film
2014	Song'e Napule	Paco Stillo	
2014	Bloodhound	Samuele	Short film
2017	It's the Law	Roman Politician	
2017	The End?	Claudio Verona	
2017	Cinecittà Babilonia	Vittorio Mussolini (voice)	Documentary
2018	Restiamo amici	Gigi Natali	
2019	Don't Stop Me Now	Manager	Cameo appearance
2020	Si muore solo da vivi	Orlando	
2021	Other Cannibals	None	Co-producer
2021	Diabolik	Giorgio Caron	
2022	...altrimenti ci arrabbiamo!	Sorriso	
2023	Con la grazia di un Dio	None	Director and screenwriter
2024	The Wild Robot	Fink (voice)	Italian voice-over
2025	The Last One for the Road	None	Co-producer

=== Television ===
Year	Title	Role(s)	Notes
2004–2005	Incantesimo	Armando Olivares	Recurring role (seasons 7-8)
2005	Distretto di Polizia	Stefano Grechi	Episode: "Il quarto uomo"
2008	Don Matteo	Nicola	Episode: "Morte di un cantastorie"
2008–2010	Romanzo criminale – La serie	Mario "Dandi" De Angelis	Main role
2010	Crimini	Fabrizio	Episode: "Neve sporca"
2012	L'olimpiade nascosta	Mario	Television film
2013	La farfalla granata	Gigi Meroni	Television film
2015	1992	Rocco Venturi	Main role
2015–2018	È arrivata la felicità	Pietro Mieli	Main role
2017	Di padre in figlia	Riccardo Sartori	3 episodes
2017	Tutto può succedere	Alberto De Santis	Recurring role (season 2)
2019–2021	La Compagnia del Cigno	Daniele Trani	Main role
2021	Purché finisca bene	Alfredo	Episode: "Mai scherzare con le stelle"
2022	Non mi lasciare	Daniele Vianello	Main role
2025	Call My Agent – Italia	Himself	Season 3, episode 4

=== Music videos ===
Year	Title	Artist(s)	Notes
2014	"Il rimedio la vita e la cura"	Chiara Galiazzo	
2020	"Luci blu"	Emma	
