= I Prefer the Sound of the Sea =

2000 film

- Film poster
- Directed by: Mimmo Calopresti
- Written by: Francesco Bruni; Mimmo Calopresti; Heidrun Schleef
- Produced by: Donatella Botti; Roberto Cicutto; Luigi Musini
- Starring: Silvio Orlando; Michele Raso
- Cinematography: Luca Bigazzi
- Edited by: Massimo Fiocchi
- Release date: 24 March 2000
- Running time: 84 minutes
- Countries: Italy; France
- Language: Italian

I Prefer the Sound of the Sea (Italian: Preferisco il rumore del mare, French: Je préfère le bruit de la mer) is a 2000 Italian-French drama film directed by Mimmo Calopresti. It was screened in the Un Certain Regard section at the 2000 Cannes Film Festival.

The title Preferisco il rumore del mare is a verse of Dino Campana. Rosario reads excerpts of Heart and works in a bookshop named Franti.

== Cast ==
- Silvio Orlando - Luigi
- Michele Raso - Rosario
- Fabrizia Sacchi - Serena
- Paolo Cirio - Matteo
- Mimmo Calopresti - Don Lorenzo
- Andrea Occhipinti - Massimo
- Enrica Rosso - Elisabetta
- Marcello Mazzarella - Vincenzo
- Eugenio Masciari - Cappabianca
- Raffaella Lebboroni - Miriam
- Palma Valentina Di Nunno - Adele
- Lorenzo Ventavoli - Umberto
- Concettina Luddeni - Madre di Luigi
- Laura Curino - Maria (governante)
- Antonio Ferrante - Pasquale (padre di Rosario)
- Stefano Venturi - Giovanni (Mr. Pleigin)
- Giovanni Bissaca - Magistrato
- Elena Turra - Segretaria di Luigi
