= Human Capital (2013 film) =

- Film poster
- Il capitale umano
- Directed by: Paolo Virzì
- Written by: Paolo Virzì; Francesco Piccolo; Francesco Bruni; Stephen Amidon (novel)
- Produced by: Fabrizio Donvito, Marco Cohen, Benedetto Habib
- Starring: Valeria Bruni Tedeschi; Fabrizio Bentivoglio; Valeria Golino; Fabrizio Gifuni; Luigi Lo Cascio; Giovanni Anzaldo; Matilde Gioli; Guglielmo Pinelli; Gigio Alberti; Bebo Storti
- Cinematography: Jérôme Alméras
- Edited by: Cecilia Zanuso
- Music by: Carlo Virzì
- Production companies: Indiana Production Company, coproduced by Rai Cinema and Manny Films
- Release date: 3 December 2013 (Giornate professionali di cinema Sorrento)
- Running time: 109 minutes
- Country: Italy
- Language: Italian

Human Capital (Italian: Il capitale umano) is a 2013 Italian thriller film directed by Paolo Virzì. The film is based on the American novel Human Capital by Stephen Amidon. For her performance in the film, Valeria Bruni Tedeschi was awarded Best Actress at the 2014 Tribeca Film Festival. It was selected as the Italian entry for the Best Foreign Language Film at the 87th Academy Awards, but was not nominated.

An American adaptation of the novel was released in 2019.

== Plot summary ==
The film is set in a town in Brianza and in Milan. On Christmas Eve, a waiter cycling home from working at a prestigious private school gala is hit by a car. The driver flees, leaving the waiter lying in the street badly injured. The waiter is hospitalized and close to death. The next day, two well-known families' lives are connected by the incident.

== Filming locations ==
Even though the story is set in a town in Brianza, most of the urban scenes were filmed in February 2013 in the cities of Varese. Principal photography began on 18 February 2013 and lasted eight weeks. and Como, in the countryside of Osnago in the Province of Lecco and in Arese for the villa with the swimming pool. The beautiful villa of the Bernaschi Family is located in Fortunago, a medieval village in the Province of Pavia.

== Cast ==
- Fabrizio Bentivoglio: Dino Ossola
- Valeria Bruni Tedeschi: Carla Bernaschi
- Fabrizio Gifuni: Giovanni Bernaschi
- Valeria Golino: Roberta Morelli
- Matilde Gioli: Serena Ossola
- Guglielmo Pinelli: Massimiliano Bernaschi
- Luigi Lo Cascio: Donato Russomanno
- Giovanni Anzaldo (it): Luca
- Gigio Alberti: Giampi
- Bebo Storti: Inspector
- Michael Sart: Jean Louis, Bernaschi's assistant
- Silvia Cohen: Adriana Crosetti
- Gianluca Di Lauro: Fabrizio, the cyclist
- Paolo Pierobon, Luca's uncle

== Reception ==
=== Critical response ===
Human Capital holds an 81% rating and a weighted average of 6.8/10 on Rotten Tomatoes based on 68 reviews, with the consensus being, "Part character study, part socioeconomic fable, Human Capital offers trenchant commentary as well as absorbing drama." Metacritic assigned the film a weighted average score of 63 out of 100, based on 19 critics.

=== Awards and nominations ===
Awards
Award	Category	Recipients and nominees	Result
69th Silver Ribbon Awards	Best Director	Paolo Virzì	Won
69th Silver Ribbon Awards	Best Producer	Indiana Production, Rai Cinema and Motorino Amaranto	Nominated
69th Silver Ribbon Awards	Best Screenplay	Francesco Bruni, Francesco Piccolo & Paolo Virzì	Won
69th Silver Ribbon Awards	Best Actor	Fabrizio Bentivoglio e Fabrizio Gifuni	Won
69th Silver Ribbon Awards	Best Actress	Valeria Bruni Tedeschi	Nominated
69th Silver Ribbon Awards	Best Scenography	Mauro Radaelli	Won
69th Silver Ribbon Awards	Best Editing	Cecilia Zanuso	Won
69th Silver Ribbon Awards	Best Sound	Roberto Mozzarelli	Won
69th Silver Ribbon Awards	Guglielmo Biraghi Award	Matilde Gioli	Won
59th David di Donatello Awards	Best Film	Paolo Virzì	Won
59th David di Donatello Awards	Best Director	Paolo Virzì	Nominated
59th David di Donatello Awards	Best Script	Francesco Bruni, Francesco Piccolo & Paolo Virzì	Won
59th David di Donatello Awards	Best Producer	Indiana Production Rai Cinema and Motorino Amaranto	Nominated
59th David di Donatello Awards	Best Actor	Fabrizio Bentivoglio	Nominated
59th David di Donatello Awards	Best Actress	Valeria Bruni Tedeschi	Won
59th David di Donatello Awards	Best Supporting Actor	Fabrizio Gifuni	Won
59th David di Donatello Awards	Best Supporting Actress	Valeria Golino	Won
59th David di Donatello Awards	Best Cinematography	Jérôme Almèras	Nominated
59th David di Donatello Awards	Best Production Design	Mauro Radaelli	Nominated
59th David di Donatello Awards	Best Costumes	Bettina Pontiggia	Nominated
59th David di Donatello Awards	Best Make-up	Caroline Philipponnat	Nominated
59th David di Donatello Awards	Best Hairstyling	Stéphane Desmarez	Nominated
59th David di Donatello Awards	Best Editing	Cecilia Zanuso	Won
59th David di Donatello Awards	Best Sound	Roberto Mozzarelli	Won
59th David di Donatello Awards	Best Score	Carlo Virzì	Nominated
59th David di Donatello Awards	Best Song	Giacomo Vaccai e Jackie O'S Farm	Nominated
59th David di Donatello Awards	Best Special Effects	Effetti Digitali Italiani (eng: Italian Digital Effects)	Nominated
59th David di Donatello Awards	Youngs' David	Paolo Virzì	Nominated
54th Globi d'oro	Best Film	Paolo Virzì	Won
54th Globi d'oro	Best Script	Paolo Virzì, Francesco Bruni, Francesco Piccolo	Nominated
54th Globi d'oro	Best Actor	Fabrizio Bentivoglio	Nominated
50th Karlovy Vary International Film Festival	Crystal Globe	Paolo Virzì	Nominated
50th Chicago International Film Festival	Gold Hugo for Best International Feature	Paolo Virzì	Nominated
50th Chicago International Film Festival	Gold Plaque for Best Art Direction	Mauro Radaelli	Won
41st Flaiano International Prizes	Golden Pegasus Award for Best Director	Paolo Virzì	Won
37th Denver Film Festival	Krzysztof Kieslowski Award for Best Feature	Paolo Virzì	Nominated
34th Hawaii International Film Festival	EuroCinema Hawai'i Award	Paolo Virzì	Nominated
34th Hawaii International Film Festival	EuroCinema Hawai'i Best Actress Award	Valeria Bruni Tedeschi	Won
29th Ciak d'oro	Best Director	Paolo Virzì	Won
29th Ciak d'oro	Best Actress	Valeria Bruni Tedeschi	Won
29th Ciak d'oro	Best Supporting Actor	Fabrizio Gifuni	Nominated
29th Ciak d'oro	Best Supporting Actress	Matilde Gioli	Nominated
29th Ciak d'oro	Best Costumes	Bettina Pontiggia	Nominated
29th Ciak d'oro	Best Screenwriter	Francesco Bruni, Francesco Piccolo and Paolo Virzì	Won
29th Ciak d'oro	Best Sound	Roberto Mozzarelli, Emanuele Chiappa and Alessandro Orlando	Nominated
29th Ciak d'oro	Best Editing	Cecilia Zanuso	Won
29th Ciak d'oro	Best Music	Carlo Virzì	Nominated
29th Ciak d'oro	Best Movie Poster	Riccardo Fidenzi and Maurizio Rubens	Nominated
27th European Film Awards	Best Director	Paolo Virzì	Nominated
27th European Film Awards	Best Actress	Valeria Bruni Tedeschi	Nominated
25th Stockholm International Film Festival	Open Zone Award	Paolo Virzì	Nominated
23rd St. Louis International Film Festival	Best International Film	Paolo Virzì	Nominated
23rd St. Louis International Film Festival	St. Louis Film Critics' Joe Pollack Best Feature Award	Paolo Virzì	Won
22nd Raindance Film Festival	Best International Feature	Paolo Virzì	Nominated
15th Ghent International Film Festival	Canvas Audience Award	Paolo Virzì	Won
12th Tribeca Film Festival	Best Actress	Valeria Bruni Tedeschi	Won
12th Tribeca Film Festival	Best Narrative Feature	Paolo Virzì	Nominated
4th Ischia Global Film & Music Festival	Ischia Italian Movie Award	Paolo Virzì, Fabrizio Donvito, Benedetto Habib and Marco Cohen	Won
4th Ischia Global Film & Music Festival	Ischia Italian Director Award	Paolo Virzì	Won

== See also ==
- List of submissions to the 87th Academy Awards for Best Foreign Language Film
- List of Italian submissions for the Academy Award for Best Foreign Language Film
