= Stephen Amidon =

American author and critic (born 1959)

- Born: 1959 (age 66–67); Chicago, Illinois, U.S.
- Education: Wake Forest University
- Occupations: Author, critic
- Website: www.stephenamidon.com

Stephen Amidon (born 1959) is an American author and critic.

== Life and career ==
Amidon was born in Chicago. He grew up on the East Coast of the United States of America, including a spell in Columbia, Maryland, which served as the inspiration for his fourth novel The New City. Amidon attended Wake Forest University as a Guy T. Carswell Scholar, majoring in philosophy. He moved to London, UK, in 1987, where he was given his first job as a critic by Auberon Waugh, who invited him to review a novel for The Literary Review. In 1999 he returned to the US.

His literary criticism and essays have appeared in many publications in North America and the UK and he has also worked as a film critic for the Financial Times and the Sunday Times. In November 2013, Amidon was on the jury of the 31st Torino Film Festival. Amidon has written two non-fiction books: The Sublime Engine with his brother Tom, a cardiologist, and Something Like the Gods, which is dedicated to his son, Alexander, a first-team, all-ACC wide receiver for the Boston College football team.

In 2023, Wendy Smith of The Washington Post wrote, "Over the past three decades, Stephen Amidon has produced a series of novels as compulsively readable as they are hard-edged about such uncomfortable facts of American life as race, class and money."

Stephen Amidon sold his first work of fiction in 1989, when the short story "Echolocation" was chosen by Ian Hamilton for inclusion in the Bloomsbury anthology Soho Square II. He was awarded an Arts Council of Great Britain bursary for the short story in 1990. He is the author of a collection of short stories and seven novels, the most recent of which, Locust Lane, was released in 2023. His fiction has been published in seventeen countries and has appeared on many best-of-the-year lists. Amidon's novel Human Capital was chosen by Jonathan Yardley of The Washington Post as one of the five best works of fiction of 2004.

An Italian film adaptation of the novel Human Capital (Il capitale umano), directed by Paolo Virzì won best film at the 2014 David di Donatello, Nastro d'Argento, and Globi D'Oro Awards. The film premiered in the U.S. at the 2014 Tribeca Film Festival, and was Italy's entry for best foreign language film at the 2015 Academy Awards.

In February 2015, Teatro Stabile di Torino premiered 6BIANCA, a serial drama, written by Stephen Amidon and directed by Serena Sinigaglia.

The Leisure Seeker, which Amidon adapted as a screenplay with Virzì, Francesca Archibugi, and Francesco Piccolo, premiered in completion at the 2017 Venice Film Festival. The film stars Helen Mirren and Donald Sutherland, and the screenplay was nominated for Italian Golden Globe, and David di Donatello awards.

An American version of Human Capital, directed by Marc Meyers, adapted by Oren Moverman, and starring Liev Schreiber, Alex Wolff, Marisa Tomei, and Maya Hawke, premiered at the 2019 Toronto International Film Festival.

January 2020, filming began in Italy on an adaptation of Amidon's novel Security, directed by Peter Chelsom, and starring Marco D'Amore, Valeria Bilello, and Fabrizio Bentivoglio. Security was released in Italy in May 2021, and elsewhere in June by Netflix, on which it became a worldwide hit.

== Works ==
=== Novels ===
- Splitting the Atom, 1990
- Thirst, 1993
- The Primitive, 1995
- The New City, 2000
- Human Capital, 2004; adapted into namesake Italian and American films (See below)
- Security, 2009
- The Real Justine, 2015
- Locust Lane, 2023

=== Short story collection ===
- Subdivision: Stories, 1991

=== Non-fiction ===
- The Sublime Engine: A Biography of the Human Heart, 2011
- Something Like the Gods: A Cultural History of the Athlete from Achilles to LeBron, 2012

=== Screenplay ===
- The Leisure Seeker, 2017

=== Plays ===
- 6Bianca - episodes 1-6, 2015 Teatro Stabilie di Torino - directed by Serena Sinigaglia

=== Film adaptations ===
- Human Capital (2013) - directed by Paolo Virzì
- Human Capital (2019) - directed by Marc Meyers
- Security (2020) - directed by Peter Chelsom
