= Paolo Virzì =

Italian film director, writer and producer

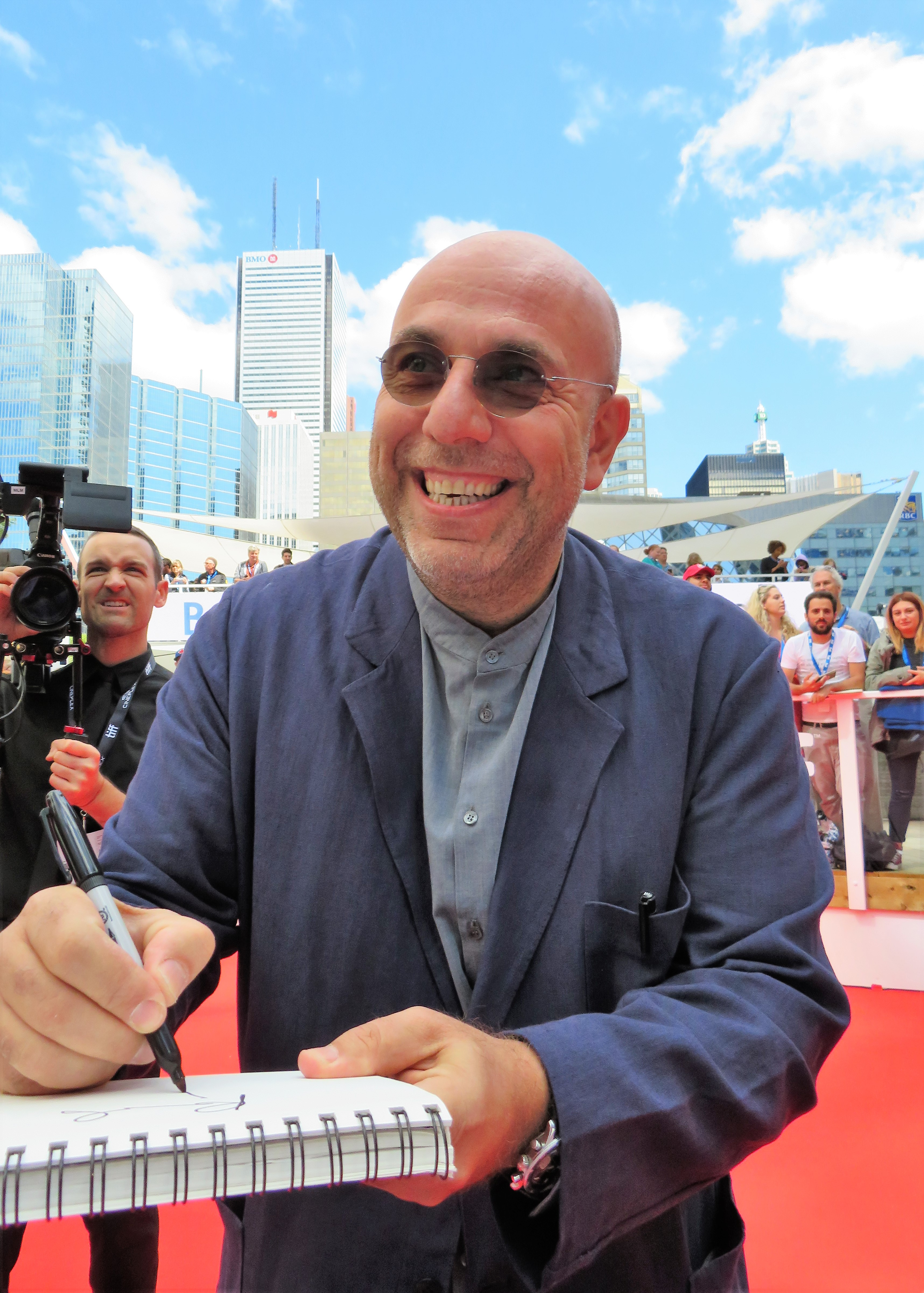
- Paolo Virzì at the 2017 Toronto International Film Festival
- Born: 4 March 1964 (age 62); Livorno, Tuscany, Italy
- Occupations: Director; cinematographer; writer; producer; editor
- Years active: 1986–present
- Height: 1.80 m (5 ft 11 in)
- Spouse(s): Paola Tiziana Cruciani Micaela Ramazzotti (m. 2009)
- Children: 2

Paolo Virzì (Italian pronunciation: [ˈpaːolo virˈdzi]; born 4 March 1964) is an Italian film director, writer and producer.

== Early life and work ==
Virzì was born in Livorno, Italy, in 1964, as the son of a Sicilian police officer in the Carabinieri and a former singer. After spending his early childhood in Turin in the north of Italy, Virzì's family moved back to Livorno where he grew up in the working class area of "Le Sorgenti". As a small boy, he started to cultivate his lifelong passion for literature: Mark Twain and Charles Dickens were among his favourite authors and their classic "coming of age" novels would later serve as a model for his screenplays.

As a teenager, Virzì's versatility was already in evidence as he threw himself into writing, directing and acting in plays for drama companies in Livorno. He formed an artistic partnership with his schoolmate Francesco Bruni, who would later become his trusted co-screenwriter. For a time, Paolo attended Literature and Philosophy classes at Pisa University and shot some short films and a few longer features that have since vanished in the annals of time. He then left Livorno for Rome, where he studied screenwriting at the historic Centro Sperimentale di Cinematografia film school, graduating in 1987. His teachers included prestigious film director, Gianni Amelio and the screenwriter of some of the greatest Italian movies of all time, Furio Scarpelli: Scarpelli was to play a crucial role in Virzì's life, becoming his mentor and his guide, his "maestro" in other words. Paolo co-wrote with Scarpelli the screenplay for Giuliano Montaldo's Time to Kill, based on the novel by Ennio Flaiano and starring Nicolas Cage. Between the late 1980s and early 1990s, he also co-wrote the screenplays of Turnè (On Tour) (1990) directed by Gabriele Salvatores, Condominio (1991) directed by Felice Farina and Centro Storico (1982) directed by Roberto Giannarelli. He also worked with the famous Neapolitan writer Raffaele La Capria on a TV movie A Private Affair directed by Alberto Negrin and adapted from the novel Una questione privata (A Private Affair) by Beppe Fenoglio, starring young British actor and star of Room with a View, Rupert Graves.

== Career ==
Virzì made his directorial début in 1994, with La bella vita, originally titled Dimenticare Piombino (Forgetting Piombino) after the Tuscan city the film is set in. Virzì's first feature film stars Sabrina Ferilli and Massimo Ghini, and tells the story of a love triangle set against the backdrop of the irreversible identity crisis of the Italian working class. The movie was presented at the 1994 Venice International Film Festival and won the Ciak d'oro prize, the Nastro d'Argento (Silver Ribbon) award and the prestigious David di Donatello Award in the "Best New Director" category. With this début, Paolo revealed his exceptional talent in directing actors and in mixing drama with humor.

In his next film Ferie d'agosto (1995), featuring a stunning cast (Silvio Orlando, Laura Morante, Ennio Fantastichini, Sabrina Ferilli and Piero Natoli), the island of Ventotene sets the scene for a feud between two families on holiday. In this comedy, Virzì reflects on the political revolution that took place in Italy after the introduction of the majority electoral system, Silvio Berlusconi's entry into politics and the subsequent transformation of a country called to choose between one of two opposed political formations. Ferie d'agosto won the David Award for Best Film of the year.

Ovosodo (Hardboiled Egg) (1997), named after a neighbourhood in Livorno, is one of Virzì's most personal films. The lead role is played by Edoardo Gabbriellini, one of the new Italian film talents discovered by Virzi. Despite its strong ties to local accents and lifestyle, Ovosodo received wide acclaim from critics and audiences alike: the jury of the Venice International Film Festival presided over by Jane Campion, awarded Paolo Virzì the Jury Grand Prix.

In 1999, Virzì directed Baci e abbracci (Kisses and Hugs), a blend of fable, social comedy and a Christmas tale à la Dickens. Yet its most obvious reference is to Gogol's The Inspector General that had already inspired Luigi Zampa's Anni ruggenti in 1962. Baci e abbracci is an ensemble piece about a group of ex-factory workers who try to start up an ostrich farm in the middle of Tuscany. In this movie, Virzì once again portrays Italian provincial society seduced by the irresistible appeal of modernity. His younger brother, Carlo Virzì, who plays the frontman of a band called "Snaporaz", is in fact the author of the music of several of Virzì's films and made his own film début in 2006 with L'estate del mio primo bacio, written and scripted by Paolo.

The financial troubles of Vittorio Cecchi Gori, producer and distributor of Virzì's first films, slowed down the making of My Name Is Tanino (2002). Shot between Sicily, Canada and the United States, the shooting of the film was beset with difficulties: the screenplay written by Virzì, Francesco Bruni and the writer Francesco Piccolo had to be rewritten several times during the filming to counter financial cutbacks. The main actor was once again a newcomer, Corrado Fortuna, who plays a young man who escapes from his native Sicily to go to the United States in pursuit of the American dream.

Virzì's next feature, Caterina va in città (Caterina in the Big City) (2003), is dedicated to Rome, a city loved and hated by the director, with its enthralling discoveries and its bitter set-backs. Young newcomer Alice Teghil plays the part of Caterina, a naive, provincial girl with a candid and disoriented view of the world. The film's young heroine is flung from the quiet town of Montalto di Castro into the Roman labyrinth, because her father – a frustrated small town intellectual engagingly played by Italian film and TV star, Sergio Castellitto – decides to move to the big city. Margherita Buy won the David di Donatello and the Nastro d'Argento awards for Best Supporting Actress in 2004 in the role of Caterina's mother, while Alice Teghil won the Guglelmo Biraghi award.

N (Io e Napoleone) (Napoleon and Me) (2006), adapted from the novel by Ernesto Ferrero, is Virzì's attempt at combining the Italian style comedy genre, with a historic period piece. The film focuses on the relationship between intellectuals and power and the 19th century plot is peppered with allusions to the present day: the parallel between Napoleon and Silvio Berlusconi is at times quite explicit. N features an international cast starring Elio Germano (assigned his first starring roles by Virzì and winner of Best Actor prize at the Cannes Film Festival in 2010), Monica Bellucci and Daniel Auteuil.

Virzì's next project, the ensemble piece Tutta la vita davanti, is a dark comedy with an apocalyptic vision of the world of work. It takes place in a call center, and discusses the theme of insecurity: in jobs, in love, in life. The cast sees Isabella Ragonese, Sabrina Ferilli and Micaela Ramazzotti. The film won several awards, including the Silver Ribbon and the Italian Globo d'oro for Best Film, the Ciak d'oro, for Best Film and Best Director.

In October 2008, the Annecy Cinéma Italien awarded Paolo Virzì the Sergio Leone Award in recognition for his overall career achievement. In August of the same year, Virzi and his film crew returned to his hometown of Livorno to shoot L'uomo che aveva picchiato la testa, a documentary about local singer-songwriter Bobo Rondelli. The film was produced by Motorino Amaranto, the film production company Virzì founded in 2001.

Again with production companies Motorino Amaranto and Indiana Production and once more in Livorno, in 2009 Virzì shot La prima cosa bella (The First Beautiful Thing), released in Italy on 15 January 2010. The film stars Micaela Ramazzotti, Valerio Mastandrea, Claudia Pandolfi and Stefania Sandrelli – the protagonist of films such as Bertolucci's The Conformist and Pietro Germi's Divorce, Italian Style. The film tells the story of the Michelucci family, from the 1970s to the present day: the central character is the stunningly beautiful Anna, the lively, frivolous and sometimes embarrassing mother of Bruno and Valeria. Everything begins in the summer of 1971, at the annual summer beauty pageant held at Livorno's most popular bathing establishment. Anna is unexpectedly crowned "Most Beautiful Mother", unwittingly stirring the violent jealousy of her husband. From then on chaos strikes the family and for Anna, Bruno and his sister Valeria, it is the start of an adventure that will end only thirty years later. Bruno ends up living in Milan after managing to escape from Livorno and his mother. He will return to his hometown at the end of the film to be at his mother's side during her last days.

The film received 18 nominations for the David di Donatello Award in 2010, winning three prizes for Best Screenplay (by Paolo Virzì with Francesco Bruni and Francesco Piccolo), for Best Actress (Micaela Ramazzotti) and Best Actor (Valerio Mastandrea). In July 2010, La prima cosa bella won 4 Silver Ribbon awards: Director of the Best Film of the Year (Paolo Virzì), Best Actress Micaela Ramazzotti and Stefania Sandrelli, Best Screenplay Paolo Virzì, Francesco Bruni, Francesco Piccolo) and Best Costume Design to the Oscar winner Gabriella Pescucci. The film attended many prestigious international film festivals: Open Roads, New York; Shanghai International Film Festival; Annecy Cinéma Italien Film Festival; NICE Italian Film Festival, San Francisco.

The European Film Academy shortlisted Paolo Virzì for the Best European Director award.

In September 2010, the Italian Film Industry Association (ANICA) selected La Prima Cosa Bella as Italy's Official Academy Award Entry for Best Foreign Language Film at the 83rd Academy Awards. On 9 November 2010, La prima cosa bella opened the Cinema Italian style Film Festival in Los Angeles. In January 2011, the film was presented at the Palm Springs International Film Festival.

La prima cosa bella was the Italian Oscar nomination as Best Foreign Language Film at the 83rd Academy Awards, but it did not make the final shortlist.

In October 2012, Every Blessed Day, his tenth feature film was released in Italy. Loosely based on the novel La generazione by Simone Lenzi (who is also the lead singer and composer of the alternative rock band Virginiana Miller), the film follows the lives of Guido and Antonia, played by Luca Marinelli and the singer-songwriter Thony, and their attempts to start a family.

In 2013, Virzì was appointed director of the 31st Torino Film Festival. His tenure was marked by a 30% increase in attendance.

In January 2014, Human Capital, Virzì's eleventh feature film was released in Italy. The movie, an adaptation of the novel by the American writer Stephen Amidon, uses the financial crisis as its backdrop but more broadly raises the question of values, monetary and intangible, in the modern world. The film was acclaimed by the public and the critics, but was also the object of controversy when politicians from the ultra-conservative Lega party objected to the portrayal of the Brianza region of northern Italy where the film is set.

At the Tribeca Film Festival, Valeria Bruni-Tedeschi won Best Actress for her leading role as the high-society housewife Carla Bernaschi. The film went on to receive 19 nominations for the 2014 David di Donatello awards, winning seven, including best film. The film also won a number of other major Italian awards including six Nastri d'Argento, four Ciak d'Oro, and the Globo d'Oro for best film selected by members of the international press. Human Capital was chosen as the official Italian entry for best foreign language film at the 2015 Academy Awards.

In 2016, La Pazza Gioia (Like Crazy) was released, with Micaela Ramazzottii and Valeria Bruni-Tedeschi as lead actresses. Virzì described the film as "a stroll outside a treatment center for women with issues in the open-air mental asylum known as Italy".

The film premiered as part of the Directors' Fortnight section of the Cannes Film Festival in 2016, and 400 copies were later distributed in Italian theaters starting from 17 May 2016.

Italian critics welcomed it very favorably. Fabio Ferzetti in Il Messaggero, wrote: "One of this season's most beautiful Italian films – and not only this season's". The critic then praised both the "extraordinary alchemy of the protagonists" who give themselves "without reservations to the characters, yet always maintain perfect control" and the script, "which condenses entire worlds in a single one-liner, offering non-trivial food for thought in the slew of misunderstandings between these two women, who represent two irreconcilable Italies". La Pazza Gioia won 5 Nastri d'Argento and obtained an impressive 17 David di Donatello nominations, winning five prizes including the Best Film Award and the Best Director Award.

In July of the same year, Paolo Virzì started principal photography for The Leisure Seeker, which has completed post-production. His new film, entirely shot in the United States, stars Donald Sutherland and Helen Mirren. It is freely adapted from the eponymous novel The Leisure Seeker by Michael Zadoorian. The script was co-written by Francesca Archibugi, Francesco Piccolo, Stephen Amidon, and Virzì himself. It is the story of Ella and John, of their escape from the care of doctors and their now adult children. He is scatterbrained yet strong, she is full of ailments but razor-sharp – they give each other the gift of an adventure on the roads of America, from Massachusetts to Key West, on board their old camper. The film was premiered at the 74th Venice International Film Festival and in Toronto in the TIFF 2017 Gala section.

In 2019 he was in the jury of the 76th International Exhibition of Cinematographic Art's main competition section.

== Personal life ==
On 17 January 2009, in Livorno, Virzì married actress Micaela Ramazzotti. Their first son (Virzi's second child) Jacopo, was born on 1 March 2010; a daughter, Anna, followed on 15 April 2013.

Virzì and Ramazzotti separated in November 2018 and reconciled in February 2019.

== Filmography ==
- Living It Up (1994)
- August Vacation (1995)
- Ovosodo (1997)
- Kisses and Hugs (1999)
- My Name Is Tanino (2002)
- Caterina in the Big City (2003)
- Napoleon and Me (2006)
- Your Whole Life Ahead of You (2008)
- The First Beautiful Thing (2010)
- Every Blessed Day (2012)
- Human Capital (2014)
- Like Crazy (2016)
- The Leisure Seeker (2017)
- Magical Nights (2018)
- Dry (2022)
- Another Summer Holiday (2024)
- Five Seconds (2025)
