= Giulia Elettra Gorietti =

Italian actress from Rome (born 1988)

- Born: 29 September 1988 (age 37); Rome, Italy
- Occupation: Actress

Giulia Elettra Gorietti (Rome, 29 September 1988) is an Italian actress.

== Life and career ==
Gorietti was born in Rome, Italy, from an Italian father and a German-Portuguese mother: at the age of 12 she joined the Italian Rhythmic gymnastics team, but she had to quit because of an accident.

She made her acting debut in 2003, with Caterina in the Big City, directed by Paolo Virzì, alongside Margherita Buy and Sergio Castellitto. In the following years, she had main roles in movies by directors Leonardo Pieraccioni and Luca Lucini, thus gaining a certain fame in Italy.

== Filmography ==
=== Films ===
- Caterina in the Big City, directed by Paolo Virzì (2003)
- Three Steps Over Heaven, directed by Luca Lucini (2004)
- L'uomo spezzato, directed by Stefano Calvagna (2005)
- I Love You in Every Language in the World, directed by Leonardo Pieraccioni (2005)
- Ho voglia di te, directed by Luis Prieto (2007)
- Ultimi della classe, directed by Luca Biglione (2008)
- Prigioniero di un segreto, directed by Carlo Fusco (2009)
- L'ultimo ultras, directed by Stefano Calvagna (2009)
- Suburra, directed by Stefano Sollima (2015)
- La cena di Natale, directed by Marco Ponti (2016)
- Manuel, directed by Dario Albertini (2017)
- We Still Talk, directed by Pupi Avati (2021)

=== TV ===
- Le ali, directed by Andrea Porporati (2008)
- Bakhita, directed by Giacomo Campiotti (2009)
- L'amore che non dura, directed by Stefano Calvagna (2009)
- I liceali 3, directed by Francesco Miccichè and Massimiliano Papi (2010)
- Terra Ribelle - Il Nuovo Mondo, directed by Ambrogio Lo Giudice (2012)

=== Short movies ===
- La notte bianca, directed by Luca Lucini (2004)

=== Videoclips ===
- Dalla pelle al cuore by Antonello Venditti, directed by Gaetano Morbioli (2007)
- Regali di Natale by Antonello Venditti, directed by Gaetano Morbioli (2007)
- I Keep Fallin' by NYLO, directed by Dave Depares (2011)
