= Magical Nights =

2018 Italian film directed by Paolo Virzi

- Notti magiche
- Directed by: Paolo Virzì
- Written by: Francesca Archibugi; Francesco Piccolo; Paolo Virzì
- Produced by: Marco Belardi; Ivan Fiorini
- Starring: Mauro Lamantia; Giovanni Toscano; Irene Vetere; Roberto Herlitzka; Giancarlo Giannini
- Cinematography: Vladan Radovic
- Edited by: Jacopo Quadri
- Music by: Carlo Virzì
- Production company: Rai Cinema
- Distributed by: 01 Distribution
- Release date: 8 November 2018
- Running time: 110 minutes
- Country: Italy
- Language: Italian

Notti magiche (Magical Nights) is an Italian comedy film directed by Paolo Virzì, an homage to the season of the Italian-style comedy.

== Plot ==
On 3 July 1990, during the semi-final between Italy and Argentina at the 1990 FIFA World Cup, a film producer is found dead in the Tiber and three young aspiring screenwriters are the main suspects in the murder. During a night in the barracks, their sentimental and ironic journey is traced, describing the splendour and misery of a glorious period of the Italian cinema that is slowly fading away.

== Cast ==
- Mauro Lamantia as Antonino Scordia
- Giovanni Toscano as Luciano Ambrogi
- Irene Vetere as Eugenia Malaspina
- Roberto Herlitzka as Fulvio Zappellini
- Giancarlo Giannini as Leandro Saponaro
- Ornella Muti as Federica
- Giulio Berruti as Max Andrei
- Giulio Scarpati as Salvatore Malaspina
- Paolo Bonacelli as Ennio

== Distribution ==
The film has been presented on 27 October 2018 at the Rome Film Festival and came out in the Italian theatres on 8 November 2018.
