= Corrado Fortuna =

Italian actor and director

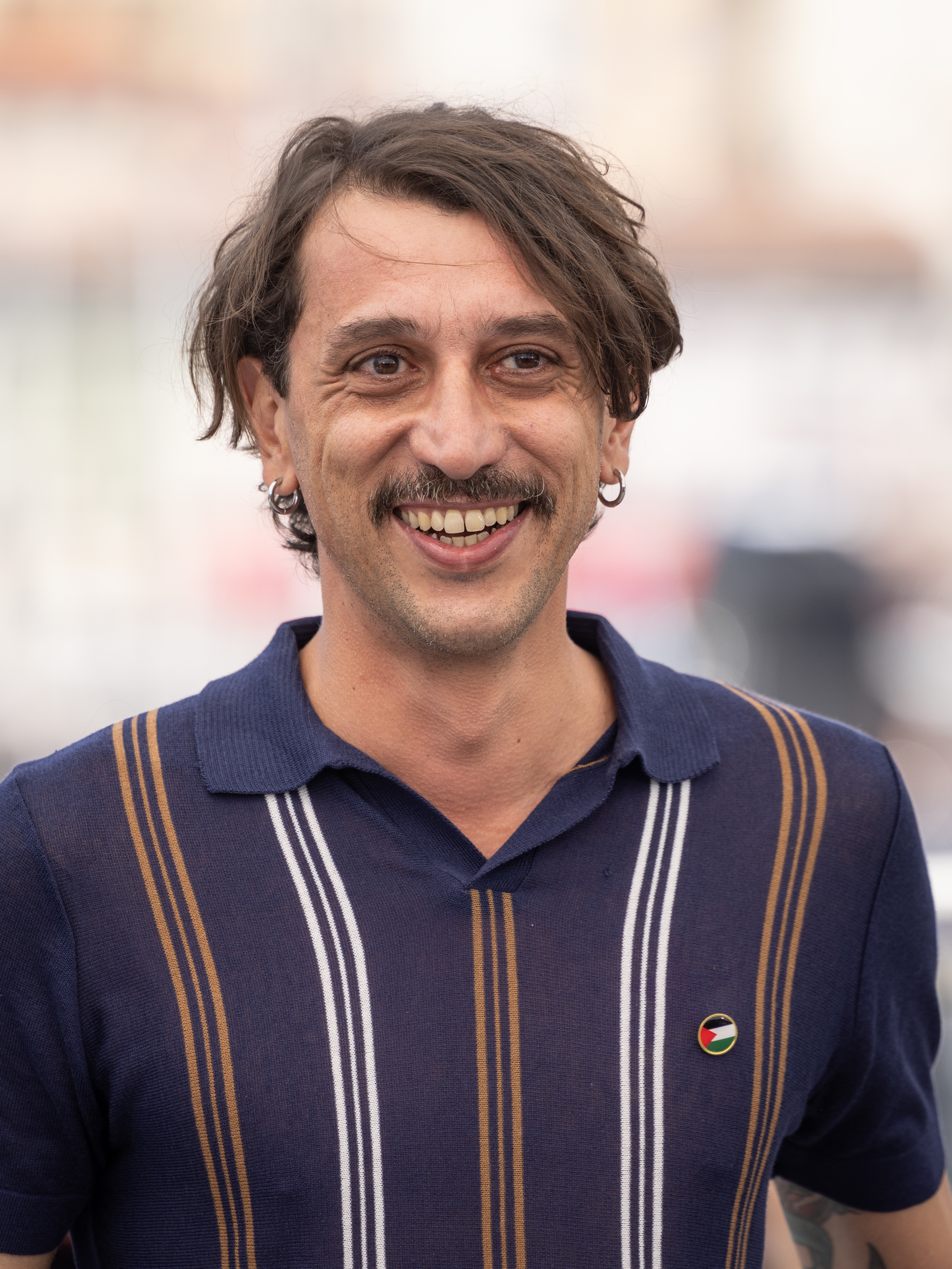
- Corrado Fortuna at the 2025 Cannes Film Festival
- Born: Corrado Fortuna; 31 March 1978 (age 48); Palermo, Sicily, Italy
- Occupations: Actor, director
- Years active: 2002–present

Corrado Fortuna (born 31 March 1978) is an Italian actor and director.

== Career ==
Born in Palermo, Fortuna debuted in 2002 with the title role in the film My Name Is Tanino, directed by Paolo Virzi, with whom he then worked as assistant director on the film Caterina in the Big City in 2003. In the same year, he played the title role in an autobiographical drama film that marked the directorial debut by singer-songwriter Franco Battiato, Lost Love. Thanks to his performance in My Name Is Tanino and Lost Love, in 2004 Fortuna won the "Guglielmo Biraghi" prize awarded by Italian Film Journalists Union. In the same year, he had a role in the film Come into the Light (the biography of Father Pino Puglisi, a priest murdered by the Mafia), directed by Roberto Faenza with Luca Zingaretti. In 2009 Fortuna returned to the cinema to star in Baaria, directed by Giuseppe Tornatore. In 2012 he had a small role in the film To Rome with Love directed by Woody Allen. In 2014, he was among the lead actors in Scusate se esisto!, with Paola Cortellesi and Raul Bova. Over the years, he developed simultaneously his acting career and his work as a director of documentaries and video clips. In 2014 he published his first novel, Un giorno sarai un posto bellissimo, published by Baldini & Castoldi.

== Filmography ==
=== Film ===
Year	Title	Role	Notes
2002	My Name Is Tanino	Gaetano "Tanino" Mendolia	
2003	Lost Love	Adult Ettore	
2003	Caterina in the Big City	Football player	Cameo appearance
2005	Come into the Light	Father Gregorio	
2006	Agente matrimoniale	Giovanni Maimone	
2008	The Early Bird Catches the Worm	Rosario Fiorello	
2008	Chi nasce tondo…	Gigino	
2008	Aspettando il sole	Coco	
2009	Una notte blu cobalto	Dino	Also writer
2009	Feisbum: The Movie	Antonio Iuorio	Segment: "Maledetto tag"
2009	Purple Sea	Ventura	
2009	Baarìa	Renato Guttuso	
2011	The Greatest of All	Ludovico Reviglio	
2012	Si può fare l'amore vestiti?	Andrea	
2012	To Rome with Love	Rocco	
2013	Amiche da morire	Lorenzo	
2014	Ladiesroom	Romolo	Short film
2014	Un fidanzato per mia moglie	Andrea Stanzani	
2014	Do You See Me?	Pietro	
2015	Era bellissima	Mario	Short film
2016	The Legend of Bob Wind	Roberto Cimetta	
2016	Attesa e cambiamenti	Gianni	
2016	Quel bravo ragazzo	Real estate agent	Cameo appearance
2017	Non c'è campo	Gualtiero Martelli	
2021	Il diritto alla felicità	Nicola	
2022	Tapirulàn	Max	
2022	Questa notte parlami dell'Africa	Dylan	
2023	Un weekend particolare	Bruno	
2023	La primavera della mia vita	The Mechanical	
2024	The Boy with Pink Pants	Tommaso Spezzacatena	
2025	Fuori	Angelo Pellegrino	
2026	Il dio dell'amore	Pietro	

=== Television ===
Year	Title	Role	Notes
2005	Cefalonia	Nicola	Two-parts television movie
2008	Inspector De Luca	Leopoldo Pugliese	Main role
2008–2011	Tutti pazzi per amore	Elio Franci	Main role (seasons 1-2); guest (season 3)
2010	Mia madre	Ettore	Two-parts television movie
2011	La nuova squadra	Benni	2 episodes
2017	Di padre in figlia	Giuseppe Nunzio	Main role
2020	La concessione del telefono - C'era una volta Vigata	Sasà La Ferlita	Television movie
2021	Anna	Damiano	2 episodes
2021	Purché finisca bene	Pasquale	Episode: "Tutta colpa della fata Morgana"
2024–present	Vanina	Dr. Manfredi Monterreale	Main role
2025	Real Men	Instructor	Episode: "Made in Italy"

=== Music videos ===
Year	Title	Artist(s)
2015	"Ciao per sempre"	Levante
2019	"Giorni buoni"	Dimartino

== Notes ==
This article originated as a translation of this version of its counterpart in the Italian-language Wikipedia.
