= Another Summer Holiday =

2024 comedy-drama film

- Directed by: Paolo Virzì
- Screenplay by: Paolo Virzì; Francesco Bruni; Carlo Virzì
- Starring: Silvio Orlando; Sabrina Ferilli; Christian De Sica; Laura Morante; Andrea Carpenzano; Vinicio Marchioni; Anna Ferraioli Ravel; Emanuela Fanelli; Rocco Papaleo; Paola Tiziana Cruciani; Agnese Claisse
- Cinematography: Guido Michelotti
- Edited by: Jacopo Quadri
- Music by: Battista Lena
- Release date: 2024
- Language: Italian

Another Summer Holiday (Italian: Un altro ferragosto) is a 2024 Italian comedy-drama film co-written and directed by Paolo Virzì. It is the sequel of Virzì's 1996 film August Vacation.

== Cast ==
- Silvio Orlando as Sandro Molino
- Sabrina Ferilli as Marisa
- Christian De Sica as Pierluigi Nardi Masciulli
- Laura Morante as Cecilia Sarcoli
- Andrea Carpenzano as Altiero Molino
- Vinicio Marchioni as Cesare Conocchia
- Anna Ferraioli Ravel as Sabrina "Sabry" Mazzalupi
- Emanuela Fanelli as Daniela
- Gigio Alberti as Roberto
- Paola Tiziana Cruciani as Luciana Mazzalupi
- Silvio Vannucci as Mauro Santucci
- Raffaella Lebboroni as Betta
- Claudia Della Seta as Graziella
- Agnese Claisse as Martina Santucci
- Lele Vannoli as Cozzolino
- Milena Mancini as Senator Ascione
- Rocco Papaleo as Pampiglione
- Lorenzo Balducci as Corchiani
