= The Greatest of All =

- Directed by: Carlo Virzì
- Produced by: Indiana Production Company, Motorino Amaranto; coproduced with Rai Cinema; in association with Eagle Pictures
- Starring: Claudia Pandolfi; Alessandro Roja; Marco Cocci; Corrado Fortuna; Dario Cappanera; Claudia Potenza; Frankie Hi-NRG MC; Catherine Spaak
- Cinematography: Ferran Paredes
- Music by: Carlo Virzì
- Release date: 2011
- Country: Italy

The Greatest of All (Italian: I più grandi di tutti) is a 2011 Italian musical comedy film directed by Carlo Virzì. It entered the competition at the 2011 Turin Film Festival.

== Cast ==
- Claudia Pandolfi: Sabrina Cenci
- Alessandro Roja: Loris Vanni
- Marco Cocci: Mao Maurilio Fantini
- Corrado Fortuna: Ludovico Reviglio
- Dario Cappanera: Rino Falorni
- Frankie hi-nrg mc: Saverio
- Baustelle: themselves
- Irene Grandi: herself
- Litfiba : themselves
- Vasco Rossi: himself
- Tre allegri ragazzi morti: themselves

== See also ==
- List of Italian films of 2011
