= Carlo Virzì =

Italian composer

- Born: June 2, 1972 (age 53); Livorno, Tuscany, Italy
- Occupations: musician, screenwriter, director
- Years active: 1997–present

Carlo Virzì (Italian pronunciation: [ˈkarlo virˈdzi]; born 2 June 1972) is an Italian musician, director and screenwriter.

Born in Livorno, Virzì was the singer and guitarist of the rock band Snaporaz from 1997 to 2001; he is also the composer of the soundtracks for many films of his brother Paolo Virzì. His first film as director and screenwriter was L'estate del mio primo bacio (2006).

In 2011, the Bari International Film Festival awarded him the Ennio Morricone Prize for the best composer for the film The First Beautiful Thing.

== Filmography ==
=== Director ===
- L'estate del mio primo bacio (2006)
- The Greatest of All (Italian: I più grandi di tutti) (2012)

=== Screenwriter ===
- L'estate del mio primo bacio (2006)
- I liceali (English: the students of high school) 2008,
- The Greatest of All (2012)
- Another Summer Holiday (2024)

=== Composer ===
- Ovosodo , directed by Paolo Virzì (1997, like Snaporaz)
- Hugs and kisses , directed by Paolo Virzì (1999, like Snaporaz)
- My Name Is Tanino , directed by Paolo Virzì (2002)
- Caterina in the Big City , directed by Paolo Virzì (2003)
- L'estate del mio primo bacio (2006)
- The First Beautiful Thing , directed by Paolo Virzì (2010)
- The Greatest of All (2012)
- Human Capital (Italian: Il capitale umano) , directed by Paolo Virzì (2014)
- God Willing (Italian: Se Dio vuole) (2015)
- Like Crazy (Italian: La pazza gioia) , directed by Paolo Virzì (2016)
- Friends by Chance, directed by Francesco Bruni (2017)
- The Leisure Seeker, directed by Paolo Virzì (2017)
- Magical Nights (Italian: Notti magiche), directed by Paolo Virzì (2018)
- Felicità (2023)
