= Living It Up (1994 film) =

- Directed by: Paolo Virzì
- Written by: Paolo Virzì; Francesco Bruni
- Produced by: Roberto Cimpanelli
- Starring: Claudio Bigagli; Sabrina Ferilli; Massimo Ghini
- Cinematography: Paolo Carnera
- Edited by: Sergio Montanari
- Music by: Claudio Cimpanelli
- Release date: 1994
- Country: Italy
- Language: Italian

Living It Up (Italian: La bella vita, lit. 'The good life') is a 1994 Italian comedy drama film. The film premiered at the 51st Venice International Film Festival. It is the debut film of Paolo Virzì, who won the David di Donatello for Best New Director and the Nastro d'Argento in the same category.

== Plot ==
Bruno and Mirella get married in 1989 and live in the little town of Piombino. Their life seems to be blissful. Suddenly Bruno is out of a job, and the financial pressure creates a wedge between husband and wife. This is when Mirella gets attached to a local tv idol, Gerry Fumo. A forbidden love affair between Mirella and Gerry starts. As a result complications between the married couple arise and they separate. Mirella and Gerry become a couple and start living together. After sometime Bruno can't take anymore disgrace of being a cuckold, has a cardiac arrest and is admitted to a hospital. Upon hearing the news Mirella realizes that Bruno can’t stand being without her, she repents and leaves Gerry. Bruno and Mirella reconcile and try again, but they soon realize that the old feelings between them has disappeared. Mirella goes back to her parents' house and begins to work in a kindergarten, while Bruno finds a job at the local beach. The two begin to exchange a tender correspondence.

== Cast ==
- Claudio Bigagli as Bruno
- Sabrina Ferilli as Mirella
- Massimo Ghini as Gerry Fumo
- Giorgio Algranti as Renato
- Emanuele Barresi as Luciano
- Ugo Bencini as Oreste
- Paola Tiziana Cruciani as Rossella
- Raffaella Lebboroni as Marisa Cavedoni
- Mario Erpichini as MontePaschi director

== See also ==
- List of Italian films of 1994
