= Friends by Chance =

2017 Italian film

- Directed by: Francesco Bruni
- Screenplay by: Francesco Bruni
- Starring: Giuliano Montaldo; Andrea Carpenzano; Side Baby; Antonio Gerardi; Donatella Finocchiaro
- Cinematography: Arnaldo Catinari
- Edited by: Cecilia Zanuso
- Music by: Carlo Virzì
- Distributed by: 01 Distribution
- Release date: 2017
- Language: Italian

Friends by Chance (Italian: Tutto quello che vuoi) is a 2017 Italian comedy-drama film written and directed by Francesco Bruni.

Loosely based on a novel by Cosimo Calamini, the film premiered at the Bari International Film Festival. For his performance, Giuliano Montaldo was awarded the David di Donatello for Best Supporting Actor and a special Nastro d'Argento. The film also won the David di Donatello for Best Screenplay.

== Plot ==
The unlikely friendship between a 22-year-old scoundrel and an 85-year-old poet.

== Cast ==
- Andrea Carpenzano as Alessandro
- Giuliano Montaldo as Giorgio Gherarducci
- Arturo Bruni as Riccardo
- Emanuele Propizio as Tommi
- Riccardo Vitiello as Leo
- Donatella Finocchiaro as Claudia
- Antonio Gerardi as Alessandro's father
- Raffaella Lebboroni as Laura
- Andrea Lehotská as Regina
- Carolina Pavone as Zoe
- Aurora Quattrocchi as Mendicante
