= Almost America =

2001 Canadian-Italian film

- Italian: Come l'America
- Written by: Sandro Petraglia; Stefano Rulli
- Directed by: Antonio Frazzi; Andrea Frazzi
- Starring: Sabrina Ferilli; Massimo Ghini; Henry Czerny; Tony Nardi
- Music by: Luis Bacalov
- Country of origin: Canada; Italy
- Original languages: English; Italian

Production
- Producers: Stefano Dammicco; Bruce Harvey
- Cinematography: André Pienaar
- Editor: Bridget Durnford
- Running time: 120 minutes
- Production companies: Eagle Pictures; Illusions Entertainment

Original release
- Release: 2001

Almost America (Italian: Come l'America) is a Canadian-Italian drama film, directed by Antonio and Andrea Frazzi and released in 2001.

The film centres on the Di Vitos, an Italian family who emigrate to Canada. Sabrina Ferilli stars as Antonia, who brings her children and her sister Paola (Gioia Spaziani) to Canada to join her husband Vincenzo (Tony Nardi), who came two years earlier to find work and build a home for his family; however, after discovering that Vincenzo began a relationship with another woman and fathered a child with her during his absence, she takes her children to Edmonton, Alberta to raise them as a single mother. In Edmonton she befriends Mario (Massimo Ghini), a truck driver who becomes a new love interest for her and a father figure to her children, and trains as a nurse, eventually taking a job in the medical office of doctor Steven (Henry Czerny).

The film was released in Canada as a theatrical film, but in Italy as a television miniseries.

At the 23rd Genie Awards in 2003, François Séguin won the Genie Award for Best Art Direction or Production Design, and Wendy Partridge was nominated for Best Costume Design.
