= Everything's Gonna Be Alright (film) =

2020 Italian film

- Directed by: Francesco Bruni
- Screenplay by: Francesco Bruni
- Starring: Kim Rossi Stuart
- Cinematography: Carlo Rinaldi
- Edited by: Luca Carrera; Alessandro Heffler
- Music by: Ratchev & Carratello
- Release date: 2020
- Language: Italian

Everything's Gonna Be Alright (Italian: Cosa sarà) is a 2020 Italian comedy-drama film written and directed by Francesco Bruni and starring Kim Rossi Stuart.

== Cast ==
- Kim Rossi Stuart as Bruno Salvati
- Lorenza Indovina as Anna
- Barbara Ronchi as Fiorella
- Giuseppe Pambieri as Umberto
- Ninni Bruschetta as Producer
- Raffaella Lebboroni as Doctor
- Fotinì Peluso as Adele
- Nicola Nocella as Nicola

== Production ==
The semi-autobiographical screenplay is loosely based on the fight of the director Francesco Bruni against leukemia. The film was shot in Livorno.

== Release ==
The film was supposed to be released in Italian cinemas on 20 March 2020 with the title Andrà tutto bene, but because of the COVID-19 pandemic it faced the first Italian lockdown and its distribution was tempararely shelved. It was screened as closure film at the 2020 Rome Film Fest, and was released in Italy on 24 October 2020. It was made available on demand one week later.

== Reception ==
The film won two Nastro d'Argento awards for best actor (Kim Rossi Stuart) and best screenplay, and it received David di Donatello nominations in the same categories. Rossi Stuart also won the Globo d'oro for best actor.
