= Me, Myself and Her =

2015 film by Maria Sole Tognazzi

- Directed by: Maria Sole Tognazzi
- Written by: Maria Sole Tognazzi; Ivan Cotroneo; Francesca Marciano
- Starring: Margherita Buy; Sabrina Ferilli
- Cinematography: Arnaldo Catinari
- Edited by: Walter Fasano
- Music by: Gabriele Roberto
- Release date: 1 October 2015
- Running time: 102 minutes
- Country: Italy
- Language: Italian

Me, Myself and Her (Italian: Io e lei [ˈiːo e lˈlɛi]) is a 2015 comedy-drama film written and directed by Maria Sole Tognazzi and starring Margherita Buy and Sabrina Ferilli.

== Plot ==
Marina and Federica have been in a relationship for five years and seem to be a stable and loving couple, despite having very different personalities. Marina, a former actress, is outgoing and expressive, while Federica is reserved and private. Trouble comes to their little paradise when Marina gives an interview and when pressed about her love life mentions Federica's name and profession. Federica's co-workers find out about her orientation, which upsets Federica. Marina, on the other hand, feels that after five years Federica should be able to come out.

Stefano, a director who has always admired Marina, presses her to accept a role in his latest comedy, a role which he wrote specifically for her. Marina hasn't played a role in 15 years, but accepts this one, in part because Federica tries somewhat clumsily to make her turn it down.

Meanwhile, by chance, Federica meets Marco, an old acquaintance she hasn't seen in years. They were attracted to each other many years ago, but at that time Federica was with her now ex-husband Sergio. While Marina is filming in Milan, Federica has an affair with Marco, which is discovered by Marina via a text message. Marina follows Federica to her next rendezvous and breaks it up. Given an ultimatum by Marina, Federica at first submits to Marina's demands, but after a time finds that she cannot live this way, constantly suspected and under scrutiny. Needing time to herself to reflect on what she really wants, she moves out, first crashing at her son Bernardo's place, then setting up a small living quarters in her office, and finally moving in with Marco.

Marina, hit hard by this abandonment, is supported by her family and her ex-flame and current work assistant Camilla. Having decided that it was a mistake to accept the role, Marina goes to tell the director that she can't continue (even though this would leave him in the lurch), but is miraculously spared this difficult conversation when he tells her that the financial backers have killed the project.

After failing once more to regain her driver's license, Federica feels that she has messed everything up. At a dinner with Marco at the home of Sergio and his new family, while the two men talk with great enthusiasm of fishing, she slips out and goes to Marina's place. Marina, who feels she is finally over Federica, doesn't want to invite her in, so the two have a confrontation on the doorstep. Federica is now sure it is the relationship with Marina that she wants, but Marina, after detailing the awful way Federica has treated her, asks for six months to figure out whether she can try again.

Federica understands and accepts this, but when she leaves, Marina suddenly changes her mind and, running down several flights of stairs, tells Federica that six months is too long. The two share a passionate kiss.

== Cast ==
- Margherita Buy as Federica Salvini
- Sabrina Ferilli as Marina Baldi
- Fausto Maria Sciarappa as Marco
- Alessia Barela as Camilla
- Domenico Diele as Bernardo
- Ennio Fantastichini as Sergio
- Massimiliano Gallo as Stefano
- Anna Bellato as Anna
- Antonio Zavatteri as Carlo
- Dennis Olazo as Rolando the maid

== Awards ==
Year	Award	Category	Result
2016	David di Donatello Awards	Best Actress (Sabrina Ferilli)	Nominated
2016	Golden Ciak Awards	Best Actress (Sabrina Ferilli)	Won
2016	Golden Ciak Awards	Best Supporting Actress (Alessia Barela)	Nominated
2016	Golden Ciak Awards	Best Score (Gabriele Roberto)	Nominated
2016	Italian National Syndicate of Film Journalists	Best Original Story	Won
2016	Italian National Syndicate of Film Journalists	Best Comedy	Nominated
2016	Italian National Syndicate of Film Journalists	Best Actress (Sabrina Ferilli)	Nominated
2016	Italian National Syndicate of Film Journalists	Best Producer	Nominated
2016	Paris Lesbian and Feminist Film Festival	Best Feature Film	Won

== See also ==
- List of Italian films of 2015
- List of LGBT-related films directed by women
