= The Man Who Loves =

- Directed by: Maria Sole Tognazzi
- Written by: Ivan Cotroneo; Maria Sole Tognazzi
- Starring: Pierfrancesco Favino; Kseniya Rappoport; Monica Bellucci
- Cinematography: Arnaldo Catinari
- Edited by: Walter Fasano
- Music by: Carmen Consoli
- Release date: 2008
- Country: Italy
- Language: Italian

The Man Who Loves (Italian: L'uomo che ama) is a 2008 Italian romance-drama film directed by Maria Sole Tognazzi. It was the opening film at the 2008 Rome Film Festival.

== Cast ==
- Pierfrancesco Favino: Roberto
- Kseniya Rappoport: Sara
- Monica Bellucci: Alba
- Marisa Paredes: Dr. Campo
- Michele Alhaique: Carlo
- Arnaldo Ninchi: Vittorio
- Piera Degli Esposti: Giulia

== See also ==
- List of Italian films of 2008
