= Dreamfools =

2018 film

- Directed by: Francesco Miccichè
- Screenplay by: Fabio Bonifacci; Francesco Miccichè
- Produced by: Fulvio Lucisano; Federica Lucisano
- Starring: Sergio Castellitto; Sabrina Ferilli
- Cinematography: Arnaldo Catinari
- Edited by: Patrizio Marone
- Music by: Francesco Cerasi
- Distributed by: 01 Distribution
- Release date: 2018
- Language: Italian

Dreamfools (Italian: Ricchi di fantasia) is a 2018 Italian comedy film co-written and directed by Francesco Miccichè and starring Sergio Castellitto and Sabrina Ferilli.

== Cast ==
- Sergio Castellitto as Sergio
- Sabrina Ferilli as Sabrina
- Valeria Fabrizi as Carmen
- Matilde Gioli as Letizia
- Antonio Catania as Pier Barbara Pallarini
- Antonella Attili as Sonia
- Gianfranco Gallo as Saverio
- Paolo Calabresi as Nando
- Paola Tiziana Cruciani as Carla
- Luigi Imola as Brando
- Siria Simeoni as Angela
- Vincenzo Sebastiani as Artemio
- Uccio De Santis as the real estate agent

== Production ==
The film was produced by Fulvio and Federica Lucisano. Principal photography started on 20 September 2017. The film was shot between Rome and Apulia, particularly in Bari, Polignano and Monopoli.

== Release ==
The film was released on Italian cinemas on 27 September 2018.

== Reception ==
Corriere della Sera's Paolo Baldini described the film as "an ultra-classical, comforting and reassuring commedia all'italiana", of which the highlight are the duets between Castellitto and Ferilli, that are reminiscent of Alberto Sordi and Monica Vitti's films. According to Giancarlo Zappoli from Mymovies.it the film "is not just an homage to the classic "commedia all'italiana" [...] but goes further by proposing a critical reading of the present, while keeping away from sterile imitation attempts".
