= Kisses and Hugs =

- Directed by: Paolo Virzì
- Written by: Francesco Bruni; Paolo Virzì
- Produced by: Rita Rusić; Vittorio Cecchi Gori
- Starring: Francesco Paolantoni
- Cinematography: Alessandro Pesci
- Edited by: Jacopo Quadri
- Music by: Snaporaz
- Release date: 22 January 1999
- Running time: 104 minutes
- Language: Italian

Kisses and Hugs (Italian: Baci e abbracci) is a 1999 Italian comedy film written and directed by Paolo Virzì.

== Cast ==
- Francesco Paolantoni as Mario Mataluna
- Massimo Gambacciani as Renato Bacci
- Daniela Morozzi as Ivana Bacci
- Paola Tiziana Cruciani as Tatiana Falorni
- Isabella Cecchi as Annalisa Brodolini
- Pietro Gremigni as Luciano Cecconi
- Emanuele Barresi as Ennio
- Edoardo Gabbriellini as Alessio Bacci
