= Come into the Light =

- Directed by: Roberto Faenza
- Starring: Luca Zingaretti; Alessia Goria; Corrado Fortuna
- Cinematography: Italo Petriccione
- Music by: Andrea Guerra
- Release date: 2005
- Running time: 89 minutes
- Country: Italy
- Language: Italian

Come into the Light (Italian: Alla luce del sole, lit. 'By the Light of Day', also known as In the Light of the Sun) is a 2005 Italian biographical drama film directed by Roberto Faenza.

It is loosely based on real life events of Roman Catholic priest Pino Puglisi, who was killed by the Mafia in 1993.

== Cast ==
- Luca Zingaretti as don Pino Puglisi
- Alessia Goria as Sister Carolina
- Corrado Fortuna as Gregorio
- Giovanna Bozzolo as Anita
- Francesco Foti as Filippo Graviano
- Piero Nicosia as Giuseppe Graviano
- Lollo Franco as Gaspare
- Lorenzo Randazzo as Domenico
- Mario Giunta as Saro
- Gabriele Castagna as Rosario
- Salvo Scelta as Carmelo
- Mimmo Mignemi as Leoluca Bagarella
- Adriano Chiaramida as the politician I run
- Benedetto Raneli as Mayor
