= The Early Bird Catches the Worm =

- Directed by: Francesco Patierno
- Starring: Elio Germano; Laura Chiatti; Martina Stella; Umberto Orsini
- Cinematography: Mauro Marchetti
- Music by: Pivio and Aldo De Scalzi
- Release date: 2008
- Country: Italy

The Early Bird Catches the Worm (Italian: Il mattino ha l'oro in bocca) is a 2008 Italian drama film directed by Francesco Patierno, based on autobiographical book Il giocatore (ogni scomessa e un debito) by Marco Baldini.

== Cast ==
- Elio Germano as Marco Baldini
- Laura Chiatti as Cristiana
- Martina Stella as Cristina
- Carlo Monni as Marco's father
- Raffaella Lebboroni as Marco's Mother
- Corrado Fortuna as Rosario Fiorello
- Donato Placido as Giggetto
- Dario Vergassola as Claudio Cecchetto
- Gianmarco Tognazzi as Danny
- Umberto Orsini as Zio Lino
- Chiara Francini as Loredana
