= Fatto su misura =

- Directed by: Francesco Laudadio
- Cinematography: Cristiano Pogany
- Music by: Claudio Mattone
- Release date: 1985
- Language: Italian

Fatto su misura is a 1985 Italian comedy film directed by Francesco Laudadio.

== Cast ==
- Ricky Tognazzi. Ricky
- Lara Wendel: Lisa
- Ugo Tognazzi: Professor Nathan
- Senta Berger: Miss Schwartz
- Antonello Fassari
- Rodolfo Laganà
- Alessandro Benvenuti
- Liliana Eritrei
- Silvio Vannucci
- Renato Scarpa
- Ugo Gregoretti
- Paola Tiziana Cruciani
