= Sabrina Ferilli =

Italian actress (born 1964)

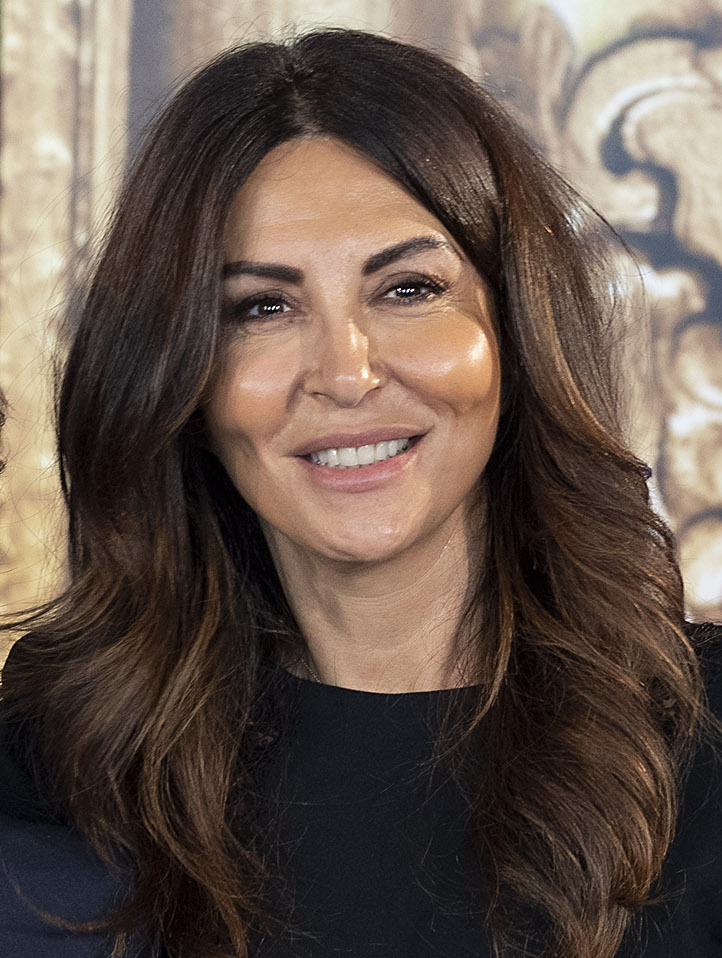
- Ferilli in 2022
- Born: 28 June 1964 (age 62); Rome, Italy
- Occupation: Actress
- Years active: 1986–present

Sabrina Ferilli (born 28 June 1964) is an Italian theatre and film actress. She has won five Nastro d'Argento (including a special award in 2016 for civil engagement for her performance in Me, Myself and Her), a Globo d'oro, six Ciak d'oro and received four David di Donatello nominations. In 2013, she was a protagonist of the Oscar-winning film The Great Beauty directed by Paolo Sorrentino.

== Early and personal life ==
Ferilli was born in Rome on 28 June 1964. Her father, also from Rome, was a spokesman for the Italian Communist Party in the region of Lazio, and her mother, who grew up in Fiano Romano, was a housewife and native of Caserta, Southern Italy. She attended the liceo classico Orazio ("Horace Classical High School") in Rome. After having unsuccessfully attempted to enter the Centro Sperimentale di Cinematografia in Rome, she began her career as a film actress in secondary parts, acting in Sweets from a Stranger by Franco Ferrini, and small roles in second-tier films at the end of 1980s.

Ferilli was married to Italian lawyer Andrea Perone from 2003 to 2005. Since 2011, she has been married to manager Flavio Cattaneo.

== Career ==
In 1990, Alessandro D'Alatri cast her in a small role for the movie Red American. In 1993 she appeared in the comedy Anche i commercialisti hanno un'anima alongside Enrico Montesano and Renato Pozzetto; Law of Courage with Giulio Scarpati and in Marco Ferreri's Diary of a Maniac.

The following year she had a breakthrough role in Living It Up by Paolo Virzì, which won her the Silver Ribbon for Best Actress, and a David di Donatello nomination for Best Actress. In subsequent years she appeared in comedies, including Paolo Virzì's 1996 August Vacation, Alessandro Benvenuti's Return to Home Gori in the same year, and 1998's Mr. Fifteen Balls by Francesco Nuti.

Ferilli hosted the Sanremo Festival 1996 along with Pippo Baudo and Valeria Mazza.

She later also worked in theatre in some comedy productions by Pietro Garinei and Sandro Giovannini, including Rugantino and Let's Try More, and made appearances in some television comedies.

In 2000, she modeled for a Max calendar, which has sold over 1 million copies.

On 24 June 2001, to celebrate the scudetto for AS Roma, she performed a dance at Circus Maximus in front of hundreds of thousands of fans. She had a lead role in the controversial 2003 film The Water ... the Fire by Luciano Emmer which debuted at the Venice Film Festival.

She later participated in several Italian Christmas comedies known as cinepanettoni: Christmas in Love, Natale a New York, Natale a Beverly Hills and Vacanze di Natale a Cortina. She defended her work in less serious films by saying, "How do you call them? Cinepanettoni? Well, then I'm happy to be associated with it because I love panettones, turrus and pandora."

In 2008, she appeared in Virzì's Your Whole Life Ahead of You, once again winning the Silver Ribbon. In 2013, she was chosen as a judge in the twelfth edition of Friends of Maria De Filippi and also appeared in the subsequent season. In the same year, she starred in Eros Puglielli' TV series We Kiss Our Hands – Palermo New York 1958 on Canale 5, and was chosen as the opening presenter of the Roma Film Festival.

Her 2013 performance as one of the protagonists in The Great Beauty by Paolo Sorrentino helped the film to win the Oscar for Best Foreign Film Best Foreign Film on 2 March 2014.

In December 2014, she debuted on the new Agon Channel with the talk show Contratto with Luca Zanforlin. On 11 April 2015, she appeared in the fourteenth edition of Amici di Maria De Filippi with Francesco Renga and Loredana Bertè.

In 2015, she starred with Margherita Buy in Me, Myself and Her by Maria Sole Tognazzi, a lesbian retelling of Édouard Molinaro's La Cage aux Folles. The actress said she was very happy to have participated in a movie like this: "In a bigoted country like ours "Me and Her" can be important because it is a story that is not scary, to divide. I like to call it a homosexual story because the point of strength of this relationship is not gender, but feelings." She was awarded a Golden Ciak at Best Actress for the film and was nominated for the David di Donatello and Silver Ribbon for Best Actress.

Beginning in April 2016, she was again in the jury of the 15th edition of Amici di Maria De Filippi with singers Anna Oxa and Loredana Bertè.

== Filmography ==
=== Films ===
Title	Year	Role(s)	Director	Notes
Sweets from a Stranger	1987	Prostitute	Franco Ferrini	Cameo appearance
The Rogues	1987	Young woman	Mario Monicelli	Uncredited
The Sparrow's Fluttering	1988	The woman of stars	Gianfranco Mingozzi	
Il volpone	1988	Rosalba Marignano	Maurizio Ponzi	
Rimini Rimini - Un anno dopo	1988	Waitress	Bruno Corbucci	Segment: "La scelta"
Night Club	1989	Erina	Sergio Corbucci	
Red American	1991	Zaira	Alessandro D'Alatri	
Naufraghi sotto costa	1991	Jole	Marco Colli	
Donne sottotetto	1992	Diana	Roberto Giannarelli	
Vietato ai minori	1992	Barbara	Maurizio Ponzi	
Diary of a Maniac	1993	Luigia	Marco Ferreri	
Law of Courage	1994	Angela Guarnera	Alessandro Di Robilant	
Anche i commercialisti hanno un'anima	1994	Sonia	Maurizio Ponzi	
Living It Up	1994	Mirella	Paolo Virzì	
Strangled Lives	1996	Miriam	Ricky Tognazzi	
August Vacation	1996	Marisa	Paolo Virzì	
Arance amare	1996	Alice	Michel Such	
Return to Home Gori	1996	Sandra Salvini	Alessandro Benvenuti	
You Laugh	1998	Nora	Paolo and Vittorio Taviani	
Mr. Fifteen Balls	1998	Sissi	Francesco Nuti	
I fobici	1999	The woman	Giancarlo Scarchilli	Segment: "Frutto proibito"
Le giraffe	2000	Roberta Tiberi	Claudio Bonivento	
Freewheeling	2000	Nurse Silvia	Vincenzo Salemme	
L'acqua… il fuoco	2003	Stefania / Elena / Stella	Luciano Emmer	
Christmas in Love	2004	Lisa Pinzoni	Neri Parenti	
Really SSSupercool: Chapter Two	2006	Nunzia	Carlo Vanzina	
Cars	2006	Sally Carrera (voice)	John Lasseter, Joe Ranft	Italian voice-over
Mater and the Ghostlight	2006	Sally Carrera (voice)	John Lasseter, Joe Ranft	Italian voice-over; short film
Natale a New York	2006	Barbara Ricacci	Neri Parenti	
Your Whole Life Ahead of You	2008	Daniela	Paolo Virzì	
I mostri oggi	2009	Stefania	Enrico Oldoini	Segment: "Il malconcio"
I mostri oggi	2009	Sabrina	Enrico Oldoini	Segment: "La fine del mondo"
I mostri oggi	2009	Alice	Enrico Oldoini	Segment: "Euro più euro meno"
Natale a Beverly Hills	2009	Cristina	Neri Parenti	
Cars 2	2011	Sally Carrera (voice)	John Lasseter, Brad Lewis	Italian voice-over
Vacanze di Natale a Cortina	2011	Elena Covelli	Neri Parenti	
The Great Beauty	2013	Ramona	Paolo Sorrentino	
Me, Myself and Her	2015	Marina Baldi	Maria Sole Tognazzi	
Forever Young	2016	Angela	Fausto Brizzi	
Ballerina	2016	Régine Le Haut (voice)	Éric Summer, Éric Warin	Italian voice-over
Omicidio all'italiana	2017	Donatella Spruzzone	Maccio Capatonda	
Cars 3	2017	Sally Carrera (voice)	Brian Free	Italian voice-over
The Place	2017	Angela	Paolo Genovese	
Dreamfools	2018	Sabrina	Francesco Miccichè	
Onward	2020	Laurel Lightfoot (voice)	Dan Scanlon	Italian voice-over
Il sesso degli angeli	2022	Lena	Leonardo Pieraccioni	
Another Summer Holiday	2024	Marisa	Paolo Virzì	
The Forbidden City	2025	Lorena	Gabriele Mainetti	
Notte prima degli esami 3.0	2026	Professor Castelli	Tommaso Renzoni	
Nella gioia e nel dolore †	TBA	TBA	Ferzan Özpetek	Filming

=== Television ===
Title	Year	Role(s)	Network	Notes
Naso di cane	1986	Prostitute	Rai 2	3 episodes
I ragazzi della 3ª C	1987	Girl from Sardinia	Italia 1	Episode: "A Carnevale ogni scherzo vale"
The Ogre	1988	Anna	Italia 1	Television movie
Valentina	1989	Edna	Italia 1	Episode: "Rembrant e le streghe"
Senza scampo	1990	Lucia	Rai 1	Television movie
Una storia italiana	1993	Matilde	Rai 1	Miniseries
Un commissario a Roma	1993	Patrizia Spinosi	Rai 1	Episode: "Specchio d'acqua"
Sanremo Music Festival 1996	1996	Herself / co-host	Rai 1	Annual music festival
Mai dire Gol	1996–1997	Herself / co-host	Italia 1	Sports/comedy show (season 7)
Il padre di mia figlia	1997	Lisa	Canale 5	Television movie
Leo e Beo	1998	Laura	Canale 5	Television movie
Commesse	1999–2002	Marta De Santis	Rai 1	12 episodes
Le ali della vita	2000–2001	Rosanna Ranzi	Canale 5	4 episodes
Almost America	2001	Antonia	Rai 1	Television movie
Cuore di donna	2002	Flavia	Rai 1	Television movie
Rivoglio i miei figli	2004	Sonia	Canale 5	Miniseries
Al di là delle frontiere	2004	Angela Ghiglino	Rai 1	Television movie
Lives of the Saints	2004	Cristina Innocente	Canale 5	Miniseries
Dalida	2005	Iolanda "Dalida" Gigliotti	Canale 5	Television movie
Angela – Matilde – Lucia	2006	Angela / Matilde / Lucia	Canale 5	Trilogy television movies
Due imbroglioni e… mezzo!	2007	Gina	Canale 5	Television movie
Anna e i cinque	2008–2011	Anna Modigliani	Canale 5	12 episodes
Cars Toons	2009–2015	Sally Carrera (voice)	Disney Channel	15 episodes
Due imbroglioni e… mezzo: The Series!	2010	Gina	Canale 5	3 episodes
Caldo Criminale	2010	Anna Tardelli	Canale 5	Television movie
Né con te né senza di te	2012	Francesca "Capitana" Sipicciani	Rai 1	Miniseries
Baciamo le mani – Palermo New York 1958	2013	Gabriella Vitaliano	Canale 5	Miniseries
Amici di Maria De Filippi	2013–2016, 2019, 2022	Herself / Judge	Canale 5	Talent show (seasons 12–15, 18, 21)
Contratto	2014–2015	Herself / Host	Agon Channel	Talk show
House Party	2016	Herself / Guest host	Canale 5	Variety show (episode 1)
Rimbochiamoci le maniche	2016	Angela Tusco	Canale 5	8 episodes
Storie del genere	2018	Herself / Host	Rai 3	Talk show
L'amore strappato	2019	Rosa Macaluso	Canale 5	Miniseries
Tú sí que vales	2019–present	Herself / Popular judge	Canale 5	Talent show (seasons 6–present)
Amici Speciali	2020	Herself / Judge	Canale 5	Spin-off of Amici di Maria De Filippi
Svegliati amore mio	2021	Nanà Santoro	Canale 5	Miniseries
Dinner Club	2021	Herself	Prime Video	Docuseries
Sanremo Music Festival 2022	2022	Herself / Co-host	Rai 1	Annual music festival
Cars on the Road	2022	Sally Carrera (voice)	Disney+	9 episodes
Gloria	2024	Gloria Grandi	Rai 1	6 episodes
A testa alta	2026	Virginia Terzi	Canale 5	Miniseries

=== Stage ===
Title	Year	Role(s)	Theatre
Alleluja brava gente	1994–1995	Belcore	Teatro Sistina
Un paio d'ali	1997	Sgargamella	Teatro Sistina
Rugantino	1998–2001	Rosetta	Teatro Sistina

== Awards and nominations ==
Award	Year	Category	Nominated work	Result
Ciak d'Oro	1994	Best Supporting Actress	Law of Courage	Nominated
Ciak d'Oro	1995	Best Actress	Living It Up	Won
Ciak d'Oro	2008	Best Supporting Actress	Your Whole Life Ahead of You	Won
Ciak d'Oro	2014	Best Supporting Actress	The Great Beauty	Won
Ciak d'Oro	2016	Best Actress	Me, Myself and Her	Nominated
Ciak d'Oro	2016	Comedy Actress of the Year	Me, Myself and Her	Won
David di Donatello	1995	Best Actress	Living It Up	Nominated
David di Donatello	2009	Best Supporting Actress	Your Whole Life Ahead of You	Nominated
David di Donatello	2014	Best Actress	The Great Beauty	Nominated
David di Donatello	2016	Best Actress	Me, Myself and Her	Nominated
David di Donatello	2022	Prize "Donatello Speciale"	Herself	Won
Flaiano Prizes	1997	Best Performance in a TV Movie or Miniseries	Il padre di mia figlia	Won
Flaiano Prizes	2001	Best Performance in a TV Movie or Miniseries	Almost America	Won
Flaiano Prizes	2005	Best Performance in a TV Movie or Miniseries	Dalida	Won
Globo d'Oro	2008	Best Actress	Your Whole Life Ahead of You	Won
Nastro d'Argento	1993	Best Supporting Actress	Donne sottotetto	Nominated
Nastro d'Argento	1995	Best Actress	Living It Up	Won
Nastro d'Argento	1997	Best Actress	August Vacation	Nominated
Nastro d'Argento	2008	Best Supporting Actress	Your Whole Life Ahead of You	Won
Nastro d'Argento	2013	Best Supporting Actress	The Great Beauty	Won
Nastro d'Argento	2014	Prize "Nastro Speciale"	The Great Beauty	Won
Nastro d'Argento	2016	Best Actress	Me, Myself and Her	Nominated
Nastro d'Argento	2016	Best Movie with a Social Theme	Me, Myself and Her	Won
Nastro d'Argento	2017	Best Supporting Actress	Omicidio all'italiana	Nominated
Nastro d'Argento	2018	Best Supporting Actress	The Place	Nominated
Sacher Prize	1995	Best Actress	August Vacation	Won
Telegrolla Prize	2001	Best TV Actress	Almost America	Won
Telegrolla Prize	2004	Best TV Actress	Al di là delle frontiere	Won
Venice Film Festival	1993	Prize "Panorama"	Living It Up	Won
Venice Film Festival	2013	Prize "Kinéo"	The Great Beauty	Won
Vittorio De Sica Prize	2004	Best Actress	L'acqua… e il fuoco	Nominated
