= My Name Is Tanino =

- Directed by: Paolo Virzì
- Written by: Francesco Bruni; Francesco Piccolo; Paolo Virzì
- Produced by: Vittorio Cecchi Gori; Giovanni Lovatelli
- Starring: Corrado Fortuna; Rachel McAdams
- Cinematography: Arnaldo Catinari
- Edited by: Jacopo Quadri
- Music by: Carlo Virzì
- Production companies: Cecchi Gori Group; Whizbang Films Inc.
- Distributed by: Medusa Film
- Release date: 5 July 2002 (Venice Film Festival)
- Running time: 124 minutes
- Countries: Italy; Canada
- Languages: Italian, English
- Box office: €1,044,026 (Italy)

My Name Is Tanino is a 2002 comedy film directed by Paolo Virzì. The picaresque plot is about Tanino, an Italian liberal arts student who falls in love with a young American tourist he meets in Sicily and decides to track her down in the United States.

== Plot ==
Gaetano Mendolìa, nicknamed Tanino, is a native of the fictional Castelluzzo del Golfo, a small seaside resort in the province of Trapani, Sicily. He studies cinematography in Rome and dreams of becoming a movie director.

He meets Sally, an American girl vacationing in Italy, with whom he has a brief romance. At the end of her vacation, Sally returns to the fictional Seaport, Rhode Island, but forgets her camera in Italy. Tanino decides to travel to the US under the pretext of returning Sally's camera to her but in addition to avoiding Italian military service, which was mandatory at the time of the film. He leaves at night without telling anyone.

After arriving in America, Tanino has a series of adventures with the somewhat shady Li Causi family, Italian-Americans living in the US. Eventually, he leaves them and finally meets up with Sally and her "perfect" White Anglo-Saxon Protestant family, confounding them with his antics.

Later, Tanino escapes the clutches of the FBI by riding on the roof of a train and arrives in New York City where he meets his idol, director Seymour Chinawsky. However, Chinawsky is reduced to poverty and dies soon after promising to make a film with Tanino.

Despite Tanino's many misadventures, he always comes out on top because of his ingenuity.

== Cast ==
- Corrado Fortuna: Tanino Mendolia
- Rachel McAdams: Sally Garfield
- Frank Crudele: Angelo Maria Li Causi
- Licinia Lentini: Marinella, mother of Tanino
- Mary Long: Santa Li Causi
- Beau Starr: Omobono
- Jessica De Marco: Angelina
- Lori Hallier: Leslie Garfield
- Barry Flatman: Mr. Garfield
- Don Francks: Chinawsky
- Danielle Bouffard: Jane Garfield
- Meredith Ostrom: Melissa
- Genio Carbone: Rosario
- Marco Erler: Carmelo, sodale di Rosario

== See also ==
- List of Italian films of 2002
