= Red American =

Italian comedy-drama film (1991)

- Directed by: Alessandro D'Alatri
- Written by: Enzo Monteleone
- Produced by: Alessandro Parenzo
- Starring: Burt Young; Fabrizio Bentivoglio
- Cinematography: Alessio Gelsini Torresi
- Edited by: Cecilia Zanuso
- Music by: Gabriele Ducros
- Production companies: Videa; RAI Tre
- Distributed by: Warner Bros. Italia
- Release date: 1991
- Language: Italian

Red American (Italian: Americano rosso) is a 1991 Italian comedy-drama film. It was the directorial debut of Alessandro D'Alatri, who was awarded the David di Donatello Award for Best New Director for his work on the film.

The film also won the Globo d'oro, the Grolla d'oro and the Ciak d'oro for the cinematography by Alessio Gelsini Torresi, as well as the Ciak d'oro for best first work.

== Cast ==
- Burt Young as George Maniago
- Fabrizio Bentivoglio as Vittorio Benvegnù
- Valeria Milillo as Antonietta
- Massimo Ghini as Questore Santesso
- Sabrina Ferilli as Zaira
- Tullia Alborghetti as Elvira
- Beatrice Palme as Adey
- Pino Ammendola as cavalier Gervasutti
- Eros Pagni as Oscar Benvegnù
- Miranda Martino as Nella Dalpoz

== See also ==
- List of Italian films of 1991
