= Francesco Bruni (screenwriter) =

Italian screenwriter and director

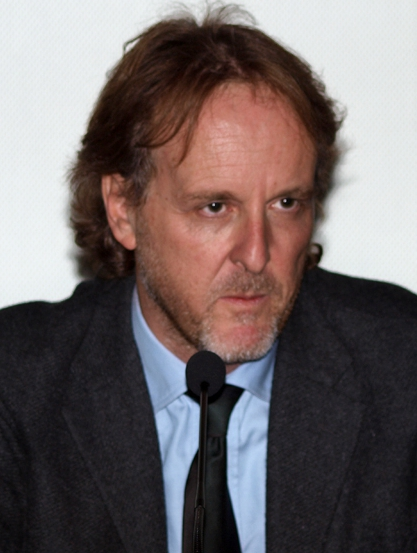
- Bruni in 2011
- Born: 30 September 1961 (age 64); Rome, Italy
- Occupation(s): Screenwriter; Director

Francesco Bruni (born 30 September 1961) is an Italian screenwriter and director.

== Life and career ==
Born in Rome, Bruni started his professional career as a screenwriter in 1991, for the film Condominio. In 1994, he started a long collaboration with director Paolo Virzì with Virzì's debut film Living It Up.

In 2011, Bruni made his directorial debut with Easy!, which got him the David di Donatello for Best New Director as well as the Nastro d'Argento in the same category.

His 2020 feature Everything's Gonna Be Alright brought him Premio Flaiano for Best Director.

== Personal life ==
Bruni teaches screenwriting at the Centro Sperimentale di Cinematografia in Rome. He is the father of rapper and singer Side Baby.

== Selected filmography ==
- Living It Up (1994)
- August Vacation (1995)
- The Second Time (1995)
- Ovosodo (1997)
- Notes of Love (1998)
- Kisses and Hugs (1999)
- I Prefer the Sound of the Sea (2000)
- The Words of My Father (2001)
- My Name Is Tanino (2002)
- Nati stanchi (2002)
- Happiness Costs Nothing (2003)
- Caterina in the Big City (2003)
- Napoleon and Me (2006)
- Il 7 e l'8 (2007)
- I Vicerè (2007)
- Your Whole Life Ahead of You (2008)
- La matassa (2009)
- The First Beautiful Thing (2010)
- Marriage and Other Disasters (2010)
- It May Be Love But It Doesn't Show (2011)
- Easy! (2011, also director)
- Every Blessed Day (2012)
- Human Capital (2013)
- Studio illegale (2013)
- Noi 4 (2014, also director)
- Slam (2016)
- Friends by Chance (2017, also director)
- Everything's Gonna Be Alright (2020, also director)
- Everything Calls For Salvation (2022 television series, also director)
- Another Summer Holiday (2024)
