= Maria Sole Tognazzi =

Italian film director (born 1971)

- Born: 2 May 1971 (age 55); Rome, Italy
- Occupation: Film director
- Years active: 1997–present
- Parents: Ugo Tognazzi (father); Franca Bettoia (mother)
- Relatives: Gianmarco Tognazzi (brother); Ricky Tognazzi (half-brother); Thomas Robsahm (half-brother)

Maria Sole Tognazzi (born 2 May 1971) is an Italian film director.

== Biography ==
She is the daughter of actor and director Ugo Tognazzi and actress Franca Bettoia. She has a brother, actor Gianmarco, and two half-brothers, actor and director Ricky Tognazzi and film director and producer Thomas Robsahm.

Following years as an apprentice director, she made her directorial debut with the 1997 live action short film Non finisce qui. This was followed by two more short films, C'ero anch'io (1999) and Sempre a tempo (2000). Her first feature-length film was Past Perfect (Italian: Passato prossimo, 2003), for which she also co-wrote the screenplay with Daniele Prato and for which the Italian National Syndicate of Film Journalists awarded her the 2003 Nastro d'Argento for Best New Director. It was also entered into the 25th Moscow International Film Festival.

Her second feature film, The Man Who Loves (Italian: L'uomo che ama, 2008), was written with Ivan Cotroneo and filmed at Lake Orta and Turin. The cast included Pierfrancesco Favino and Monica Bellucci. In 2010, her documentary Ritratto di mio padre (Portrait of My Father) was screened at the Rome Film Festival. Her third feature film, A Five Star Life (Italian: Viaggio sola, 2013), starring Margherita Buy, was written with Ivan Cotroneo and Francesca Marciano. Me, Myself and Her is the first feature-length Italian romantic comedy about a lesbian relationship.

== Filmography ==
- Past Perfect (2003)
- The Man Who Loves (2008)
- A Five Star Life (2013)
- Me, Myself and Her (2015)
- Petra (2020, Italian TV series)

== See also ==
- List of female film and television directors
- List of LGBT-related films directed by women
