= Alice Teghil =

Italian film actress (born 1989)

Alice Teghil (born 23 January 1989 in Rome) is an Italian film actress. She starred as Caterina in the 2003 Italian teen drama Caterina in the Big City which appeared at the Sundance Film Festival.
