= Ovosodo =

- Directed by: Paolo Virzì
- Written by: Paolo Virzì; Francesco Bruni
- Produced by: Rita Rusić; Vittorio Cecchi Gori
- Starring: Edoardo Gabbriellini; Claudia Pandolfi; Nicoletta Braschi
- Cinematography: Italo Petriccione
- Edited by: Jacopo Quadri
- Music by: Battista Lena
- Release date: September 3, 1997
- Running time: 100 minutes
- Language: Italian

Ovosodo (named after a quarter in the historic center of Livorno, the city where the story takes place), also known as Hardboiled Egg, is a 1997 Italian comedy film, co-written and directed by Paolo Virzì.

== Cast ==
- Edoardo Gabbriellini: Piero Mansani
- Nicoletta Braschi: prof. Giovanna Fornari
- Claudia Pandolfi: Susy Susini
- Marco Cocci: Tommaso Paladini
- Regina Orioli: Lisa
- Barbara Scoppa: mother of Piero
- Paolo Ruffini: Gargani

== See also ==
- List of Italian films of 1997
