= Massimo Ghini =

Italian film actor

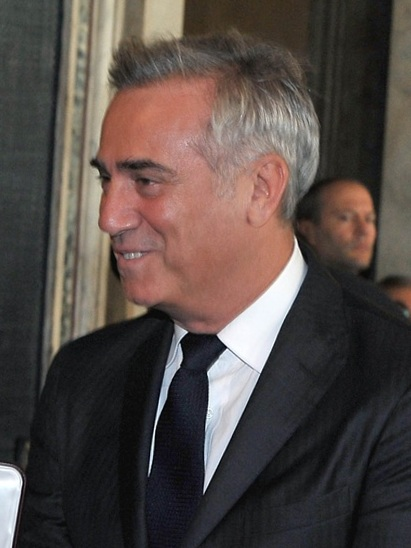
- Ghini in 2011
- Born: 12 October 1954 (age 72); Rome, Italy
- Occupation: Actor
- Height: 1.78 m (5 ft 10 in)

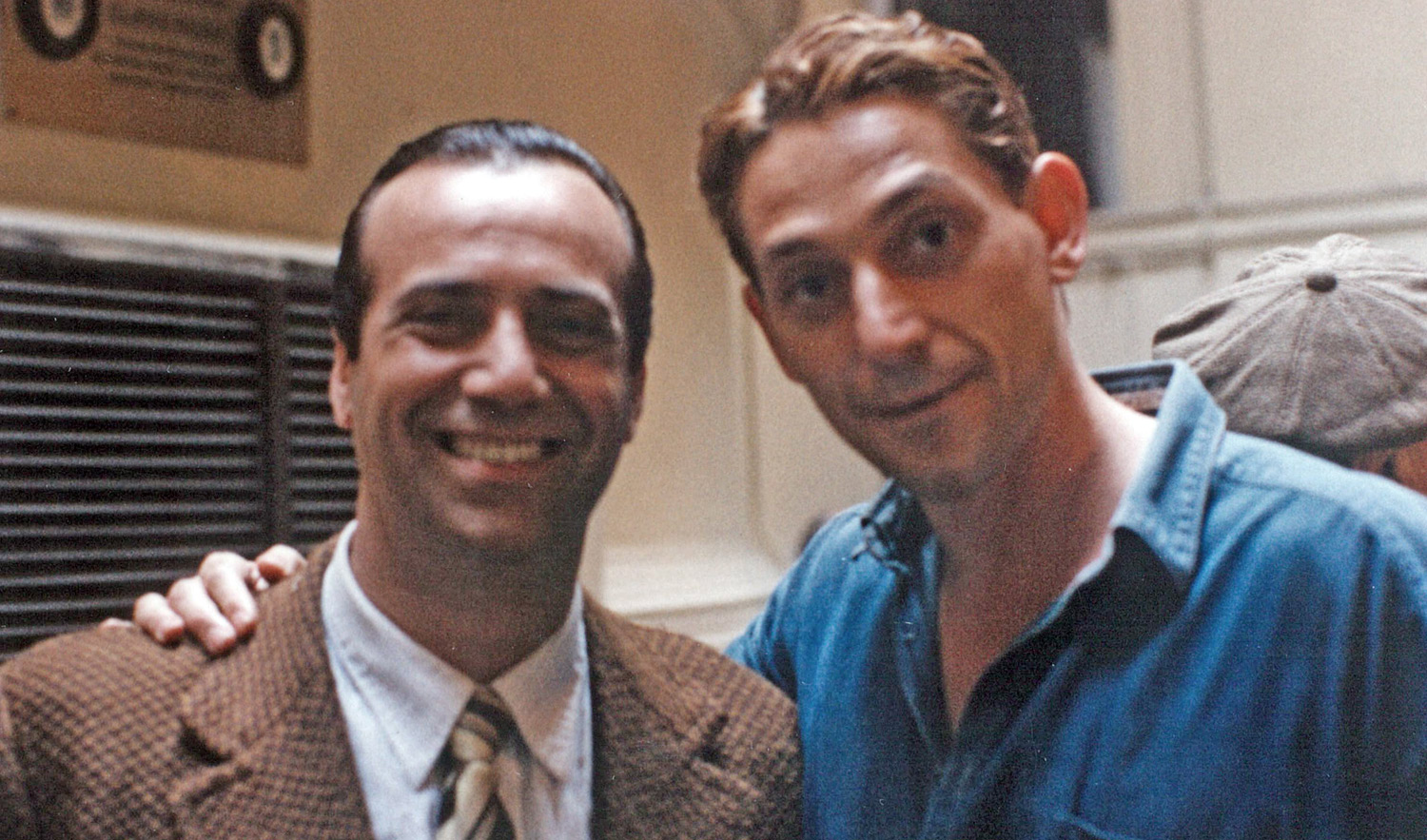
Massimo Ghini (left) on the set of Celluloide, Rome, Italy 1996

Massimo Ghini (born 12 October 1954) is an Italian actor.

== Life ==
He has worked with Franco Zeffirelli, Giorgio Strehler, Giuseppe Patroni Griffi, and Gabriele Lavia, among others.

He has been married to actress Nancy Brilli, and is the father of four children.

== Selected filmography ==
=== Film ===
- Speed Cross (1980)
- La neve nel bicchiere (1984)
- Secrets Secrets (1984)
- Lethal Obsession (1987)
- Compagni di scuola (1988)
- Italia-Germania 4-3 (1990)
- The Battle of the Three Kings (1990)
- Red American (1991)
- The Party's Over (1991)
- A Simple Story (1991)
- Living It Up (1994)
- The True Life of Antonio H. (1994)
- Men Men Men (1995)
- State Secret (1995)
- Celluloide (1996)
- Follow Your Heart (1996)
- The Truce (1997)
- The Game Bag (1997)
- Tea with Mussolini (1999)
- CQ (2001)
- Almost America (2001)
- John XXIII: The Pope of Peace (2002)
- Imperium: Augustus (2003)
- Floor 17 (2005)
- Natale a Miami (2005)
- Natale a New York (2006)
- Tutta la vita davanti (2008)
- Natale a Rio (2008)
- Natale a Beverly Hills (2009)
- Natale in Sudafrica (2010)
- Amici miei – Come tutto ebbe inizio (2011)
- Vacanze ai Caraibi (2015)
- Non si ruba a casa dei ladri (2016)
- There's No Place Like Home (2018)
- L'agenzia dei bugiardi (2019)
- De sable et de feu (2019)
- Vivere (2019)
- La mia banda suona il pop (2020)
- Help! My In-Laws Are Vampires! (2021)
- A Freaking Wedding! (2023)

=== Television ===
- Raccontami (2006 - 2008)
- Titanic: Blood and Steel (2012)
- The New Pope (2020)
- Hotel Costiera (2025)
