= August Vacation =

- Directed by: Paolo Virzì
- Written by: Paolo Virzì; Francesco Bruni
- Produced by: Vittorio Cecchi Gori; Rita Rusic
- Starring: Silvio Orlando; Sabrina Ferilli; Ennio Fantastichini; Laura Morante
- Cinematography: Paolo Carnera
- Edited by: Cecilia Zanuso
- Music by: Battista Lena
- Release date: April 5, 1996
- Running time: 106 minutes
- Language: Italian

August Vacation (Italian: Ferie d'agosto, also known as Summer Holidays) is a 1996 Italian comedy drama film directed by Paolo Virzì.

The film was awarded with the David di Donatello for Best Film.

== Plot ==
On the small island of Ventotene, two groups of people spend their vacation in two adjoining houses. One group is led by the journalist and self-proclaimed intellectual Sandro Molino and his partner Cecilia Sarcoli. The other group is led by Ruggero Mazzalupi, a wealthy owner of two armories, a typical representative of the "Roman generone" (the wealthy, old-money class of Rome).

The first group includes: Mauro, an actor and Cecilia's ex-partner; their young daughter Martina; Francesca, Mauro's friend who was once Sandro's partner; Betta and Graziella, friends of Cecilia; Ivan, Graziella's son; and finally, Roberto, a curious character and Latin lover who roams between Africa and Cuba and other exotic places, claiming to have "official" assignments.

In the second group, besides Ruggero, are: his wife Luciana; their two children: the teenage Sabrina and their younger son; Ruggero's elderly, senile mother; Luciana's sister, the beautiful and provocative Marisa, who Ruggero has always been in love with; Marcello, Marisa's husband, a former nightclub singer now running a perfume shop, who owes Ruggero 50 million lira; and their only son. Ruggero secretly despises Marcello but pretends to be magnanimous, continuously postponing discussions about the debt in order to keep his brother-in-law psychologically submissive and to pressure Marisa to leave her husband.

The relations between the two groups of tourists are immediately conflictual. Sandro's group cannot stand the noisy, superficial, and arrogant behavior of the neighbors but, at the same time, treats their attempts at friendship with snobbery, condescension, and barely concealed mockery.

Unfortunately, an immigrant is injured by a bullet fired as part of a foolish prank by Ruggero, who is then called to account by the Carabinieri after Sandro files a report. Admitting that he committed a reckless and harmful act, and seeking to make amends with Sandro and his group, Ruggero organizes a kind of nighttime assembly. The occasion leads to accusations and interventions on different levels, including political ones.

Amid accusations and defenses, but essentially in a general and confused disorientation, everything unravels into a jumble of arguments quickly flattened and inert. Under the stars, it seems that each person has succumbed not so much to political motivations and passions, but rather to their personal feelings and issues.

At the end of the summer vacation, Cecilia confesses to Sandro that she is eight weeks pregnant with his child. Sandro is happy and assures her that he will love the child as he loves Martina. Mauro, realizing he cannot win Cecilia back, gets drunk at the village festival, falls, and hits his head. He is helped and hosted by a local family who takes a liking to him, and their beautiful daughter is infatuated with him. Francesca, realizing she cannot win Sandro back, befriends Marcello, who feels misunderstood by his wife and is having a crisis. Roberto, after a night of secret passion with Marisa, abandons her and leaves for Africa. Ruggero witnesses Marisa's betrayal and prevents his daughter Sabrina, who has fallen in love with Ivan (unrequited), from committing suicide. These two experiences bring him closer to his wife Luciana, who had long suffered from her husband's emotional distance.

The immigrant, following the report filed by Sandro and the ensuing media uproar about principle, becomes the subject of attention by law enforcement and is eventually expelled from the island for not being in compliance with regulations.

At the end of the film, most of the characters leave the island to return home. The only one left on the dock, crying but hopeful, shouting "I love you" toward the ferry on which Ivan has boarded, is Sabrina.

== Cast ==
- Silvio Orlando: Sandro Molino
- Laura Morante: Cecilia Sarcoli
- Ennio Fantastichini: Ruggero Mazzalupi
- Paola Tiziana Cruciani: Luciana
- Sabrina Ferilli: Marisa
- Piero Natoli: Marcello
- Agnese Claisse: Martina
- Rocco Papaleo: Brigadiere
- Silvio Vannucci: Mauro Santucci
- Antonella Ponziani: Francesca
- Teresa Saponangelo: Irene Vitiello
- Gigio Alberti: Roberto

== See also ==
- List of Italian films of 1996
