= Felipe ha gli occhi azzurri =

- Country of origin: Italy
- Original language: Italian
- No. of seasons: 2
- No. of episodes: 5

Original release
- Network: Rai Uno
- Release: 1991 – 1993

Felipe ha gli occhi azzurri is an Italian television series.

== See also ==
- List of Italian television series
