= Felice Farina =

Italian director (1954–2023)

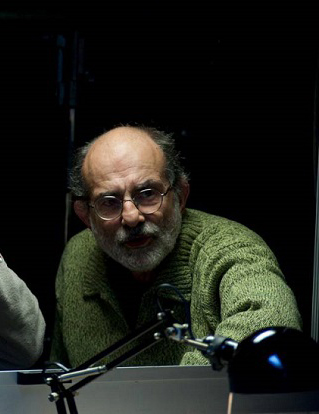
- Farina in 2014
- Born: 14 August 1954; Rome, Italy
- Died: 18 September 2023 (aged 69); Rome, Italy
- Occupation: director
- Years active: 1986–2023

Felice Farina (14 August 1954 – 18 September 2023) was an Italian director and screenwriter.

== Biography ==
Felice Farina was a Rome-based artist. He grew through the ferment of Roman avant-garde theatre, both as an actor and backstage, developing – at the same time – a strong interest in animation and special/optical effects for filmmaking.

From 1980 he experimented with filmmaking riding the transition from traditional to digital imaging, producing several works mixing analogical and numerical techniques in film and multivision. In the same years, he started applying elements of technical and industrial design to the field of arts, focusing on the relation between art and science and collaborating on several projects of kinetic and scientific art.

As a film director he directed several documentaries and three short movies before making his first feature film Sembra morto ma... è solo svenuto in 1986, written with Gianni Di Gregorio and Sergio Castellitto, who is also the protagonist. He spent many years directing motion pictures, developing a great interest both in film drama research and in the new expressive challenges coming from compositing images and sound in the new multi-layer virtual environments. His film Bidoni (1995) was the first Italian movie edited in Avid environment.

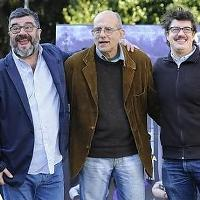
Felice Farina and cast members Francesco Pannofino and Carlo Gabardini at Venice Film Festival 2014 with Patria

His last work Patria (2014) was inspired by Enrico Deaglio's bestseller Patria 1978–2008 (2009) and was selected in Venice Film Festival Authors Days.

Farina was known to build most of his own movie equipment. He was also skilled in Arduino programming.

Felice Farina died on 18 September 2023, at the age of 69.

== Filmography ==
=== Movies ===
- Sembra morto... ma è solo svenuto (1986)
- Affetti speciali (also screenwriter, 1987)
- Sposi (co-director, 1988)
- Affetti speciali (also screenwriter, 1989)
- Condominio (1991)
- Ultimo respiro (1992)
- Bidoni (also screenwriter, 1995)
- Senza freni (also screenwriter, 2003)
- La fisica dell'acqua (also screenwriter, 2010)
- Patria (also screenwriter and producer, 2014)

=== TV ===
- Stazione di servizio (Rai-1989)
- Felipe ha gli occhi azzurri (Rai-1991)
- Il caso Bozano (Rai-1996)
- Scardabà (Rai-1998)
- Nebbia in Val Padana (Rai-2000)

=== Documentaries ===
- The Trasimeno Lake, TV
- Matera, TV
- The tratturo, TV
- The Snakes of Cocullo, TV
- Santa Gemma, TV
- The Vesuvius, TV

=== Art works ===
- Respiro (Breath), mechanical sculpture (with Gregorio Botta, 2008) Mart, Rovereto, 2010

== Awards ==
- Annecy Italian Film Festival (1986)
  - Menzione Speciale della Giuria per Sembra morto... ma è solo svenuto (1986)
- Annecy Italian Film Festival (1987)
  - Menzione Speciale della Giuria per Affetti speciali (1986)
- Annecy Italian Film Festival (1992)
  - Gran Prix per Condominio (1991)
  - Premio del Pubblico per Condominio (1991)
- Venice Film Festival (1995)
  - Ciak d'Oro (special prize) per Bidoni (1995)
- Mostra internazionale del Nuovo Cinema di Pesaro (2009)
  - Premio del Pubblico per La fisica dell'acqua (2009)
- Busto Arsizio Film Festival (2010)
  - Miglior Regista per La fisica dell'acqua (2010)
