= Your Whole Life Ahead of You =

- Theatrical release poster
- Directed by: Paolo Virzì
- Written by: Paolo Virzì; Francesco Bruni
- Produced by: Paolo Virzì; Guido Simonetti
- Starring: Isabella Ragonese; Massimo Ghini; Valerio Mastandrea; Micaela Ramazzotti; Elio Germano; Sabrina Ferilli
- Distributed by: Medusa Film
- Release date: 28 March 2008
- Running time: 117 minutes
- Country: Italy
- Language: Italian

Your Whole Life Ahead of You (Italian: Tutta la vita davanti) is a 2008 Italian comedy-drama film directed by Paolo Virzì and written by Virzì and Francesco Bruni.

== Plot ==
The events of a freshly graduated young woman in the universe of precarious work.

== Cast ==
- Isabella Ragonese — Marta
- Sabrina Ferilli — Daniela
- Massimo Ghini — Claudio
- Valerio Mastandrea — Giorgio
- Elio Germano — Lucio
- Micaela Ramazzotti — Sonia
- Valentina Carnelutti — Maria Chiara
- Caterina Guzzanti — Fabiana Lanza Campitelli
- Laura Morante - voce narrante (voice)
- Giulia Salerno - Lara
- Edoardo Gabbriellini - Roberto
