= Condominio =

- Directed by: Felice Farina
- Written by: Felice Farina; Paolo Virzì
- Starring: Carlo Delle Piane
- Cinematography: Carlo Cerchio
- Music by: Lamberto Macchi
- Release date: 1991
- Country: Italy
- Language: Italian

Condominio (Apartment Block) is a 1991 Italian comedy drama film directed by Felice Farina.

For his performance Ciccio Ingrassia won the David di Donatello for best supporting actor.

== Cast ==
- Carlo Delle Piane: Michele Marrone
- Leda Lojodice: Irene Marrone
- Ottavia Piccolo: Adelaide
- Ciccio Ingrassia: Mar. Gaetano Scarfi
- Anna Lelio: Rosetta Scarfi
- Roberto Citran: Roberto Sgorlon
