= Francesco Piccolo =

Italian novelist and screenwriter

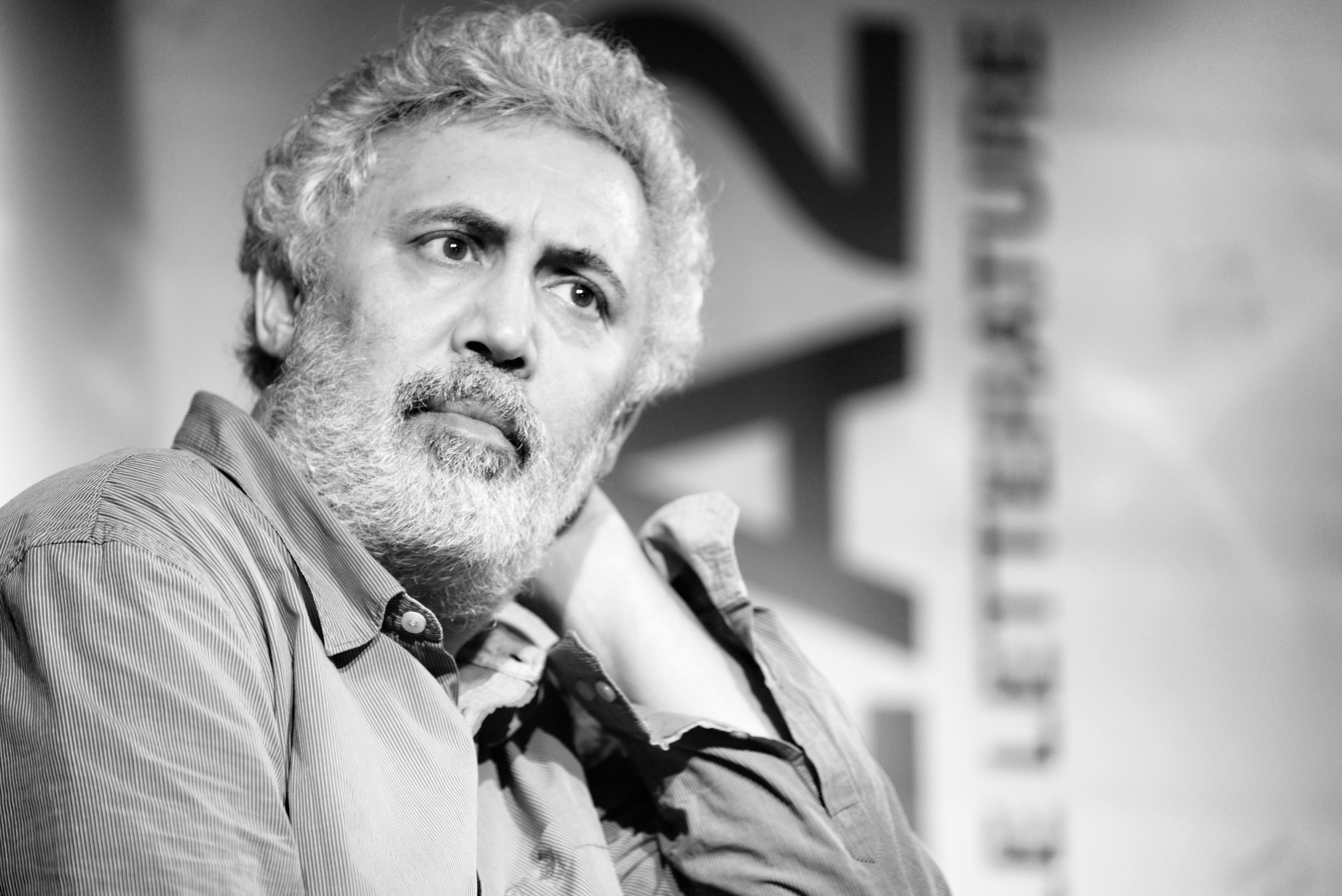
Francesco Piccolo

Francesco Piccolo (born 1964) is an Italian author of novels, short stories and screenplays. In 2014, he won Italy's leading literary award the Premio Strega for Il desiderio di essere come tutti.

== Life and career ==
Piccolo was born in Caserta. His novels and short story collections include Allegro occidentale, E se c'ero dormivo, Il tempo imperfetto, and Storie di primogeniti e figli unici (all published by Feltrinelli); l'Italia spensierata (Laterza); Momenti di trascurabile felicità and La separazione del maschio (Einaudi). With Storie di primogeniti e figli unici he won two literary prizes: the Premio Giuseppe Berto and the Premio letterario Piero Chiara.

In the cinema he has worked on screenplays for My Name Is Tanino, Paz! (based on cartoons by Andrea Pazienza), Ovunque sei, Il caimano (for which he, Nanni Moretti and Federica Pontremoli were awarded the 2006 David di Donatello for Best Script), Nemmeno in un sogno, Caos calmo (in which he also made an appearance) and Giorni e nuvole.

He has also written for newspapers and periodicals, including la Repubblica and Diario. Piccolo lives in Rome, where he runs the screenwriters laboratory for the DAMS course at Roma Tre.
