= Dario Cantarelli =

Italian actor (born 1945)

- Born: 16 September 1945 (age 80); Isola Dovarese, Italy
- Occupation: Actor
- Years active: 1973–present

Dario Cantarelli (born 16 September 1945) is an Italian actor.

== Biography ==
He began his acting career on stage in 1973 with Carlo Cecchi's Granteatro company, playing roles in plays by William Shakespeare (Antony and Cleopatra), Eduardo De Filippo (Filumena Marturano), Molière, Luigi Pirandello, Harold Pinter and Bertolt Brecht. During those same years, he began acting in movies, directed by filmmakers such as Nanni Moretti, Marco Bellocchio, Paolo Sorrentino and the Taviani brothers.

He also works with the Ater company in Alexandr Vasiljevič Suchovo-Kobylin's The Vampire of St. Petersburg and Italo Svevo's La burla riuscita. Later, with Valeria Moriconi's company, he took part in Eduardo De Filippo's Filumena Marturano, Hugo von Hofmannsthal's The Knight of the Rose, William Shakespeare's Antony and Cleopatra, Victorien Sardou and Émile Moreau's Madame Sans-Gêne, Thomas Bernhard's Alla meta, and Aldo Palazzeschi's Interrogatorio della contessa Maria.

He flanked his career as a theater actor, with a film career, working with directors such as Marco Bellocchio, Nanni Moretti, Daniele Luchetti, Paolo and Vittorio Taviani, Pupi Avati and Paolo Sorrentino. He also worked for television taking part in the series Un commissario a Roma with Nino Manfredi.

== Filmography ==
Year	Title	Role	Notes
1976	Victory March		
1981	Sweet Dreams	Critic	
1982	The Night of the Shooting Stars	Priest	
1984	Sweet Body of Bianca	Dean	
1984	Softly, Softly		
1985	The Mass Is Ended	Gianni	
1988	It's Happening Tomorrow	Abbé Flambert	
1991	The Yes Man	Carissimi	
1995	L'assassino è quello con le scarpe gialle	Otto	
1997	The Best Man	Edgardo Osti	
1998	You Laugh	Dottore	(segment "Felice")
2001	The Son's Room	Patient	
2006	The Caiman	Critico gastronomico	
2007	The Right Distance	Tiresia	
2011	We Have a Pope	Attore	
2013	The Great Beauty	Assistante Santa	
2016	Children of the Night		
2017	Metti una notte	Renato	
2018	The Invisible Boy - Second Generation	Morfeo	
2018	Loro	Paolo Spagnolo	
2022	Marcel!	The suitor	

== Television ==
- A commissioner in Rome - TV series (1993)
- Linda and the brigadier - TV series, one episode (2000)
- I am Gaetano, directed by Rolando Colla - TV movie (2016)
- 1993, by Giuseppe Gagliardi - TV series, episode 2x01 (2017)
