= 43th David di Donatello =

1998 Italian film awards

43rd David di Donatello
- Date: 5 July 1998
- Site: Teatro delle Vittorie, Rome
- Hosted by: Milly Carlucci

Highlights
- Best Picture: Life Is Beautiful
- Most awards: Life Is Beautiful (8)
- Most nominations: Life Is Beautiful (12)

Television coverage
- Network: Rai 1

The 43th David di Donatello ceremony, presented by the Accademia del Cinema Italiano, was held on 5 July 1998.

== Winners and nominees ==
Best Film: Life Is Beautiful, directed by Roberto Benigni; Ovosodo, directed by Paolo Virzì; April, directed by Nanni Moretti	Best Producer: Elda Ferri, Gianluigi Braschi – Life Is Beautiful; Donatella Palermo, Loes Kamsteeg – To Die for Tano; Marco Risi, Maurizio Tedesco – Kaputt Mundi
Best Director: Roberto Benigni – Life Is Beautiful; Mario Martone – Rehearsals for War; Paolo Virzì – Ovosodo	Best New Director: Roberta Torre – To Die for Tano; Riccardo Milani – Auguri professore; Aldo, Giovanni e Giacomo e Massimo Venier – Three Men and a Leg
Best Actor: Roberto Benigni – Life Is Beautiful; Nanni Moretti – April; Silvio Orlando – Auguri professore	Best Actress: Valeria Bruni Tedeschi – Notes of Love; Anna Bonaiuto – Rehearsals for War; Valeria Golino – The Acrobats
Best Supporting Actor: Silvio Orlando – April; Sergio Bustric – Life Is Beautiful; Massimo Ceccherini – Fireworks	Best Supporting Actress: Nicoletta Braschi – Ovosodo; Athina Cenci – My Dearest Friends; Marina Confalone – Notes of Love
David di Donatello for Best Screenplay: Vincenzo Cerami, Roberto Benigni – Life Is Beautiful; Mimmo Calopresti – Notes of Love; Paolo Virzì – Ovosodo	Best Cinematography: Tonino Delli Colli – Life Is Beautiful; Luca Bigazzi – The Acrobats; Pasquale Mari – Rehearsals for War
Best Production Design: Danilo Donati – Life Is Beautiful; Alberto Cottignoli, Stefano Tonelli – The Best Man; Luciano Ricceri – Kaputt Mundi	Best Score: Nino D'Angelo – To Die for Tano; Franco Piersanti – Notes of Love; Nicola Piovani – Life Is Beautiful
Best Editing: Jacopo Quadri – Rehearsals for War; Simona Paggi – Life Is Beautiful; Jacopo Quadri – Ovosodo	Best Sound: Tullio Morganti – Ovosodo; Tullio Morganti – Life Is Beautiful; Alessandro Zanon – April
Best Costumes: Danilo Donati – Life Is Beautiful; Vittoria Guaita – The Best Man; Maurizio Millenotti – The Bride's Journey	Best Short Film: La matta dei fiori, directed by Rolando Stefanelli; Asino chi legge, directed by Pietro Reggiani; Spalle al muro, directed by Nina Di Majo
Best Foreign Film: The Full Monty, directed by Peter Cattaneo; Amistad, directed by Steven Spielberg; The Thief, directed by Pavel Chukhray	David Scuola: Life Is Beautiful, directed by Roberto Benigni; Special David Awards: Tullio Pinelli
