= Augusto Minzolini =

Italian journalist and politician (born 1958)

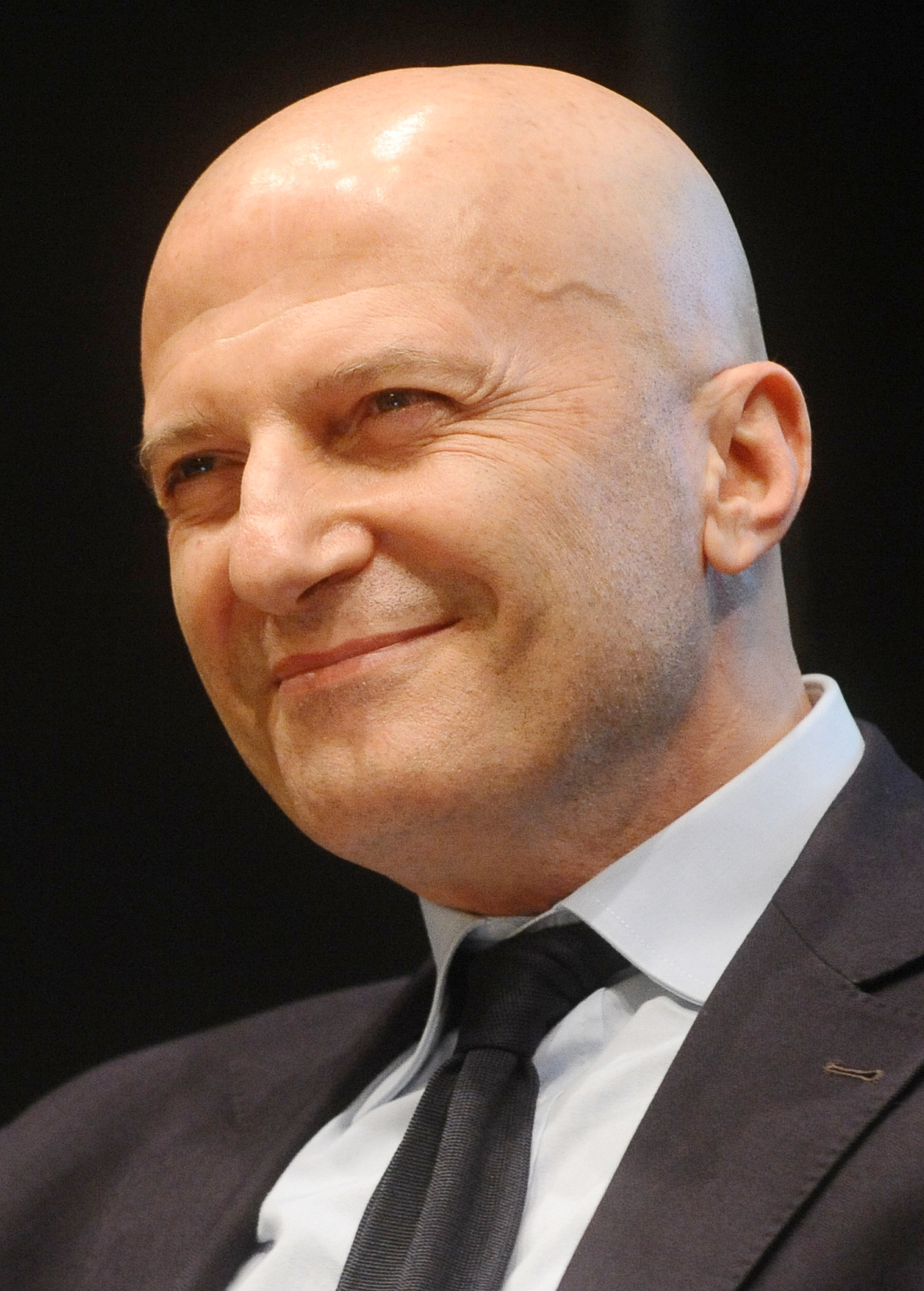

Member of the Senate of the Republic
- In office 15 March 2013 – 20 April 2017
- Constituency: Liguria

Personal details
- Born: 3 August 1958 (age 67) Rome, Italy
- Party: Forza Italia (2013–2017); PdL (2013)
- Height: 1.75 m (5 ft 9 in)
- Profession: Politician, journalist

Augusto Minzolini (born 3 August 1958) is an Italian journalist and politician.

== Biography ==
Augusto Minzolini was born on 3 August 1958 in Rome. During the 1970s, he participated as an appearance in two movies by Nanni Moretti, I Am Self Sufficient (1976) and Ecce bombo (1978).

In 1977, he started working as a journalist and in 1980 he became a professional journalist. In the 1980s, he worked for the magazine Panorama, while in 1990 he began to work for La Stampa.

On 20 May 2009, he was appointed director of TG1 by the majority of the Board of Directors of Rai, without the votes of three members of the centre-left, who had left the room, judging the appointment "inadmissible", but obtaining the favorable vote of Rai president Paolo Garimberti. Minzolini obtained the confidence of the majority of TG1 editors who voted for his editorial plan with 101 votes in favor and 40 against.

On 13 December 2011, Augusto Minzolini was removed from the TG1 direction and replaced by Alberto Maccari; on 15 February 2013 he asked for reinstatement to TG1 direction but in September 2013 this appeal was rejected by the labor court.

In 2013, Minzolini was elected Senator among the ranks of The People of Freedom. On 16 March 2017 the Senate voted against the forfeiture of Minzolini, indeed the senators approved the agenda of Forza Italia with 137 yes, 94 no and 20 abstentions, rejecting the decision of the Immunity Council, which in July 2016 had declared the former journalist lapsed as MP because he was convicted for abuse of office with a sentence res judicata. However, Minzolini presented his resignation as Senator on 28 March 2017, which was accepted by the Senate on 20 April 2017.
