= Insieme a te non ci sto più =

Single by Caterina Caselli

from the album Caterina Caselli
- B-side: "Il dolce volo"
- Released: 1968
- Genre: Pop
- Length: 2:48
- Label: CGD
- Songwriter(s): Paolo Conte, Michele Virano, Vito Pallavicini

Caterina Caselli singles chronology
"L'orologio" (1968)	"Insieme a te non ci sto più" (1968)	"Il carnevale" (1968)

"Insieme a te non ci sto più" (Italian pronunciation: [inˈsjɛːme a tˈte nnon tʃi ˌstɔ pˈpju]; i.e. "I will no longer be with you.") is an Italian pop song written by Paolo Conte, Michele Virano and Vito Pallavicini and performed by Caterina Caselli. Years later Conte revealed that he and Pallavicini auditioned many singers before giving the song to Caselli, as she was the only one who could deliver a strong enough performance.

The song peaked at the third place on the Italian hit parade. It was covered by several artists, including Ornella Vanoni, Franco Battiato, Rita Pavone, Giusy Ferreri, Gianna Nannini, Elisa, Claudio Baglioni, Alessandro Haber, Avion Travel. It was also included in the soundtrack of a number of films, notably Nanni Moretti's Sweet Body of Bianca and The Son's Room and Giovanni Veronesi's Manual of Love.

In 2006, Caselli recorded a new version of the song for the soundtrack of the Michele Soavi's neo-noir film The Goodbye Kiss. This version won the David di Donatello Award for Best Original Song.

== Track listing ==
- 7" single – AN 4155

A. "Insieme a te non ci sto più" (Paolo Conte, Michele Virano, Vito Pallavicini) – 2:48
B. "Il dolce volo" (Paolo Conte, Vito Pallavicini) – 2:45

== Charts ==
Chart (1966)	Peak position
Italy	3
