= Remo Remotti =

Italian actor, playwright, artist, and poet

- Born: 16 November 1924; Rome, Italy
- Died: 21 June 2015 (aged 90); Rome, Italy
- Occupations: Actor, playwright, artist
- Height: 1.73 m (5 ft 8 in)

Remo Remotti (16 November 1924 – 21 June 2015) was an Italian actor, playwright, artist and poet.

== Life and career ==
Born in Rome, Remotti lost his father at 12 years old. After graduating in Law, he moved to Peru, where he attended an art school and began painting. Following the bankruptcy of the taxi company he had founded in Peru, seven years later he returned to Italy where he married Maria Luisa Loy, the sister of the director and screenwriter Nanni Loy, and started an activity as a playwright, often also directing and acting his comedy plays. He was later requested by some theatrical companies for character roles, and in the late 1970s he began a proficuous film career as a character actor in films. A painter and a sculptor, some of his works are exhibited at the Galleria Nazionale d'Arte Moderna. He was also a composer of poems, usually sonnets in Roman dialect.

== Selected filmography ==
- A mosca cieca (1966)
- La prova generale (1968)
- Il gabbiano (1977)
- Morte di un operatore (1979)
- The Meadow (1979)
- La terrazza (1980)
- Henry Angst (1980)
- A Leap in the Dark (1980) - Thief
- Masoch (1980) - Grunwald
- The Lady of the Camellias (1981)
- Sweet Dreams (1981) - Sigmund Freud
- La festa perduta (1981)
- The Logic of Emotion (1982)
- Giocare d'azzardo (1982)
- Canto d'amore (1982)
- The Scarlet and the Black (1983) - Rabbi Leoni
- Occhei, occhei (1983)
- Where's Picone? (1984)
- Bianca (1984) - Siro Siri
- A Strange Passion (1984) - Peppo
- Liberté, Égalité, Choucroute (1985)
- Un foro nel parabrezza (1985) - Simic
- Juke box (1985)
- Inganni (1985)
- Otello (1986) - Brabantio
- Italian Night (1987) - Italo
- Helsinki Napoli All Night Long (1987) - Neapolitan
- Red Wood Pigeon (1989) - Alter ego of coach
- Nulla ci può fermare (1989)
- Lungo il fiume (1989)
- Affetti speciali (1989) - Venditore di patatine
- The Godfather Part III (1990) - Cardinal Sistine
- Stiamo attraversando un brutto periodo (1990)
- Con i piedi per aria (1990)
- To Want to Fly (1991) - The 'Child'
- Hudson Hawk (1991) - Guy on Donkey
- Ladri di futuro (1991)
- Derrick - Caprese in der Stadt (1991) - Caprese
- Miracolo italiano (1994)
- Il mondo alla rovescia (1995)
- Bits and Pieces (1996)
- Cuba Libre - Velocipedi ai tropici (1997) - Poet
- Simpatici & antipatici (1998) - Augusto
- Tobia al caffè (2000) - Colonnello
- Caruso, Zero for Conduct (2001) - Stefano
- Quore (2002)
- It Can't Be All Our Fault (2003) - Butler
- Household Accounts (2003) - Magistrato anziano
- Andata e ritorno (2003) - Capo di Samuele
- Red Riding Hood (2003) - Francesco Scura
- Agata and the Storm (2004) - Generoso Rambone
- Ladri di barzellette (2004)
- Sara May (2004) - Usciere Cinecittà
- La bambina dalle mani sporche (2005) - Notaio
- Nemici per la pelle (2006) - Satana
- Shooting Silvio (2006)
- Segretario particolare (2007) - Amico di Mattia
- Nero bifamiliare (2007) - Colonnello Piacentini
- La canarina assassinata (2008) - Director
- Il prossimo tuo (2008) - Bit part (uncredited)
- La strategia degli affetti (2009) - Goffredo
- Palestrina - Prince of Music (2009) - Filippo Neri
- Nine (2009) - Cardinal
- Letters to Juliet (2010) - Farm House Lorenzo
- Eat Pray Love (2010) - Older Soccer Fan
- The Santa Claus Gang (2010) - Barbone
- Escort in Love (2011) - Poeta
- Buona giornata (2012) - Vecchio funerale
- Viva l'Italia (2012) - Annibale
- Out of the Blue (2013) - Guardone
- Ganja Fiction (2013) - Himself
- Professione Remotti (2016) - Himself (final film role)
