= Daniele Luchetti =

Italian film director, screenwriter and actor

Daniele Lucchetti
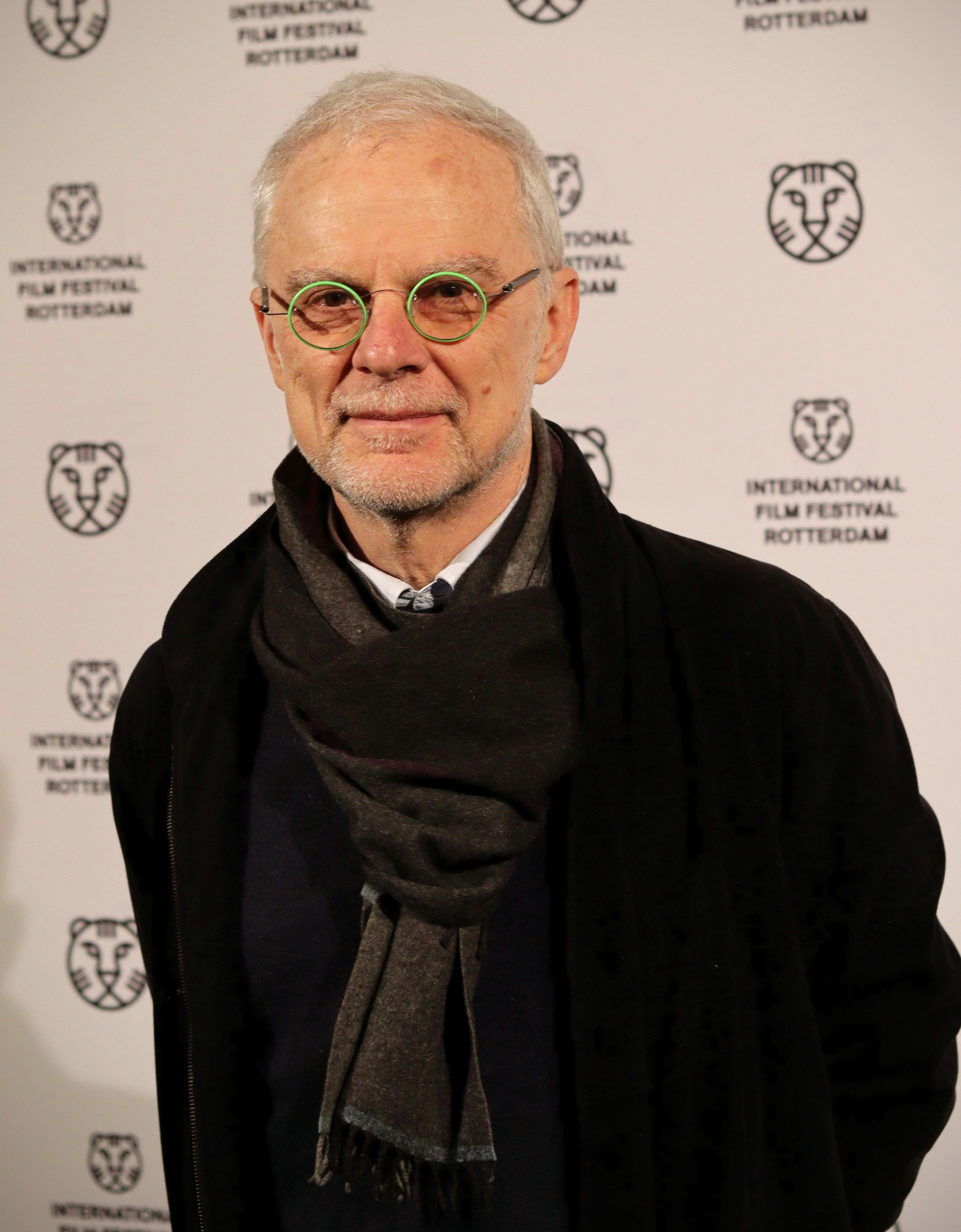
- Luchetti at the 2024 International Film Festival Rotterdam
- Born: Daniele Lucchetti; Rome, Italy
- Occupations: Film director; screenwriter
- Years active: 1983–present

Daniele Luchetti (Italian pronunciation: [luˈketti]) is an Italian film director, screenwriter and actor.

== Life and career ==
Luchetti was born in Rome. He debuted as assistant director for Nanni Moretti in Bianca (1983) and The Mass Is Ended (1985). Luchetti's first film as director was It's Happening Tomorrow of 1988, which won a David di Donatello as best debuting film and received a mention in the 1988 Cannes Film Festival.

His following work was The Yes Man (1991), featuring Silvio Orlando as the ghost-writer of a ruthless politician, played by Nanni Moretti. It was seen as a forecast of the Mani Pulite corruption scandal that struck Italy the following year. The film won four David di Donatello awards. Luchetti's play Sottobanco, inspired by Domenico Starnone's works, was turned into a feature film, La scuola ("The School", 1995).

His most recent films are My Brother Is an Only Child (2006), for which Elio Germano won the David di Donatello as best actor in a leading role, and La nostra vita (2010), which was the only Italian film selected for official competition at the 2010 Cannes Film Festival. Elio Germano shared the prize for Best Actor for his interpretation of Claudio, along with Javier Bardem. Luchetti has also directed a number of documentaries and advertisements.

== Filmography as director ==
- Juke Box (several directors, 1985)
- It's Happening Tomorrow (1988)
- The Week of the Sphinx (1990)
- The Yes Man (1991)
- The Storm Is Coming (1993)
- L'unico paese al mondo (several directors, 1994)
- La scuola (1995)
- Little Teachers (1998)
- Ginger and Cinnamon (2003)
- My Brother Is an Only Child (2006)
- La nostra vita (2010)
- Those Happy Years (2012)
- Chiamatemi Francesco (2015)
- Io sono Tempesta (2018)
- Ordinary Happiness (2019)
- The Ties (2020)
- Raffa (2023)
- Confidenza (2024)
