= Nastro d'Argento for Best Actor =

Italian film award

The Nastro d'Argento (Silver Ribbon) is a film award assigned each year, since 1946, by Sindacato Nazionale dei Giornalisti Cinematografici Italiani ("Italian National Syndicate of Film Journalists"), the association of Italian film critics.

This is the list of Nastro d'Argento awards for Best Actor. Marcello Mastroianni is the record holder with seven Nastro d'Argento awards for Best Actor received from 1955 to 1991, followed by Vittorio Gassman and Nino Manfredi, both four times winners.

== 1940s ==
- 1946 – Andrea Checchi – Two Anonymous Letters
- 1947 – Amedeo Nazzari – The Bandit
- 1948 – Vittorio De Sica – Heart
- 1949 – Massimo Girotti – In the Name of the Law

== 1950s ==
- 1950 – not awarded
- 1951 – Aldo Fabrizi – Father's Dilemma
- 1952 – Totò – Cops and Robbers
- 1953 – Renato Rascel – The Overcoat
- 1954 – Nino Taranto – Easy Years
- 1955 – Marcello Mastroianni – Days of Love
- 1956 – Alberto Sordi – The Bachelor
- 1957 – not awarded
- 1958 – Marcello Mastroianni – White Nights
- 1959 – Vittorio Gassman – Big Deal on Madonna Street

== 1960s ==
- 1960 – Alberto Sordi – The Great War
- 1961 – Marcello Mastroianni – La Dolce Vita
- 1962 – Marcello Mastroianni – Divorce, Italian Style
- 1963 – Vittorio Gassman – The Easy Life
- 1964 – Ugo Tognazzi – The Conjugal Bed
- 1965 – Saro Urzì – Seduced and Abandoned
- 1966 – Nino Manfredi – Questa volta parliamo di uomini
- 1967 – Totò – The Hawks and the Sparrows
- 1968 – Gian Maria Volonté – We Still Kill the Old Way
- 1969 – Ugo Tognazzi – La bambolona

== 1970s ==
- 1970 – Nino Manfredi – The Conspirators
- 1971 – Gian Maria Volonté – Investigation of a Citizen Above Suspicion
- 1972 – Riccardo Cucciolla – Sacco e Vanzetti
- 1973 – Giancarlo Giannini – The Seduction of Mimi
- 1974 – Giancarlo Giannini – Love and Anarchy
- 1975 – Vittorio Gassman – Scent of a Woman
- 1976 – Michele Placido – Victory March
- 1977 – Alberto Sordi – An Average Little Man
- 1978 – Nino Manfredi – In the Name of the Pope King
- 1979 – Flavio Bucci – Ligabue

== 1980s ==
- 1980 – Nino Manfredi – Café express
- 1981 – Vittorio Mezzogiorno – Three Brothers
- 1982 – Ugo Tognazzi – Tragedy of a Ridiculous Man
- 1983 – Francesco Nuti – The Pool Hustlers
- 1984 – Carlo Delle Piane – A School Outing
- 1985 – Michele Placido – Pizza connection
- 1986 – Marcello Mastroianni – Ginger and Fred
- 1987 – Roberto Benigni – Down by Law (in English language)
- 1988 – Marcello Mastroianni – Dark Eyes
- 1989 – Gian Maria Volonté – The Abyss (in French language)

== 1990s ==
- 1990 – Vittorio Gassman – The Sleazy Uncle
- 1991 – Marcello Mastroianni – Towards Evening
- 1992 – Roberto Benigni – Johnny Stecchino
- 1993 – Diego Abatantuono – Puerto Escondido
- 1994 – Paolo Villaggio – The Secret of the Old Woods
- 1995 – Alessandro Haber – The True Life of Antonio H.
- 1996 – Sergio Castellitto – The Star Maker
- 1997 – Leonardo Pieraccioni – Il ciclone
- 1998 – Roberto Benigni – Life Is Beautiful
- 1999 – Giancarlo Giannini – The Room of the Scirocco

== 2000s ==
- 2000 – Silvio Orlando – I Prefer the Sound of the Sea
- 2001 – Stefano Accorsi – The Ignorant Fairies
- 2002 – Sergio Castellitto – My Mother's Smile
- 2003
  - Neri Marcorè – Incantato
  - Gigi Proietti – Febbre da cavallo - La mandrakata
- 2004
  - Alessio Boni, Fabrizio Gifuni, Luigi Lo Cascio, Andrea Tidona – The Best of Youth
  - Roberto Herlitzka – Good Morning, Night
- 2005 – Toni Servillo – The Consequences of Love
- 2006 – Pierfrancesco Favino, Kim Rossi Stuart, Claudio Santamaria – Romanzo criminale
- 2007 – Silvio Orlando – The Caiman
- 2008 – Toni Servillo – The Girl by the Lake
- 2009 – Toni Servillo – Il Divo

== 2010s ==
- 2010
  - Elio Germano – La nostra vita
  - Christian De Sica – The Youngest Son
- 2011 – Kim Rossi Stuart – Angel of Evil
- 2012 – Pierfrancesco Favino – ACAB – All Cops Are Bastards and Piazza Fontana: The Italian Conspiracy
- 2013 – Aniello Arena – Reality
- 2014 – Fabrizio Bentivoglio and Fabrizio Gifuni – Human Capital
- 2015 – Alessandro Gassmann – An Italian Name and The Dinner
- 2016 – Stefano Accorsi – Italian Race
- 2017 – Renato Carpentieri – Tenderness
- 2018 – Marcello Fonte and Edoardo Pesce – Dogman
- 2019 – Pierfrancesco Favino – The Traitor

== 2020s ==
- 2020 – Pierfrancesco Favino – Hammamet
- 2021 – Kim Rossi Stuart – Everything's Gonna Be Alright
- 2022 – Pierfrancesco Favino – Nostalgia
  - Silvio Orlando – The Inner Cage and The Hidden Child (shared)
- 2023 – Alessandro Borghi and Luca Marinelli - The Eight Mountains (shared)
- 2024 – Michele Riondino - Palazzina Laf
- 2025 – Fabrizio Gifuni - Il tempo che ci vuole

== See also ==
- David di Donatello for Best Actor
- Cinema of Italy
