= Ciliegine =

Ciliegine can refer to

- The Italian film Cherry on the Cake
- The cherry-sized fresh mozzarella ball
