= Fabio Traversa =

Italian actor (born 1952)

- Born: 17 November 1952 (age 72); Naples, Italy
- Occupation: Actor
- Height: 1.80 m (5 ft 11 in)

Fabio Traversa (born 17 November 1952) is an Italian actor.

== Life and career ==
Born in Naples, a real life friend of Nanni Moretti, Traversa appeared in Moretti's debut medium length film Pâté de bourgeois (1973) and made his feature film debut in 1976, in Moretti's I Am Self Sufficient.

After the leading roles in two comedy-drama films by Vittorio Sindoni, Gli anni struggenti (1979) and Quasi quasi mi sposo (1982), in the early 1980s Traversa specialized as a character actor, being mainly cast in humorous roles.

== Selected filmography ==
- I Am Self Sufficient (1976)
- Ecce bombo (1978)
- Il minestrone (1981)
- The Lady of the Camellias (1981)
- Sciopèn (1982)
- Compagni di scuola (1988)
- Red Wood Pigeon (1989)
- Le comiche (1990)
- Fantozzi - Il ritorno (1996)
- Fantozzi 2000 – La clonazione (1999)
- It Can't Be All Our Fault (2003)
