= We Have a Pope (film) =

2011 dramedy film by Nanni Moretti

- Italian poster
- Latin: Habemus Papam
- Directed by: Nanni Moretti
- Written by: Nanni Moretti; Francesco Piccolo; Federica Pontremoli
- Produced by: Nanni Moretti; Domenico Procacci
- Starring: Michel Piccoli; Nanni Moretti
- Cinematography: Alessandro Pesci
- Edited by: Esmeralda Calabria
- Music by: Franco Piersanti
- Production companies: Sacher Film; Fandango; Le Pacte; France 3 Cinéma
- Distributed by: 01 Distribution (Italy); Le Pacte (France)
- Release dates: 15 April 2011 (Italy); 7 September 2011 (France)
- Running time: 104 minutes
- Countries: Italy; France
- Language: Italian
- Budget: €8 million

We Have a Pope (original title: Habemus Papam) is a 2011 comedy-drama film directed by Nanni Moretti and starring Michel Piccoli and Moretti. Its original title is Latin for 'We have a pope', the phrase used in the Roman Catholic Church upon the announcement of a new pope. The story revolves around a cardinal who, against his wishes, is elected pope; a psychoanalyst is called in to help him overcome his panic. The film premiered in Italy in April 2011 and played in competition at the 64th Cannes Film Festival.

== Plot ==
On the death of the pope, the conclave meets in Rome. Early ballots end with black smoke, since none of the main candidates reaches the quorum. After several rounds of voting, Cardinal Melville (Michel Piccoli) is elected, though he had not previously been considered a frontrunner. After a moment of hesitation, he accepts his election and becomes pope immediately.

At the moment of the public announcement, the faithful gather in St. Peter's Square and the cardinal protodeacon prepares to announce the name of the new pope. The newly elected pope has a panic attack and fails to appear on the balcony.

The spokesman of the Holy See (Jerzy Stuhr) evades questions from the press by reporting that the new pontiff felt the need to sequester himself in prayer and reflection before being introduced to the public, and by explaining that he will make his official appearance within a few hours, but the appearance does not happen. In accordance with the laws of the Church, until the identity of the new pope is announced publicly, the ceremony of election is not over and no one in the conclave can leave the Vatican. (Note: In reality, the conclave ends the moment the pope assents to his election.)

The College of Cardinals, deeply concerned by the crisis and the depression from which the new pope seems to be suffering, calls in the psychoanalyst Professor Brezzi (Nanni Moretti). The cardinals react to the psychoanalyst with some suspicion, but still allow him to examine the new pope. Brezzi, in the presence of the cardinals, tries to initiate a psychotherapy session which, however, fails to reveal any explanation for the new pope's anxieties.

Brezzi reveals that his ex-wife is also a psychoanalyst and the newly elected pope is taken secretly to see her. After meeting with her, he escapes his minders and runs away during a walk. Unaware of his absence, the cardinals kill time by playing games, ranging from cards to an international volleyball tournament organized by Brezzi.

The spokesman makes everyone believe that the Pope is in his quarters in prayer, and eventually the cardinals find Melville and give him another chance to announce his acceptance. Melville comes out onto the balcony claiming "I am not the leader you need", asks the crowd to pray "for what he is about to do", and then retreats back into St. Peter's Basilica.

== Cast ==
- Michel Piccoli as Cardinal Melville/The Pope
- Nanni Moretti as Brezzi, a psychoanalyst
- Jerzy Stuhr as the spokesman
- Massimo Dobrovic as a Swiss Guardsman
- Renato Scarpa as Cardinal Gregori
- Margherita Buy as Brezzi's ex-wife and psychoanalyst
- Franco Graziosi as Cardinal Bollati
- Leonardo Della Bianca as boy
- Camilla Ridolfi as girl
- Camillo Milli as Cardinal Pescardona
- Roberto Nobile as Cardinal Cevasco
- Gianluca Gobbi as Swiss Guard
- Ulrich von Dobschütz as Cardinal Brummer

== Production ==
We Have a Pope was announced in May 2009 as a co-production between Sacher Film, Rai Cinema and the French company Le Pacte. Fandango joined as a co-producer later in the year. The production involved a budget of eight million euro. French actor Michel Piccoli was cast in the leading role after auditioning six scenes in Italian in August 2009. The character's name, Melville, was inspired by the French filmmaker Jean-Pierre Melville. Some of the minor characters were played by members of the production team, whom Moretti found suitable for the roles when working on the set.

Principal photography started 1 February 2010 and was finished by the end of May. Studio constructions at the Cinecittà studios in Rome included replicas of the Sala Regia and the Sistine Chapel. Other scenes were shot in the Palazzo Farnese and Villa Medici, which otherwise house the French embassy and the French Academy in Rome, respectively.

== Themes ==
=== Portrayal of the conclave proceedings ===
The film reveals the overwhelming reluctance of a pope-elect to assent to his election as Supreme Pontiff. Director Nanni Moretti explained his aim with the film at the press conference following the press screening in Rome: "I wanted to depict a fragile man, Cardinal Melville, who feels inadequate in the face of power and the role he's called to fill ... I think this feeling of inadequacy happens to all cardinals elected Pope, or at least that's what they say."

The procedure of papal conclave requires a two-thirds supermajority vote to elect a new pope. Then, when the Cardinal Dean asks the pope-elect if he accepts his election, the Pope-elect is free to decline, though typically Cardinals who intend to refuse their election explicitly state this to their colleagues before a two-thirds majority is reached. The Pope-elect immediately enters office and ends the conclave once he accepts his election. All ceremonies regarding his installation are purely ceremonial.

== Release ==
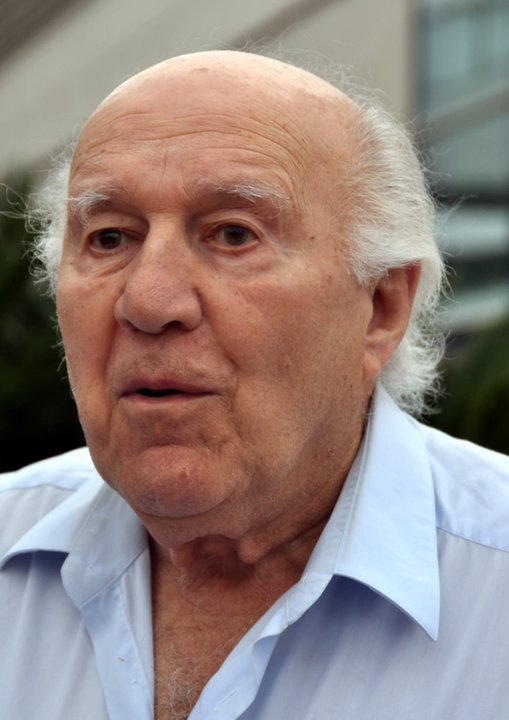
Michel Piccoli at the Cannes Film Festival for the screening of the film

The film was released in Italy on 15 April 2011 through 01 Distribution in collaboration with Sacher Distribuzione. It was launched on 460 screens. We Have a Pope showed In Competition at the 2011 Cannes Film Festival.

== Reception ==
=== Box office ===
With €1,298,524 in revenues during the first weekend, the film entered the Italian box-office chart as number two, behind the American film Rio, which premiered simultaneously.

=== Critical response ===
We Have a Pope has an approval rating of 66% on review aggregator website Rotten Tomatoes, based on 82 reviews, and an average rating of 6.1/10. Metacritic assigned the film a weighted average score of 64 out of 100, based on 25 critics, indicating "generally favorable reviews". In France Cahiers du cinéma listed the film as the best picture of the year 2011.

Deborah Young of The Hollywood Reporter called the film "a well-written, surprisingly mainstream comedy" and noted how it was less political than earlier works by Moretti, such as The Mass Is Ended and The Caiman: "Here the storyteller overpowers the moralist in every sense. Not a hint of clerical sex scandals clouds the surreal image of frolicking white-haired Cardinals; the most critical line in the film suggests the Church needs a leader who will bring great change, but even that plays as an offhand remark." Young went on to compliment the production design and cinematography, and called Moretti "one of the most creative filmmakers working in Italy". However, Young wrote, "the finale is a let-down, leaving the feeling of an artist paralyzed by his own perfectionism and his desperate search for originality at all costs."

Reactions from the Roman Catholic community were mixed. Vatican correspondent Salvatore Izzo called for a boycott of the film in the newspaper Avvenire, owned by the Italian Episcopal Conference. Izzo wrote: "We shouldn't touch the pope – the rock on which Jesus founded his Church." He continued: "Why should we support financially that which offends our religion?" Vatican Radio commented on the film and found it to contain "no irony, no caricature" of the pope. Regarding the prospect of an official condemnation of the film from church authorities, Sandro Magister, an Italian journalist specialising in Vatican issues, said: "If there were to be one, it would only help the producer. He would be very happy with a polemic that is completely without foundation."

== See also ==
- Cinema of Italy
- List of fictional clergy and religious figures
- Resignation of Pope Benedict XVI
- Pope Celestine V
- Pope John Paul I
- The Young Pope
