= Nicola Di Pinto =

Italian actor (born 1947)

- Born: 12 June 1947 (age 78); Naples, Italy
- Occupation: Actor
- Years active: 1974-present

Nicola Di Pinto (born 12 June 1947) is an Italian actor. He appeared in more than seventy films since 1974.

== Filmography ==
Year	Title	Role	Notes
1975	Vergine e di nome Maria		
1976	Victory March		
1981	Bim Bum Bam	Crippa	
1981	Sweet Dreams	Nicola	
1982	Fuori stagione		
1984	Where's Picone?		
1984	Sweet Body of Bianca	Policeman	
1985	Secrets Secrets	Maresciallo	
1986	The Professor	Alfredo Canale	
1986	The Moro Affair	Police Officer	
1986	La donna del traghetto		
1988	Cinema Paradiso	Village Idiot	
1988	What if Gargiulo Finds Out?	Friariello	
1989	Street Kids	Cotenella	
1990	Pummarò		
1990	Everybody's Fine		
1991	Ladri di futuro		
1991	Especially on Sunday	Il Pastore	(segment "Il cane blu")
1992	Death of a Neapolitan Mathematician	Dirigente comunista	
1992	Flight of the Innocent	Questor	
1994	A Pure Formality	Captain	
1994	Briganti: Amore e libertà	Lo Turco	
1995	Bidoni	Marenghi	
1995	The Star Maker	Communal Functionary	
1997	Il figlio di Bakunin	Napoletano	
1998	The Legend of 1900		
1999	Oltremare	Ignazio	
2001	Vajont	Francesco Penta	
2002	Two Friends	Pensionato	
2002	Storia di guerra e d'amicizia	Enrico	
2003	Five Moons Square	Antiquario	
2003	Il latitante	Don Antonio	
2003	Gli astronomi		
2004	Segui le ombre		
2006	Fuoco su di me	Maggiordomo	
2006	Amore e libertà - Masaniello	Padre Genoino	
2006	The Unknown Woman	Magistrato	
2008	Un amore di Gide	Prof. Cultrera	
2009	Holy Money	Marcello	
2016	Il camionista		
2021	I fratelli De Filippo	Carluccio	
2022	The White Lotus	Tommaso, the yacht captain	
