= Antonello Grimaldi =

Italian actor, director, and screenwriter

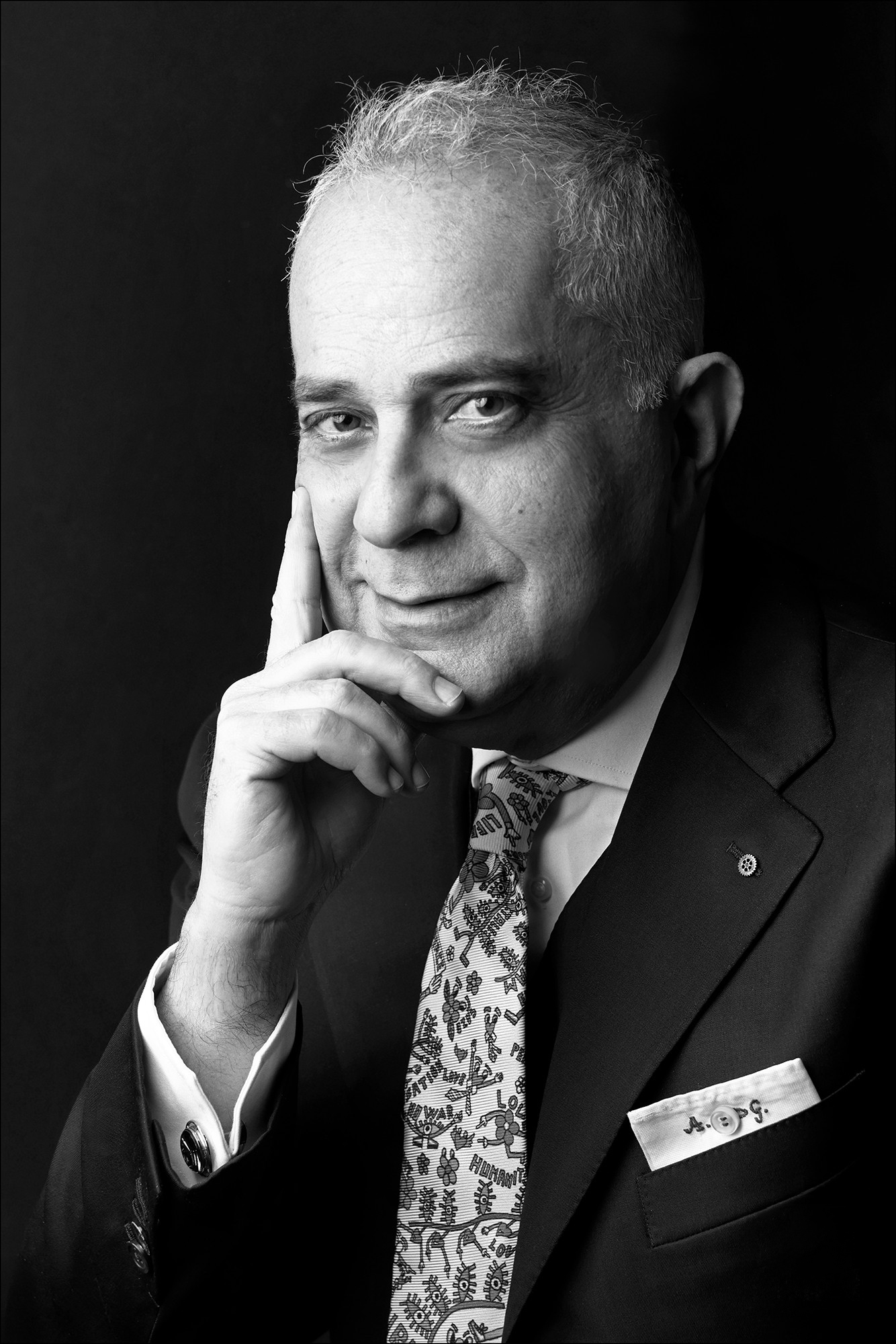
- Born: Antonio Luigi Grimaldi; 14 August 1955 (age 70); Sassari, Sardinia, Italy
- Occupation(s): Actor, director, screenwriter
- Years active: 1985–present

Antonio Luigi Grimaldi, known as Antonello Grimaldi (born 14 August 1955) is an Italian actor, film and television director, and screenwriter.

== Biography ==
Grimaldi was born on 14 August 1955 in Sassari on the island of Sardinia in Italy. After receiving his Laurea in law in 1981, he moved to Rome and attended the Gaumont School of Cinema, founded by producer Renzo Rossellini. He later taught music history at the Accademia di Belle Arti (English: Academy of Fine Arts) in Sassari and film direction at the Scuola Golden in Turin.

=== Career in film ===
Grimaldi's directorial debut came in 1985 with Juke box. In 1987, he was assistant director to Giuseppe Piccioni for the feature film Il Grande Blek, starring Sergio Rubini and Francesca Neri.

In 1997, Grimaldi appeared in Nirvana, directed by Gabriele Salvatores. He then starred in two films directed by Gabriele Muccino: Ecco fatto (1998) and Come te nessuno mai (1999), where he played the role of the head of police. Also in 1999, he appeared in Guardami, a biopic of a porn star loosely based on the life of adult actress Moana Pozzi, starring Elisabetta Cavallotti, and directed by Davide Ferrario.

In 2000, Grimaldi directed Un delitto impossibile (English: An Impossible Crime), starring Lino Capolicchio, Carlo Cecchi, Ivano Marescotti, Ángela Molina, and Silvio Muccino. Starting in 2001, he transitioned from film to television, directing the teleplay Gli insoliti ignoti (2003), the television series Le stagioni del cuore (2004), and the television miniseries La moglie cinese (2006), as well as 33 episodes of the police drama Distretto di Polizia from 2001 to 2007.

Grimaldi returned to film in 2006, with his appearance in Il caimano, directed by Nanni Moretti. In 2008, he directed Moretti, Valeria Golino, and Alessandro Gassman in Caos calmo, and also guest starred on the sitcom Boris.

In 2009, Grimaldi directed the Canale 5 television film Due mamme di troppo featuring Angela Finocchiaro and Barbara Matera.

Grimaldi directed Il Commissario Zagaira, a partly-humorous two-episode detective TV show subtitled "The Salento Murders", set in Lecce and the Salento region of Italy, starring Lino Banfi as Commissario Pasquale Zagaria, and a cast that includes Ana Caterina Morariu as Nicoletta. The show was produced in 2010 by RTI and Alba Film, and distributed through Eurochannel
