= Caro diario =

- Italian theatrical release poster
- Directed by: Nanni Moretti
- Written by: Nanni Moretti
- Produced by: Angelo Barbagallo; Nanni Moretti
- Starring: Nanni Moretti; Renato Carpentieri; Antonio Neiwiller
- Cinematography: Giuseppe Lanci
- Edited by: Mirco Garrone
- Music by: Nicola Piovani
- Production companies: Sacher Film; Banfilm; La Sept Cinéma
- Distributed by: Lucky Red (Italy); BAC Films (France)
- Release dates: 12 November 1993 (Italy); 20 May 1994 (France)
- Running time: 100 minutes
- Countries: Italy; France
- Language: Italian
- Box office: L8.3 billion (Italy)

Caro diario (lit. 'Dear diary') is a 1993 Italian-French semi-autobiographical comedy film written, directed and co-produced by Nanni Moretti, who also stars as himself. The film is structured in three anthological episodes, presented as the chapters of Moretti's open diary, in which he describes his thoughts about various slice of life situations.

The film was selected to compete for the Palme d'Or at the 1994 Cannes Film Festival, where Moretti won the Best Director Award.

== Plot ==
=== Chapter I: In Vespa (On My Vespa) ===
Putting the hot Roman summer to good use, Nanni Moretti dedicates himself to his favorite hobby, riding his Vespa through the streets of the half-deserted city.

Here, Moretti lets the landscape inspire his thoughts: he laments the banalization of politics in contemporary Italian cinema, comments on the gentrification of the quarters of Rome, mocks the overzealous critical reception of movies like Henry: Portrait of a Serial Killer, and confesses his love for dance caused by the movie Flashdance – later meeting its star Jennifer Beals. Finally, he visits the place in Ostia where Pier Paolo Pasolini was killed, to pay his respects.

=== Chapter II: Isole (Islands) ===
Having to work on an idea for a new movie, Moretti decides to leave Rome for a while for the more peaceful Aeolian Islands. In Lipari he's the guest of his friend Gerardo, an austere scholar who moved there eleven years earlier to better study James Joyce's Ulysses without being distracted by modern commodities such as television, which he despises. However, both are unable to find the tranquility they're searching for since the number of tourists has suddenly increased.

They move to Salina, where they are guests of two couples friends of Gerardo, both incapable of managing their hyperactive children, a feature that seems rampant on the entire island. Meanwhile, Gerardo begins watching television and gradually becomes completely addicted to it, and especially to soap operas. They move again, this time to Stromboli, where they are constantly bothered by a megalomaniac mayor who tries to involve them in the oddest projects.

They finally move to Alicudi, frugal and isolated, lacking water and electricity. Here Moretti seems to have found the right place to focus on his project, but soon Gerardo runs away in despair to catch the last ferry, unable to live without his favorite soap operas, while disavowing his ideals and proclaiming undying love for cheap entertainment.

=== Chapter III: Medici (Doctors) ===
Moretti clarifies to the audience that the following chapter will be based on a true story happened to him some years earlier; one day, he begins to suffer from persistent itching and insomnia. He visits many doctors and specialists, but they all dismiss him with different diagnosis, prescribing a lot of costly drugs and prohibiting him to eat most of his favorite food. Seeing no improvements, Moretti unsuccessfully tries alternative cures like reflexology and acupuncture.

After almost a year, a doctor notices his developing cough during a visit and suggests him an X-ray. That reveals a mass on his lung, which after a biopsy is discovered to be a still-curable Hodgkin's lymphoma. Moretti successfully goes through chemotherapy and has the lymphoma cured. Sometime later, he reads the definition of Hodgkin's lymphoma in a basic medical encyclopedia, finding out that its most common symptoms are exactly itching and insomnia. Surrounded by the dozens of useless drugs he bought, Moretti laments the incapability of most doctors of listening to their patients, before making a bitter toast "to health" with a glass of water.

== Cast ==
Chapter I (In Vespa)

- Nanni Moretti as himself
- Giulio Base as car driver
- Giovanna Bozzolo as actor in the Italian film
- Sebastiano Nardone as actor in the Italian film
- Antonio Petrocelli as actor in the Italian film
- Gianfranco Mecacci as inhabitant of Casal Palocco
- Italo Spinelli as man on the wall in Spinaceto
- Carlo Mazzacurati as film critic
- Jennifer Beals as herself
- Alexandre Rockwell as himself

Chapter II (Isole)

- Nanni Moretti as himself
- Renato Carpentieri as Gerardo
- Raffaella Lebboroni and Marco Paolini as the first Salina couple
- Claudia Della Seta and Lorenzo Alessandri as the second Salina couple
- Antonio Neiwiller as Mayor of Stromboli
- Conchita Airoldi as inhabitant of Panarea
- Riccardo Zinna as inhabitant of Alicudi
- Moni Ovadia as Lucio

Chapter III (Medici)

- Nanni Moretti as himself
- Mario Schiano as Prince of the dermatologists
- Valerio Magrelli as first dermatologist
- Sergio Lambiase as second dermatologist
- Roberto Nobile as third dermatologist
- Gianni Ferraretto as allergist
- Pino Gentile as Prince of the dermatologists's stand-in
- Franco Lucarelli as radiographer
- Oreste Rotundo as radiologist
- Serena Nono as reflexologist
- Yu Ming Lun as Chinese doctor
- Tou-Yui Chang Pio as Chinese doctor
- Umberto Contarello as assistant to the Chinese doctors

== Reception ==
The film grossed L8.3 billion in Italy It also grossed $3.1 million in France.

On review aggregator website Rotten Tomatoes, the film holds an approval rating of 67% based on 18 reviews, with an average rating of 6.8/10.

== Year-end lists ==
- 9th – Janet Maslin, The New York Times
- Honorable mention – David Elliott, The San Diego Union-Tribune
- Honorable mention – Jeff Simon, The Buffalo News

== Accolades ==
| Award | Date of ceremony | Category | Recipient(s) | Result | Ref |
|---|---|---|---|---|---|
| Belgian Syndicate of Cinema Critics | 9 January 1995 | Grand Prix | Nanni Moretti | Nominated | |
| Cannes Film Festival | 23 May 1994 | Best Director | Nanni Moretti | Won | |
| Cannes Film Festival | 23 May 1994 | Palme d'Or | Caro diario | Nominated | |
| César Awards | 25 February 1995 | Best Foreign Film | Caro diario | Nominated | |
| Chicago International Film Festival | 23 October 1994 | Gold Hugo | Caro diario | Nominated | |
| Cinéfest Sudbury International Film Festival | 27 September 1994 | Best International Film | Caro diario | Nominated | |
| David di Donatello Awards | 18 June 1994 | Best Film | Caro diario | Won | |
| David di Donatello Awards | 18 June 1994 | Best Director | Nanni Moretti | Nominated | |
| David di Donatello Awards | 18 June 1994 | Best Producer | Angelo Barbagallo and Nanni Moretti | Nominated | |
| David di Donatello Awards | 18 June 1994 | Best Actor | Nanni Moretti | Nominated | |
| David di Donatello Awards | 18 June 1994 | Best Screenplay | Nanni Moretti | Nominated | |
| David di Donatello Awards | 18 June 1994 | Best Cinematography | Giuseppe Lanci | Nominated | |
| David di Donatello Awards | 18 June 1994 | Best Editing | Mirco Garrone | Nominated | |
| David di Donatello Awards | 18 June 1994 | Best Score | Nicola Piovani | Won | |
| David di Donatello Awards | 18 June 1994 | Best Sound | Franco Borni | Nominated | |
| European Film Awards | 27 November 1994 | FIPRESCI Prize | Caro diario | Won | |
| Golden Ciak Awards | 30 June 1994 | Best Film | Caro diario | Won | |
| Golden Ciak Awards | 30 June 1994 | Best Director | Nanni Moretti | Won | |
| Golden Ciak Awards | 30 June 1994 | Best Screenplay | Nanni Moretti | Won | |
| Golden Ciak Awards | 30 June 1994 | Best Cinematography | Nicola Piovani | Nominated | |
| Golden Ciak Awards | 30 June 1994 | Best Editing | Mirco Garrone | Nominated | |
| Golden Ciak Awards | 30 June 1994 | Best Sound | Nicola Piovani | Won | |
| Italian Golden Globes | 6 July 1994 | Best Film | Caro diario | Won | |
| Italian Golden Globes | 6 July 1994 | Best Actor | Nanni Moretti | Nominated | |
| Italian Golden Globes | 6 July 1994 | Best Original Score | Nicola Piovani | Nominated | |
| Nastro d'Argento Awards | 19 March 1994 | Best Director | Nanni Moretti | Won | |
| Nastro d'Argento Awards | 19 March 1994 | Best Producer | Angelo Barbagallo and Nanni Moretti | Nominated | |
| Nastro d'Argento Awards | 19 March 1994 | Best Actor | Nanni Moretti | Nominated | |
| Nastro d'Argento Awards | 19 March 1994 | Best Original Story | Nanni Moretti | Nominated | |
| Nastro d'Argento Awards | 19 March 1994 | Best Score | Nicola Piovani | Nominated | |
| National Society of Film Critics Awards | 3 January 1996 | Best Foreign Language Film | Caro diario | Nominated | |
| Sant Jordi Awards | 24 May 1995 | Best Foreign Film | Caro diario | Won | |
| Stockholm Film Festival | 20 November 1994 | Bronze Horse Award | Caro diario | Nominated | |

== See also ==
- List of Italian films of 1993
