= La bambina dalle mani sporche =

- Directed by: Renzo Martinelli
- Music by: Francesco Sartori
- Country of origin: Italy
- Original language: Italian
- No. of episodes: 2

Production
- Cinematography: Blasco Giurato
- Running time: 200 minutes

Original release
- Network: Rai Uno
- Release: 23 January – 24 January 2005

La bambina dalle mani sporche ("The little girl with dirty hands") is a 2005 two-part television drama film. It is based on the novel with the same name written by Giampaolo Pansa.

== Cast ==
- Sebastiano Somma as Giulio Guala
- Ornella Muti as Wanda Rosso
- Michelle Bonev as Elena
- Remo Girone as Celeste Cuchi
- Giuliano Gemma as Procurer Concato
- Bruno Bilotta as Mastino
- Maurizio Trombini as Cesare
- Eleanora Martinelli as Chiara
- Nicola Di Pinto as The Crow
- Vincent Schiavelli as Silva Roibes
- Remo Remotti as Notaio
- Federica Martinelli as Beatrice
- Philippe Leroy as Ciutti
