= Sweet Dreams (1981 film) =

1981 film by Nanni Moretti

- Italian theatrical release poster
- Directed by: Nanni Moretti
- Written by: Nanni Moretti
- Produced by: Renzo Rossellini
- Starring: Nanni Moretti; Laura Morante; Alessandro Haber
- Cinematography: Franco Di Giacomo
- Edited by: Roberto Perpignani
- Music by: Franco Piersanti
- Release date: 1981
- Running time: 105 minutes
- Country: Italy
- Language: Italian

Sweet Dreams (Italian: Sogni d'oro, also known as Golden Dreams) is a 1981 Italian comedy-drama film directed, written and starring Nanni Moretti. It entered the 38th Venice International Film Festival, in which won the Special Jury Prize.

== Plot ==
Michele Apicella (Nanni Moretti) is a young filmmaker on a lecture tour, speaking to audiences after screenings of his films. An insistent audience member (Dario Cantarelli) who appears at all the different venues repeatedly tells Michele that his films lack social relevance, challenging him to ‘show this film to a labourer from Basilicata, a shepherd from Abruzzo or a housewife from Treviso’.

Having finished the lecture tour, Michele returns home to the house that he shares with his mother (Piera Degli Esposti) and begins working on a new project, a film called Freud’s Mother. The strain of making the film takes its toll on him, and he retreats into a dream world in which he works as a teacher at a school and falls in love with one of his students, Silvia (Laura Morante). The dream turns sour as Silvia announces that she is moving to Argentina and will be gone for two years. This separation from Silvia drives Michele to the brink, and upon her return he transforms into a werewolf and chases her out of a restaurant, shouting ‘I’m a monster and I love you!’

== Cast ==
- Nanni Moretti: Michele Apicella
- Nicola Di Pinto: Nicola
- Laura Morante: Silvia
- Remo Remotti: Freud
- Piera Degli Esposti: Michele's mother
- Alessandro Haber: Gaetano
- Gigio Morra: Gigio Cimino
- Giampiero Mughini: TV presenter
- Miranda Campa: Freud's mother
- Vincenzo Salemme: cultural operator

== See also ==
- List of Italian films of 1981
