= April (1998 film) =

Aprile
- French film poster
- Directed by: Nanni Moretti
- Written by: Nanni Moretti
- Produced by: Angelo Barbagallo; Jean Labadie; Nanni Moretti
- Starring: Nanni Moretti; Silvio Orlando; Silvia Nono; Daniele Luchetti
- Cinematography: Giuseppe Lanci
- Edited by: Angelo Nicolini
- Music by: Ludovico Einaudi
- Distributed by: Tandem Distribuzione
- Release date: 20 May 1998 (France)
- Running time: 78 minutes
- Country: Italy
- Language: Italian

April (Italian: Aprile) is a 1998 Italian semi-autobiographical film written and directed by Nanni Moretti. Moretti also plays the central character, a filmmaker who has to deal with Italy's political situation, his own goals as an artist and becoming a father.

The French director Claire Denis described the film thus, "He wants to make a musical comedy but he can't get started. So instead he talks about his life, his new baby, his desires and fears. Finally in the very last scene he begins."

Moretti's wife, son and mother appear as themselves.

== Plot ==
Following the general election of 1994, won by the centre-right coalition led by Silvio Berlusconi, Moretti is encouraged by a journalist friend to make a documentary about the current political situation in Italy. Two years pass, another election is held, and Moretti has still made no progress with his documentary. He begins shooting another project, alluded to in Dear Diary, a musical about a Trotskyist pastry chef set in the 1950s, but he becomes disillusioned and is distracted by his wife Silvia's pregnancy, which preoccupies him more and more. His son Pietro is born, and the centre-left coalition Ulivo wins the election. Moretti continues to try to shoot his documentary in Venice and Apulia, but the film is never finished. On his 44th birthday he realises that he must stop hesitating and he finally begins shooting his musical in earnest.

== Cast ==
- Nanni Moretti as himself
- Silvio Orlando as himself
- Silvia Nono as herself
- Pietro Moretti as himself
- Agata Apicella Moretti as herself
- Nuria Schoenberg as herself
- Silvia Bonucci as herself
- Quentin de Fouchécour as himself
- Renato De Maria as himself
- Claudio Francia as himself
- Jacopo Francia as himself
- Matilde Francia as herself
- Daniele Luchetti as himself
- Giovanna Nicolai as herself
- Nicola Piepoli as himself

== Awards ==
- David di Donatello 1998: Best Supporting Actor (Silvio Orlando)
- Cannes Film Festival Palme d'Or (nominated)
