= The Lady of the Camellias (1981 film) =

1981 film

- DVD cover
- Directed by: Mauro Bolognini
- Written by: Alexandre Dumas fils Jean Aurenche; Vladimir Salomonovitch Pozner
- Produced by: Manolo Bolognini; Margaret Ménégoz
- Starring: Isabelle Huppert; Gian Maria Volonté
- Cinematography: Ennio Guarnieri
- Edited by: Nino Baragli
- Music by: Ennio Morricone
- Distributed by: Gaumont Distribution
- Release dates: 26 February 1981 (Italy); 11 March 1981 (France)
- Running time: 115 minutes
- Countries: France; Italy
- Language: French

The Lady of the Camellias (French: La Dame aux camélias, Italian: La storia vera della signora dalle camelie) is a 1981 French-Italian drama film directed by Mauro Bolognini and starring Isabelle Huppert. It tells the actual story of Alphonsine Plessis, who became a famous courtesan in Paris and the inspiration for the novel La Dame aux camélias by Alexandre Dumas, fils, which has in turn become the source for many plays, operas, ballets, and films.

== Plot ==
Alphonsine, growing up motherless in absolute poverty, goes alone to Paris and finds work as a seamstress. In the evening most of the girls she works with work as prostitutes but one is a cloakroom attendant at the opera house and takes her there to help. Seeing high society on display fills her with the desire to join their world.

Illiterate, her only asset being her body, she soon becomes the mistress of a young nobleman. From him she passes to a wealthy old aristocrat and then elopes to England with the Count de Perregaux, who marries her there. Though he makes her a Countess and gives her a taste for opium, he finds matrimony is not for him and leaves her free to live her own life. Never short of admirers, she becomes one of the most famous courtesans in Paris, attracting even Franz Liszt.

Among many struck by her fame and charm is a young writer Alexandre Dumas, fils, son of the illustrious writer Alexandre Dumas, père. For a while he persuades her to stay with him in the country, in the hope it will assuage her tuberculosis and curb her wild spending. But she wants to go out as she has lived and, returning to her Parisian world, dies in 1847 at age 23, leaving behind massive debt. Alexandre turns her story into a novel, which is a great success.

== Cast ==
- Isabelle Huppert as Alphonsine Plessis
- Gian Maria Volonté as Plessis
- Bruno Ganz as Count Perregaux
- Fabrizio Bentivoglio as Dumas son
- Clio Goldsmith as Clemence
- Mario Maranzana as Dumas father
- Yann Babilée as Agenor
- Carla Fracci as Marguerite Gauthier
- Cécile Vassort as Henriette
- David Jalil as Maxence
- Piero Vida
- Fabio Traversa as Priest
- Remo Remotti
- Mattia Sbragia
- Clara Colosimo
- Gina Rovere
- Stefania Pierangelini as Thérèse
- Fernando Rey as Count Stackelberg

== Release ==
The Lady of the Camellias was released in Italy in Rome, Milan, and Bologna on February 26, 1981. It was released in France on March 11, 1981.
