= The Youngest Son =

- Italian: Il figlio più piccolo
- Directed by: Pupi Avati
- Written by: Pupi Avati
- Produced by: Antonio Avati
- Starring: Christian De Sica; Laura Morante; Luca Zingaretti; Nicola Nocella
- Cinematography: Pasquale Rachini
- Music by: Riz Ortolani
- Release date: 19 February 2010
- Running time: 105 minutes
- Country: Italy
- Language: Italian

The Youngest Son (Italian: Il figlio più piccolo) is a 2010 Italian comedy drama film directed by Pupi Avati. It entered the 2010 WorldFest-Houston International Film Festival, in which it won the Remi Grand Award for best theatrical feature. For this film Christian De Sica won Nastro d'Argento for best actor and Luca Zingaretti was awarded with a Nastro d'Argento for best supporting actor.

== Plot ==
Luciano Baietti (Christian De Sica) is a man who has always taken advantage of the weakness of character of his wife Fiamma (Laura Morante) and his two sons Paul and Baldo. In fact, he, getting with deception, cheating, fraud and tax evasion for hotels and restaurant chains and small corporations, which now has abandoned his wife and children after marriage, psychologically destroying Fiamma and Baldo. Paul is the only one who has overcome the trauma, harboring a deep hatred of true parent and repeatedly threatened with death. After about twenty years of marriage, Luciano finds himself in trouble for all the tricks he did with his secretaries and Sticker Pillar who trust him blindly, and now must find a way out. Will find it in his youngest son Baldo which although has which 20 years is still a big kid dominated by the mother, who tries to rebuild his life creandosi a poor musical group of which he is the singer together with an old friend, but also his brother who treated as a mental patient. So Baldo, believing that review after so many years, the beloved father was invited to his villa why are headed all the properties and buildings that his father bought the scam. However, Luciano, who hopes to be saved from disaster by a second marriage is discovered, the wedding go awry, and he was arrested by the police. Baldo increasingly confused and desperate to return home to his family, and soon also joins Luciano, now reduced to a pauper after release from prison.

== Cast ==
- Christian De Sica: Luciano Baietti
- Laura Morante: Fiamma
- Luca Zingaretti: Bollino
- Nicola Nocella: Baldo Baietti
- Matilde Matteucci: Roberta
- Marcello Maietta: Paolo Baietti
- Maurizio Battista: Nazareno
- Massimo Bonetti: Pilastro
- Alessandra Acciai: Dina Diasparro
- Pino Quartullo: the helicopter pilot
- Sydne Rome: Sheyla
