= The Ties =

2020 film

- Theatrical release poster
- Italian: Lacci
- Directed by: Daniele Luchetti
- Screenplay by: Domenico Starnone; Francesco Piccolo; Daniele Luchetti
- Based on: Lacci by Domenico Starnone
- Produced by: Beppe Caschetto
- Starring: Alba Rohrwacher; Luigi Lo Cascio; Laura Morante; Silvio Orlando; Giovanna Mezzogiorno; Adriano Giannini; Linda Caridi; Francesca De Sapio
- Cinematography: Ivan Casalgrandi
- Edited by: Daniele Luchetti; Aël Dallier Vega
- Production companies: IBC Movie; Rai Cinema
- Distributed by: 01 Distribution
- Release dates: September 2, 2020 (Venice); October 1, 2020 (Italy)
- Running time: 100 minutes
- Country: Italy
- Language: Italian

The Ties (Italian: Lacci) is a 2020 Italian romantic drama film directed by Daniele Luchetti, based on the 2014 novel of the same name by Domenico Starnone. It stars Alba Rohrwacher, Luigi Lo Cascio, Laura Morante, Silvio Orlando, Giovanna Mezzogiorno, Adriano Giannini, Linda Caridi, and Francesca De Sapio.

It was selected as the opening film of the 77th Venice International Film Festival, the first Italian film to open the festival since Baarìa (2009).

== Plot ==
In early 1980s Naples, the marriage of a loving couple is threatened by a potential affair between the husband and a younger woman.

== Cast ==
- Alba Rohrwacher as Vanda
- Luigi Lo Cascio as Aldo
- Laura Morante
- Silvio Orlando
- Giovanna Mezzogiorno
- Adriano Giannini
- Linda Caridi
- Francesca De Sapio
- Vito Vinci
- Simona Tabasco
- Antonella Monetti
- Joshua Francesco
- Luis Cerciello
- Giulia De Luca
- Giovannino Esposito
- Sveva Esposito

== Release ==
The film will have its world premiere on 2 September 2020 at the 77th Venice International Film Festival, out of competition. The film is scheduled to be released in Italy on 1 October 2020 by 01 Distribution.

It was the opening night film of the 2021 San Diego Italian Film Festival in October 2021.

== Reception ==
On the review aggregator website Rotten Tomatoes, 73% of 11 critics' reviews are positive.
