= Opening Day of Close-Up =

- Directed by: Nanni Moretti
- Cinematography: Alessandro Pesci
- Release date: May 1996
- Running time: 7 minutes
- Country: Italy
- Language: Italian

Opening Day of Close-Up (Italian: Il giorno della prima di Close Up) is a 1996 Italian short film directed by Nanni Moretti. It was screened out of competition at the 1996 Cannes Film Festival.

== Plot ==
Moretti plays himself, running the movie theater he owns in Rome. In the film, Moretti is endlessly anxious with the wish for his patrons to watch and appreciate Abbas Kiarostami's Close-Up (1990), in the face of reports that other films are selling far more tickets.

== Cast ==
- Fabia Bergamo
- Paolo Di Virgilio
- Paola Orfei
- Fausto Polacco
- Amleto Vitali
- Nanni Moretti as Himself
