= Laura Morante =

Italian actress (born 1956)

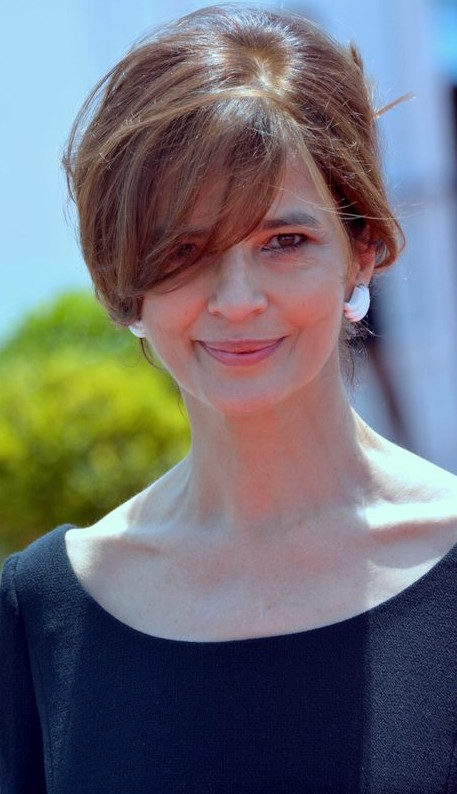
- Morante at the 2017 Cannes Film Festival
- Born: 21 August 1956 (age 70); Santa Fiora, Tuscany, Italy
- Occupation: Actress

Laura Morante (born 21 August 1956) is an Italian film actress.

== Life and career ==
Morante was born in Santa Fiora, province of Grosseto (Tuscany), the daughter of lawyer and playwright Marcello Morante, who was the son of Irma (née Poggibonsi) (a schoolteacher of Jewish descent) and Francesco Lo Monaco, from Sicily, and brother of the novelist Elsa Morante. Laura's mother is Maria Bona Palazzeschi.

Originally a dancer, Morante started her acting career on stage at 18 years old, in the theatrical company of Carmelo Bene. She made her film debut in Oggetti smarriti (Lost Belongings), directed by Giuseppe Bertolucci, whose brother would direct the second film in which Morante would appear, Tragedy of a Ridiculous Man. She eventually had her breakout thanks to Nanni Moretti, who gave her the title role in Sweet Body of Bianca.

After her marriage to French actor Georges Claisse, Morante moved to Paris, where, thanks to her participation in numerous productions, she acquired a certain level of notoriety in European art cinema. Returning to Italy, in 2001 she eventually won the David di Donatello for best actress her performance in Moretti's The Son's Room. Later she was nominated for the David di Donatello in the same category in 2003, for Gabriele Muccino's Remember Me, My Love, and won the Silver Ribbon for best actress for Love Is Eternal While It Lasts (2003) by Carlo Verdone.

Morante attracted considerable attention with her performance as the neglected Madame Jourdain, with whom the young Molière, played by Romain Duris, falls in love, in the 2007 release Molière. She also provided the voice of Helen Parr/Elastigirl in the Italian-dubbed version of the Pixar animated film, The Incredibles. Very active in France, in 2012 Morante made her directorial debut with the French-Italian co-production Cherry on the Cake, for which she was nominated for the David di Donatello for Best New Director.

== Filmography ==
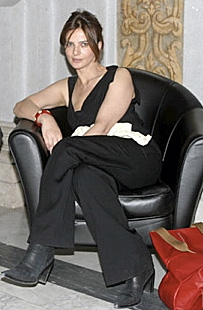
Laura Morante in 2007

=== Films ===
| Year | Title | Role(s) | Notes |
|---|---|---|---|
| 1980 | Lost Items | Sara | |
| 1981 | Tragedy of a Ridiculous Man | Laura | |
| 1981 | Sweet Dreams | Silvia | |
| 1982 | Blow to the Heart | Giulia | |
| 1983 | Il momento dell'avventura (The Moment of the Adventure) | Anna | |
| 1984 | Sweet Body of Bianca | Bianca | |
| 1984 | The Two Lives of Mattia Pascal | Adriana Paleari | |
| 1984 | L'air du crime (The Air of Crime) | Alice | |
| 1986 | À flor do mar | Laura Rossellini | |
| 1987 | Man on Fire | Julia | |
| 1987 | The Ghost Valley | Dara | |
| 1987 | Pink Palace, Paradise Beach | Anja | |
| 1987 | Distant Lights | Renata | |
| 1988 | The Boys of Panisperna Street | Laura Capon Fermi | |
| 1988 | Un amore di donna (A Love of Donna) | Gabriella Bernasconi | |
| 1989 | Corps perdus (Lost Bodies) | Laura Canetti | |
| 1990 | On Tour | Vittoria | |
| 1990 | On jeu d'enfant (It's Child's Play) | Marguerite | |
| 1990 | Traces of an Amorous Life | Agnese | |
| 1990 | La femme fardée (The Painted Woman) | Clarisse Lethuillier | |
| 1991 | La camera da letto (Bedroom) | Herself | Documentary film |
| 1992 | La voix (The Voice) | Laura | |
| 1992 | Juste avant l'orange (Just Before the Orange) | Charlotte | |
| 1995 | Me and the King | Beatrice | |
| 1996 | August Vacation | Cecilia Sarcoli | |
| 1997 | Marianna Ucrìa | Maria | |
| 1997 | Santo Stefano (Saint Stephen) | Anna D'Assisi | |
| 1998 | The Naked Eye | Begoña | |
| 1998 | Coppia omicida (Homicidal Couple) | Carla | |
| 1999 | The Anniversary | Anita | |
| 2000 | Free the Fish | Mara | |
| 2000 | First Light of Dawn | Anna | |
| 2001 | The Son's Room | Paola | |
| 2001 | Hotel | Greta | |
| 2001 | Vajont | Tina Merlin | |
| 2002 | The Dancer Upstairs | Yolanda | |
| 2002 | A Journey Called Love | Sibilla Aleramo | |
| 2003 | Remember Me, My Love | Giulia Ristuccia | |
| 2004 | Love Is Eternal While It Lasts | Tiziana Lombardi | |
| 2004 | Notte senza fine (Endless Night) | Kenza | |
| 2004 | The Incredibles | Helen Parr / Elastigirl | Italian dub, voice role |
| 2005 | Empire of the Wolves | Mathilde Urano | |
| 2006 | Avenue Montaigne | Valentine | |
| 2006 | L'estate del mio primo bacio (The Summer Of My First Kiss) | Giovanna Sinibaldi | |
| 2006 | Coeurs (Hearts) | Nicole | |
| 2006 | Liscio (Smooth) | Monica | |
| 2007 | The Hideout | Her | |
| 2007 | Molière | Elmire Jourdain | |
| 2008 | The Anarchist's Wife | Lucienne | |
| 2009 | The Big Dream | Maddalena | |
| 2010 | The Youngest Son | Fiamma | |
| 2010 | Love & Slaps | Marina Sinibaldi | |
| 2011 | Apartment in Athens | Zoe Helianos | |
| 2012 | Cherry on the Cake | Amanda | Also director |
| 2013 | Romeo & Juliet | Lady Montecchi | |
| 2013 | A Farewell to Fools | Margherita | |
| 2014 | Non mi pettina bene come il vento (It Doesn't Comb My Hair As Well As the Wind) | Arianna | |
| 2014 | Ogni maledetto Natale (Every Damn Christmas) | Maria / Ludovica | |
| 2015 | God Willing | Carla De Luca | |
| 2016 | Solo | Flavia | Also director |
| 2016 | L'età d'oro (The Golden Age) | Arabella | |
| 2018 | Bob & Marys: Criminali a domicilio (Criminals at Home) | Marisa | |
| 2018 | The Armadillo Prophecy | Zero's mother | |
| 2018 | The Stolen Caravaggio | Amalia Roberti | |
| 2020 | The Ties | Older Vanda | |
| 2022 | Across the River and into the Trees | Countess Contarini | |
| 2022 | Masquerade | Julia | |
| 2022 | The Hummingbird | Letizia Carrera | |
| 2024 | Another Summer Holiday | Cecilia Sarcoli | |
| 2024 | Feeling Better | Veteran | |
| 2025 | Twin Stars | Lucia | |

=== Television ===
| Year | Show | Role(s) | Notes |
|---|---|---|---|
| 1981 | Le ali della colomba | Milly Theale | 3 episodes |
| 1981 | George Sand | Titine | Miniseries |
| 1984 | Notti e nebbie | Noemi | Television film |
| 1985 | Il corsaro | Arlette | Miniseries |
| 1985 | Goya | Duchess of Alba | Recurring role; 4 episodes |
| 1986 | Väter und Söhne – Eine deutsche Tragödie | Judith Bernheim | Main role |
| 1987 | Il generale | Anita Garibaldi | 2 episodes |
| 1994 | L'ombra della sera | Eva | Television film |
| 1995 | La famiglia Ricordi | Giuseppina Strepponi | Miniseries |
| 1995 | Un orage immobile | Flora de Margelasse | Television film |
| 1995 | L'Affaire Dreyfus | Lucie Dreyfus | Television film |
| 2000 | Dov'è mio figlio | Luisa Ellis | Television film |
| 2003 | Mother Teresa of Calcutta | Mother Cenacle | Television film |
| 2004 | Nero | Agrippina the Younger | Television film |
| 2010 | Boris | Woman on terrace | Episode: "L'epifania" |
| 2014 | Marco Polo | Marco's aunt | Episode: "The Wayfarer" |
| 2015 | Con il sole negli occhi | Carla | Television film |
| 2021–2023 | A casa tutti bene | Alba Ristuccia | Series regular |
| 2023 | Alphonse | Laura Tomazi | Main role |
| 2024 | Folle d'amore | Alda Merini | Television film |

== Awards and nominations ==
| Year | Award | Category | Work | Result |
|---|---|---|---|---|
| 1984 | David di Donatello Awards | Best Actress | Sweet Body of Bianca | Nominated |
| 1996 | David di Donatello Awards | Best Actress | August Vacation | Nominated |
| 2001 | David di Donatello Awards | Best Actress | The Son's Room | Won |
| 2001 | European Film Awards | Best Actress | The Son's Room | Nominated |
| 2002 | European Film Awards | Best Actress | A Journey Called Love | Nominated |

=== Theatre ===
| Year | Title | Author and director | Notes |
|---|---|---|---|
| 2026 | Insieme | Fabio Marra | Presented at the Campania Teatro Festival, Teatro Mercadante in Naples, with Laura Morante, Eugenia Costantini, Fabio Marra and Sonia Palau |
