= The Yes Man =

1991 film

- Film poster
- Directed by: Daniele Luchetti
- Written by: Daniele Luchetti; Franco Bernini
- Produced by: Angelo Barbagallo; Nanni Moretti
- Starring: Silvio Orlando
- Cinematography: Alessandro Pesci
- Edited by: Mirco Garrone
- Release date: 5 April 1991
- Running time: 95 minutes
- Country: Italy
- Language: Italian

The Yes Man (Italian: Il portaborse) is a 1991 Italian drama film directed by Daniele Luchetti. It was entered into the 1991 Cannes Film Festival.

== Cast ==
- Silvio Orlando - Luciano Sandulli
- Nanni Moretti - Cesare Botero
- Giulio Brogi - Francesco Sanna
- Anne Roussel - Juliette
- Angela Finocchiaro - Irene
- Graziano Giusti - Sebastiano Tramonti
- Lucio Allocca - Remo Gola
- Dario Cantarelli - Carissimi
- Antonio Petrocelli - Polline
- Gianna Paola Scaffidi - Adriana
- Giulio Base - Botero's driver
- Guido Alberti - Carlo Sperati
- Renato Carpentieri - Sartorio
- Silvia Cohen - Botero's wife (as Silva Cohen)
- Roberto De Francesco - Zollo
- Dino Valdi - Federico Castri
- Ivano Marescotti - Provincial Secretary
- Salvatore Puntillo - Marco Tullio Illica
- Giacomo Piperno - Medical Director
