= Ecce bombo =

1978 Italian comedy film

- Directed by: Nanni Moretti
- Written by: Nanni Moretti
- Produced by: Mario Gallo; Enzo Giulioli
- Starring: Nanni Moretti; Fabio Traversa; Luisa Rossi
- Cinematography: Giuseppe Pinori
- Edited by: Enzo Meniconi
- Music by: Franco Piersanti
- Release date: 8 March 1978
- Running time: 103 minutes
- Country: Italy
- Language: Italian

Ecce Bombo is a 1978 Italian comedy film written and directed by and starring Nanni Moretti. It was filmed in 16 mm but released in 35 mm. It was Moretti's first commercial success.

== Plot ==
Michele Apicella, Goffredo, Mirko and Vito are four highschool friends who were on the forefront of the political protests that characterized the second half of the 1960s. Now a few years older, the four friends are no longer politically active and struggle to come to terms with their present. Intellectually marginalized and disenchanted with contemporary society, they form a collective consciousness group to try to understand what to do with themselves. Another friend, Cesare, decides to join them although he has mixed feelings about the whole experience, leading a relatively comfortable life. Things change when Michele starts a relationship with Cesare's girlfriend Flaminia.

== Cast ==
- Nanni Moretti - Michele Apicella
- Luisa Rossi - Michele's mother
- Glauco Mauri - Michele's father
- Lina Sastri - Olga
- Piero Galletti - Goffredo
- Susanna Javicoli - Silvia
- Cristina Manni - Cristina
- Lorenza Ralli - Michele's sister Valentina
- Maurizio Romoli - Flaminia's husband Cesare
- Carola Stagnaro - Flaminia
- Fabio Traversa - Mirko
- Giorgio Viterbo - Reporter for 'Telecalifornia'
- Paolo Zaccagnini - Vito
- Sandro Conte - Student
- Maurizio Di Taddeo - Student
- Mauro Fabretti - Student

== Awards ==
- Nastro d'Argento: Best Story
- Nominated for the Golden Palm at the 1978 Cannes Film Festival
