= Quiet Chaos (film) =

- Directed by: Antonello Grimaldi
- Screenplay by: Nanni Moretti; Laura Paolucci; Francesco Piccolo
- Based on: Caos calmo by Sandro Veronesi
- Produced by: Domenico Procacci
- Starring: Nanni Moretti; Valeria Golino; Alessandro Gassmann; Blu Yoshimi; Hippolyte Girardot; Kasia Smutniak; Denis Podalydès; Charles Berling; Silvio Orlando
- Cinematography: Alessandro Pesci
- Edited by: Angelo Nicolini
- Music by: Paolo Buonvino; Ivano Fossati
- Production companies: Fandango; Rai Cinema
- Distributed by: 01 Distribution
- Release date: 1 February 2008
- Running time: 112 minutes
- Country: Italy
- Language: Italian
- Budget: $5.5 million
- Box office: $9.2 million

Quiet Chaos (Italian: Caos calmo) is a 2008 Italian drama film, directed by Antonello Grimaldi and based on the novel of the same name by Sandro Veronesi.

== Plot ==
Pietro Paladini and his brother Carlo, a fashion designer, rescue two women from drowning. At the same time Pietro's wife dies unexpectedly at home. After the funeral, Pietro falls into a state of Quiet Chaos, which is marked by spending a lot of time with his daughter Claudia. The manager is absent from his work and spends his days waiting in the park, which is opposite the school of his daughter. All the while, the widower stays very calm on the outside and is a focal point for his wife's sister Marta (Valeria Golino), his brother and co-workers who are affected by the merger of his group. It is the rebirth of a man who was once a tough manager.

== Cast ==
- Nanni Moretti: Pietro Paladini
- Valeria Golino: Marta Siciliano
- Isabella Ferrari: Eleonora Simoncini
- Hippolyte Girardot: Jean Claude
- Alessandro Gassman: Carlo Paladini
- Silvio Orlando: Samuele
- Blu Yoshimi: Claudia Paladini
- Antonella Attili: maestra Gloria
- Manuela Morabito: Maria Grazia
- Beatrice Bruschi: Benedetta
- Alba Rohrwacher: Annalisa
- Kasia Smutniak: Jolanda
- Roberto Nobile: Taramanni
- Sara D'Amario: Francesca
- Charles Berling: Boesson
- Roman Polanski: Steiner
- Denis Podalydes: Thierry
- Babak Karimi: Mario
- Stefano Guglielmi: Matteo
- Tatiana Lepore: Mamma Matteo
- Cloris Brosca: Psicoterapeuta
- Valentina Gaia: Ragazza Conferenza
- Valentina Carnelutti: Mamma 1
- Anna Gigante: Mamma 2
- Nestor Saied: Marito Simoncini
- Roberta Bruni(actress)|Roberta Bruni: Insegnante Gimnastica
- Ugo De Cesare: Ragazzo Cena Gala
- Dina Braschi: Dona Anziana Cena Gala
- Claudia Alfonso: Ragazza Cena Gala
- Cinzia Bernardini: Altra Donna Cena Gala
- Lamberto Antinori: Uomo Cena Gala
- Ester Cavallari: Lara
- Il Cane Riccardo: Nebbia
- La Scimmia Di Peluche: Pupa

== Reception ==
Stanley Kauffmann of The New Republic called Quiet Chaos "thoughtful and rich."
