= Where's Picone? =

- Film poster
- Directed by: Nanni Loy
- Written by: Nanni Loy; Elvio Porta
- Produced by: Gianni Minervini
- Starring: Giancarlo Giannini; Lina Sastri
- Cinematography: Claudio Cirillo
- Edited by: Franco Fraticelli
- Music by: Tullio De Piscopo
- Release date: 12 January 1984
- Running time: 122 minutes
- Country: Italy
- Language: Italian

Where's Picone? (Italian: Mi manda Picone, also known as Picone Sent Me) is a 1983 Italian comedy film directed by Nanni Loy. Although selected as the Italian entry for the Best Foreign Language Film at the 57th Academy Awards, it was not nominated.

== Plot ==
During a debate in Naples' town hall during the early 80s Pasquale Picone, a former Italsider (Italy's then state-owned steel company) worker who had recently lost his job pulls out a jerrycan of gasoline and sets himself alight in front of the Municipal Council, his wife and her three kids are unable to find out where he has been taken after an ambulance arrives with unusual haste and disappears with him on board. Desperate for news about her husband, the woman hires an unlikely kind of 'private eye' (Giancarlo Giannini), in the form of Salvatore Cannavacciuolo, a man who ekes out a living giving informations to people visiting the morgue for one thousand lire apiece. During his investigations Salvatore (who had his less than noble motivations to accept the task) finds out that Pasquale never worked for Italsider, he merely pretended to so; that way he could hide from his own family the fact that he was involved into a veritable web of deals ranging from contraband, to gambling and to outright criminal enterprises linked to the 'Camorra' (the Neapolitan version of the Mob) and its underground. Hoping to profit from this knowledge Salvatore delves deeper and deeper into Picone's secret life with results ranging from the farcical to the dangerous in a movie which can be seen as one of the last examples of the Commedia all'Italiana genre (here hybridized with the detective story).

== Cast ==
- Giancarlo Giannini as Salvatore Cannavacciuolo
- Lina Sastri as Luciella
- Aldo Giuffrè as Cocò
- Leo Gullotta as Sgueglia
- Marzio Honorato as O' Micione
- Carlo Croccolo as Armando, the baron
- Clelia Rondinella as Teresa
- Carlo Taranto as Gallina
- Mirella Migliore as Salumiere
- Tommaso Palladino as Pasquale Picone
- Remo Remotti as Don Armando Bellucore
- Antonio Allocca as Hospital doorman
- Nicola Di Pinto as Municipal Clerk

== Reception ==
For this film Lina Sastri was awarded with a David di Donatello for Best Actress and a Silver Ribbon in the same category. The actors Giancarlo Giannini and Leo Gullotta instead won a David di Donatello for Best Actor and a Silver Ribbon for Best supporting Actor. Furthermore, the producer Gianni Minervini was awarded with a David di Donatello and a Silver Ribbon for best producer, and Nanny Loy and Elvio Porta won the Nastro d'Argento for Best screenplay. The film was also selected as the Italian entry for the Best Foreign Language Film at the 57th Academy Awards, but was not accepted as a nominee.

== See also ==
- List of submissions to the 57th Academy Awards for Best Foreign Language Film
- List of Italian submissions for the Academy Award for Best Foreign Language Film
