= Tragedy of a Ridiculous Man =

- Directed by: Bernardo Bertolucci
- Written by: Bernardo Bertolucci
- Produced by: Giovanni Bertolucci
- Starring: Ugo Tognazzi; Anouk Aimée
- Cinematography: Carlo Di Palma
- Edited by: Gabriella Cristiani
- Music by: Ennio Morricone
- Production company: Fiction Cinematografica SpA
- Distributed by: PIC Distribuzione (Italy); The Ladd Company (International; thru Warner Bros.)
- Release date: 12 February 1982 (US)
- Running time: 116 minutes
- Country: Italy
- Language: Italian

Tragedy of a Ridiculous Man (Italian: La tragedia di un uomo ridicolo) is a 1981 Italian film directed by Bernardo Bertolucci. It stars Anouk Aimée and Ugo Tognazzi, who was awarded the Best Male Actor Award at the 1981 Cannes Film Festival for his performance. In his review, Vincent Canby describes the film as, "Bernardo Bertolucci's very good, cerebrally tantalizing new film, Tragedy of a Ridiculous Man, the story of what may or may not be a terrorist kidnapping of the sort that has been making Italian headlines with increasing frequency in recent years."

== Plot ==
Primo Spaggiari is a small cheese factory owner from Parma. Primo is of peasant origin and did not go beyond elementary school, so he is considered a self-made man. His wife Barbara, on the other hand, is a refined woman of French origin. One day, their son Giovanni is kidnapped by a group of terrorists and Primo has to raise a billion lire for the ransom. Meanwhile, the dairy he owns is hit by a serious economic crisis.

A young worker, Laura, Giovanni's girlfriend, and a worker priest, Adelfo, who know a lot about the kidnapping, intervene in the story. From them, Primo learns that his son has died. Primo, however, continues to collect the money, helped in this by his wife, to save his second creature: the factory, on the verge of bankruptcy.

Following the instructions of a false letter, written by Giovanni's girlfriend, the couple deposits the ransom money in the indicated place. The sudden reappearance of Giovanni means that in the end the billion lire is invested in the dairy, transformed into a cooperative company, under the control of the workers.

== Cast ==
- Ugo Tognazzi – Primo Spaggiari
- Anouk Aimée – Barbara Spaggiari
- Laura Morante – Laura
- Victor Cavallo – Adelfo
- Olimpia Carlisi – Romola, the palm reader
- Vittorio Caprioli – Marshal Angrisani
- Renato Salvatori – Colonel Macchi
- Ricky Tognazzi – Giovanni Spaggiari
- Gianni Migliavacca
- Margherita Chiari – Maid
- Ennio Ferrari
- Gaetano Ferrari – Guard
- Franco Trevisi
- Pietro Longari Ponzoni
- Don Backy – Crossing Keeper

== Reception ==
On the review aggregator website Rotten Tomatoes, 67% of 9 critics' reviews are positive.
