= Red Wood Pigeon =

- Directed by: Nanni Moretti
- Written by: Nanni Moretti
- Produced by: Nanni Moretti; Angelo Barbagallo
- Starring: Nanni Moretti; Silvio Orlando; Mariella Valentini
- Cinematography: Giuseppe Lanci
- Edited by: Mirco Garrone
- Music by: Nicola Piovani
- Release date: 1989
- Running time: 88 minutes
- Country: Italy
- Language: Italian

Red Wood Pigeon (Italian: Palombella rossa) is a 1989 Italian comedy drama film written, directed, produced and starred by Nanni Moretti.

The film won the Nastro d'Argento for Best Original Story.

== Plot ==
Michele Apicella, an MP for the Italian Communist Party, is involved in a car accident and consequently loses his memory. Michele is also a player for the Monteverde water polo team; he joins the team on a trip to play an important match in Sicily which will decide who wins the league, despite being uncertain of his own identity. The match lasts all day and well into the night, and throughout, Michele engages in conversations with other players, a trade unionist, the referee, a Catholic, a journalist and his daughter, in an attempt to reconstruct his sense of self. It becomes apparent that earlier in the week, he had given a momentous speech, the content of which he cannot remember. As the match drags on, the spectators and players become increasingly engrossed by the film Doctor Zhivago, which is playing on a TV screen in the bar. Michele misses a penalty and the match ends; he is left feeling disappointed not just with the match, but with life. Driving back to Rome with his daughter, he loses control of his car and the film ends with a dream-like sequence as a crowd gathers on a hill, looking up to the sun.

== Cast ==
- Nanni Moretti as Michele Apicella
- Silvio Orlando as Mario
- Mariella Valentini as the journalist
- Marco Messeri as Michele's father
- Luisanna Pandolfi as Michele's mother
- Asia Argento as Valentina
- Fabio Traversa as Michele's friend
- Raoul Ruiz as the guru
- Eugenio Masciari as the referee

== Legacy ==
In 2025, a 4K restored print was screened in the Cinéma de la Plage section of the 78th Cannes Film Festival, anticipating the film's re-release in Italian theaters by Malavida on September 3, 2025.
