= Girlfriend in a Coma =

Girlfriend in a Coma may refer to:

- "Girlfriend in a Coma" (song), a 1987 song by The Smiths
- Girlfriend in a Coma (novel), a 1998 Douglas Coupland novel, named after the song
- Girlfriend in a Coma (film), a 2012 Bill Emmott documentary film
