= Roberto Nobile =

Italian actor (1947–2022)

- Born: 11 November 1947; Verona, Italy
- Died: 30 July 2022 (aged 74); Rome, Italy
- Years active: 1986–2022

Roberto Nobile (11 November 1947 – 30 July 2022) was an Italian actor.

== Selected filmography ==
Film
Year	Title	Role	Notes
1990	Everybody's Fine (Stanno tutti bene)	Guglielmo	
1995	La scuola	Professor Mortillaro	
2000	First Light of Dawn (Prime luci dell'alba)	Nino Procida	
2001	The Son's Room (La stanza del figlio)	Priest	
2001	In Love and War	Wanda's Father	TV movie
2003	Under the Tuscan Sun	Placido	
2008	Caos calmo (Quiet Chaos)	Taramanni	
2011	We Have a Pope (Habemus Papam)	Cardinal Cevasco	
