= Cherry on the Cake =

Diamond on the Cake
- Film poster
- French: La cerise sur le gâteau
- Italian: Ciliegine
- Directed by: Laura Morante
- Written by: Daniele Costantini; Laura Morante
- Starring: Laura Morante; Isabelle Carré; Pascal Elbé
- Cinematography: Maurizio Calvesi
- Music by: Nicola Piovani
- Release date: March 2012 (Bif&st)
- Running time: 83 minutes
- Language: French
- Box office: $1.2 million

Cherry on the Cake (French: La cerise sur le gâteau, Italian: Ciliegine) is a 2012 French-Italian romantic comedy film. It marked the directorial debut of actress Laura Morante, who also co-wrote the screenplay and starred in the film. It was nominated for Nastro d'Argento for best comedy film, while Morante was nominated for David di Donatello for best new director.

== Cast ==
- Laura Morante as Amanda
- Isabelle Carré as Florence
- Pascal Elbé as Antoine
- Samir Guesmi as Maxime
- Frédéric Pierrot as Bertrand
- Patrice Thibaud as Hubert
- Louicilia Clément as Noémie
- Ennio Fantastichini as Monsieur Faysal
