= Silvio Orlando =

Italian actor (born 1957)

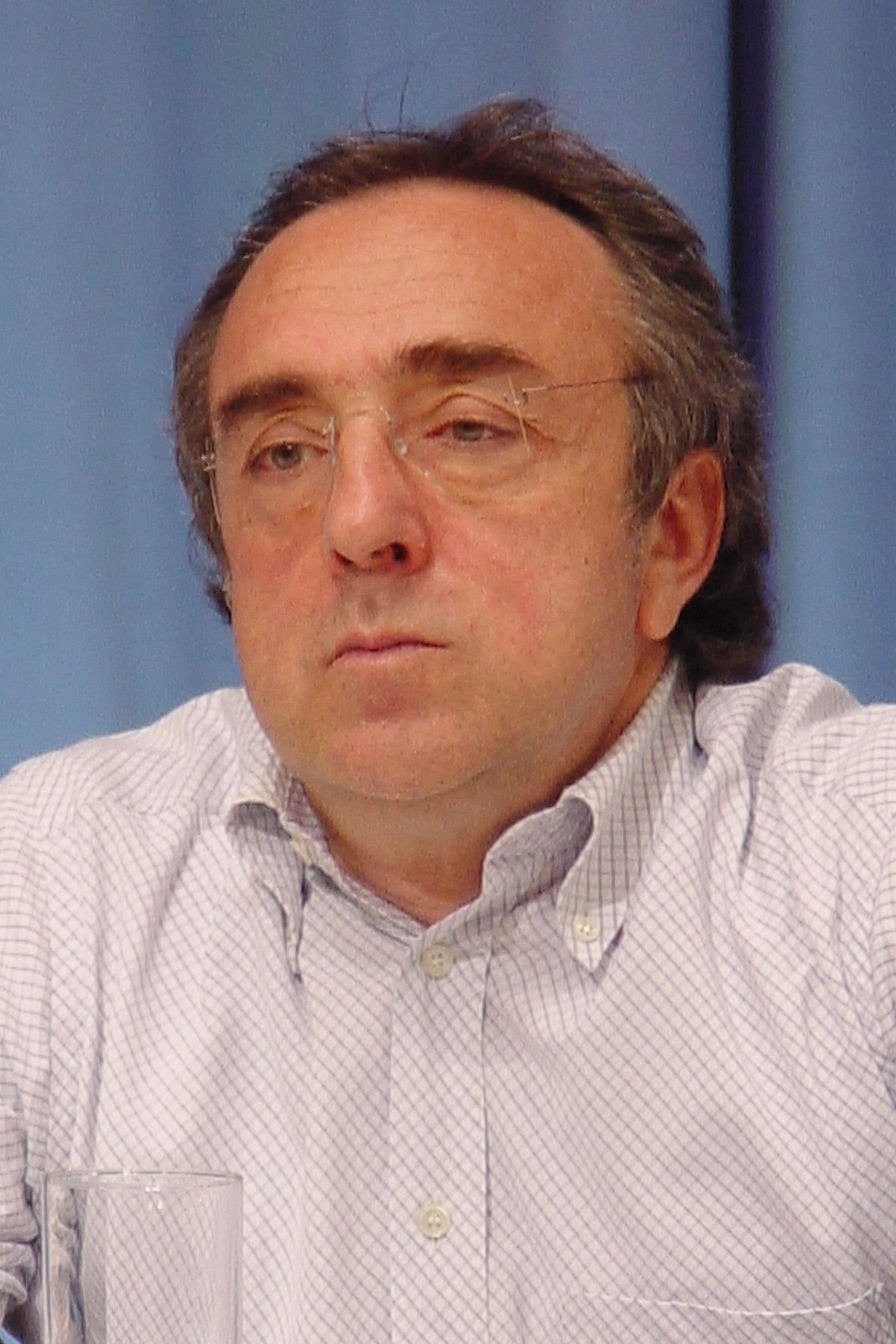
- Orlando in 2009
- Born: 30 June 1957 (age 69); Naples, Campania, Italy
- Occupation: Actor
- Years active: 1976–present
- Height: 1.60 m (5 ft 3 in)

Silvio Orlando (born 30 June 1957) is an Italian actor. Orlando was born and raised in Naples, where he started acting in theatre in 1976. He made his film debut in 1988 with a supporting role in the comedy Kamikazen: Last Night in Milan, directed by Gabriele Salvatores. Since then, he has collaborated multiple times with Salvatores, as well as more prominently with other Italian directors such as Nanni Moretti, Daniele Luchetti, and Carlo Mazzacurati.

During his career, Orlando has been nominated seven times to the David di Donatello Award for Best Actor, winning it in 2006 for his role in Moretti's The Caiman. In 2008 he won the Volpi Cup for Best Actor at the Venice Film Festival for his role in Giovanna's Father. Outside Italy, he is best known as scheming Cardinal Voiello in the internationally co-produced TV series The Young Pope (2016) and its sequel The New Pope (2020), both created by Paolo Sorrentino. In 2024 he played the role of Professor Devoto Marotta in Sorrentino's film Parthenope.

On stage, Orlando most notably directed in 1988 two plays by Peppino De Filippo, Don Rafelo 'o trombone and Cupido scherza e spazza, while in 2008 he acted in Roberto Paci Dalò's L'assedio delle ceneri. His nephew Francesco Brandi is also an actor and playwright.

== Selected filmography ==
=== Film ===
Year	Title	Role	Notes
1988	Kamikazen: Last Night in Milan	Antonio Minichino	
1989	Red Wood Pigeon	Rari Nantes Monteverde's Coach	
1990	The Week of the Sphinx	Ministro	
1990	Matilda	Torquato	
1991	The Yes Man	Luciano Sandali	Nominated — David di Donatello for Best Actor; Nominated — Nastro d'Argento for Best Actor
1992	Un'altra vita	Saverio	Nominated — David di Donatello for Best Actor
1993	The Storm Is Coming	Mario Solitudine	
1993	Sud	Ciro Ascarone	Nominated — David di Donatello for Best Actor
1995	La scuola	Professor Vivaldi	Nominated — Nastro d'Argento for Best Actor
1996	Bits and Pieces		
1996	August Vacation	Sandro Molino	Nominated — Nastro d'Argento for Best Actor
1996	We Free Kings	Melchiorre	
1996	My Generation	Captain	
1996	Vesna Goes Fast	Insurance Agent	
1996	Intolerance		Segment: "Arrivano i sandali"
1997	Nirvana	Indian Caretaker	
1997	Auguri professore	Professor Vincenzo Lipari	Nominated — David di Donatello for Best Actor; Nominated — Nastro d'Argento for Best Actor
1998	Children of Hannibal	Domenico	
1998	The Dust of Naples	Ciriaco / Ciarli	
1998	April	Himself	David di Donatello for Best Supporting Actor; Nominated — Nastro d'Argento for Best Supporting Actor
1999	Fuori dal mondo	Ernesto	Nominated — David di Donatello for Best Actor
2000	I Prefer the Sound of the Sea	Luigi	Nominated — Nastro d'Argento for Best Actor
2001	The Son's Room	Oscar	Nominated — David di Donatello for Best Supporting Actor; Nominated — Nastro d'Argento for Best Supporting Actor
2001	Light of My Eyes	Saverio Donati	Nominated — David di Donatello for Best Supporting Actor
2002	Bear's Kiss	The Ringmaster	
2002	El Alamein: The Line of Fire	General	
2002	The Council of Egypt	Giuseppe Vella	
2003	The Soul's Place	Antonio 'Tonino'	
2003	Opopomoz	Peppino (voice)	
2004	After Midnight	Narrator (voice)	
2006	The Caiman	Bruno Bonomo	David di Donatello for Best Actor; Nastro d'Argento for Best Actor; Nominated — European Film Award for Best Actor
2008	Quiet Chaos	Samuele	
2008	Giovanna's Father	Michele Casali	Volpi Cup for Best Actor; Nominated — David di Donatello for Best Actor; Nominated — Nastro d'Argento for Best Actor
2008	La fabbrica dei tedeschi	Father	Documentary
2009	Many Kisses Later	Luca	Nominated — Nastro d'Argento for Best Supporting Actor
2009	The Big Dream	Police Captain	
2010	Parents and Children: Shake Well Before Using	Gianni	
2010	La Passione	Gianni Dubois	
2011	Missione di pace	Captain Sandro Vinciguerra	
2013	A Castle in Italy	Italian Mayor	
2013	The Human Factor	Inspector Adriano Monaco	
2013	The Chair of Happiness	Seller of Paintings on TV	
2016	Un paese quasi perfetto	Domenico Buonocore	
2020	The Ties	Old Aldo	Nominated — David di Donatello for Best Supporting Actor
2021	The Hidden Child	Prof. Gabriele Santoro	Nastro d'Argento for Best Actor
2021	The Inner Cage	Carmine Lagioia	David di Donatello for Best Actor; Nastro d'Argento for Best Actor
2022	Dry	Antonio	
2023	A Brighter Tomorrow	Ennio	
2024	Another Summer Holiday	Sandro Molino	
2024	Parthenope	Prof. Devoto Marotta	
2026	God Laughs	Cardinal Vincenzo Maculani	

=== Television ===
Year	Title	Role	Notes
1988	Zanzibar	Domenico Tagliuti	40 episodes
1992	Vicini di casa	Orlando Bauscia	
1993	Felipe ha gli occhi azzurri	Police Chief	1 episode
1994	Michele alla guerra	Michele	Television film
1999	La vita che verrà	Nicola	Television miniseries; 2 episodes
2005	Padri e figli	Francesco Patrizi	Television miniseries; 6 episodes
2011	Il delitto di Via Poma	Inspector Montella	Television film
2012	Un Natale con i fiocchi	Lino Fiocchi	Television film
2013	Il nipote di Rameau		Television film Also screenplay
2016	The Young Pope	Cardinal Angelo Voiello	10 episodes
2020	The New Pope	Cardinal Angelo Voiello / Cardinal Hernández	9 episodes
