= I Am Self Sufficient =

1976 film

- Film poster
- Directed by: Nanni Moretti
- Written by: Nanni Moretti
- Produced by: Nanni Moretti
- Starring: Nanni Moretti
- Cinematography: Fabio Sposini
- Edited by: Nanni Moretti
- Music by: Franco Piersanti
- Release date: 1976
- Running time: 95 minutes
- Country: Italy
- Language: Italian

I Am Self Sufficient (Italian: Io sono un autarchico) is a 1976 Italian comedy film directed by and starring Nanni Moretti.

== Cast ==
- Nanni Moretti as Michele Apicella
- Simona Frosi as Simona
- Fabio Traversa as Fabio
- Luciano Agati as Giuseppe
- Franco Moretti as the buddhist
