= The Caiman =

2006 film

- Directed by: Nanni Moretti
- Written by: Nanni Moretti; Heindrun Schleef; Federica Pontremoli; Francesco Piccolo
- Produced by: Angelo Barbagallo
- Starring: Silvio Orlando; Margherita Buy; Jasmine Trinca; Michele Placido; Giuliano Montaldo; Nanni Moretti
- Cinematography: Arnaldo Catinari
- Music by: Franco Piersanti
- Distributed by: Sacher Film
- Release date: March 24, 2006
- Running time: 112 minutes
- Country: Italy
- Language: Italian
- Box office: $10,369,396

The Caiman (Italian: Il caimano, referring to the caiman) is a 2006 Italian satirical comedy-drama film directed by Nanni Moretti and starring Silvio Orlando and Margherita Buy. Focusing on Silvio Berlusconi's vicissitudes, it was released just before the beginning of the 2006 elections, in which Berlusconi lost. It was one of the most successful films of 2006 in Italy. It was entered into the 2006 Cannes Film Festival.

== Plot ==
Opening with a wedding between two young Communists, officiated by a CP functionary, under the poster of Mao-Tse Tung, the bride suddenly spears the man and escapes, chased by the police. This is the end of 'Cataratte'/'Cataracts', a 10-year-old action B-movie projected in an open-air cinema in honor of Bruno Bonomo (Silvio Orlando), a cockeyed film producer, who did some trash movies starring his wife Paola (Margherita Buy) in the 1970s. He also has two young sons loved by him and his wife. During this homage, a young woman presents him the script of a movie she wants to direct with his help.

Slated to start on a project celebrating the return voyage of Columbus just after his discovery of America, Bruno is stunned when his director, Franco Caspio, quits because of the low budget. Suddenly Bruno has no projects, no financing and no leverage.

Added to his many troubles, Bruno's wife asks for a separation even though they have two sons. She wants to pursue her artistic options.

Bruno reads the offered script and realizes that it's a thinly disguised account of Silvio Berlusconi, the Italian media magnate who promoted his political career through his TV stations. Knowing this could draw political and legal heat, not to mention difficulty for finding funding; but the young woman convinces Bruno to start production on The Caiman. The film shows how secret money, slush funds and Swiss bank accounts start Il Caimano's career as a big building developer. She hopes that the film will influence voters in the elections slated for 2006.

Musing a love relationship with the writer, Bruno meets her lesbian partner and her son 'made' in a 'journey' to the Netherlands.

The production of the film is rife with problems, including the defection of the main actor Marco Pulici (Michele Placido), but the plot of The Caiman also deals with the domestic issues between Bonomo and Paola until their final separation, with the compromises made for their two sons.

Despite growing evidence that his film will never be completed, Bonomo decides to shoot the last scene, which shows the political nucleus behind the film: in it, Silvio Berlusconi (played by Nanni Moretti himself) enters the tribunal room to hear the ruling against him (see Legal investigations of Berlusconi), which sentences him to seven years of jail. Notwithstanding the sentence, Berlusconi/Moretti exits the tribunal while a crowd throws debris at the judges, including a Molotov cocktail.

The whole, crude scene is not only an allusion to Berlusconi's judiciary controversies, but also to his powerful ability to communicate, which (in Moretti's view) led Italian people to support him anyway despite his controversial past.

== Cast ==
- Silvio Orlando as Bruno Bonomo
- Margherita Buy as Paola Bonomo / Aidra
- Jasmine Trinca as Teresa
- Michele Placido as Marco Pulici / Silvio Berlusconi
- Nanni Moretti as Himself / Silvio Berlusconi
- Giuliano Montaldo as Franco Caspio
- Antonello Grimaldi as Direttore di Produzione
- Paolo Sorrentino as Marito di Aidra
- Elio De Capitani as Silvio Berlusconi
- Tatti Sanguineti as Beppe Savonese
- Jerzy Stuhr as Jerzy Sturovsky
- Toni Bertorelli as Indro Montanelli
- Matteo Garrone as Direttore della fotografia
- Lorenzo Alessandri as Aiuto regista
- Giancarlo Basili as Fritz Simmons, lo scenografo
- Anna Bonaiuto as Pubblico Ministero

Numerous Italian film makers play minor parts in the film. These include Paolo Sorrentino, Giuliano Montaldo, Carlo Mazzacurati, Tatti Sanguinetti, Paolo Virzì and Antonello Grimaldi while actor and director Michele Placido is one of the main characters.

== Sources ==
- La condanna di Silvio Berlusconi. Morte politica e civile del Caimano. La sentenza Mediaset, Marianna Fo ed., 2013.
