= Sweet Body of Bianca =

- Directed by: Nanni Moretti
- Written by: Nanni Moretti; Sandro Petraglia
- Starring: Nanni Moretti; Laura Morante
- Cinematography: Luciano Tovoli
- Music by: Franco Piersanti
- Production company: FasoFilm/ReteItalia
- Release date: 1984
- Running time: 96 minutes
- Language: Italian

Sweet Body of Bianca (Italian: Bianca) is a 1984 Italian mystery film directed by Nanni Moretti.

== Plot ==
In Rome, Michele Apicella moves to a new apartment and starts a new job as mathematics teacher in the experimental Marilyn Monroe high school where most of the staff are, like him, eccentric. A solitary man, scrupulous about his work, one of his obsessions is the life of his new neighbours. He befriends a young couple, Maximilian and Aurora, but is deeply upset when he sees the girl with another man. She is found dead and the police inspector, thinking that Michele may know more than he reveals, puts him under surveillance.

An attractive new teacher, Bianca, arrives at the school and the two show interest in each other. She is living with a man, but decides to leave him and move in with Michele. While he is overjoyed to have the love of a beautiful and affectionate young woman, he is afraid that this perfection will not last and that like so many other couples he knows they will fall out.

One couple he is upset by are Ignazio and Maria who, despite his efforts to reconcile them, are breaking up. When they are both murdered, the police inspector arrests Michele as a suspect, but he is freed when Bianca gives him a false alibi. He then breaks with Bianca, telling her it is better to part while they are happy and, once on his own, his already fragile mental equilibrium crumbles. The film ends with his rambling confession to the patient inspector over how the dead neighbour and friends had disappointed him and upset his need for order in life.

== Themes in Moretti's other works ==
"Michele Apicella" is the nom-de-plume used by Nanni Moretti for his roles in all his films (except The Mass Is Ended (1985)) until Palombella rossa of 1989. Another recurrent theme of Moretti's films, the Sacher torte, is also present in Bianca.

== Production ==
Songs in the film include "Insieme a te non ci sto più" (sung by Caterina Caselli), "Il cielo in una stanza" by Gino Paoli and "Scalo a Grado" by Franco Battiato.

The school psychologist is played by Luigi Moretti, Nanni's father.

In the Marilyn Monroe school, the traditional portraits of the President of the Italian Republic in the rooms are replaced by that of football goalkeeper Dino Zoff.

== See also ==
- List of Italian films of 1984
