= Victory March (film) =

- Directed by: Marco Bellocchio
- Written by: Marco Bellocchio; Sergio Bazzini
- Starring: Franco Nero; Michele Placido; Miou-Miou
- Cinematography: Franco Di Giacomo
- Edited by: Sergio Montanari
- Music by: Nicola Piovani
- Release date: 1976
- Country: Italy
- Language: Italian

Marcia trionfale (internationally released as Victory March) is a 1976 Italian drama film written and directed by Marco Bellocchio. It was coproduced by France (where it was released as La Marche triomphale) and West Germany (where is known as Triumphmarsch). For this film Michele Placido was awarded with a Nastro d'Argento for best actor and with a special David di Donatello. It was shot in a disused barracks in Reggio Emilia.

== Cast ==
- Franco Nero: Captain Asciutto
- Michele Placido: Paolo Passeri
- Miou-Miou: Rosanna
- Patrick Dewaere: Lt. Baio
- Nino Bignamini: Guancia
- Alessandro Haber: Belluomo
- Peter Berling
- Ekkehardt Belle
- Gisela Hahn

== See also ==
- List of Italian films of 1976
