= The Son's Room =

2001 film by Nanni Moretti

- Original film poster
- Italian: La stanza del figlio
- Directed by: Nanni Moretti
- Written by: Nanni Moretti
- Produced by: Angelo Barbagallo; Nanni Moretti
- Starring: Nanni Moretti; Laura Morante; Jasmine Trinca; Giuseppe Sanfelice; Silvio Orlando; Stefano Accorsi; Claudia Della Seta
- Cinematography: Giuseppe Lanci
- Edited by: Esmeralda Calabria
- Music by: Nicola Piovani
- Distributed by: Sacher Film
- Release date: 9 March 2001 (Italy)
- Running time: 99 minutes
- Country: Italy
- Language: Italian
- Box office: $11.8 million

The Son's Room (Italian: La stanza del figlio) is a 2001 Italian drama film directed, written and produced by Nanni Moretti. It depicts the psychological effects on a family and their life after the death of their son. It was filmed in and around the city of Ancona, with a cast led by Moretti, Laura Morante and Jasmine Trinca.

The film competed at the 2001 Cannes Film Festival and received positive reviews. It won numerous awards, including the Palme d'Or and the David di Donatello for Best Film. Although selected as the Italian entry for the Best Foreign Language Film at the 74th Academy Awards, it was not nominated.

== Plot ==
In Ancona, Giovanni is a therapist whose 17-year-old son, Andrea, is accused of stealing a rare ammonite fossil from his school. Andrea is suspended and protests his innocence. However, he later confesses to his mother, Paola, that he and his friend stole it as a prank and intended to return it before it broke.

Giovanni and Andrea make plans to go jogging together, but Giovanni is called to the distant home of a patient who is severely distressed about a possible cancer diagnosis. Instead, Andrea goes scuba diving with a friend and swims into an underwater cave, where he accidentally drowns. Giovanni, Paola, and their daughter Irene are left to mourn.

Giovanni investigates the diving equipment model and becomes suspicious that Andrea's was defective. However, Paola reminds him that the verdict was that it was functioning properly. Giovanni, once a distant observer of his patients' struggles, begins having difficulty analyzing them, particularly the one he went to see on the day Andrea died, against whom he shows signs of impatience and hostility.

One day, Paola receives a love letter sent to Andrea by a girl named Arianna, whom he had met at a camp. The family does not know Arianna and never knew Andrea had a girlfriend. They realize she does not know Andrea has died and attempt to contact her, eventually inviting her to their home.

Giovanni stops by a music store to buy an album, ostensibly for a friend of Andrea, but more for Andrea. A clerk gives him a Brian Eno album. Arianna arrives on her way to a destination and sees Andrea's bedroom. She shows Giovanni photographs Andrea sent her of himself in his room, some of which are very amusing. The family welcomes Arianna and offers to host her in their home, but she informs them she is hitchhiking with her friend Stefano to spend vacation in France.

The family offers Arianna and Stefano a short ride, but it lingers to a point where they drive into the night and reach Menton, on the border between Italy and France. Bidding Arianna and Stefano goodbye, the family watches their bus leave Italy and wanders on the beach as a new life awaits them.

== Cast ==
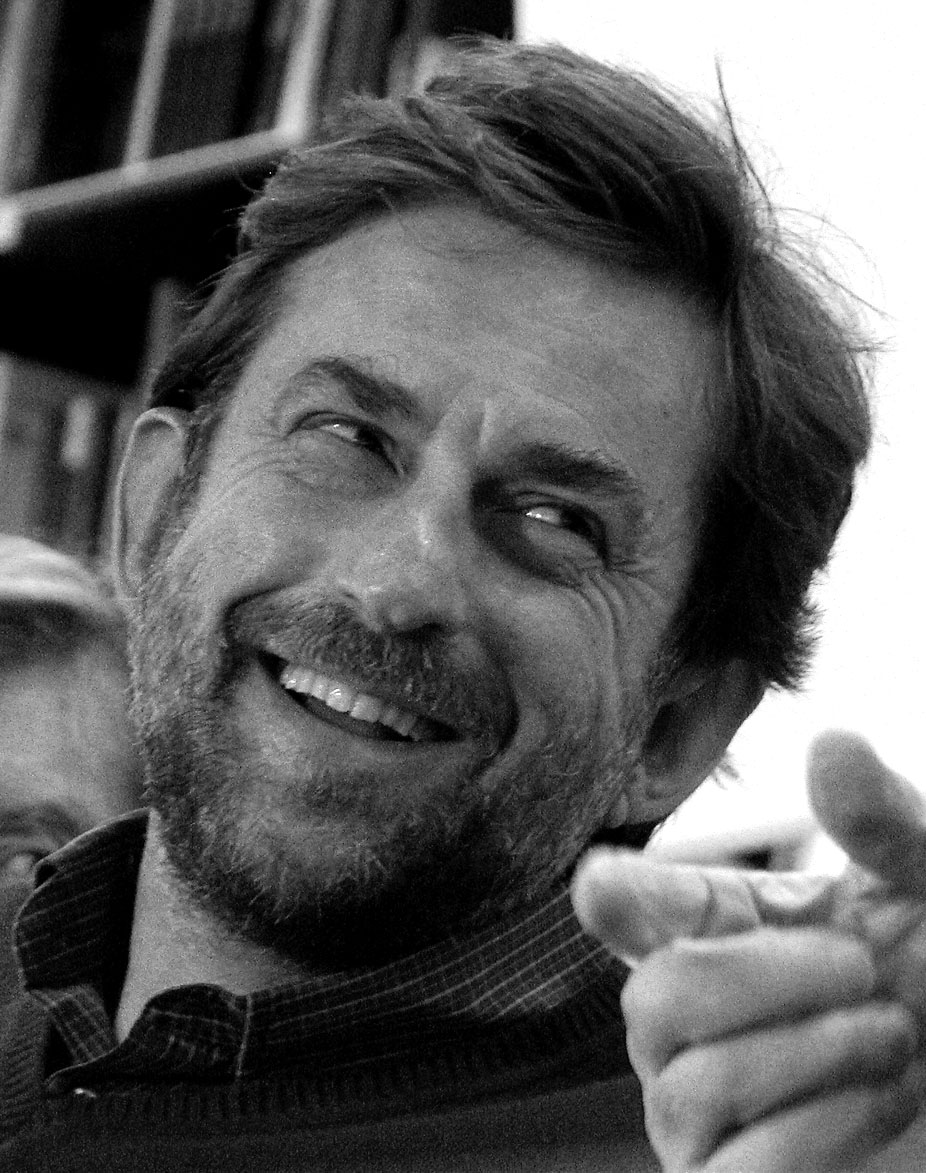
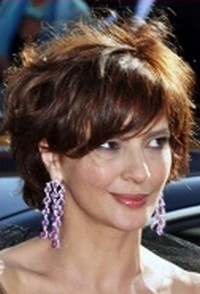
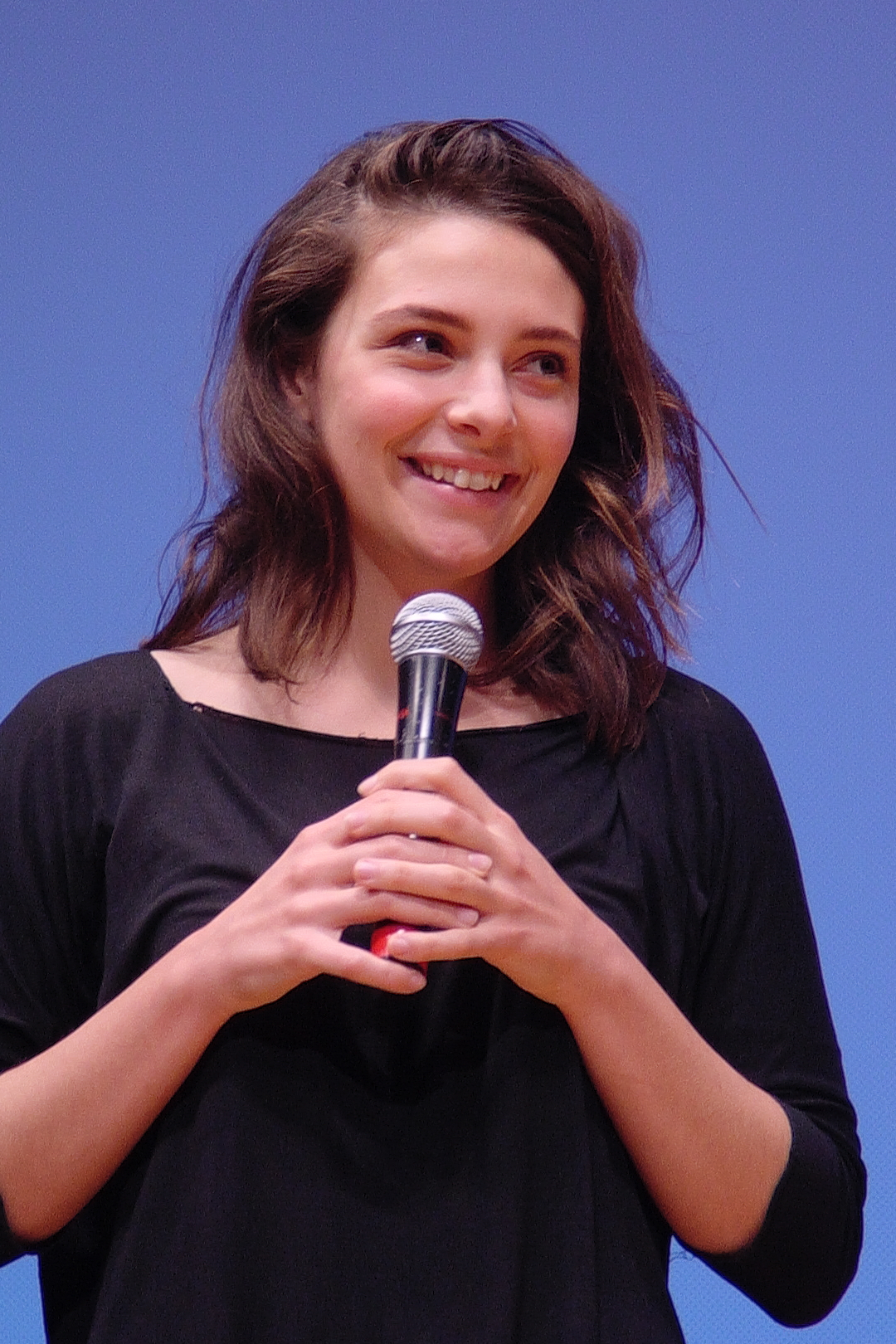
Nanni Moretti, Laura Morante and Jasmine Trinca star as the bereaved family.
- Nanni Moretti as Giovanni
- Laura Morante as Paola
- Jasmine Trinca as Irene
- Giuseppe Sanfelice as Andrea
- Sofia Vigliar as Arianna
- Silvio Orlando as Oscar
- Stefano Accorsi as Tommaso
- Renato Scarpa as Headmaster
- Roberto Nobile as Priest
- Paolo De Vita as Luciano's father
- Roberto De Francesco as record store clerk
- Claudio Santamaria as dive shop clerk
- Antonio Petrocelli as Enrico
- Lorenzo Alessandri as Filippo's father
- Alessandro Infusini as Matteo
- Silvia Bonucci as Carla
- Marcello Bernacchini as Luciano

== Production ==
Italian director Nanni Moretti first developed the idea for The Son's Room out of a longtime interest to write about a psychoanalyst and play one. He came up with the story when he learned his wife was pregnant with a boy.

Cinematographer Giuseppe Lanci said they opted to shoot in Ancona, looking for a sea and port and deciding against Genoa for its large size and Trieste for its distractingly beautiful buildings. Filming was suspended for three months, mid schedule, due to Moretti's illness. In addition, the crew's contracts expired, and everything was interrupted by a strike action and Christmas break.

== Reception ==
=== Box office ===
The film grossed $5.5 million in Italy and $11.8 million worldwide.

=== Critical response ===
The film received positive reviews, with Rotten Tomatoes measuring an 85% approval rating based on 85 reviews, with an average rating of 7.3/10. The website's critical consensus reads, "The Son's Room is a moving and contemplative study of grief." On Metacritic, the film has a weighted average score of 73 out of 100, based on 34 critics, indicating "generally favorable reviews".

Peter Bradshaw of The Guardian said "this affecting and beautiful film really is a very accomplished piece of work from Moretti, superbly acted, refreshingly direct and blessed with an ingenious, unexpected final act." Roger Ebert gave it three and a half stars, writing, "Sometimes in a quite ordinary way a director can reach out and touch us." Stephen Holden of The New York Times assessed it as touching, drawing a parallel to the September 11 attacks that year, which showed how sudden tragedy devastates the living. Holden opined the film was not very creative but featured solid acting. David Rooney of Variety called it "a delicate drama of pain and grief," criticizing Moretti's performance as overly self-conscious but praising Morante as "deeply moving." Meredith Brody of The Chicago Reader said the film demonstrated "tender skill." Time Out praised it as "Subtle, psychologically astute and engagingly unassertive in tone," concluding it is "A gem." Michael Wilmington of The Chicago Tribune called the film "moving."

The film appears in Empire's 2008 list of the 500 greatest movies of all time at number 480. Peter Bradshaw of The Guardian, included the film in its list of ten 'Best films of the noughties' (2000-2009).

=== Accolades ===
The Son's Room was the winner of the Palme d'Or at the 2001 Cannes Film Festival, noted for being the first Italian film to win the highest Cannes honour in over 20 years. The film was Italy's submission to the Academy Award for Best Foreign Language Film, but it was not nominated.

Award	Date of ceremony	Category	Recipient(s)	Result	Ref(s)
Cannes Film Festival	14 – 25 May 2001	Palme d'Or	Nanni Moretti	Won	
Cannes Film Festival	14 – 25 May 2001	FIPRESCI Prize	Nanni Moretti	Won	
César Awards	2 March 2002	Best Foreign Film	Nanni Moretti	Nominated	
David di Donatello Awards	10 April 2001	Best Film	Nanni Moretti	Won	
David di Donatello Awards	10 April 2001	Best Director	Nanni Moretti	Nominated	
David di Donatello Awards	10 April 2001	Best Producer	Angelo Barbagallo and Nanni Moretti	Nominated	
David di Donatello Awards	10 April 2001	Best Script	Linda Ferri, Nanni Moretti and Heidrun Schleef	Nominated	
David di Donatello Awards	10 April 2001	Best Actor	Nanni Moretti	Nominated	
David di Donatello Awards	10 April 2001	Best Actress	Laura Morante	Won	
David di Donatello Awards	10 April 2001	Best Supporting Actor	Silvio Orlando	Nominated	
David di Donatello Awards	10 April 2001	Best Supporting Actress	Jasmine Trinca	Nominated	
David di Donatello Awards	10 April 2001	Best Production Design	Giancarlo Basili	Nominated	
David di Donatello Awards	10 April 2001	Best Editing	Esmeralda Calabria	Nominated	
David di Donatello Awards	10 April 2001	Best Score	Nicola Piovani	Won	
David di Donatello Awards	10 April 2001	Best Sound	Alessandro Zanon	Nominated	
European Film Awards	1 December 2001	Best Film	Angelo Barbagallo and Nanni Moretti	Nominated	
European Film Awards	1 December 2001	Best Actress	Laura Morante	Nominated	
Nastro d'Argento	2001	Silver Ribbon	Nanni Moretti	Won	
Nastro d'Argento	2001	Guglielmo Biraghi Award	Jasmine Trinca	Won	

== See also ==
- List of submissions to the 74th Academy Awards for Best Foreign Language Film
- List of Italian submissions for the Academy Award for Best Foreign Language Film
