= The Mass Is Ended =

- Directed by: Nanni Moretti
- Written by: Nanni Moretti; Sandro Petraglia
- Produced by: Achille Manzotti
- Starring: Nanni Moretti
- Cinematography: Franco Di Giacomo
- Edited by: Mirco Garrone
- Music by: Nicola Piovani
- Release date: 15 November 1985
- Running time: 94 minutes
- Country: Italy
- Language: Italian

The Mass Is Ended (Italian: La messa è finita) is a 1985 Italian drama film, written, starring and directed by Nanni Moretti.

== Plot ==
The young priest Father Giulio returns to Rome, his hometown, after a long pilgrimage. Don Giulio hopes to live peacefully with his family and his friends, but discovers that many of them are depressed or frustrated, some of them suicidally so. Father Giulio determines to leave again, but his parents convince him to perform the wedding ceremony for his friend Caesar and his fiancée. Don Giulio rushes through the ceremony and then away from Rome. Once away from the city, he immediately regains happiness.

== Cast ==
- Nanni Moretti: don Giulio
- Marco Messeri: Saverio
- Ferruccio De Ceresa: Giulio's father
- Enrica Maria Modugno: Valentina, Giulio's sister
- Eugenio Masciari: Eugenio
- Luisa De Santis: Luisa De Santis, Eugenio's wife
- Margarita Lozano: Giulio's mother
- Roberto Vezzosi: Cesare
- Vincenzo Salemme: Andrea
- Dario Cantarelli: Gianni
- Mauro Fabretti: Simone
- Giovanni Buttafava: a lawyer

== Accolades ==
- 36th Berlin International Film Festival: Silver Bear – Special Jury Prize, OCIC Award
