= Franco Piersanti =

Italian composer and conductor

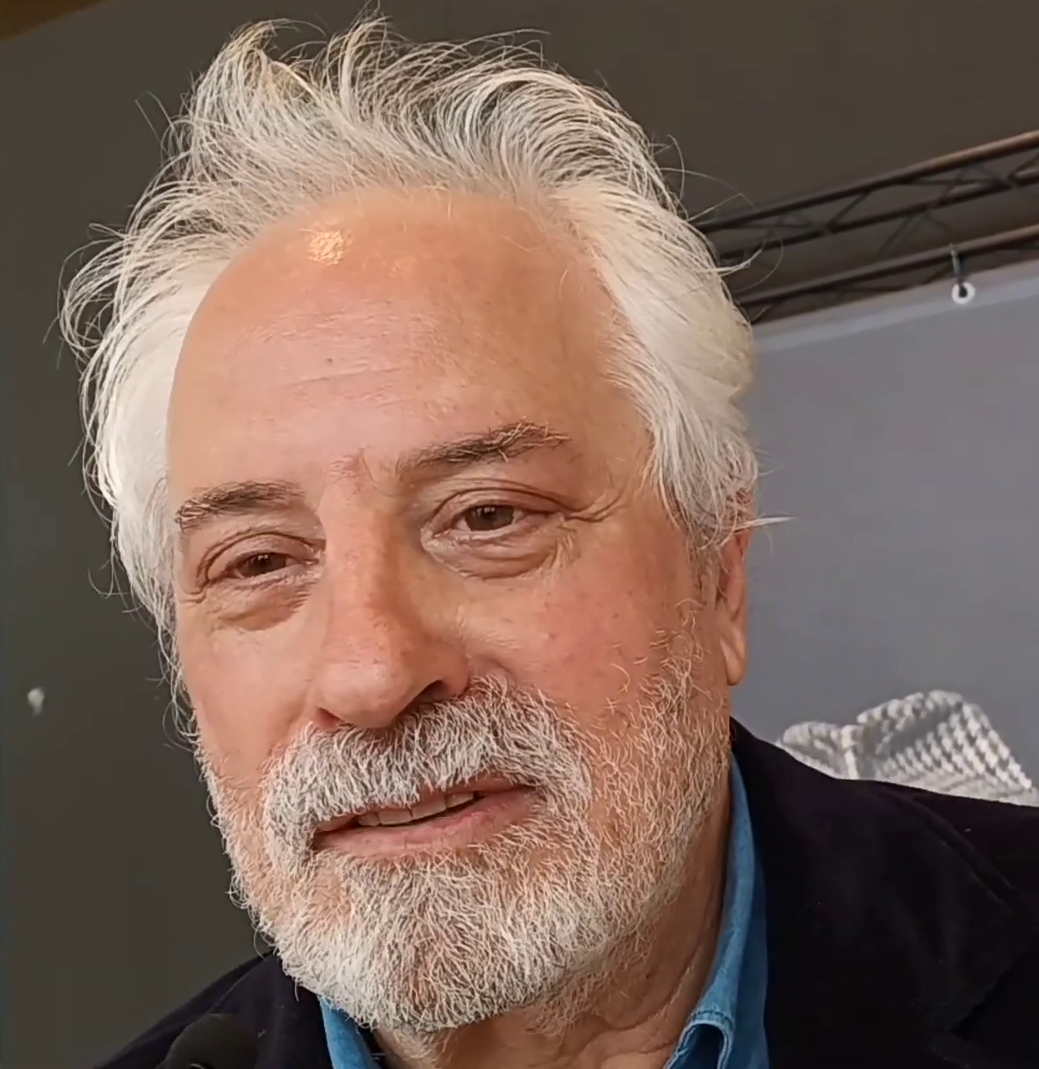
- Piersanti at the 2023 Bari International Film Festival
- Born: 12 January 1950 (age 76); Rome, Italy

Franco Piersanti (born 12 January 1950) is an Italian composer and conductor.

Born in Rome, Piersanti graduated in double bass at the Santa Cecilia Conservatory, where he studied composition under the guidance of Armando Renzi and conducting under Franco Ferrara and Piero Bellugi. He later played bass in the RAI Symphony Orchestra.

During his studies he knew the composer Nino Rota, and he became his assistant between 1975 and 1977. In 1976 he debuted as film composer scoring the Nanni Moretti's first film, Io sono un autarchico and then started a long collaboration with him that continued with Moretti's Habemus Papam (2011).

Piersanti is also well known for his long collaboration with the director Gianni Amelio, for whom he scored seven movies between 1982 and 2006, including The Stolen Children (1992) and Lamerica (1994), for which he won two David di Donatello for Best Score.

His soundtracks include Love and Fear (1988), The Second Time (1995), Inspector Montalbano (1999), The Best Day of My Life (2002), The Beast in the Heart (2005), My Brother is an Only Child (2007) and Fort Apache Napoli (2009).
