= Nanni Moretti =

Italian screenwriter, film director, and actor

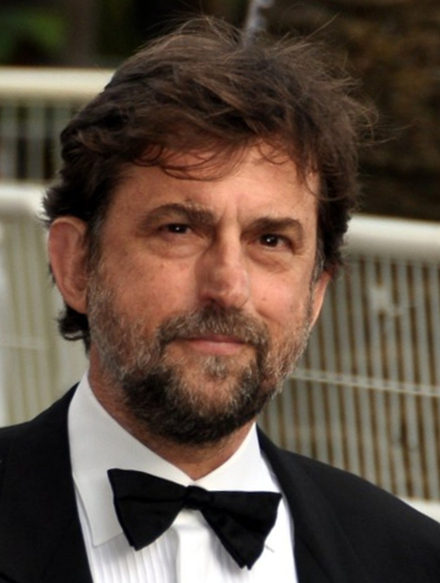
- Moretti at the 2011 Cannes Film Festival
- Born: Giovanni Moretti; 19 August 1953 (age 73); Bruneck, South Tyrol, Italy
- Occupations: Actor; film director; screenwriter; producer
- Years active: 1976–present

Giovanni "Nanni" Moretti (Italian pronunciation: [ˈnanni moˈretti]; born 19 August 1953) is an Italian filmmaker, actor and producer. He is most known for his Palme d'Or winner film The Son's Room (2001) and his Special Jury Prize winner film Sweet Dreams (1981). He is also the recipient of three David di Donatello Award for Best Film, for: Caro diario in 1994, The Son's Room in 2001, and The Caiman in 2006.

== Early life ==
Moretti was born in Bruneck, Italy, to Roman parents who were both teachers. His father was the late epigraphist Luigi Moretti, a Greek teacher at Sapienza University of Rome. His brother is literary scholar Franco Moretti.

== Career ==
While growing up, Moretti discovered his two passions, the cinema and water polo. Having finished his studies, he pursued a career as a producer, and in 1973 directed his first two short films: Pâté de bourgeois and The Defeat (La sconfitta).

In 1976, Nanni Moretti's first feature film Io sono un autarchico (I Am Self-Sufficient) was released. In 1978, he wrote, directed and starred in the movie Ecce Bombo, which tells the story of a student having problems with his entourage. It was screened at the Cannes Festival. Sogni d'oro won the Special Jury Prize at the 38th Venice International Film Festival. La messa è finita won the Silver Bear – Special Jury Prize at the 36th Berlin International Film Festival.

Having played water polo in the B division of the Italian championship, his experience later inspired his 1989 film Red Wood Pigeon ("palombella," which literally means "little pigeon," refers to a type of lob shot). He may be best known for his films Caro diario (1993; followed in 1998 by a sequel, Aprile) and La stanza del figlio (The Son's Room, 2001), the latter of which won the Palme d'Or at the 2001 Cannes Film Festival.

The Caiman (2006) is in part about Berlusconi's controversies: in one of the three portraits of the Italian prime minister Moretti himself plays Berlusconi. His 2011 film We Have a Pope screened In Competition at the 2011 Cannes Film Festival, follows the conclave election of new Pope.

His 2015 film Mia Madre was selected to compete for the Palme d'Or at the 2015 Cannes Film Festival, and won the Prize of the Ecumenical Jury. His 2021 and 2023 films Three Floors and A Brighter Tomorrow were also selected to compete for the Palme d'Or at the 2021 and 2023 Cannes Film Festival.

Moretti has used certain actors several times in his films, generally playing minor roles. His father Luigi appears in 6 films, Dario Cantarelli and Mauro Fabretti in 5, and Antonio Petrocelli in 4. More notable Italian actors he has employed frequently in his films include Silvio Orlando, who appears in 5 films (including the role of protagonist in Il caimano) and Laura Morante, who was featured in Sogni d'oro, Bianca and The Son's Room.

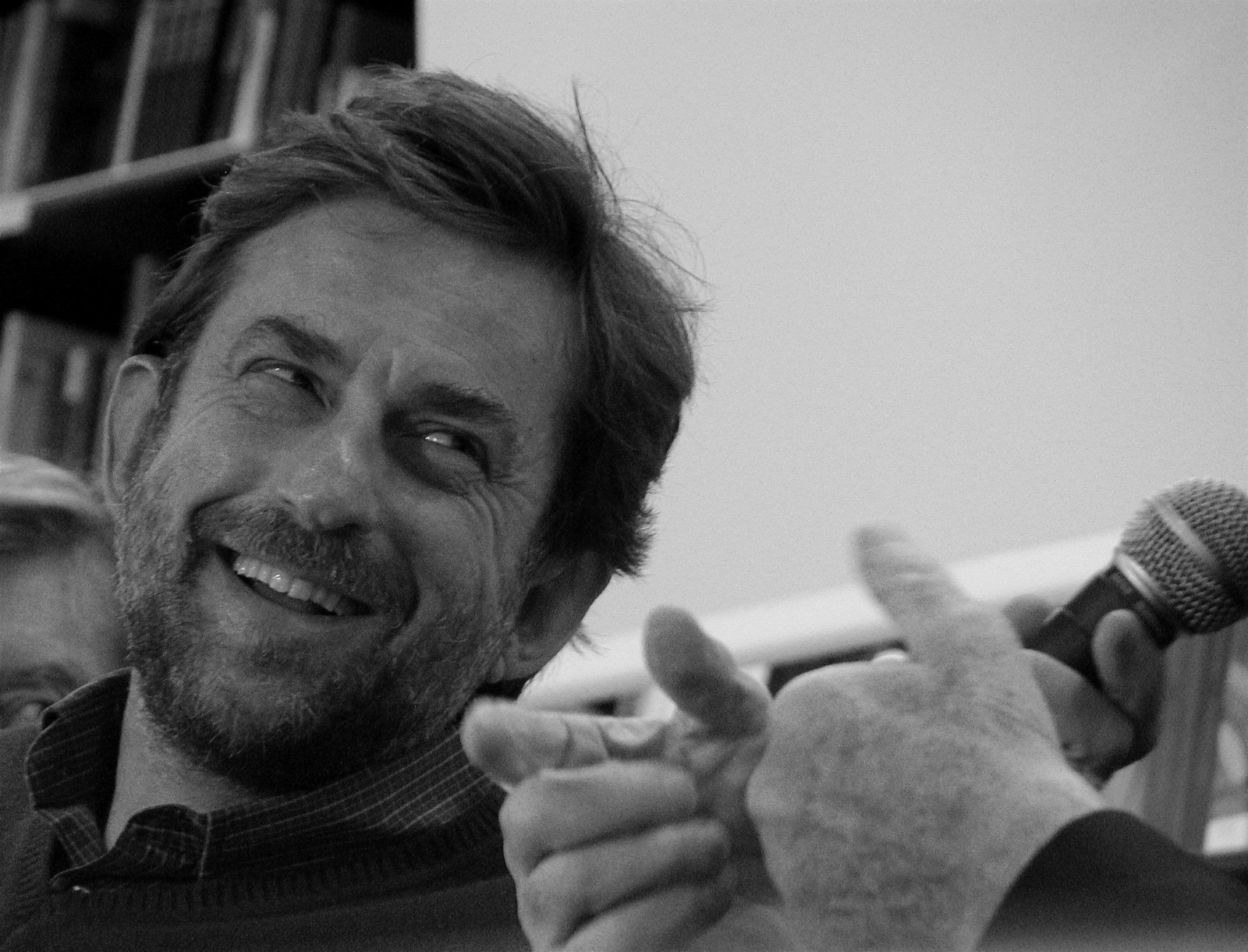
Moretti in 2007

== Personal life ==
Even though his works have not been widely seen outside Europe, within his country, Moretti is known as a maker of wryly humorous and eccentric films, usually starring himself. Moretti says he is not religious. In his own words: "I remember the shirts that said 'Thank God I'm an atheist'. Funny. But I do not think so. I'm not a believer and I'm sorry."

Moretti is a famous outspoken political leftist in Italian politics. In 2002, he organized street protests against the government of Silvio Berlusconi, besides his own documentary film The Thing (La cosa), which follows the first meeting of Italian leftist militants after the Italian Communist Party's dissolution proposal in 1989.

Moretti lives in Rome, having been resident since birth, where he is co-owner of a small movie theater, Nuovo Sacher, named like this because of Moretti's passion for Sachertorte. The short film, Il Giorno della prima di Close Up (Opening Day of Close-Up, 1996), shows Moretti at his theatre attempting to encourage patrons to attend the opening day of Abbas Kiarostami's film, Close Up.

In April 2025, Moretti was hospitalised after suffering a heart attack.

== Filmography ==
Year	Title	Credited as				Role	Notes
Year	Title	Actor	Director	Writer	Producer	Role	Notes
1973	La sconfitta	Yes	Yes	Yes	Yes	Luciano	Short film
1973	Paté de bourgeois	Yes	Yes	Yes	Yes	Boy with Camera	Short film
1974	Come parli frate?	Yes	Yes	Yes	Yes	Don Rodrigo	
1976	I Am Self Sufficient	Yes	Yes	Yes	Yes	Michele Apicella	
1977	Padre Padrone	Yes	No	No	No	Cesare	
1978	Ecce bombo	Yes	Yes	Yes	No	Michele Apicella	
1981	Sweet Dreams	Yes	Yes	Yes	Yes	Michele Apicella	Special Jury Prize at the 38th Venice International Film Festival
1984	Sweet Body of Bianca	Yes	Yes	Yes	No	Michele Apicella	
1985	The Mass Is Ended	Yes	Yes	Yes	No	Don Giulio	Special Jury Prize at the 36th Berlin International Film Festival
1987	Italian Night	No	No	No	Yes	None	
1988	It's Happening Tomorrow	No	No	No	Yes	None	
1989	Red Wood Pigeon	Yes	Yes	Yes	Yes	Michele Apicella	
1990	La cosa	No	Yes	Yes	Yes	None	Documentary film
1991	The Yes Man	Yes	No	No	Yes	Cesare Botero	
1993	Caro diario	Yes	Yes	Yes	Yes	Himself	Best Director at the 1994 Cannes Film Festival
1994	L'unico paese al mondo	No	Yes	No	No	None	Short film
1995	The Second Time	Yes	No	No	Yes	Alberto Sajevo	
1996	Opening Day of Close-Up	No	Yes	Yes	No	None	Short film
1996	Three Lives and Only One Death	Yes	No	No	No	Barman	Cameo appearance
1998	April	Yes	Yes	Yes	Yes	Himself	
2001	The Son's Room	Yes	Yes	Yes	Yes	Giovanni	
2001–2002	I diari della Sacher	No	No	No	Yes	None	Docuseries
2003	People of Rome	Yes	No	No	No	Himself	Uncredited
2003	The Last Customer	No	Yes	No	Yes	None	Short film
2003	Il grido d'angoscia dell'uccello predatore (20 tagli d'Aprile)	Yes	Yes	Yes	Yes	Himself	Short film
2004	I Can See It in Your Eyes	Yes	No	No	Yes	Client	Cameo appearance
2006	The Caiman	Yes	Yes	Yes	Yes	Himself / Silvio Berlusconi	
2007	To Each His Own Cinema	No	Yes	Yes	No	None	Segment: "Diario di uno spettatore"
2007	L'ultimo campionato	Yes	Yes	Yes	Yes	Himself	Short film
2008	Quiet Chaos	Yes	No	Yes	No	Pietro Paladini	
2011	We Have a Pope	Yes	Yes	Yes	Yes	Psychoanalyst	
2012	Girlfriend in a Coma	Yes	No	No	No	Himself	Documentary film
2015	Mia Madre	Yes	Yes	Yes	Yes	Giovanni	
2015	Filmstudio Mon Amour	Yes	No	No	No	Himself	Documentary film
2017	Evviva Giuseppe	Yes	No	No	No	Himself	Documentary film
2018	Santiago, Italia	Yes	Yes	Yes	Yes	Himself	Documentary film
2021	Three Floors	Yes	Yes	Yes	Yes	Vittorio Bardi	
2022	Las leonas	No	No	No	Yes	None	
2022	The Hummingbird	Yes	No	No	No	Daniele Carradoni	
2023	A Brighter Tomorrow	Yes	Yes	Yes	Yes	Gianni	
2024	Quasi a casa	No	No	No	Yes	None	
2024	Vittoria	No	No	No	Yes	None	
2026	It Will Happen Tonight	Yes	Yes	Yes	Yes	TBA	
TBA	Primo viaggio †	TBA	No	No	Yes	TBA	In production

== Accolades ==
- Cannes Film Festival
  - Prix de la mise en scène 1994: Caro diario
  - Palme d'Or 2001: The Son's Room
  - Prix de la FIPRESCI 2001: The Son's Room
  - Carrosse d'Or 2004
  - Rome's Award 2006: Il caimano
  - Ecumenical Prize 2015: Mia madre
- Venice Film Festival
  - Silver Lion – Special Jury Prize 1981: Sweet Dreams
  - "Bastone Bianco" Filmcritic Award 1989: Red Wood Pigeon
- Berlin International Film Festival
  - Silver Bear – Jury Grand Prix 1986: The Mass Is Ended
  - Jury C.I.C.A.E Award 1986: The Mass Is Ended
- Chicago International Film Festival
  - Golden Plaque for Best Documentary Short Film 2003: The Last Customer
  - Silver Plaque for Best Screenplay 2008: Quiet Chaos
- European Film Awards
  - FIPRESCI Prize 1994: Caro diario
- São Paulo International Film Festival
  - Critics Award 1990: Red Wood Pigeon
- Sudbury Cinéfest
  - Best International Film 1994: Caro diario
- Sant Jordi Awards
  - Best Foreign Film 1995: Caro diario
- Guild of German Art House Cinemas
  - Guild Film Award – Silver 2002: The Son's Room
- David di Donatello
  - Alitalia Award 1986
  - Golden Medal of the City of Rome 1986
  - Best Actor 1991: The Yes Man
  - Best Film 1994: Caro diario
  - Best Film 2001: The Son's Room
  - Best Film 2006: Il caimano
  - Best Director 2006: Il caimano
  - Best Producer 2006: Il caimano
  - Best Documentary 2019: Santiago
- Silver Ribbon
  - Best Story 1978: Ecce Bombo
  - Best Producer 1988: It's Happening Tomorrow
  - Best Story 1990: Red Wood Pigeon
  - Best Producer 1992: The Yes Man
  - Best Director 1994: Caro diario
  - Best Producer 1996: The Second Time
  - Best Director 2001: The Son's Room
  - Best Producer 2007: Il caimano
  - Best Director 2011: We Have a Pope
  - Best Story 2011: We Have a Pope
  - Best Producer 2011: We Have a Pope
  - Ribbon of the Year 2019: Santiago
- Ciak d'oro Awards
  - Best Director 1986: The Mass Is Ended
  - Best Screenplay 1986: The Mass Is Ended
  - Best Director 1990: Red Wood Pigeon
  - Best Film 1994: Caro diario
  - Best Director 1994: Caro diario
  - Best Screenplay 1994: Caro diario
  - Best Film 2001: The Son's Room
  - Best Director 2001: The Son's Room
  - Best Film 2006: Il caimano
  - Best Director 2006: Il caimano
  - Best Screenplay 2006: Il caimano
  - Best Film 2011: We Have a Pope
  - Best Screenplay 2011: We Have a Pope
  - Best Director 2015: Mia madre
  - Honorary Ciak d'oro 2019
- UBU Awards
  - Best Italian Movie 1977/78: Ecce Bombo
  - Best Actor 1984/85: Sweet Body of Bianca
- Globi d'oro Awards
  - Best Debut 1977: I Am Self Sufficient
  - Best Film 1994: Caro diario
  - Best Film 2011: We Have a Pope
- Cahiers du cinéma
  - Best Film 1989: Red Wood Pigeon (ex equo with Do the Right Thing)
  - Best Film 1994: Caro diario
  - Best Film 2011: We Have a Pope
  - Best Film 2015: Mia madre
