= David di Donatello for Best Screenplay =

Italian film award

David di Donatello Award for Best Screenplay
- Country: Italy
- Presented by: Accademia del Cinema Italiano
- First award: 1975 (for writing in films released during the 1974/1975 film season)
- Final award: 2016 (for writing in films released during the 2015/2016 film season)
- Website: daviddidonatello.it

The David di Donatello Award for Best Screenplay (Italian: David di Donatello per la migliore sceneggiatura) was a film award presented by the Accademia del Cinema Italiano (ACI, Academy of Italian Cinema) to recognize outstanding screenwriting in a film released in Italy during the year preceding the ceremony. The award was presented annually from 1975 to 2016, when it was split between the Original and Adapted Screenplay categories.

Nominees and winners were selected via runoff voting by all the members of the Accademia.

== Winners and nominees ==
Below, winners are listed first in the colored row, followed by other nominees.

=== 1970s ===
Year	Film	Nominees	Ref.
1974/75 (20th)
1974/75 (20th)	Come Home and Meet My Wife	Age & Scarpelli	
1975/76 (21st)
1975/76 (21st)	Eye of the Cat	Alberto Bevilacqua and Nino Manfredi	
1976/77 (22nd)
1976/77 (22nd)	The Bishop's Bedroom	Leo Benvenuti and Piero De Bernardi	
1977/78 (23rd)
1977/78 (23rd)	Not awarded		
1978/79 (24th)
1978/79 (24th)	Not awarded		

=== 1980s ===
Year	Film	Nominees	Ref.
1979/80 (25th)
1979/80 (25th)	Not awarded		
1980/81 (26th)
1980/81 (26th)	Three Brothers	Tonino Guerra and Francesco Rosi	
1980/81 (26th)	Passion of Love	Ruggero Maccari and Ettore Scola	
1980/81 (26th)	I'm Starting from Three	Massimo Troisi and Anna Pavignano	
1981/82 (27th)
1981/82 (27th)	Tales of Ordinary Madness	Sergio Amidei and Marco Ferreri	
1981/82 (27th)	Sweet Pea	Bernardino Zapponi	
1981/82 (27th)	Talcum Powder	Carlo Verdone and Enrico Oldoini	
1982/83 (28th)
1982/83 (28th)	That Night in Varennes	Sergio Amidei and Ettore Scola	
1982/83 (28th)	Blow to the Heart	Gianni Amelio and Vincenzo Cerami	
1982/83 (28th)	The Night of the Shooting Stars	Paolo and Vittorio Taviani	
1983/84 (29th)
1983/84 (29th)	And the Ship Sails On	Federico Fellini and Tonino Guerra	
1983/84 (29th)	Le Bal	Ruggero Maccari, Jean-Claude Penchenat, Furio Scarpelli, and Ettore Scola	
1983/84 (29th)	Sweet Body of Bianca	Nanni Moretti and Sandro Petraglia	
1983/84 (29th)	Where's Picone?	Nanni Loy and Elvio Porta	
1984/85 (30th)
1984/85 (30th)	Kaos	Paolo Taviani, Vittorio Taviani, and Tonino Guerra	
1984/85 (30th)	A Proper Scandal	Suso Cecchi D'Amico	
1984/85 (30th)	The Three of Us	Pupi Avati and Antonio Avati	
1985/86 (31st)
1985/86 (31st)	Let's Hope It's a Girl	Leo Benvenuti, Suso Cecchi D'Amico, Piero De Bernardi, Mario Monicelli, and Tullio Pinelli	
1985/86 (31st)	Ginger and Fred	Tonino Guerra and Tullio Pinelli	
1985/86 (31st)	The Mass Is Ended	Nanni Moretti and Sandro Petraglia	
1986/87 (32nd)
1986/87 (32nd)	The Family	Ruggero Maccari, Furio Scarpelli, and Ettore Scola	
1986/87 (32nd)	Christmas Present	Pupi Avati and Giovanni Bruzzi	
1986/87 (32nd)	A Tale of Love	Francesco Maselli	
1987/88 (33rd)
1987/88 (33rd)	Io e mia sorella	Leo Benvenuti, Piero De Bernardi, and Carlo Verdone	
1987/88 (33rd)	The Last Emperor	Bernardo Bertolucci and Mark Peploe	
1987/88 (33rd)	Dark Eyes	Aleksandr Adabashyan, Nikita Mikhalkov, and Suso Cecchi D'Amico	
1988/89 (34th)
1988/89 (34th)	Mignon Has Come to Stay	Francesca Archibugi, Gloria Malatesta, and Claudia Sbarigia	
1988/89 (34th)	Compagni di scuola	Leo Benvenuti, Piero De Bernardi, and Carlo Verdone	
1988/89 (34th)	The Legend of the Holy Drinker	Ermanno Olmi and Tullio Kezich	

=== 1990s ===
Year	Film	Nominees	Ref.
1989/90 (35th)
1989/90 (35th)	The Story of Boys & Girls	Pupi Avati	
1989/90 (35th)	Dark Illness	Suso Cecchi D'Amico and Tonino Guerra	
1989/90 (35th)	Open Doors	Gianni Amelio, Vincenzo Cerami, and Alessandro Sermoneta	
1989/90 (35th)	Red Wood Pigeon	Nanni Moretti	
1989/90 (35th)	Street Kids	Nanni Loy and Elvio Porta	
1990/91 (36th)
1990/91 (36th)	To Want to Fly	Maurizio Nichetti and Guido Manuli	
1990/91 (36th)	The Yes Man	Sandro Petraglia, Stefano Rulli and Daniele Luchetti	
1990/91 (36th)	The House of Smiles	Liliane Betti, Marco Ferreri, and Antonino Marino	
1990/91 (36th)	Mediterraneo	Enzo Monteleone	
1990/91 (36th)	The Station	Filippo Ascione, Umberto Marino, and Sergio Rubini	
1991/92 (37th)
1991/92 (37th)	Damned the Day I Met You	Carlo Verdone and Francesca Marciano	
1991/92 (37th)	Parenti serpenti	Carmine Amoroso, Suso Cecchi D'Amico, Piero De Bernardi, and Mario Monicelli	
1991/92 (37th)	The Invisible Wall	Sandro Petraglia, Andrea Purgatori, and Stefano Rulli	
1991/92 (37th)	The Stolen Children	Gianni Amelio, Sandro Petraglia, and Stefano Rulli	
1992/93 (38th)
1992/93 (38th)	The Great Pumpkin	Francesca Archibugi	
1992/93 (38th)	The Escort	Graziano Diana and Simona Izzo	
1992/93 (38th)	Jonah Who Lived in the Whale	Roberto Faenza and Filippo Ottoni	
1993/94 (39th)
1993/94 (39th)	For Love, Only for Love	Ugo Chiti and Giovanni Veronesi	
1993/94 (39th)	Caro diario	Nanni Moretti	
1993/94 (39th)	Let's Not Keep in Touch	Francesca Marciano and Carlo Verdone	
1994/95 (40th)
1994/95 (40th)	Nemici d'infanzia	Luigi Magni and Carla Vistarini	
1994/95 (40th)	No Skin	Alessandro D'Alatri	
1994/95 (40th)	Belle al Bar	Alessandro Benvenuti, Ugo Chiti, and Nicola Zavagli	
1995/96 (41st)
1995/96 (41st)	Celluloide	Furio Scarpelli, Ugo Pirro, and Carlo Lizzani	
1995/96 (41st)	August Vacation	Francesco Bruni and Paolo Virzì	
1995/96 (41st)	The Star Maker	Fabio Rinaudo and Giuseppe Tornatore	
1996/97 (42nd)
1996/97 (42nd)	Nel profondo paese straniero	Fabio Carpi	
1996/97 (42nd)	The Cyclone	Leonardo Pieraccioni and Giovanni Veronesi	
1996/97 (42nd)	The Game Bag	Marco Bechis, Umberto Contarello, Lara Fremder, Gigi Riva, and Maurizio Zaccaro	
1996/97 (42nd)	Nirvana	Pino Cacucci, Gloria Corica, and Gabriele Salvatores	
1996/97 (42nd)	The Truce	Sandro Petraglia, Francesco Rosi, and Stefano Rulli	
1997/98 (43rd)
1997/98 (43rd)	Life Is Beautiful	Vincenzo Cerami and Roberto Benigni	
1997/98 (43rd)	Notes of Love	Mimmo Calopresti	
1997/98 (43rd)	Ovosodo	Paolo Virzì	
1998/99 (44th)
1998/99 (44th)	Not of this World	Giuseppe Piccioni, Gualtiero Rosella, and Lucia Zei	
1998/99 (44th)	The Legend of 1900	Giuseppe Tornatore	
1998/99 (44th)	Marriages	Cristina Comencini	

=== 2000s ===
Year	Film	Nominees	Ref.
1999/00 (45th)
1999/00 (45th)	Bread and Tulips	Doriana Leondeff and Silvio Soldini	
1999/00 (45th)	Canone inverso	Simona Izzo and Ricky Tognazzi	
1999/00 (45th)	Olympic Garage	Marco Bechis and Lara Fremder	
2000/01 (46th)
2000/01 (46th)	One Hundred Steps	Claudio Fava, Monica Capelli, and Marco Tullio Giordana	
2000/01 (46th)	The Last Kiss	Gabriele Muccino	
2000/01 (46th)	The Son's Room	Linda Ferri, Nanni Moretti, and Heidrun Schleef	
2001/02 (47th)
2001/02 (47th)	The Profession of Arms	Ermanno Olmi	
2001/02 (47th)	Burning in the Wind	Doriana Leondeff and Silvio Soldini	
2001/02 (47th)	One Man Up	Paolo Sorrentino	
2002/03 (48th)
2002/03 (48th)	The Embalmer	Matteo Garrone, Massimo Gaudioso, and Ugo Chiti	
2002/03 (48th)	Casomai	Alessandro D'Alatri and Anna Pavignano	
2002/03 (48th)	Facing Windows	Gianni Romoli and Ferzan Özpetek	
2002/03 (48th)	It Can't Be All Our Fault	Piero De Bernardi, Pasquale Plastino, Fiamma Satta, and Carlo Verdone	
2002/03 (48th)	My Mother's Smile	Marco Bellocchio	
2002/03 (48th)	Remember Me, My Love	Gabriele Muccino and Heidrun Schleef	
2003/04 (49th)
2003/04 (49th)	The Best of Youth	Sandro Petraglia and Stefano Rulli	
2003/04 (49th)	Caterina in the Big City	Francesco Bruni and Paolo Virzì	
2003/04 (49th)	Don't Move	Margaret Mazzantini and Sergio Castellitto	
2003/04 (49th)	Good Morning, Night	Marco Bellocchio	
2003/04 (49th)	What Will Happen to Us	Giovanni Veronesi and Silvio Muccino	
2004/05 (50th)
2004/05 (50th)	The Consequences of Love	Paolo Sorrentino	
2004/05 (50th)	After Midnight	Davide Ferrario	
2004/05 (50th)	Sacred Heart	Gianni Romoli and Ferzan Özpetek	
2004/05 (50th)	The Keys to the House	Gianni Amelio, Sandro Petraglia, and Stefano Rulli	
2004/05 (50th)	Manual of Love	Ugo Chiti and Giovanni Veronesi	
2005/06 (51st)
2005/06 (51st)	Romanzo criminale	Sandro Petraglia, Stefano Rulli, Giancarlo De Cataldo, and Michele Placido	
2005/06 (51st)	The Caiman	Nanni Moretti, Francesco Piccolo, and Federica Pontremoli	
2005/06 (51st)	My Best Enemy	Silvio Muccino, Pasquale Plastino, Silvia Ranfagni, and Carlo Verdone	
2005/06 (51st)	Notte prima degli esami	Fausto Brizzi, Massimiliano Bruno, and Marco Martani	
2005/06 (51st)	Our Land	Angelo Pasquini, Carla Cavallucci, and Sergio Rubini	
2006/07 (52nd)
2006/07 (52nd)	My Brother is an Only Child	Daniele Luchetti, Sandro Petraglia, and Stefano Rulli	
2006/07 (52nd)	Along the Ridge	Linda Ferri, Francesco Giammusso, Kim Rossi Stuart, and Federico Starnone	
2006/07 (52nd)	Nuovomondo	Emanuele Crialese	
2006/07 (52nd)	One Hundred Nails	Ermanno Olmi	
2006/07 (52nd)	The Unknown Woman	Giuseppe Tornatore	
2007/08 (53rd)
2007/08 (53rd)	The Girl by the Lake	Sandro Petraglia	
2007/08 (53rd)	Days and Clouds	Doriana Leondeff, Francesco Piccolo, Federica Pontremoli, and Silvio Soldini	
2007/08 (53rd)	Quiet Chaos	Nanni Moretti, Laura Paolucci, and Francesco Piccolo	
2007/08 (53rd)	The Right Distance	Doriana Leondeff, Carlo Mazzacurati, Marco Pettenello, and Claudio Piersanti	
2007/08 (53rd)	The Wind Blows Round	Giorgio Diritti and Fredo Valla	
2008/09 (54th)
2008/09 (54th)	Gomorrah	Maurizio Braucci, Ugo Chiti, Gianni Di Gregorio, Matteo Garrone, Massimo Gaudioso, and Roberto Saviano	
2008/09 (54th)	Il Divo	Paolo Sorrentino	
2008/09 (54th)	Many Kisses Later	Fausto Brizzi, Marco Martani, and Massimiliano Bruno	
2008/09 (54th)	We Can Do That	Fabio Bonifacci and Giulio Manfredonia	
2008/09 (54th)	Your Whole Life Ahead of You	Francesco Bruni and Paolo Virzì	

=== 2010s ===
Year	Film	Nominees	Ref.
2009/10 (55th)
2009/10 (55th)	The First Beautiful Thing	Francesco Bruni, Francesco Piccolo, and Paolo Virzì	
2009/10 (55th)	Fort Apache Napoli	James Carrington, Andrea Purgatori, Marco Risi, and Maurizio Cerino	
2009/10 (55th)	Loose Cannons	Ivan Cotroneo and Ferzan Özpetek	
2009/10 (55th)	The Man Who Will Come	Giorgio Diritti, Giovanni Galavotti, and Tania Pedroni	
2009/10 (55th)	Vincere	Marco Bellocchio and Daniela Ceselli	
2010/11 (56th)
2010/11 (56th)	Noi credevamo	Mario Martone and Giancarlo De Cataldo	
2010/11 (56th)	Basilicata Coast to Coast	Rocco Papaleo and Valter Lupo	
2010/11 (56th)	The Immature	Paolo Genovese	
2010/11 (56th)	La nostra vita	Sandro Petraglia, Stefano Rulli, and Daniele Luchetti	
2010/11 (56th)	A Quiet Life	Filippo Gravino, Guido Iuculano, and Claudio Cupellini	
2011/12 (57th)
2011/12 (57th)	This Must Be the Place	Paolo Sorrentino and Umberto Contarello	
2011/12 (57th)	Caesar Must Die	Paolo Taviani, Vittorio Taviani, and Fabio Cavalli	
2011/12 (57th)	Easy!	Francesco Bruni	
2011/12 (57th)	Piazza Fontana: The Italian Conspiracy	Marco Tullio Giordana, Sandro Petraglia, and Stefano Rulli	
2011/12 (57th)	We Have a Pope	Nanni Moretti, Francesco Piccolo and Federica Ponteremoli	
2012/13 (58th)
2012/13 (58th)	Long Live Freedom	Roberto Andò and Angelo Pasquini	
2012/13 (58th)	The Best Offer	Giuseppe Tornatore	
2012/13 (58th)	A Five Star Life	Ivan Cotroneo, Francesca Marciano, and Maria Sole Tognazzi	
2012/13 (58th)	Me and You	Niccolò Ammaniti, Umberto Contarello, Francesca Marciano, and Bernardo Bertolucci	
2012/13 (58th)	Reality	Maurizio Braucci, Ugo Chiti, Matteo Garrone, and Massimo Gaudioso	
2013/14 (59th)
2013/14 (59th)	Human Capital	Francesco Piccolo, Francesco Bruni, and Paolo Virzì	
2013/14 (59th)	The Great Beauty	Paolo Sorrentino and Umberto Contarello	
2013/14 (59th)	I Can Quit Whenever I Want	Valerio Attanasio, Andrea Garello, and Sydney Sibilia	
2013/14 (59th)	The Mafia Kills Only in Summer	Michele Astori, Pif, and Marco Martani	
2013/14 (59th)	Miele	Francesca Marciano, Valia Santola, and Valeria Golino	
2014/15 (60th)
2014/15 (60th)	Black Souls	Francesco Munzi, Fabrizio Ruggirello, and Maurizio Braucci	
2014/15 (60th)	Hungry Hearts	Saverio Costanzo	
2014/15 (60th)	The Legendary Giulia and Other Miracles	Edoardo Leo and Marco Bonini	
2014/15 (60th)	Leopardi	Mario Martone and Ippolita Di Majo	
2014/15 (60th)	Mia Madre	Nanni Moretti, Francesco Piccolo, and Valia Santella	
2015/16 (61st)
2015/16 (61st)	Perfect Strangers	Paolo Genovese, Filippo Bologna, Paolo Costella, Paola Mammini, and Rolando Ravello	
2015/16 (61st)	Don't Be Bad	Claudio Caligari, Francesca Serafini, and Giordano Meacci	
2015/16 (61st)	Tale of Tales	Matteo Garrone, Edoardo Albinati, Ugo Chiti, and Massimo Gaudioso	
2015/16 (61st)	They Call Me Jeeg	Nicola Guaglianone and Menotti	
2015/16 (61st)	Youth	Paolo Sorrentino	

== See also ==
- Nastro d'Argento for Best Screenplay
- Cinema of Italy
