= Stefano Rulli =

Italian screenwriter

- Born: 3 October 1950 (age 75); Rome, Italy
- Occupation: Screenwriter
- Years active: 1975–present
- Spouse: Clara Sereni (died 2018)
- Children: 1

Stefano Rulli (Italian pronunciation: [ˈsteːfano ˈrulli]; born 3 October 1949) is an Italian screenwriter. He is best known for his collaborations with fellow screenwriter Sandro Petraglia, including La piovra (1987–1995) and The Best of Youth (2003). Rulli also directed the documentary film Un silenzio particolare (2004), about his son Matteo, who has schizophrenia.

== Filmography ==
=== Film ===
Year	Title	Notes
1975	Matti da slegare	Documentary; Director only
1977	In the Highest of Skies	
1986	La donna del traghetto	
1989	Forever Mery	
1990	Pummarò	
1991	The Yes Man	
1991	The Invisible Wall	
1992	The Stolen Children	
1993	The Storm Is Coming	
1994	L'unico paese al mondo	Unknown segment Also director
1994	The Bull	
1995	School	
1995	Who Killed Pasolini?	
1996	Vesna Goes Fast	
1997	The Truce	
1997	Auguri professore	Story only
1998	Little Teachers	
2003	The Best of Youth	
2004	Un silenzio particolare	Documentary; Also director
2004	The Keys to the House	
2005	Once You're Born You Can No Longer Hide	
2005	Romanzo Criminale	
2006	The Caiman	Cameo only
2007	My Brother Is an Only Child	
2010	La nostra vita	
2012	Piazza Fontana: The Italian Conspiracy	
2012	Dormant Beauty	
2013	Siberian Education	
2013	Those Happy Years	
2015	Suburra	
2024	La casa degli sguardi	

=== Television ===
Year	Title	Notes
1977	Il gabbiano	Television film
1979	The Cinema Machine	Documentary; 5 episodes; also director
1986	Mino	4 episodes
1986	Attentato al Papa	2 episodes
1987—1995	La piovra	30 episodes
1988	Una vittoria	Television film
1991	The Mysteries of the Dark Jungle	3 episodes
1997	Don Milani - Il priore di Barbiana	Television film
1999	La vita che verrà	4 episodes
2001	Uno bianca	Television film
2001	Almost America	Television film
2002	Perlasca – Un eroe Italiano	Television film
2005	Cefalonia	Television film
2008	O' professore	Television film
2010	Le cose che restano	4 episodes
2013	Volare - La grande storia di Domenico Modugno	Television film
2015	L'Oriana	Television film
2016	The Young Pope	2 episodes

== Awards and nominations ==
Year	Award	Category	Work	Result
1975	Berlin International Film Festival	FIPRESCI Prize	Matti da slegare	Won
1975	Berlin International Film Festival	OCIC Award	Matti da slegare	Won
1979	Berlin International Film Festival	FIPRESCI Prize	The Cinema Machine	Won
1990	Golden Ciak	Best Screenplay	Forever Mery	Nominated
1991	David di Donatello	Best Screenplay	The Yes Man	Won
1992	Golden Ciak	Best Screenplay	The Yes Man	Won
1992	Nastro d'argento	Best Screenplay	The Yes Man	Nominated
1992	Nastro d'argento	Best Original Story	The Invisible Wall	Won
1992	Golden Ciak	Best Screenplay	The Invisible Wall	Nominated
1992	David di Donatello	Best Screenplay	The Invisible Wall	Nominated
1992	David di Donatello	Best Screenplay	The Stolen Children	Nominated
1993	Nastro d'argento	Best Screenplay	The Stolen Children	Won
1993	Golden Ciak	Best Screenplay	The Stolen Children	Won
1995	Nastro d'argento	Best Original Story	The Bull	Nominated
1996	Golden Ciak	Best Screenplay	School	Nominated
1996	Nastro d'argento	Best Screenplay	School	Nominated
1997	David di Donatello	Best Screenplay	The Truce	Nominated
2003	European Film Awards	Best Screenwriter	The Best of Youth	Nominated
2004	David di Donatello	Best Screenplay	The Best of Youth	Won
2004	Golden Ciak	Best Screenplay	The Best of Youth	Nominated
2004	Italian Golden Globe	Best Screenplay	The Best of Youth	Won
2004	Nastro d'argento	Best Screenplay	The Best of Youth	Won
2004	Venice International Film Festival	Young Cinema Award	Un silenzio particolare	Won
2005	David di Donatello	Best Documentary	Un silenzio particolare	Won
2005	David di Donatello	Best Screenplay	The Keys to the House	Nominated
2005	Golden Ciak	Best Screenplay	The Keys to the House	Won
2005	Nastro d'argento	Best Screenplay	The Keys to the House	Nominated
2005	Vancouver International Film Festival	Best Documentary Feature	Un silenzio particolare	Won
2006	David di Donatello	Best Screenplay	Romanzo Criminale	Won
2006	Golden Ciak	Best Screenplay	Romanzo Criminale	Nominated
2006	Nastro d'argento	Best Screenplay	Romanzo Criminale	Nominated
2007	David di Donatello	Best Screenplay	My Brother is an Only Child	Won
2007	Golden Ciak	Best Screenplay	My Brother is an Only Child	Nominated
2008	Nastro d'argento	Best Screenplay	My Brother is an Only Child	Won
2010	Nastro d'argento	Best Screenplay	La nostra vita	Nominated
2011	David di Donatello	Best Screenplay	La nostra vita	Nominated
2012	Nastro d'argento	Best Screenplay	Piazza Fontana: The Italian Conspiracy	Won
2012	David di Donatello	Best Screenplay	Piazza Fontana: The Italian Conspiracy	Nominated
2012	Golden Ciak	Best Screenplay	Piazza Fontana: The Italian Conspiracy	Nominated
2012	Italian Golden Globe	Best Screenplay	Piazza Fontana: The Italian Conspiracy	Nominated
2014	Nastro d'Argento	Best Screenplay	Those Happy Years	Nominated
