= Nastro d'Argento for Best Screenplay =

The Nastro d'Argento (Silver Ribbon) is a film award assigned each year, since 1948, by Sindacato Nazionale dei Giornalisti Cinematografici Italiani, the association of Italian film critics.

== History ==
The union of film journalists was founded in the same year in which the Nastri were born, 1946, by a group of film journalists and essayists, some of whom later became directors (Steno and Mario Soldati, who was its first president) and authors (Michelangelo Antonioni, Antonio Pietrangeli). The first regulation motivated the establishment of the Silver Ribbon to "promote the continuous artistic, technical and industrial improvement of Italian cinema and pay homage to its relevant acquisitions".

It was delivered for the first time in 1946 in Rome, at the Hotel de Russie. The editions were held mainly between Rome and Taormina, with the exception of some particular editions (in Florence, after the 1966 flood, as a sign of solidarity) and, always in its first years of life, also in Sorrento.

In the first editions, the prizes were awarded to the films presented during the year considered by the industry, the one that ends with the end of the season; they were then attributed to the films released in the calendar year, while subsequently they were again assigned to the films released in theaters within the days immediately following the Cannes Film Festival, therefore within the last days of May, when the 'five' finalists are announced to which an event with all the candidates for the awards is dedicated.

After a few editions in the headquarters of the French Academy in Villa Medici, it is held, also in Rome, in the space of the MAXXI Museum. The prizes are awarded on the basis of 'five' proposed by the national board of the Union to the vote (notarial) of the members of the union, film journalists of the press, television, radio and Internet.

The delivery of the Silver Ribbons is combined with the Guglielmo Biraghi prizes awarded since 2001, destined for the best of the young new actors in the cinema of the year.

== 1940s and 1950s ==
- 1948: Gaspare Cataldo, Pala & Alberto Vecchietti - The Brothers Karamazov
- 1949: Vittorio De Sica, Cesare Zavattini, Suso Cecchi D'Amico, Oreste Biancoli, Adolfo Franci & Gerardo Guerrieri – Bicycle Thieves
- 1950: Suso Cecchi D'Amico, Cesare Zavattini & Renato Castellani – It's Forever Springtime
- 1951: Cesare Zavattini & Alessandro Blasetti – Father's Dilemma
- 1952: Ettore Maria Margadonna, Titina De Filippo & Renato Castellani – Two Cents Worth of Hope
- 1953: not assigned
- 1954: Vitaliano Brancati, Sergio Amidei, Vincenzo Talarico & Luigi Zampa – Easy Years
- 1955: not assigned
- 1956: Pasquale Festa Campanile, Massimo Franciosa & Giuseppe Mancione – Wild Love
- 1957: Cesare Zavattini – The Roof
- 1958: Valerio Zurlini, Leo Benvenuti, Piero De Bernardi & Alberto Lattuada – Guendalina
- 1959: Age & Scarpelli, Suso Cecchi D'Amico & Mario Monicelli – Big Deal on Madonna Street

== 1960s ==
- 1960: Ennio De Concini, Alfredo Giannetti & Pietro Germi – The Facts of Murder
- 1961: Pasquale Festa Campanile, Suso Cecchi D'Amico, Massimo Franciosa, Enrico Medioli & Luchino Visconti- Rocco and His Brothers
- 1962: Ennio De Concini, Alfredo Giannetti & Pietro Germi – Divorce Italian Style
- 1963: Pasquale Festa Campanile, Massimo Franciosa, Carlo Bernari & Nanni Loy- The Four Days of Naples
- 1964: Ennio Flaiano, Tullio Pinelli, Brunello Rondi & Federico Fellini – 8½
- 1965: Age & Scarpelli, Luciano Vincenzoni & Pietro Germi – Seduced and Abandoned
- 1966: Ruggero Maccari, Ettore Scola & Antonio Pietrangeli – I Knew Her Well
- 1967: Age & Scarpelli, Luciano Vincenzoni & Pietro Germi – The Birds, the Bees and the Italians
- 1968: Ugo Pirro & Elio Petri – We Still Kill the Old Way
- 1969: Dino Maiuri, Massimo De Rita & Carlo Lizzani – Bandits in Milan

== 1970s ==
- 1970: Fabio Carpi & Nelo Risi – Diary of a Schizophrenic Girl
- 1971: Adriano Baracco, Tullio Kezich, Alberto Lattuada & Piero Chiara – Come Have Coffee with Us
- 1972: Leo Benvenuti, Piero De Bernardi & Nino Manfredi – Between Miracles
- 1973: Alberto Bevilacqua – Questa specie d'amore
- 1974: Tonino Guerra & Federico Fellini – Amarcord
- 1975: Age & Scarpelli & Ettore Scola – We All Loved Each Other So Much
- 1976: Tullio Pinelli, Leo Benvenuti, Piero De Bernardi & Pietro Germi – Amici miei
- 1977: Sergio Amidei & Mario Monicelli – An Average Little Man
- 1978: Ruggero Maccari, Ettore Scola & Maurizio Costanzo – A Special Day
- 1979: Ermanno Olmi – The Tree of Wooden Clogs

== 1980s ==
- 1980: Age & Scarpelli & Ettore Scola – La terrazza
- 1981: Ruggero Maccari & Ettore Scola – Passion of Love
- 1982: Tullio Pinelli, Leo Benvenuti, Piero De Bernardi, Bernardino Zapponi & Mario Monicelli- Il Marchese del Grillo
- 1983: Paolo & Vittorio Taviani, Tonino Guerra & Giuliani G. De Negri – The Night of the Shooting Stars
- 1984: Elvio Porta & Nanni Loy – Where's Picone?
- 1985: Paolo & Vittorio Taviani & Tonino Guerra – Kaos
- 1986: Tullio Pinelli, Leo Benvenuti, Piero De Bernardi, Suso Cecchi D'Amico & Mario Monicelli- Let's Hope It's a Girl
- 1987: Ruggero Maccari, Ettore Scola & Furio Scarpelli – The Family
- 1988: Massimo Troisi & Anna Pavignano – Le vie del Signore sono finite
- 1989: Tullio Kezich & Ermanno Olmi – The Legend of the Holy Drinker

== 1990s ==
- 1990: Pupi Avati – The Story of Boys & Girls
- 1991: Suso Cecchi D'Amico & Tonino Guerra – Dark Illness
- 1992: Andrea Barbato & Emidio Greco – A Simple Story
- 1993: Stefano Rulli, Sandro Petraglia & Gianni Amelio – The Stolen Children
- 1994: Francesca Archibugi – The Great Pumpkin
- 1995: Alessandro D'Alatri – No Skin
- 1996: Leone Pompucci, Filippo Pichi & Paolo Rossi – Camerieri
- 1997: Giovanni Veronesi & Leonardo Pieraccioni – The Cyclone
- 1998: Vincenzo Cerami & Roberto Benigni – Life Is Beautiful
- 1999: Giuseppe Tornatore – The Legend of 1900

== 2000s ==
- 2000: Doriana Leondeff & Silvio Soldini – Bread and Tulips
  - Antonio & Pupi Avati – Midsummer Night's Dance
  - Bernardo Bertolucci & Clare Peploe – Besieged
  - Enzo Monteleone & Angelo Orlando – Outlaw
  - Gabriele Muccino & Adele Tulli – But Forever in My Mind
- 2001: Claudio Fava, Marco Tullio Giordana & Monica Zapelli – One Hundred Steps
  - Francesca Archibugi – Domani
  - Leonardo Fasoli & Gianluca Maria Tavarelli – This Is Not Paradise
  - Linda Ferri, Nanni Moretti & Heidrun Schleef – The Son's Room
  - Ferzan Ozpetek & Gianni Romoli – The Ignorant Fairies
- 2002: Giulia Calenda, Cristina Comencini & Lucilla Schiaffino – The Best Day of My Life
  - Marco Bellocchio – My Mother's Smile
  - Emanuele Crialese – Respiro
  - Enzo D'Alò & Umberto Marino – Momo
  - Paolo Sorrentino – One Man Up
- 2003: Gabriele Muccino & Heidrun Schleef – Remember Me, My Love
  - Niccolò Ammaniti & Francesca Marciano – I'm Not Scared
  - Massimo D'Anolfi & Roberta Torre – Angela
  - Roberto Faenza – The Soul Keeper
  - Enzo Monteleone – El Alamein - The Line of Fire
  - Ferzan Ozpetek & Gianni Romoli – Facing Windows
- 2004: Sandro Petraglia & Stefano Rulli – The Best of Youth
  - Franco Battiato & Manlio Sgalambro Lost Love
  - Marco Bellocchio – Good Morning, Night
  - Salvatore Mereu – Three-Step Dance
  - Francesco Bruni & Paolo Virzì – Caterina in the Big City
- 2005: Sergio Castellitto & Margaret Mazzantini – Don't Move
  - Gianni Amelio, Sandro Petraglia & Stefano Rulli – The Keys to the House
  - Pupi Avati – Christmas Rematch
  - Davide Ferrario – After Midnight
  - Andrea Frazzi, Antonio Frazzi, Marcello Fois, Diego De Silva & Ferdinando Vicentini Orgnani – Certi bambini
- 2006: Ugo Chiti & Giovanni Veronesi – Manual of Love
  - Alessandro D'Alatri, Gennaro Nunziante & Domenico Starnone – The Fever
  - Sandro Petraglia, Stefano Rulli, Giancarlo De Cataldo & Michele Placido – Romanzo criminale
  - Giuseppe Rocca, Laura Sabatino & Antonietta De Lillo – The Remains of Nothing
  - Gabriele Salvatores & Fabio Scamoni – Quo Vadis, Baby?
- 2007: Ferzan Ozpetek & Gianni Romoli – Saturn in Opposition
  - Antonio Capuano – Mario's War
  - Emanuele Crialese – Golden Door
  - Linda Ferri, Federico Starnone, Francesco Giammusso & Kim Rossi Stuart – Along the Ridge
  - Mario Monicelli, Alessandro Bencivenni & Domenico Saverni – The Roses of the Desert
  - Giuseppe Tornatore – The Unknown Woman
- 2008: Sandro Petraglia – The Girl by the Lake with Daniele Luchetti & Stefano Rulli – My Brother Is an Only Child
  - Francesco Bruni & Paolo Virzì – Your Whole Life Ahead of You
  - Peter Del Monte & Michele Pellegrini – In Your Hands
  - Doriana Leondeff, Francesco Piccolo, Federica Pontremoli & Silvio Soldini – Days and Clouds
  - Michele Pellegrini & Gianni Zanasi – Don't Think About It
- 2009: Paolo Sorrentino – Il Divo
  - Francesca Archibugi – A Question of the Heart
  - Maurizio Braucci, Ugo Chiti, Gianni Di Gregorio & Matteo Garrone – Gomorrah
  - Fausto Brizzi, Massimiliano Bruno & Marco Martani – Ex
  - Jim Carrington, Andrea Purgatori & Marco Risi – Fort Apache Napoli

== 2010s ==
- 2010: Francesco Bruni, Francesco Piccolo & Paolo Virzì – The First Beautiful Thing
  - Ivan Cotroneo, Ferzan Ozpetek – Loose Cannons
  - Alessandro Genovesi & Gabriele Salvatores – Happy Family
  - Gabriele Muccino – Baciami ancora
  - Sandro Petraglia, Stefano Rulli & Daniele Luchetti – La nostra vita
- 2011: Massimo Gaudioso – Benvenuti al Sud
  - Massimiliano Bruno & Edoardo Falcone with the collaboration of Fausto Brizzi – Escort in Love
  - Antonio Capuano – Dark Love (L'amore buio)
  - Daniele Gaglianone – Pietro
  - Pasquale Scimeca & Nennella Buonaiuto with the collaboration of Tonino Guerra – Malavoglia
- 2012: Marco Tullio Giordana, Sandro Petraglia & Stefano Rulli – Piazza Fontana: The Italian Conspiracy
  - Carlo Verdone, Pasquale Plastino & Maruska Albertazzi – A Flat for Three
  - Daniele Vicari & Laura Paolucci – Diaz - Don't Clean Up This Blood
  - Paolo Sorrentino & Umberto Contarello – This Must Be the Place
  - Francesco Bruni – Scialla! (Stai sereno)
- 2013: Roberto Andò & Angelo Pasquini – Long Live Freedom
  - Marco Bellocchio, Veronica Raimo & Stefano Rulli – Dormant Beauty
  - Giuseppe Piccioni & Francesca Manieri – The Red and the Blue
  - Paolo Sorrentino & Umberto Contarello – The Great Beauty
  - Giuseppe Tornatore – La migliore offerta
- 2014: Francesco Bruni, Francesco Piccolo & Paolo Virzì – Human Capital
  - Daniele Luchetti, Sandro Petraglia, Stefano Rulli and Caterina Venturini – Those Happy Years
  - Nicola Lusuardi, Marco Simon Puccioni and Heidrun Schleef – Like the Wind
  - Asia Argento and Barbara Alberti – Misunderstood
  - Alice Rohrwacher – The Wonders
- 2015: Francesco Munzi, Fabrizio Ruggirello, Maurizio Braucci and Gioacchino Criaco – Black Souls
  - Nanni Moretti, Francesco Piccolo and Valia Santella – Mia Madre
  - Francesca Archibugi and Francesco Piccolo – An Italian Name
  - Matteo Garrone, Edoardo Albinati, Ugo Chiti and Massimo Gaudioso – Tale of Tales
  - Paolo Sorrentino – Youth
- 2016: Paolo Virzì & Francesca Archibugi – Like Crazy
  - Sergio Rubini, Carla Cavalluzzi and Diego De Silva – Let's Talk
  - Nicola Guaglianone and Menotti – They Call Me Jeeg
  - Filippo Bologna, Paolo Costella, Paolo Genovese, Paola Mammini and Rolando Ravello – Perfect Strangers
  - Francesca Marciano, Stefano Mordini and Valia Santella – Pericle
- 2017: Francesco Bruni – Friends by Chance
  - Claudio Giovannesi, Filippo Gravino and Antonella Lattanzi – Fiore
  - Margaret Mazzantini – Fortunata
  - Ugo Chiti, Gianfranco Cabiddu, Salvatore De Mola and Francesco Marino – La stoffa dei sogni
  - Alex Infascelli and Francesca Manieri – Piccoli crimini coniugali
- 2018: Paolo Sorrentino and Umberto Contarello – Loro
  - Gabriele Muccino, Paolo Costella and Sabrina Impacciatore – There's No Place Like Home
  - Matteo Garrone, Ugo Chiti and Massimo Gaudioso – Dogman
  - Leonardo Di Costanzo, Maurizio Braucci and Bruno Oliviero – The Intruder
  - Susanna Nicchiarelli – Nico, 1988
- 2019: Marco Bellocchio, Ludovica Rampoldi, Valia Santella, Francesco Piccolo and Francesco La Licata – The Traitor
  - Francesca Marciano, Valia Santella, Valeria Golino and Walter Siti – Euphoria
  - Edoardo De Angelis and Umberto Contarello – The Vice of Hope
  - Claudio Giovannesi, Roberto Saviano and Maurizio Braucci – Piranhas
  - Roberto Andò, Angelo Pasquini and Giacomo Bendotti – The Stolen Caravaggio

== 2020s ==
- 2020: Damiano and Fabio D'Innocenzo – Bad Tales
  - Mario Martone and Ippolita Di Majo - The Mayor of Rione Sanità
  - Gianni Romoli, Silvia Ranfagni and Ferzan Özpetek - The Goddess of Fortune
  - Pietro Marcello and Maurizio Braucci - Martin Eden
  - Umberto Contarello and Sara Mosetti - Volare
- 2021: Francesco Bruni and Kim Rossi Stuart – Everything's Gonna Be Alright
  - Michael Zampino, Heidrun Schleef and Giampaolo Rugo – Governance - Il prezzo del potere
  - Emma Dante, Elena Stancanelli and Giorgio Vasta – The Macaluso Sisters
  - Sydney Sibilia and Francesca Manieri – Rose Island
  - Pietro Castellitto – The Predators
- 2022: Mario Martone and Ippolita Di Majo – Nostalgia and The King of Laughter
  - Leonardo Di Costanzo, Bruno Oliviero and Valia Santella – The Inner Cage
  - Paolo Sorrentino – The Hand of God
  - Andrea Ozza, Maurizio De Giovanni and Alessandro Gassmann – Il silenzio grande
  - Monica Zapelli and Donatella Di Pietrantonio – A Girl Returned
- 2023: Marco Bellocchio, Susanna Nicchiarelli, Edoardo Albinati and Daniela Ceselli – Kidnapped
  - Kim Rossi Stuart and Massimo Gaudioso – Brado
  - Francesca Marciano, Valia Santella, Nanni Moretti and Federica Pontremoli – A Brighter Tomorrow
  - Armando Festa and Sydney Sibilia – Mixed by Erry
  - Francesca Archibugi, Paolo Giordano, Francesco Piccolo and Paolo Virzì – Siccità

== See also ==
- Cinema of Italy
