= Sandro Petraglia =

Italian screenwriter (born 1947)

- Born: 19 April 1947 (age 79); Rome, Italy
- Occupation: Screenwriter
- Years active: 1971–present

Sandro Petraglia (Italian pronunciation: [ˈsandro peˈtraʎʎa]; born 19 April 1947) is an Italian screenwriter. He began his career in the early 1970s as a film critic, writing for the May 68–inspired film magazine Ombre rosse. During this time, Petraglia first met with his future screenwriting collaborator Stefano Rulli.

== Filmography ==
=== Film ===
Year	Title	Notes
1975	Matti da slegare	Director only Documentary
1983	Sweet Body of Bianca	
1984	The Mass Is Ended	
1987	Dolce assenza	
1987	Julia and Julia	
1988	It's Happening Tomorrow	
1989	Étoile	
1989	Forever Mery	
1990	Pummarò	
1991	The Yes Man	
1991	The Invisible Wall	
1992	The Stolen Children	
1992	Ambrogio	
1993	The Storm Is Coming	
1993	Fiorile	
1994	The Bull	
1995	Policeman	
1995	School	
1995	Who Killed Pasolini?	
1996	My Generation	
1996	Vesna Goes Fast	
1997	Marianna Ucrìa	
1997	The Truce	
1997	Auguri professore	Story only
1998	Little Teachers	
1999	La guerra degli Antò	
1999	The Lost Lover	
2001	Domenica	
2003	The Best of Youth	
2004	The Keys to the House	
2005	Once You're Born You Can No Longer Hide	
2005	Romanzo Criminale	
2007	My Brother Is an Only Child	
2007	The Girl by the Lake	
2007	Piano, solo	
2008	A Perfect Day	
2009	The Front Line	
2010	La nostra vita	
2012	Piazza Fontana: The Italian Conspiracy	
2013	Siberian Education	
2013	Those Happy Years	
2015	Suburra	
2016	Non c'è più religione	
2018	Io sono Tempesta	

=== Television ===
Year	Title	Notes
1977	Il gabbiano	Television film
1979	The Cinema Machine	5 episodes, also director Documentary
1986	Attentato al Papa	2 episodes
1986	Mino	4 episodes
1986	Fuori scena	Television film
1987–1995	La piovra	30 episodes
1988	Una vittoria	Television film
1990	Vita dei castelli	3 episodes
1991	The Mysteries of the Dark Jungle	3 episodes
1991–1993	Felipe ha gli occhi azzurri	5 episodes
1994	Michele alla guerra	Television film
1997	Don Milani - Il priore di Barbiana	2 episodes
1998	Più leggero non basta	Television film
1999	La vita che verrà	4 episodes
2001	Almost America	2 episodes
2001	Compagni di scuola	
2002	Perlasca – Un eroe Italiano	2 episodes
2004	La omicidi	6 episodes
2005	Cefalonia	2 episodes
2005	Padri e figli	6 episodes
2008	O' professore	2 episodes
2010	Longlasting Youth	4 episodes
2011	Violetta	2 episodes
2013	Volare - La grande storia di Domenico Modugno	Television film
2014	La strada dritta	2 episodes
2014–2015	Braccialetti rossi	7 episodes
2015	L'Oriana	2 episodes
2015	Questo è il mio paese	Episode: "Episodio 1"
2020	La guerra è finita	TV miniseries

== Awards and nominations ==
Year	Award	Category	Title	Result
1975	Berlin International Film Festival	FIPRESCI Prize	Matti da slegare	Won
1975	Berlin International Film Festival	OCIC Award	Matti da slegare	Won
1979	Berlin International Film Festival	FIPRESCI Prize	The Cinema Machine	Won
1986	Golden Ciak	Best Screenplay	The Mass Is Ended	Won
1986	David di Donatello	Best Screenplay	The Mass Is Ended	Nominated
1986	Nastro d'argento	Best Screenplay	The Mass Is Ended	Nominated
1986	Nastro d'argento	Best Original Story	The Mass Is Ended	Nominated
1988	Golden Ciak	Best Screenplay	It's Happening Tomorrow	Nominated
1990	Golden Ciak	Best Screenplay	Forever Mery	Nominated
1991	David di Donatello	Best Screenplay	The Yes Man	Won
1992	Golden Ciak	Best Screenplay	The Yes Man	Won
1992	Nastro d'argento	Best Screenplay	The Yes Man	Nominated
1992	Nastro d'argento	Best Original Story	The Invisible Wall	Won
1992	Golden Ciak	Best Screenplay	The Invisible Wall	Nominated
1992	David di Donatello	Best Screenplay	The Invisible Wall	Nominated
1992	David di Donatello	Best Screenplay	The Stolen Children	Nominated
1993	Nastro d'argento	Best Screenplay	The Stolen Children	Won
1993	Golden Ciak	Best Screenplay	The Stolen Children	Won
1995	Nastro d'argento	Best Original Story	The Bull	Nominated
1996	Golden Ciak	Best Screenplay	School	Nominated
1996	Nastro d'argento	Best Screenplay	School	Nominated
1997	Italian Golden Globe	Best Screenplay	Marianna Ucrìa	Won
1997	David di Donatello	Best Screenplay	The Truce	Nominated
1997	Golden Ciak	Best Screenplay	My Generation	Nominated
2003	European Film Awards	Best Screenwriter	The Best of Youth	Nominated
2004	David di Donatello	Best Screenplay	The Best of Youth	Won
2004	Nastro d'argento	Best Screenplay	The Best of Youth	Won
2004	Italian Golden Globe	Best Screenplay	The Best of Youth	Won
2004	Golden Ciak	Best Screenplay	The Best of Youth	Nominated
2005	Golden Ciak	Best Screenplay	The Keys to the House	Won
2005	David di Donatello	Best Screenplay	The Keys to the House	Nominated
2005	Nastro d'argento	Best Screenplay	The Keys to the House	Nominated
2006	David di Donatello	Best Screenplay	Romanzo Criminale	Won
2006	Golden Ciak	Best Screenplay	Romanzo Criminale	Nominated
2006	Nastro d'argento	Best Screenplay	Romanzo Criminale	Nominated
2007	David di Donatello	Best Screenplay	My Brother is an Only Child	Won
2007	Golden Ciak	Best Screenplay	My Brother is an Only Child	Nominated
2008	Nastro d'argento	Best Screenplay	My Brother is an Only Child	Won
2008	Nastro d'argento	Best Screenplay	The Girl by the Lake	Won
2008	David di Donatello	Best Screenplay	The Girl by the Lake	Won
2008	Italian Golden Globe	Best Screenplay	The Girl by the Lake	Won
2008	Golden Ciak	Best Screenplay	The Girl by the Lake	Won
2010	Nastro d'argento	Best Screenplay	La nostra vita	Nominated
2011	David di Donatello	Best Screenplay	La nostra vita	Nominated
2012	Nastro d'argento	Best Screenplay	Piazza Fontana: The Italian Conspiracy	Won
2012	David di Donatello	Best Screenplay	Piazza Fontana: The Italian Conspiracy	Nominated
2012	Golden Ciak	Best Screenplay	Piazza Fontana: The Italian Conspiracy	Nominated
2012	Italian Golden Globe	Best Screenplay	Piazza Fontana: The Italian Conspiracy	Nominated
2014	Nastro d'Argento	Best Screenplay	Those Happy Years	Nominated
