= The Best Offer =

2013 film directed by Giuseppe Tornatore

- Theatrical release poster
- Italian: La migliore offerta
- Directed by: Giuseppe Tornatore
- Written by: Giuseppe Tornatore
- Produced by: Isabella Cocuzza; Arturo Paglia
- Starring: Geoffrey Rush; Jim Sturgess; Sylvia Hoeks; Donald Sutherland
- Cinematography: Fabio Zamarion
- Edited by: Massimo Quaglia
- Music by: Ennio Morricone
- Production companies: Paco Cinematografica; Warner Bros. Entertainment Italia
- Distributed by: Warner Bros. Pictures
- Release date: 1 January 2013
- Running time: 131 minutes
- Country: Italy
- Language: English
- Budget: €13.5 million ($18 million)
- Box office: $20.9 million

The Best Offer (Italian: La migliore offerta – entitled Deception in the UK) is a 2013 English-language Italian psychological thriller film written and directed by Giuseppe Tornatore. The film stars Geoffrey Rush as Virgil Oldman, a meticulous and reclusive art auctioneer who becomes entangled in a mysterious romantic relationship with an agoraphobic heiress, Claire Ibbetson (Sylvia Hoeks). Jim Sturgess and Donald Sutherland appear in supporting roles. The music score was composed by Ennio Morricone.

The film premiered in Italy on 1 January 2013 and received a limited release in the United States a year later. It won six David di Donatello Awards, including Best Film and Best Director, and Morricone received the European Film Award for Best Composer. Critical reception was mixed.

== Plot ==
Virgil Oldman (Geoffrey Rush) is an esteemed but eccentric managing director of a preeminent auction house. A lifelong bachelor who avoids physical contact and refuses to use a mobile phone, he wears gloves at all times except when handling artwork. Behind his impeccable professional reputation, Virgil secretly operates a long-running scam: with the help of his friend Billy Whistler (Donald Sutherland), he acquires priceless female portraits at auction by having them misattributed to lesser artists, then buys them cheaply through Billy acting as a shill. Over the years, Virgil has amassed a vast private collection of masterpieces worth millions, which he keeps hidden in a secret vault and admires in solitude.

Virgil is hired by Claire Ibbetson (Sylvia Hoeks), a young heiress suffering from severe agoraphobia, to appraise and auction the extensive art and antiques collection left to her by her late parents. Claire refuses to meet Virgil in person, communicating only through phone calls and notes left with the villa's caretaker, Fred (Philip Jackson). Intrigued by her reclusiveness, Virgil becomes increasingly obsessed with Claire, and the two begin a tentative relationship conducted through a locked door.

During his visits to the villa, Virgil discovers a collection of scattered mechanical parts bearing the mark of the 18th-century inventor Jacques de Vaucanson. He enlists the help of Robert (Jim Sturgess), a young and talented restorer of mechanical devices, to reassemble the pieces into an automaton. Robert, who is successful with women, also offers Virgil advice on how to befriend Claire and navigate his growing feelings for her.

As Virgil and Claire grow closer, Claire gradually overcomes her fear and eventually reveals herself to him. Their relationship deepens, and Virgil, for the first time in his life, falls genuinely in love. He shows Claire his secret vault of paintings, and she tells him that whatever happens, her love for him is real. Virgil decides to retire from the auction business and plans a final farewell auction in London.

After the successful London auction, Virgil returns home to find Claire and his entire collection gone. The vault is empty except for the restored automaton, which plays a recorded message from Robert: "There is always something authentic concealed in every forgery," echoing Virgil's own words. Virgil realizes he has been the victim of an elaborate con orchestrated by Robert, Claire, and Billy. A portrait of Claire, painted by Billy, has been left behind with a dedication: "With love and gratitude."

Devastated, Virgil cannot report the crime because his collection was acquired through fraudulent means. He later learns from a woman with savant syndrome who frequents a café opposite the villa that she is the real owner, and that she had rented the property to "an engineer"—Robert. She informs Virgil that "Claire" had left the villa hundreds of times, contrary to her claims of agoraphobia.

After spending months recovering in a psychiatric hospital, Virgil travels to Prague and visits a restaurant filled with clocks and mechanical gearwork that Claire had once described as a place where she was happy. He sits alone at a table, waiting.

== Cast ==
- Geoffrey Rush as Virgil Oldman, a renowned auctioneer and art authenticator
- Jim Sturgess as Robert, a mechanical restorer and illusionist
- Sylvia Hoeks as Claire Ibbetson, a reclusive heiress
- Donald Sutherland as Billy Whistler, an artist and Virgil's longtime associate
- Philip Jackson as Fred, caretaker of the Ibbetson villa
- Dermot Crowley as Lambert, Virgil's main assistant
- Liya Kebede as Sarah, Robert's girlfriend and an art restorer
- Kiruna Stamell as Claire, the real owner of the villa (the woman in the bar)
- Anton Alexander as a real estate agent
- John Benfield as a barman
- Miles Richardson as the Steirereck Maître d'

== Production ==
=== Development ===
Giuseppe Tornatore wrote the original screenplay for The Best Offer, merging two narrative concepts he had developed over more than twenty years. Tornatore wrote the script in English to expand the film's international appeal, marking his English-language debut. Geoffrey Rush was Tornatore's first choice for the lead role; the director envisioned him while writing the screenplay and later described Rush as "a synthesis of Marlon Brando and Marcello Mastroianni." Sylvia Hoeks, then relatively unknown internationally, was cast by Tornatore after other actresses refused the role due to the character not being on screen for much of the movie.

=== Filming ===
Principal photography began on 30 April 2012 in Trieste, Italy, marking Tornatore's return to the city where he had previously filmed The Unknown Woman (2006). Filming took place over five to six weeks in the Friuli-Venezia Giulia region. Additional Italian locations included Milan, Bolzano, Ora, and Merano in South Tyrol. International filming took place in Vienna and Prague.

The primary villa location was Villa Colloredo Mels Mainardi in Gorizzo di Camino al Tagliamento, Udine, which served as the Ibbetson residence. The bar overlooking the villa is located in Via Giorgio Galatti in Trieste.

=== Music ===
The original score was composed by Ennio Morricone in another collaboration between him and Tornatore. Morricone's score won the David di Donatello and the European Film Award for Best Composer.

== Release ==
The Best Offer premiered in Italian cinemas on 1 January 2013, distributed by Warner Bros. Pictures Italia. The film was released in the United Kingdom under the title Deception on 21 March 2014 by Momentum Pictures. In the United States, IFC Films gave the film a limited theatrical release beginning 1 January 2014.

The film was released on DVD and Blu-ray in Italy on 15 May 2013 by Warner Bros.

== Reception ==
=== Box office ===
In Italy, The Best Offer grossed approximately €9.1 million (about $12 million). Internationally, the film earned approximately $8.8 million across various markets, with strong performances in Spain ($2.4 million). The worldwide theatrical gross reached $20.9 million.

=== Critical response ===
On Rotten Tomatoes, the film has an approval rating of 56% based on 32 reviews. On Metacritic, the film holds a score of 49 out of 100 based on 17 critics, indicating "mixed or average reviews".

Geoffrey Rush's performance received praise. Deborah Young of The Hollywood Reporter called the film "astutely written" and commended Rush's "sensitive, never pandering performance". Betsy Sharkey of the Los Angeles Times described it as a "finely layered mystery" with "classy, atmospheric, onion-peel of a mystery."

Conversely, Sheila O'Malley of RogerEbert.com awarded the film 1.5 out of 4 stars, criticizing a script which "keeps insisting on explaining its own symbolism and subtext, to make sure we get how deep the thing is." Andrew Pulver of The Guardian rated it 2/5 stars and called it "stiff" and "convoluted." Stephen Holden of The New York Times found the central romance "dull" and the intrigue "superfluous."

== Accolades ==
Awards
Award	Category	Recipients and nominees	Result
58th David di Donatello Awards	Best Film	Giuseppe Tornatore	Won
58th David di Donatello Awards	Best Director	Giuseppe Tornatore	Won
58th David di Donatello Awards	Best Script	Giuseppe Tornatore	Nominated
58th David di Donatello Awards	Best Producer	Isabella Cocuzza and Arturo Paglia	Nominated
58th David di Donatello Awards	Best Cinematography	Fabio Zamarion	Nominated
58th David di Donatello Awards	Best Production Design	Maurizio Sabatini and Raffaella Giovannetti	Won
58th David di Donatello Awards	Best Costumes	Maurizio Millenotti	Won
58th David di Donatello Awards	Best Make-up	Luigi Rocchetti	Nominated
58th David di Donatello Awards	Best Hairstyling	Stefano Ceccarelli	Nominated
58th David di Donatello Awards	Best Editing	Massimo Quaglia	Nominated
58th David di Donatello Awards	Best Sound	Gilberto Martinelli	Nominated
58th David di Donatello Awards	Best Score	Ennio Morricone	Won
58th David di Donatello Awards	Youngs' David	Giuseppe Tornatore	Won
68th Nastro d'Argento Awards	Best Director	Giuseppe Tornatore	Won
68th Nastro d'Argento Awards	Best Producer	Isabella Cocuzza and Arturo Paglia	Won
68th Nastro d'Argento Awards	Best Screenplay	Giuseppe Tornatore	Nominated
68th Nastro d'Argento Awards	Best Cinematography	Fabio Zamarion	Nominated
68th Nastro d'Argento Awards	Best Scenography	Maurizio Sabatini and Raffaella Giovannetti	Won
68th Nastro d'Argento Awards	Best Costumes	Maurizio Millenotti	Won
68th Nastro d'Argento Awards	Best Editor	Massimo Quaglia	Won
68th Nastro d'Argento Awards	Best Sound	Gilberto Martinelli	Nominated
68th Nastro d'Argento Awards	Best Score	Ennio Morricone	Won
53rd Italian Golden Globe	Best Cinematography	Fabio Zamarion	Nominated
53rd Italian Golden Globe	Best Music	Ennio Morricone	Nominated
Ciak d'oro Awards	Best Film	Giuseppe Tornatore	Won
Ciak d'oro Awards	Best Director	Giuseppe Tornatore	Won
Ciak d'oro Awards	Best Editing	Massimo Quaglia	Won
Ciak d'oro Awards	Best Costumes	Maurizio Millenotti	Won
26th European Film Awards	Best Film	Giuseppe Tornatore	Nominated
26th European Film Awards	Best Director	Giuseppe Tornatore	Nominated
26th European Film Awards	Best Screenwriter	Giuseppe Tornatore	Nominated
26th European Film Awards	Best Composer	Ennio Morricone	Won
26th European Film Awards	People's Choice Award	Giuseppe Tornatore	Nominated
