= The Best of Youth =

2003 Italian epic melodrama film by Marco Tullio Gioardana

- Italian theatrical release poster
- Italian: La meglio gioventù
- Directed by: Marco Tullio Giordana
- Screenplay by: Sandro Petraglia; Stefano Rulli
- Story by: Sandro Petraglia; Stefano Rulli
- Produced by: Angelo Barbagallo
- Starring: Luigi Lo Cascio; Alessio Boni; Jasmine Trinca; Adriana Asti; Sonia Bergamasco; Fabrizio Gifuni; Maya Sansa; Valentina Carnelutti; Andrea Tidona; Lidia Vitale; Claudio Gioè; Paolo Bonanni
- Cinematography: Roberto Forza
- Edited by: Roberto Missiroli
- Production company: Rai Fiction
- Distributed by: 01 Distribution
- Release dates: 20 May 2003 (Cannes); 20 June 2003 (Italy; Act I); 27 June 2003 (Italy; Act II)
- Running time: 366 minutes (theatrical version); 382 minutes (TV version)
- Country: Italy
- Language: Italian
- Budget: L.12 billion
- Box office: $2.7 million

The Best Of Youth (Italian: La Meglio Gioventù) is a 2003 Italian epic drama film directed by Marco Tullio Giordana and written by Sandro Petraglia and Stefano Rulli. A family saga set in Italy from 1966 through 2003, it chronicles the life of the middle-class Carati family, focusing primarily on brothers Nicola (Luigi Lo Cascio) and Matteo (Alessio Boni) as their life paths separate during youth, encompassing major political and social events in post–World War II Italian history.

Originally conceived as a Rai television miniseries, it premiered at the 2003 Cannes Film Festival, where it won the Prize Un Certain Regard. It was then given a theatrical release in Italy as two 3-hour films (titled Act I and Act II), before being aired with broader success on Rai 1 in a slightly longer four-episode television version later that year. In the U.S., the film was released by Miramax in its theatrical version.

The title of the film, an ungrammatical rendition of La Miglior Gioventù ("The Best Youth/Young People"), comes from the title of a 1954 Friulian language poetry collection by Pier Paolo Pasolini, who in turn borrowed it from a line of Alpini World War II song Sul Ponte Di Perati; here, Giordana uses it to refer to his generation, which is also the main characters' one, made up of those young people who participated in the Sessantotto.

== Plot ==
=== Summer 1966 ===
Two brothers go their separate ways after attempting to rescue a young girl, Giorgia (Jasmine Trinca), from an abusive sanitarium. The brothers are Matteo and Nicola Carati (Alessio Boni and Luigi Lo Cascio). Their parents are Angelo (Andrea Tidona) and Adriana (Adriana Asti), their older sister is Giovanna (Lidia Vitale), and their younger sister is Francesca (Valentina Carnelutti). Their friends, their lovers and others drift through, including Giorgia who struggles with mental issues, but whose life seems to follow in parallel.

Matteo walks out of his first exam, while Nicola passes an exam on his way to qualifying as a doctor (and will pursue a career in psychiatry). Matteo takes mental patients for walks to help them begin to feel normal and takes a particular interest in his patient Giorgia. Noticing that Giorgia has been wounded by electroconvulsive therapy, he decides to remove her from the institution and take her along with him and Nicola—who are about to go on a trip to Norway.

Eventually, Giorgia is captured by the police and taken back to the asylum. Matteo, filled with sadness and depression, returns to Rome and joins the army. Nicola continues to Norway and gets a job as a lumberjack. The brothers meet again in Florence just after the 1966 Arno River flood. Here, Nicola meets a university student, Giulia (Sonia Bergamasco).

=== February 1968 ===
Nicola and Giulia are living together in Turin, but the two do not marry.

=== 1974 ===
Matteo leaves the army and joins the police force. During this time, Matteo shows signs of continuing depression and anger. He accepts an assignment in Sicily, a place corrupted by the Mafia. Meanwhile, Nicola and Giulia conceive and care for Sara, their daughter.

=== 1977 ===
In Sicily, Matteo meets a photographer named Mirella (Maya Sansa) in a caffè. She wants to be a librarian, and he advises her to work at a beautiful library in Rome.

Because of his temper, Matteo is forced to leave Sicily. He decides to reside in Rome but refuses to visit his mother.

Meanwhile, Nicola becomes a psychiatrist, and works to eliminate the abuse and maltreatment of patients in mental hospitals. He finds Giorgia in one of these hospitals. She is tied to a bed in inhumane conditions, does not talk, and shows fear of being touched by others. After some time, Giulia gets drawn into a secret Red Brigades cell. One night, she leaves Nicola and Sara and disappears into the terrorist underground.

=== 1983 ===
Years later Matteo walks into that same library and sees Mirella for the second time. They fall in love, and one evening, make love in a car. Eventually he pushes her away.

=== December 1983 ===
Mirella meets with Matteo with news for him, but he behaves harshly and forces her to leave. On New Year's Eve, Matteo decides to finally visit his mother. Everyone is there to celebrate. Instead of waiting for the traditional toasts, however, Matteo decides to leave early and, at midnight, jumps off the balcony of his apartment and kills himself.

The family is devastated by the tragedy. No longer motivated, Nicola's mother quits her teaching job and lives a life in solitude in Rome. Nicola, feeling that he could have saved Matteo and not wanting to make the same mistake again, arranges for the capture of Giulia to prevent her from killing someone else or from getting killed. She is sentenced to 17 years in jail. During her jail term, Nicola visits Giulia and proposes to her but is rejected.

=== Spring 1992 ===
Nicola finds a photograph of Matteo taken by Mirella. He is encouraged by Giorgia to meet with Mirella which, after some hesitation, he agrees to do. When he meets Mirella, Nicola learns about her son (Andrea) and that Matteo was the father. Nicola breaks this exciting news to his mother and they visit Mirella and the boy on the small island of Stromboli. Inspired by new meaning in her life, Nicola's mother decides to stay with Mirella and her grandson.

=== Spring 1995 ===
Nicola and his friends acquire and plan the reconstruction of an old villa house in Tuscany. Giulia (out of jail) meets Francesca but chooses not to talk to Sara, watching her from afar. Meanwhile, Sara, now in her early twenties, is still struggling with the poor choices her mother has made. She decides to move to Rome to study art conservation and becomes engaged to Mimmo. During this time, Nicola finds out his mother has died and, as a result, travels to Stromboli to visit Mirella and pay his respects.

=== Spring 2000 ===
Having finally moved past the death of Matteo, Nicola and Mirella fall in love. Sara, now happy and strong, is encouraged by Nicola to confront her mother and try to patch things up. Giulia, in desperate need of love, embraces Sara, but is not ready to open up completely.

=== 2003 ===
The film ends with Matteo's son, Andrea, visiting Norway, specifically North Cape, which is where his father and Nicola ventured to go at the beginning of the movie, but never completed their journey.

== Cast ==
- Luigi Lo Cascio as Nicola Carati
- Alessio Boni as Matteo Carati
- Jasmine Trinca as Giorgia Esposti
- Adriana Asti as Adriana Carati
- Sonia Bergamasco as Giulia Monfalco
- Fabrizio Gifuni as Carlo Tommasi
- Maya Sansa as Mirella Utano
- Valentina Carnelutti as Francesca Carati
  - Nila Carnelutti as Francesca Carati at 8
- Andrea Tidona as Angelo Carati
- Lidia Vitale as Giovanna Carati
- Claudio Gioè as Vitale Micavi
- Paolo Bonanni as Luigi
- Giovanni Scifoni as Berto
- Riccardo Scamarcio as Andrea Utano
  - Francesco La Macchia as Andrea Utano at 6
- Camilla Filippi as Sara Carati
  - Greta Cavuoti as Sara Carati at 8
  - Sara Pavoncello as Sara Carati at 5
- Mario Schiano as medicine professor
- Michele Melega as literature professor
- Thérèse Vadem as Therese
- Stefano Abbati as pusher
- Giovanni Martorana as Maghrebi
- Paolo De Vita as Don Vito
- Mimmo Mignemi as Giorgia's father
- Domenico Centamore as Officer Enzo
- Pippo Montalbano as Police Chief in Palermo
- Gaspare Cucinella as 'Viddanu
- Dario Veca as butcher
- Nicola Vigilante as nurse
- Marcello Prayer as Second Lieutenant
- Walter Da Pozzo as Officer Mario
- Krum De Nicola as Brigo
- Maurizio Di Carmine as terrorist
- Roberto Accornero as President of the Court in Turin
- Fabio Camilli as Tangentopoli inmate
- Antonello Puglisi as priest in Palermo
- Patrizia Punzo as gallery manager
- Emilia Marra as doctor

== Production ==
Principal photography began in March 2002, taking place mainly in Florence, Turin and Collegno in the following months. On 26 June 2002, filming moved to Stromboli, lasting three days. Filming also took place in Rome and North Cape, Norway.

== Release ==
Originally set for a television broadcast on Rai 2, The Best of Youth was bought by Rai 1 and then indefinitely shelved from its scheduled air date of fall 2002. Set for February 2003, it was delayed again after TV spots had already aired. Freedom of expression association Articolo 21, liberi di... accused Rai 1 director Agostino Saccà and his successor Fabrizio Del Noce of making a politically charged use of public television in favor of the Berlusconi government (Editto Bulgaro). In April, the film was selected for the Cannes Film Festival, where it had its world premiere on 20 May 2003, competing in the Un Certain Regard sidebar. Here, it received the Prize Un Certain Regard along with widespread critical acclaim, credited as having rekindled Rai's interest, who decided to give the film a theatrical release before airing it.

Due to its extensive runtime, The Best of Youth was divided in two parts for its theatrical release in Italy, premiering on 7 and 8 June 2003 at the Taormina Film Festival: the first part (Italian: Atto primo, lit. 'Act I') was released by 01 Distribution on 20 June, followed by the second one (Italian: Atto secondo, lit. 'Act II') on 27 June. A four-part version, with an additional 20 minutes of running time, was finally broadcast from 7 to 15 December 2003 on Rai 1 at 8:45 pm:

No.	Title	Length	Opening credits song	Original release date	Italy viewers (millions)	Ratings share
1	"La meglio gioventù - Prima parte"	98 minutes	"The House of the Rising Sun" by the Animals	December 7, 2003	7.3	28.77%
2	"La meglio gioventù - Seconda parte"	94 minutes	"Suzanne" by Leonard Cohen	December 8, 2003	6.5	23.86%
3	"La meglio gioventù - Terza parte"	94 minutes	"Who Wants to Live Forever" by Queen	December 14, 2003	N/A	TBA
4	"La meglio gioventù - Quarta parte"	96 minutes	–	December 15, 2003	6.7	TBA

== Reception ==
On Rotten Tomatoes, the film has an approval rating of 94%, with an average rating of 8.40/10, based on 63 reviews, the critic consensus says that the film "earns its 6 hours running time by telling an engrossing story with compelling characters." On Metacritic, the film has a score (using a weighted average) of 89 out of 100, indicating "universal acclaim". According to film critic Peter Bradshaw, the film falls within the tradition of several films that cover expansive times of Italian history through the story of one family, such as Rocco and His Brothers and The Leopard.

In a four-star review, Roger Ebert wrote, "No good movie is too long, just as no bad movie is short enough. I dropped outside of time and was carried along by the narrative flow; when the film was over, I had no particular desire to leave the theater, and would happily have stayed another three hours. The two-hour limit on most films makes them essentially short stories. “The Best of Youth” is a novel."

Ed Gonzalez, writing for Slant Magazine, described the film as an "epic elegy to family and country is a towering work of narrative fiction." The San Francisco Chronicle said it was "so in-depth, so appealing, so easy to sit through and so anomalously grand scale that few who see it will ever forget it", adding it was "a full meal in a world of snacks." The New York Daily News wrote, "After all the observations on heartache, politics, art, commerce, passion, identity, mortality, even mental health, six hours begin to seem downright compact."

=== Accolades ===
Award	Date of ceremony	Category	Recipient(s)	Result	Ref.
Belgian Syndicate of Cinema Critics	12 January 2004	Grand Prix	The Best of Youth	Won	
Cannes Film Festival	25 May 2003	Un Certain Regard Award	The Best of Youth	Won	
César Awards	21 February 2004	Best Film from the EU	The Best of Youth	Nominated	
David di Donatello Awards	14 April 2004	Best Film	The Best of Youth	Won	
David di Donatello Awards	14 April 2004	Best Director	Marco Tullio Giordana	Won	
David di Donatello Awards	14 April 2004	Best Actor	Luigi Lo Cascio	Nominated	
David di Donatello Awards	14 April 2004	Best Supporting Actor	Fabrizio Gifuni	Nominated	
David di Donatello Awards	14 April 2004	Best Supporting Actress	Jasmine Trinca	Nominated	
David di Donatello Awards	14 April 2004	Best Producer	Angelo Barbagallo	Won	
David di Donatello Awards	14 April 2004	Best Screenplay	Sandro Petraglia and Stefano Rulli	Won	
David di Donatello Awards	14 April 2004	Best Editing	Roberto Missiroli	Won	
David di Donatello Awards	14 April 2004	Best Production Design	Franco Ceraolo	Nominated	
David di Donatello Awards	14 April 2004	Best Costumes	Elisabetta Montaldo	Nominated	
David di Donatello Awards	14 April 2004	Best Sound	Fulgenzio Ceccon	Won	
European Film Awards	6 December 2003	Best Director	Marco Tullio Giordana	Nominated	
European Film Awards	6 December 2003	Best Actor	Luigi Lo Cascio	Nominated	
European Film Awards	6 December 2003	Best Screenwriter	Sandro Petraglia and Stefano Rulli	Nominated	
Film Fest Gent	18 October 2003	Grand Prix	The Best of Youth	Nominated	
Globo d'Oro Awards	3 July 2004	Best Film	The Best of Youth	Nominated	
Globo d'Oro Awards	3 July 2004	Best Director	Marco Tullio Giordana	Won	
Globo d'Oro Awards	3 July 2004	Best Actor	Luigi Lo Cascio	Nominated	
Globo d'Oro Awards	3 July 2004	Best Actress	Sonia Bergamasco	Nominated	
Globo d'Oro Awards	3 July 2004	Best Screenplay	Sandro Petraglia and Stefano Rulli	Won	
Globo d'Oro Awards	3 July 2004	Special Jury Award	Adriana Asti	Won	
Nastro d'Argento Awards	19 June 2004	Best Director	Marco Tullio Giordana	Won	
Nastro d'Argento Awards	19 June 2004	Best Producer	Angelo Barbagallo	Won	
Nastro d'Argento Awards	19 June 2004	Best Actor	Alessio Boni; Fabrizio Gifuni; Luigi Lo Cascio; Andrea Tidona	Won	
Nastro d'Argento Awards	19 June 2004	Best Actress	Adriana Asti; Sonia Bergamasco; Maya Sansa; Jasmine Trinca	Won	
Nastro d'Argento Awards	19 June 2004	Best Screenplay	Sandro Petraglia and Stefano Rulli	Won	
Nastro d'Argento Awards	19 June 2004	Best Editing	Roberto Missiroli	Won	
Nastro d'Argento Awards	19 June 2004	Best Costume Design	Elisabetta Montaldo	Nominated	
Nastro d'Argento Awards	19 June 2004	Best Sound	Fulgenzio Ceccon	Won	
National Board of Review Awards	3 December 2003	Top Ten Foreign Films	The Best of Youth	Won	
Palm Springs International Film Festival	19 January 2004	Audience Award (Best Narrative Feature)	The Best of Youth	Won	
Rotterdam International Film Festival	1 February 2004	KPN Audience Award	The Best of Youth	Won	
Seattle International Film Festival	30 June 2004	Best Director	Marco Tullio Giordana	Won	

== See also ==
- List of longest films
