= Il gabbiano =

- Directed by: Marco Bellocchio
- Written by: Marco Bellocchio; Lù Leone; Sandro Petraglia; Stefano Rulli
- Starring: Laura Betti
- Cinematography: Tonino Nardi
- Edited by: Silvano Agosti
- Music by: Nicola Piovani
- Release date: 1977
- Language: Italian

Il gabbiano (Italian pronunciation: [il ɡabˈbjaːno]; i.e. "The seagull") is a 1977 Italian drama film written and directed by Marco Bellocchio. It is loosely based on the Anton Chekhov's drama play The Seagull.

The film was screened out of competition at the 1977 Cannes Film Festival. For her performance Pamela Villoresi won a Grolla d'oro.

== Plot ==
A young writer finds himself trapped between his mother (Laura Betti), a horrible actress, and the knowledge that he has only mediocre talent as a playwright and almost no character. After the young man suffers the loss of his mistress at the hands of his stepfather, also a novelist, his self-esteem is so shattered that he commits suicide.

== Cast ==
- Laura Betti as Arkadina
- Pamela Villoresi as Nina
- Remo Girone as Kostja
- Giulio Brogi as Trigorin
- Gisella Burinato
- Antonio Piovanelli
- Clara Colosimo
- Mattia Pinoli
- Remo Remotti

== See also ==
- List of Italian films of 1977
