= Mino (miniseries) =

- Mino and Pin
- Genre: Children, War
- Created by: Bernd Burgemeister
- Based on: The Little Alpino by Salvator Gotta
- Written by: Sandro Petraglia; Stefano Rulli; Piero Schivazappa
- Directed by: Gianfranco Albano
- Starring: Guido Cella; Mario Adorf; Pierre Cosso; Simona Cavallari; Michael Heltau; Ray Lovelock; Barbara May; Ottavia Piccolo
- Composer: Carlo Siliotto
- Countries of origin: Italy; Germany
- Original language: Italian
- No. of seasons: 1
- No. of episodes: Italy: 4 Germany: 6

Production
- Executive producers: Claudio Biondi; Roberto Levi
- Producers: Bernd Burgemeister; Fiammetta Lusignoli
- Production locations: Dolomites, Saint-Rhémy-en-Bosses, Bassano del Grappa, San Vito di Leguzzano
- Cinematography: Marcello Gatti
- Editor: Gino Bartolini
- Running time: 344 minutes
- Production company: Tangram Film

Original release
- Network: ZDF
- Release: 25 December 1986
- Network: RAI Uno
- Release: 28 December 1986

Mino was the eighth ZDF-Weihnachtsserie (English: Christmas Series), and aired in 1986. The series was broadcast in Germany on ZDF, and consisted of 6 episodes. Broadcasting in Germany began on 25 December 1986. The series was also broadcast in Italy, and consisted of 4 episodes. Broadcasting in Italy began on 28 December 1986. The series was an Italian-German co-production. It was inspired by the Italian novel The little Alpino by Salvator Gotta.

== Plot ==
=== Episodes 1 & 2 ===
1914: Giacomino "Mino" Rasi is the ten-year-old son of a Milan university mathematics professor. His family is friends with the aristocratic Austrian consul Karl Stolz and his much younger wife Freda. In August 1914 the Rasi family travels to Austria to visit the Stolz family. World War I has already broken out, but the spirit is upbeat and both families spend a happy time. That Italy, a member of the Triple Alliance, has remained neutral at the outbreak of the war causes a slight alteration between Karl and Minos father.

For the Christmas holidays Minos family goes skiing to the Great Saint Bernard Pass in the Aosta Valley. They spend Christmas at the Great Saint Bernard Hospice and the next day set out on ski to Courmayeur. But they are buried by a massive avalanche. Mino is found by Pin the Saint Bernard dog of the young Italian smuggler Rico, who takes Mino to his and his older brothers house. The next day they search for his parents but find only his mothers scarf.

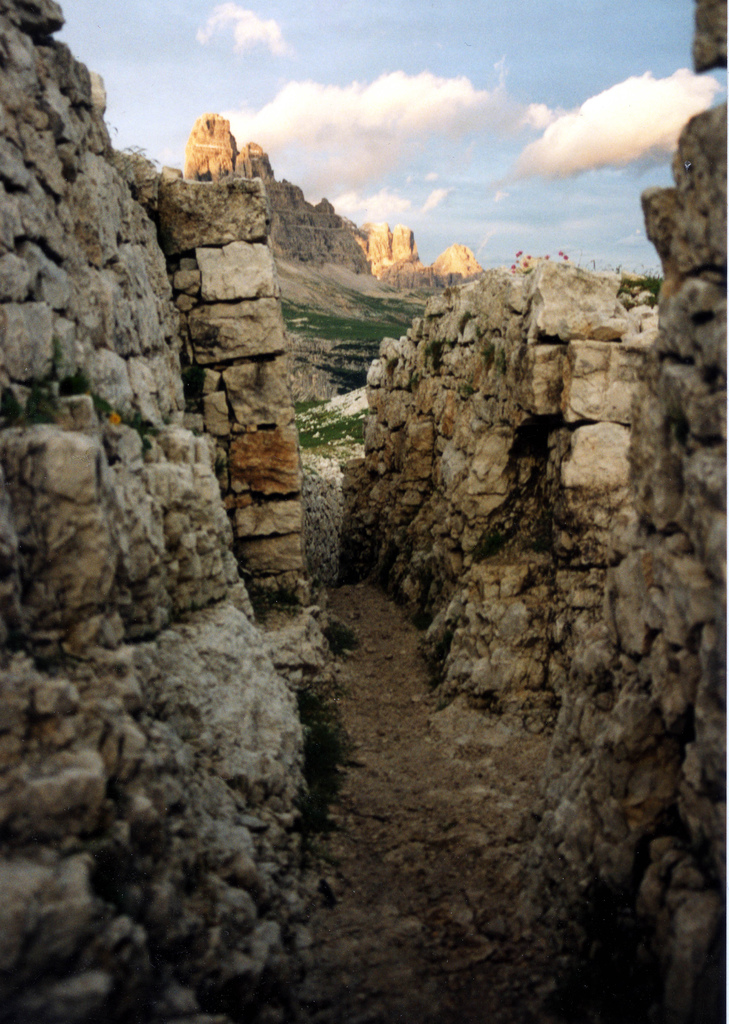
Italian positions on Monte Piana - one of the filming locations

1915: Assuming his parents are dead, Mino stays with Rico and his brother Bastiano. Unbeknown to Mino his parents have survived and in May his father returns to look amid the melting snow for his sons body. His search is unsuccessful and he returns to Milan. In the meantime Italy has declared war on Austria and Rico is called up to fight. Bastiano tries to convinces his brother to flee to Switzerland, but Rico chooses to go with all his friends for the "one-two months" of war.

Soon Mino decides to go to Argentina as his grandparents emigrated with his uncle to Cordoba. Ricos dog Pin follows Mino. Arriving in the city of Aosta they find Rico by chance. Rico is now an Alpino in the Aosta Alpini battalion. The battalions commanding officer Major Lupo sends Mino to the local orphanage. But Mino soon elopes to find Rico, who has departed with the battalion for the Isonzo front on the other side of Italy.

After some time on the road he arrives in a small town in the Friuli-Venezia Giulia region and meets a young girl Nena and her blind grandfather, who scrape by as street musicians. They take him in and Mino and Nena become quickly friends. At diner Mino talks about going to the front to find Rico. The old man tells Mino that war is brutal and no place for kids. He shows him his empty eye socks and tells a shaken Mino how he lost his eyes and all his friends in the Battle of Adwa. That night Mino and Nena discover an Austrian spy. The spy is captured, but Mino and Nena are shocked when they have to watch the spy and the spies wife being shot the next morning. Soon afterwards Mino and Pin leave to look for Rico once more.

He finally finds the Aosta battalion on the Dolomite front. Reluctantly Major Lupo allows Mino to stay with the battalion. The soldiers tailor a small uniform, including a Cappello Alpino, for Mino, who thus becomes a Little Alpino and the mascot of the battalion. In the meantime his father, who has become a captain in the 44° Artillery Regiment, once more returns to Aosta to look for his sons body and by chance learns from Bastiano that Mino lives and left some months earlier. Minos father sets out to find Rico, hoping that he may have information as to where Mino went. In the meantime the Aosta battalion has been ordered to conquer an Austrian mountain position. Mino stays behind, but as the battle noise moves away he and Pin go to the battlefield to look for him. In a poignant scene Mino walks up the eerily silent mountain, whose slopes are covered with hundreds of dead soldiers, to find Rico dying.

Major Lupo consoles Mino as good he can. As the battalion has been badly mauled it is taken out of the front. Soon afterwards Minos father comes to look for Rico, but only finds Ricos grave.

The Aosta has been moved to the Carso front. The battalion is sent to the front line trenches for yet another assault. Mino stays with the battalions priest Don Giuliano behind, who teaches him to pray not only for his Italian friends, but also for the Austrian soldiers, as the realm of god is a single nation. Soon Don Giuliano goes to the front as his place is with those, who need a priest now. As the artillery shelling gets more intense Mino begins to drink Grappa for courage. When the Italian base comes under artillery fire Mino runs to find Don Giuliano, but he gets lost in the fog and smoke and gravely injured by shrapnel becomes unconscious. When he awakes in the night he finds himself tangled in the barbed wire of no man's land. Around him he recognizes the corpses of many friends. Pin is let loose by Major Lupo and runs to Mino. Major Lupo orders to rise a white flag and alone moves towards Mino. Three Austrians soldiers come to aid him and together they manage to cut Mino out of the wire and bandage his wounds.

The next day the battalion buries its dead, calling out every dead soldiers name. Afterwards Mino is taken with the other wounded to a military hospital and leaves Pin with Giuseppe. As the cart with the wounded moves down the mountain, the battalion marches to conquer yet another mountain.

1916: Mino has spent the winter in the hospital. He has begun to teach the wounded soldiers to read and write. Major Lupo and Giuseppe come to visit him- Pin has run away, but the rest of the men are fine. When a round of soldiers is called up to go back to the front, the officer in charge, Captain Balestra, tells Mino that his father is alive, he knows him and he will take Mino to him.

=== Episodes 3 & 4 ===
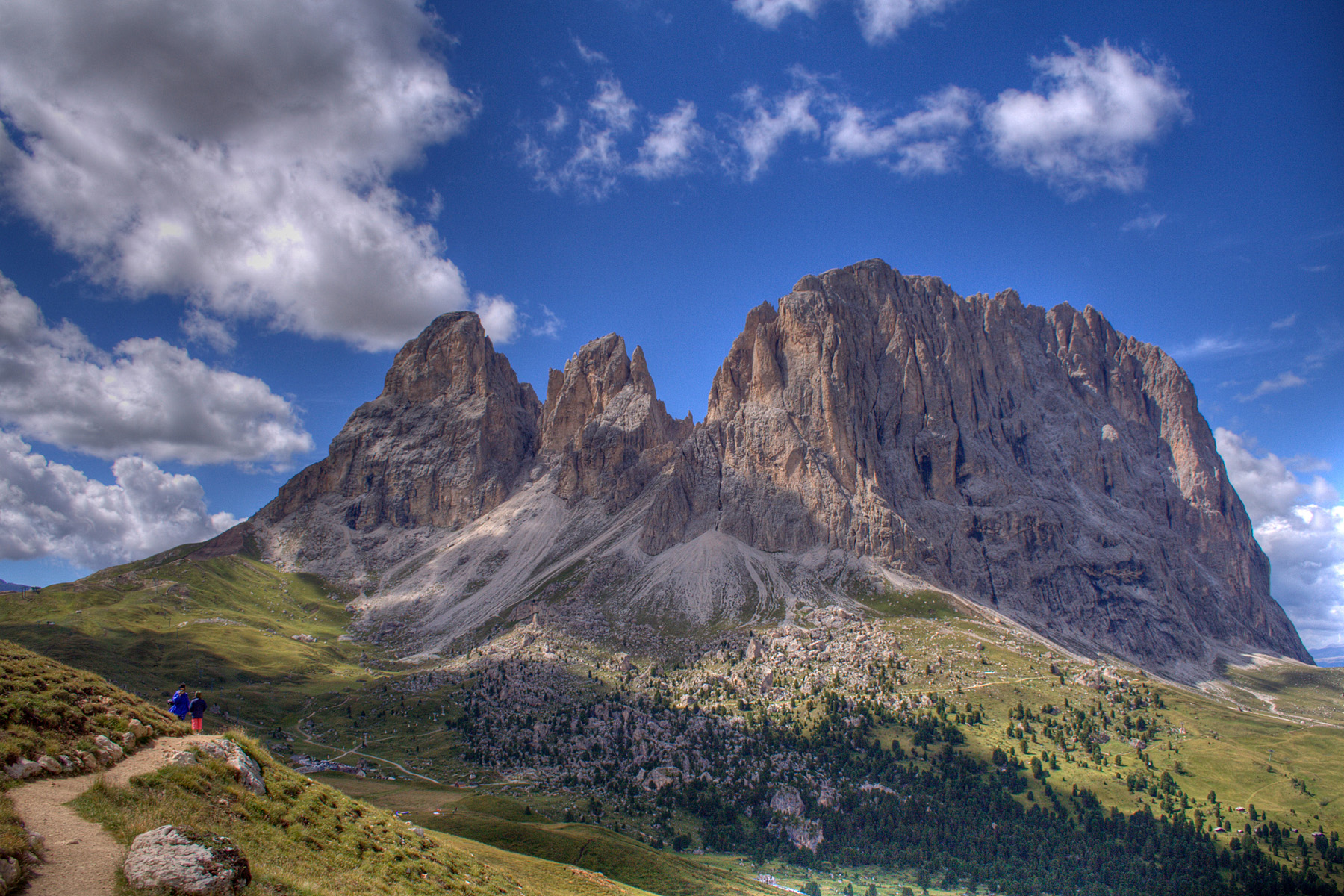
Langkofel a Dolomites Mountain

Soon Mino and Balestra leave for the front. Major Lupo comes to say goodbye and promises to visit Mino and his father once the war will be over. Balestra brings Mino to Micheles regiments headquarter on the Altopiano d'Asiago. As Minos father is on a nearby mountain top artillery observation post, the soldiers put Mino in the crate of an aerial tramway and send him up the mountain. Halfway up the mountain Mino crosses with the crate going down to the valley and within his father. They see each other and talk for a fraction of a minute before they are separated again.

Mino arrives at the summit station in the middle of the first artillery barrage of the Austrian summer offensive of 1916. Mino hurries to call his father on the observations posts telephone and learns that his mother is alive and in Treviso. The phone cable and the aerial tramway are destroyed by the intense shelling and Mino runs away to meet his father down in the valley. But he soon must hide in a crevice from the bombardment. When he comes out the Austrians have swept away the Italian positions and Mino finds only one gravely injured Italian survivor at the observation post. Mino alone carries and drags the wounded Lieutenant from the mountain plateau of Asiago to the valley below. After some days an Italian patrol finds them and brings them to a hospital.

Mino immediately sets out for Treviso to find his mother. When he arrives he discovers that she is kept in insane asylum. She has lost her mind, grieving for her dead son. She does not recognize Mino and has a mental breakdown, when he insists he is her son and alive.

Unable to bear this Mino soon returns to the front at Asiago to find his father. By luck he finds two soldiers, who bring him to the batman of his father. Mino learns that his fathers whereabouts are unknown. Michele stayed behind to blow up the guns and ammunition of the regiment, when the Austrian advance swept the Italian army off the Asiago mountain plateau. That night the batman takes Mino to the first trench, where he calls out to one of his friends fighting on the Austrian side. But the Austrian does not know if Minos father is dead or prisoner. Mino is convinced his father is alive and is determined to cross the front and go to Austria to find his father. That night Mino climbs through a gorge and successfully crosses the front. He is quickly apprehended by the Austrians. Mino claims to be the nephew of Karl Stolz, who by now is a Colonel in the Austro–Hungarian Armys general staff and an aide-de-camp to emperor Franz Joseph I.

The Stolz take Mino to their villa near Klagenfurt. Karl tells Mino of the death and funeral of emperor Franz Joseph I of Austria, but soon leaves for Vienna again and promises Mino that he will do his best to find his father. Mino spends the winter with Freda Stolz in Klagenfurt.

1917: Karl finally has found Michele and brings him to Mino in spring 1917. He also has arranged for a transfer of Michele to a nearby prisoner of war camp, as Michele refuses to receive special treatment. Karl returns to Vienna and Mino, his father and Freda spend a carefree summer and Minos father begins an affair with Freda. At the end of summer Karl returns. He and his wife discuss that the end of the Austro-Hungarian Empire is near. He also tells Mino that the Austrian army with help from the German Imperial Army will soon undertake a major offensive against the Italian front. Proudly he shows him the maps with the plan of the attack drawn up by the Bavarian general Konrad Krafft von Dellmensingen. Mino tells his father about the planned offensive, but his father is indifferent to the information and tells Mino that it is better to lose the war, than to let the war continue.

That night Mino runs away, hoping to bring the information in time to the Italians. He leaves a letter for his father asking for his forgiveness. Mino successfully crosses the front line, but it is already to late and the Italian Army is already in full flight. Mino is asked by an officer of the Italian Intelligence Service (Ufficio Informazioni) to stay behind and act as courier for an Italian spy ring. Mino agrees and is accommodated with a young woman Naide and her newborn child. During the day Mino works in an inn with Naide and in the night he sneaks into an abandoned villa to retrieve ciphered messages hidden in Schopenhauers The World as Will and Representation.

Mino soon befriends two Austrian officers Vavra and Delkin. Vavra is an intellectual, who often goes to the same villa as Mino to read the many books in the villas library. Mino has grown and begins to look at Naide with different the eyes. She senses it and soon they share his first kiss.

1918: The next summer has come and Vavra by accident reveals to Mino the date of the last Austrian offensive of the war. Vavra returns from the battle shaken and distraught as his friend Delkin has died and because it is obvious the Italians were aware of the Austrian attack preparations, as the Italian artillery opened fire 30 minutes before the opening of the offensive all along the front inflicted heavy casualties on the crowded Austrians in the front line trenches. That night a suspicious Vavra follows Mino and discovers the Italian spies. The spies tell Mino that an Italian airplane will pick them up in 20 days near Tolmezzo and that if Mino manages to bring his father there, they will take them along. Vavra reports this to the Austrian military authorities, but without mentioning Minos name.

Mino decides to take the train to Klagenfurt and in the train station meets Nena again. Her grandfather has died. Together they travel to Klagenfurt. In the meantime Karl Stolz has returned from Vienna to his wife. He informs her that the Austrian empire is nearing its end and that she must go to Vienna as Klagenfurt might not be safe when the Austrian Army will collapse. He visits Minos father to express his desperation at the nearing end of the multi-ethnic Austrian Empire. Dressed in his parade uniform he leaves for the front on Monte Grappa as he does not want to survive the Empire.

Mino and Nena arrive to find Freda leaving for Vienna. Mino quickly finds his father, as the Austrian guards already have deserted the prisoner of war camp. Together they cross the Julian Alps and make their way to Tolmezzo. They meet up with the two Italian spies. Minos father is unable to speak to his son, as he is too ashamed for having betrayed Mino, his wife and his fatherland. When the biplane lands a group of Austrian soldiers appear and a firefight ensues. Mino's father chooses to stay behind to fight off the Austrians and is killed as the airplane takes off.

A delirious Mino is brought to a field hospital and Nena watches over him. Soon the hospital is swamped with wounded and dead as the last Italian offensive of the war is underway. Mino and Nena stay at the hospital to help. One day Mino finds a gravely wounded Major Lupo between the many wounded. He has been injured while fighting with the 4 Alpini Regiment in the Battle of Monte Grappa. His right arm is amputated and when he regains consciousness he tells Mino about the last Austrian attacks on Monte Grappa: the Austrians led by a colonel in parade uniform attacked without ammunition and perished all. Mino understands thus that also Karl Stolz is dead.

Giuseppe comes to visit Mino and Lupo at the hospital. He brings Pin with him, who after having run away from the battalion, had crisscrossed the entire front looking for Mino and as he couldn't find him he returned to the Aosta battalion. As Mino has lost his Cappello Alpino Giuseppe leaves his Cappello to Mino. A deteriorating Lupo is transferred to another hospital and leaves his possessions with Mino. including a bag with hundreds of name tags of the battalion's fallen soldiers. As he reads the names of the hundreds of tags, he realizes that only Giuseppe is left of the battalions soldiers he knew. Just at this time the news of the Armistice of villa Giusti spreads through the hospital and all present celebrate the end of the war, save for Mino who sits with the name tags alone in a tent.

The war is over and Mino is decorated by General Diaz with a Gold Medal of Military Valor for his and his fathers service. He tells the general, that neither him nor his father did the war do any good.

Mino returns to Milan with Pin. Nena chooses to stay behind. In Milan he sells all the family's property to move with his mother to Cordoba in Argentina. It remains unclear if his mother has overcome her mental breakdown and does recognize him. The last scene of the movie is Mino and his mother dancing through their empty Milan flat to the tunes of an Austrian waltz.

== Cast ==
Character	Actor	Episode
Giacomino "Mino" Rasi	Guido Cella	All
Michele Rasi	Ray Lovelock	All
Enrica Rasi	Ottavia Piccolo	1, 3, 4
Major Lupo	Mario Adorf	All
Freda Stolz	Barbara May	1, 3, 4
Carlo Stolz	Michael Heltau	1, 3, 4
Rico	Piere Cosso	1, 2
Nena	Simona Cavallari	2, 4
Naide	Susanna Fassetta	4
Don Giuliano	Carlos Velat	2
Yaroslav Vavra	Dieter Schidor	4
Bastiano	Luigi Mezzanotte	1, 2
Giuseppe	Delio Chittò	2, 3, 4
General Diaz	Edmondo Tieghi	4

== Production ==
The series was filmed at the original locations in Northern Italy. The production got wide-ranging support from the Alpini of the Italian Armys 4th Alpine Army Corps.

== Media ==
- Mino, 2 DVDs, Kinowelt Home Entertainment 2007
