= Isabella Ragonese =

Italian actress

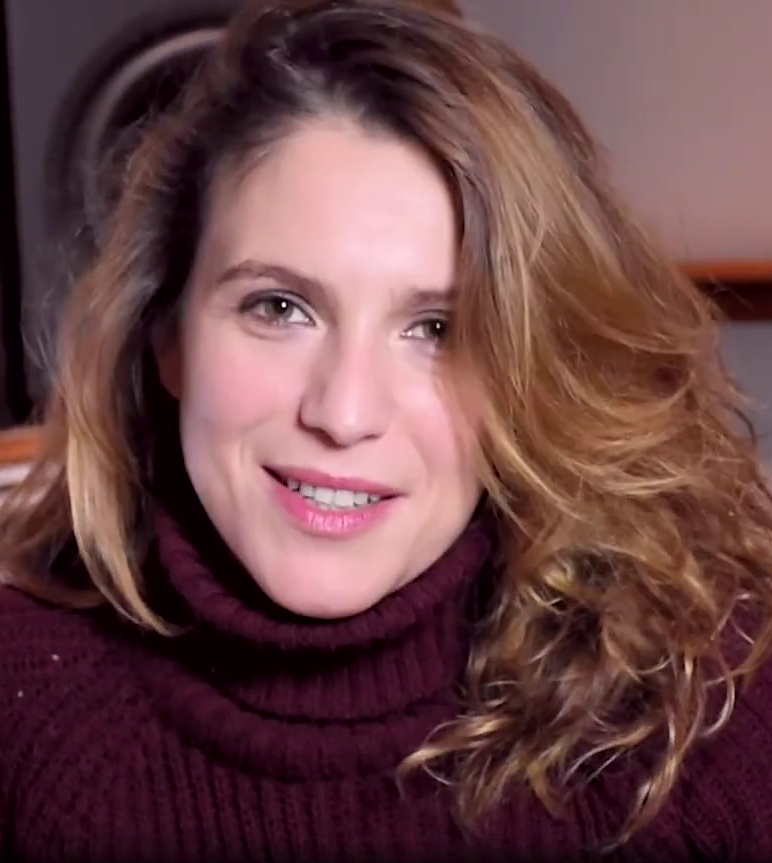
- Ragonese in 2017
- Born: 19 May 1981 (age 44)

Isabella Ragonese (born 19 May 1981) is an Italian actress.

She studied acting at the Teatès School in Palermo, under director Michele Perriera. During her studies, she wrote, directed and starred in several adaptations of his plays. In 1998 she won the first prize at INDA (National Institute for Ancient Drama), with a short essay on the figure of Hecuba. She graduated in 2000 with a diploma in acting.

She starred in her first film Nuovomondo in 2006, directed by Emanuele Crialese.

She is engaged to Samuel Umberto Romano, lead singer of the group Subsonica.

== Filmography ==
=== Films ===
Year	Title	Role	Notes
2006	Golden Door	Rosa	
2008	Your Whole Life Ahead of You	Marta	
2008	Il cosmo sul comò	Animals shop worker	Cameo appearance
2009	Purple Sea	Sara	
2009	Due vite per caso	Sonia	
2009	Ten Winters	Camilla	
2009	Oggi sposi	Chiara Malagò	
2010	The First Assignment	Nena	
2010	Un altro mondo	Livia	
2011	One Day More	Michela Bianchi	
2013	The Chair of Happiness	Bruna	
2014	Leopardi	Paolina Leopardi	
2014	So Far So Good	Marta	
2015	Another South	Stefania	
2015	Somewhere Amazing	Lucia	
2015	Let's Talk	Linda	
2016	Sun, Heart, Love	Eli	
2017	There Is a Light	Mia	
2017	It's All About Karma	Ginevra	
2019	My Brother Chases Dinosaurs	Katia	
2021	We Still Talk	Young Rina	
2021	Il giorno e la notte	Rita	
2021	Yara	Letizia Ruggeri	
2023	Like Sheep Among Wolves	Vera	

=== Television ===
Year	Title	Role	Notes
2011	Inspector Montalbano	Laura Belladonna	Episode: "L'eta del dubbio"
2016–2021	Rocco Schiavone	Marina	Main role (season 1-4)
2020	La guerra è finita	Giulia	Miniseries
2022	Solo per passione - Letizia Battaglia fotografa	Letizia Battaglia	Miniseries

== Awards ==
- Nastro d'Argento for Best supporting Actress 2010: La nostra vita & Due vite per caso (ex-aequo).
- Shooting Stars Award 2012: Ragonese received this award at the 62nd Berlin International Film Festival in February 2012, an annual acting award for up-and-coming actors by European Film Promotion.
