= Alessio Boni =

Italian actor (born 1966)

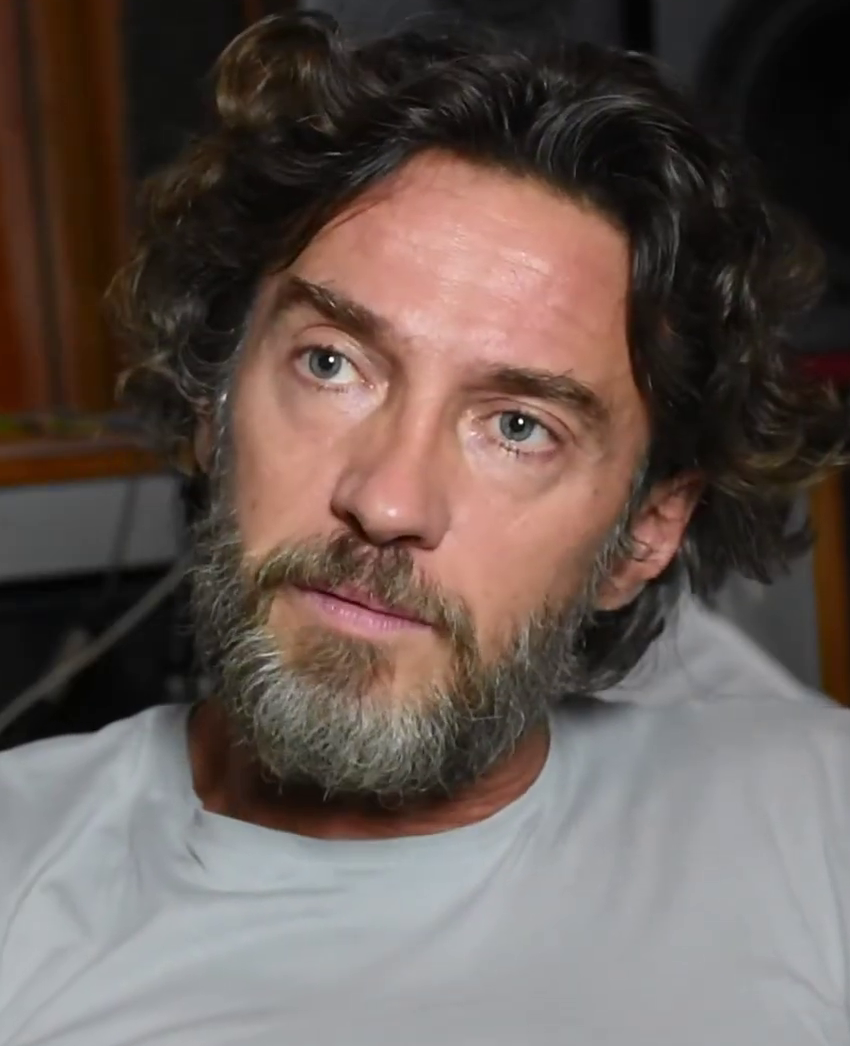
- Boni in 2017
- Born: 4 July 1966 (age 59); Sarnico, Italy
- Occupation: Actor
- Website: http://www.alessioboni.it/

Alessio Boni (born 4 July 1966) is an Italian actor.

== Life ==
Boni was born in Sarnico in 1966. He studied theatre at the Accademia Nazionale d'Arte Drammatica. The second of three children, Marco is the eldest and Andrea is the youngest brother. In 1998, he had his television breakthrough in La Donna del Treno.

Other roles:

- Quincy Moritz in Dracula (2002)
- Matteo Carati in The Best of Youth (La meglio gioventù) (2003)
- The Beast in the Heart (La bestia nel cuore / Don't Tell) (2005)
- Once You're Born You Can No Longer Hide (2005)
- The Goodbye Kiss (2006)
- Andrey Nikolayevich Bolkonsky in War and Peace (2007 – RAI-television series)
- Caravaggio in Caravaggio (2007 – RAI-television series)
- Giacomo Puccini in Puccini (2008 – RAI-television series)
- Sgt. Cerato in The Tourist (2010)
- Somewhere Amazing (2015)
- The Girl in the Fog (2017)
- Fra Dolcino in The Name of the Rose (2019)

== Filmography ==
=== Films ===
Year	Title	Role	Notes
1993	Where Are You? I'm Here	DJ	Cameo appearance
1996	Arrivano gli italiani	Roberto	
1999	Senza paura	Marco Morelli	
2003	The Best of Youth	Matteo Carati	
2005	Once You're Born You Can No Longer Hide	Bruno	
2005	Don't Tell	Franco	
2006	The Goodbye Kiss	Giorgio Pellegrini	
2006	Secret Journey	Leo Ferri	
2008	Wild Blood	Golfiero / Taylor	
2009	Cómplices del silencio	Maurizio Gallo	
2009	Christine Cristina	Gerson	
2010	The Tourist	Sergeant Cerato	
2014	Maldamore	Paolo	
2015	Somewhere Amazing	Andrea	
2017	The Girl in the Fog	Loris Martini	
2017	Agadah	Pietro	
2018	Tutte le mie notti	Federico Vincenti	
2019	I'm Not a Killer	Giovanni	
2020	Calibro 9	Inspector Valerio Di Leo	
2021	Yara	Colonel Vitale	
2023	Terenzín	Jacob Belstein	

=== Television ===
Year	Title	Role	Notes
1994	Inspector Sarti	Walter	Episode: "Brindisi di compleanno"
1995	Il mago	Michele	Television movie
1996	Il conte di Monte Cristo	Efisio	Television movie
1997–1999	Un prete tra noi	Gianni	Main role (season 1), guest (season 2)
1998	La donna del treno	Mino Tonelli	Television movie
1999	Pepe Carvalho	Mauro Dejana	Episode: "Alla ricerca di Sheherazade"
2000–2001	Incantesimo	Dr. Marco Oberon	Main role (season 3-4)
2002	L'altra donna	Simone Marini	Television movie
2002	Dracula	Quincy	Television movie
2003	L'uomo del vento	Massimo Adorni	Television movie
2004	Vite a perdere	Pino	Television movie
2004	Cime tempestose	Heathcliff	Television movie
2005	La caccia	Lorenzo Freddi	Main role
2007	War and Peace	Andrei Nikolayevich Bolkonsky	Lead role
2008	Caravaggio	Caravaggio	Television movie
2008	Rebecca, la mia prima moglie	Maxim de Winter	Television movie
2009	Puccini	Giacomo Puccini	Docuseries
2010	Tutti pazzi per amore	Adriano Ventoni	Main role (season 2)
2011	I cerchi nell'acqua	Davide Freccero	Main role
2012	Mai per amore	Stefano	Episode: "La fuga di Teresa"
2012	Walter Chiari - Fino all'ultima risata	Walter Chiari	Television movie
2013	Odysseus	Odysseus	Lead role
2014	Gli anni spezzati	Giorgio Venuti	Episode: "L'ingegnere"
2017–2019	Back Home	Fausto Morra	Lead role
2019	Enrico Piaggio: Un sogno italiano	Enrico Piaggio	Television movie
2019	Adrian Live - Questa è la storia	Narrator (voice)	Adrian pre-show specials
2019	The Name of the Rose	Fra Dolcino	Main role
2019	Giorgio Ambrosoli: Il prezzo del coraggio	Giorgio Ambrosoli	Docuseries
2019–2021	La compagnia del Cigno	Luca Marioni	Lead role
2022	Rinascere	Franco Bortuzzo	Television movie
2023	Il metodo Fenoglio - L'estate fredda	Pietro Fenoglio	Lead role
