= Once You're Born You Can No Longer Hide =

2005 Italian drama film

- Italian film poster
- Directed by: Marco Tullio Giordana
- Screenplay by: Marco Tullio Giordana; Sandro Petraglia; Stefano Rulli
- Based on: Quando sei nato non puoi più nasconderti by Maria Pace Ottieri
- Starring: Alessio Boni
- Cinematography: Roberto Forza
- Edited by: Roberto Missiroli
- Music by: Lula Sarchioni
- Distributed by: 01 Distribution (Italy); Mars Distribution (France)
- Release date: 13 May 2005
- Running time: 115 minutes
- Countries: Italy; France; United Kingdom
- Language: Italian
- Box office: $1 780 221

Once You're Born You Can No Longer Hide (Italian: Quando sei nato non puoi più nasconderti) is a 2005 Italian drama film directed by Marco Tullio Giordana. The film concerns undocumented migration to Italy via the Mediterranean Sea.

== Plot ==
A young Italian boy accidentally falls overboard while yachting with his father on the Mediterranean. He is rescued by a boatload of undocumented immigrants attempting to reach Italy by sailing across the Mediterranean. On the ship, he is befriended by a young Romanian man and his sister. The film follows the relationship of the Italian boy with the Romanian once they reach the Italian shores.

== Cast ==
- Alessio Boni – Bruno
- Michela Cescon – Lucia
- Rodolfo Corsato – Popi
- Matteo Gadola – Sandro
- Ester Hazan – Alina
- Vlad Alexandru Toma – Radu
- Marcello Prayer – Tore
- Giovanni Martorana – Barracano
- Simona Solder – Maura
- Andrea Tidona – Padre Celso
- Adriana Asti

== Awards ==
- Prix François Chalais, 2005 Cannes Film Festival
- Nastro d'Argento Best Producers

== See also ==
- Movies about immigration to Italy
