= Sahara Cross =

- Directed by: Tonino Valerii
- Screenplay by: Ernesto Gastaldi; Adriano Belli; Tonino Valerii
- Story by: Adriano Belli
- Produced by: Donatella Senatore; Giorgio Cardelli
- Starring: Franco Nero; Michel Constantin; Pamela Villoresi
- Cinematography: Franco Di Giacomo
- Edited by: Mario Siciliano
- Music by: Riz Ortolani
- Production company: Cine Vera s.p.a.
- Distributed by: Variety Distribution
- Release date: 7 September 1977 (Italy)
- Running time: 105 minutes
- Country: Italy
- Box office: ₤706.96 million

Sahara Cross is a 1977 Italian action film directed by Tonino Valerii. It is the first Italian film to use steadicam.

== Cast ==
- Franco Nero as Jean Bellard
- Michel Constantin as Carl Mank
- Pamela Villoresi as Nicole
- Mauro Barabani as Hamid
- Antonio Cantafora as Georges (as Michael Coby)
- Nazzareno Zamperla as Captain Zaft
- Geoffrey Copleston as Colonel Brown
- Pietro Valsecchi as Arab terrorist

== Production ==
The film was originally very different than the completed film. Valerii stated that the film was originally titled Arissa Ballerina and written by Adriano Belli. Valerii commented that "In short, everything was the opposite of what Hitchcock recommended, that is, that characters must ignore what the viewer knows. I told the producers I would make a film out of that script, because it just made no sense!" Gastaldi and Valerii re-wrote the script, but struggled as the Tunisian co-production signed on to Belli's script. Gastaldi's contribution added new motivations for characters and included a few new scenes such as the battle between two bulldozers. Valerii wasn't initially happy with casting Pamela Villoresi, stating that "Sometimes you have to make do with compromises or economical limitations, Villoresi is a very good actress, but I wouldn't cast her as a terrorist, if it weren't for a pre-signed agreement."

The film was shot in nine weeks. It was shot at Cinecitta with exteriors shot in Tunisia. Valerii used a steadicam for the desert shots. As it was a very first model, director of photography Franco Di Giacomo and cameraman Gianfranco Transunto were sent for special training in Vienna to use it.

== Release ==
Sahara Cross was released in Italy on 7 September 1977 where it was distributed by F.A.R. The film grossed a total of 706,960,000 Italian lira on its theatrical run.

== Footnotes ==
=== References ===
- Curti, Roberto (2013). Italian Crime Filmography, 1968-1980. McFarland. ISBN 978-0786469765.
