= Pummarò =

1990 film

- Directed by: Michele Placido
- Written by: Michele Placido; Sandro Petraglia; Stefano Rulli
- Produced by: Claudio Bonivento; Pietro Valsecchi
- Starring: Thywill Abraham
- Cinematography: Vilko Filač
- Edited by: Ruggero Mastroianni
- Music by: Lucio Dalla; Mauro Malavasi
- Release date: 1990
- Running time: 102 minutes
- Country: Italy
- Language: Italian

Pummarò is a 1990 Italian drama film directed by Michele Placido. It was screened in the Un Certain Regard section at the 1990 Cannes Film Festival.

== Cast ==
- Thywill Abraham
- Kwaku Amenya
- Salvatore Billa
- Ottaviano Dell'Acqua
- Nicola Di Pinto
- Franco Interlenghi
- Gerardo Scala
- Pamela Villoresi
- Hermann Weisskopf
- Jacqueline Williams

== See also ==
- Films about immigration to Italy
