= Somewhere Amazing =

- Directed by: Giorgia Cecere
- Written by: Giorgia Cecere; Pierpaolo Pirone
- Produced by: Donatella Botti
- Starring: Isabella Ragonese; Alessio Boni
- Cinematography: Claudio Cofrancesco
- Music by: Donatello Pisanello
- Release date: August 27, 2015
- Language: Italian

Somewhere Amazing (Italian: In un posto bellissimo) is a 2015 Italian drama film written and directed by Giorgia Cecere and starring Isabella Ragonese and Alessio Boni.

== Plot ==
Lucia works in her own florist shop in the center of Asti. Her husband Andrea is a business executive and Tommaso, their teenage son, reminds her of herself when she was young. A foreign boy Feysal who sells various objects on the street starts to cast a light on things that Lucia never wanted to pay attention to - for example about Andrea. Slowly she starts to realise that her life is not as perfect as she thought it was.

== Cast ==
- Isabella Ragonese as Lucia
- Alessio Boni as Andrea
- Piera Degli Esposti as Adriana
- Paolo Sassanelli as Angelo
- Tatiana Lepore as Carla
- Michele Griffo as Tommaso
- Faysal Abbaoui as Feysal
- Teresa Acerbis as Lucia's Mother

== See also ==
- List of Italian films of 2015
