= Andrea Tidona =

Italian actor and voice actor

- Born: 30 November 1951 (age 73); Modica, Sicily, Italy
- Occupation: Actor
- Height: 1.78 m (5 ft 10 in)

Andrea Tidona (born 30 November 1951) is an Italian actor and voice actor.

== Life and career ==
Born in Modica, Sicily, Tidona formed at the Accademia dei Filodrammatici and later worked several years at the Piccolo Teatro in Milan, under Giorgio Strehler. In 2004, he won the Nastro d'Argento for best actor for his performance in Marco Tullio Giordana's The Best of Youth. He is well known for the role of Carmine Fazio in The Young Montalbano.

== Selected filmography ==
- Life Is Beautiful (1997)
- One Hundred Steps (2000)
- Il commissario (2001)
- The Best of Youth (2001)
- Once You're Born You Can No Longer Hide (2005)
- The Caiman (2006)
- The Listening (2006)
- Butta la luna (2006)
- Il 7 e l'8 (2007)
- Il Capo dei Capi (2007)
- Pius XII: Under the Roman Sky (2010)
- The Entrepreneur (2011)
- The Young Montalbano (2012)
- The Face of an Angel (2014)
- Italo (2014)
