= Pamela Villoresi =

Italian actress (born 1957)

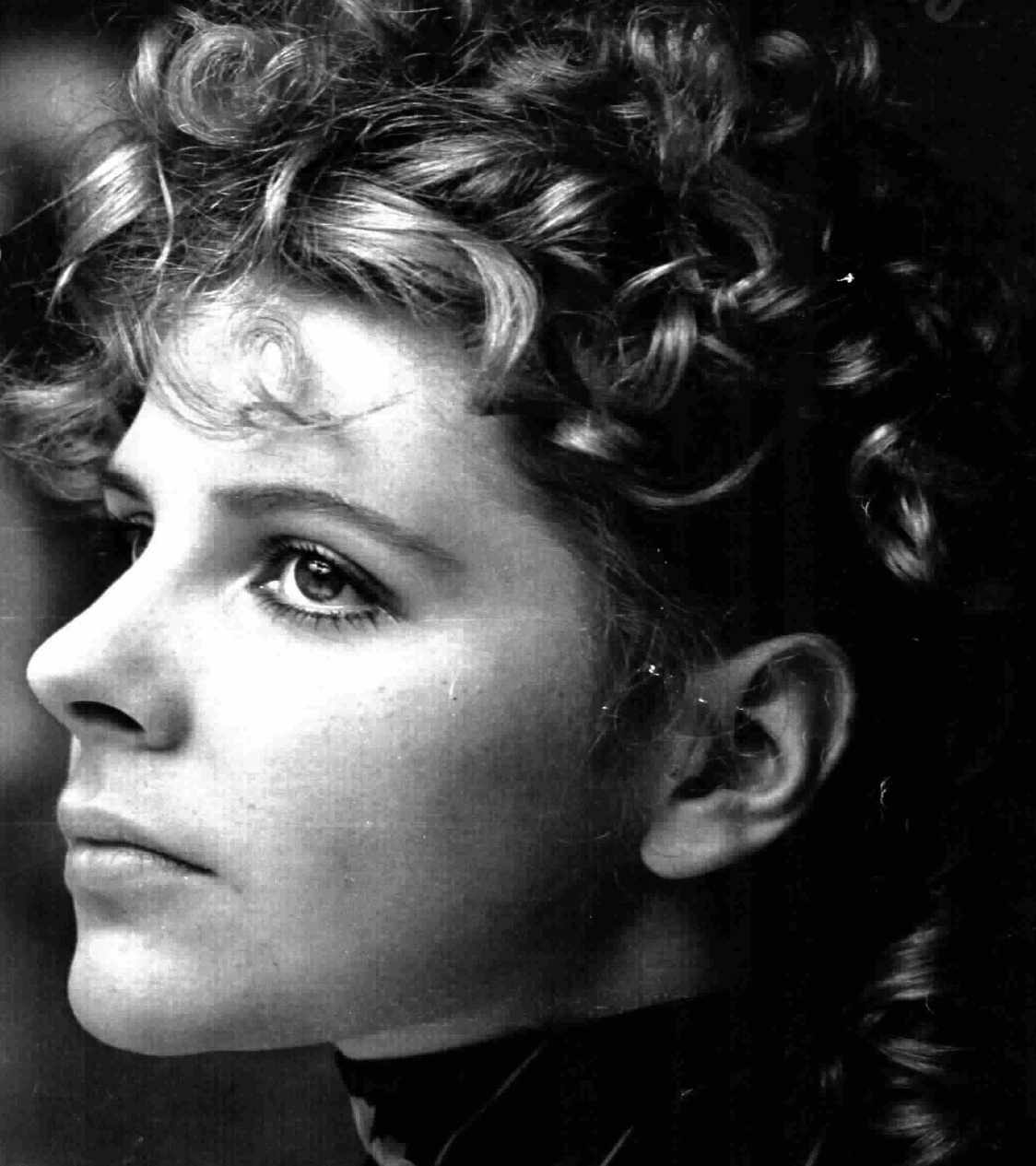
- Pamela Villoresi in Radiocorriere magazine, 1975
- Born: Maria Pamela Villoresi; 1 January 1957 (age 69); Prato
- Occupation: Actress
- Years active: 1970s–present
- Spouse: Cristiano Pogany (m. 1979; died 1999)

Maria Pamela Villoresi (born 1 January 1957) is an Italian theatre, cinema and television actress. She has performed in more than 100 theatrical productions and in more than 30 films.

== Life and career ==
The daughter of a cloth merchant of Prato and of a German mother, Pamela Villoresi began her artistic career following the acting lessons at the Teatro Metastasio in Prato. In 1975 Giorgio Strehler called her to be part of the theater company he started, Piccolo Teatro di Milano. Simultaneously she achieved great success with the television drama Marco Visconti and started a continuous career in cinema, in which she frequently had leading roles.

In 1975 she posed nude as cover girl for Playmen. In 1978 she won a Grolla d'oro for her role in Marco Bellocchio's Il gabbiano. From 1990 she occasionally was a stage director and a TV presenter.

In 2010 she ran in the Lazio regional election, supporting the center-right candidate Renata Polverini. She was not elected. She considers herself Catholic, although her actual stance is more similar to pantheism.

== Selected filmography ==
- Il trafficone (1974)
- Marco Visconti (1975, TV series)
- Private Vices, Public Pleasures (1976)
- Take All of Me (1976)
- Tell Me You Do Everything for Me (1976)
- Il gabbiano (1977)
- Sahara Cross (1978)
- Ligabue (1978)
- A Dangerous Toy (1979)
- Target (1979)
- Splendor (1989)
- The Sun Also Shines at Night (1990)
- A Violent Life (1990)
- Pummarò (1990)
- The Bankers of God: The Calvi Affair (2002)
- Amici miei – Come tutto ebbe inizio (2011)
- The Great Beauty (2013)
- I Killed Napoléon (2015)
- Ears (2016)
- Youtopia (2018)
