= La scuola =

- Directed by: Daniele Luchetti
- Written by: Domenico Starnone; Daniele Luchetti; Sandro Petraglia
- Produced by: Mario Cecchi Gori; Vittorio Cecchi Gori
- Starring: Silvio Orlando; Fabrizio Bentivoglio; Anna Galiena
- Cinematography: Alessio Gelsini Torresi
- Edited by: Mirco Garrone
- Music by: Bill Frisell
- Distributed by: Cecchi Gori Group
- Release date: 6 April 1995
- Running time: 104 minutes
- Country: Italy
- Language: Italian
- Box office: $5.5 million (Italy)

La scuola (also known as School) is a 1995 Italian comedy-drama film directed by Daniele Luchetti. It is loosely based on two books by Domenico Starnone, Ex Cattedra and Sottobanco.

The film was awarded with the David di Donatello for Best Film.

== Plot ==
It is the last day of school in a run-down technical institute in the Roman suburbs before the summer break. Mr. Vivaldi, an Italian literature teacher, bitterly remembers what happened during the school year and wonders what will happen to those young students that he cared for as children from their first day of school: they've paid him off in a somewhat offensive way, given that, as the teacher has noted, today's youth have changed, they are drifters and without a sense of civic duty.

== Cast ==
- Silvio Orlando as Mr. Vivaldi, Italian literature and History teacher
- Anna Galiena as Mrs. Majello, Maths teacher
- Fabrizio Bentivoglio as Mr. Sperone, deputy headmaster
- Antonio Petrocelli as Mr. Cirrotta, Physical Education teacher
- Anita Zagaria as Mrs. Gana, teacher
- Roberto Nobile as Mr. Mortillaro, French literature teacher
- Enrica Maria Modugno as Mrs. Lugo, English literature teacher
- Gea Martire as Mrs. Ostia, teacher

== Reception ==
The film was the third most popular Italian film in Italy for the year with a gross of 8.7 billion lire ($5.5 million) and was number one at the Italian box office for three consecutive weeks.
