= The Invisible Wall (1991 film) =

The Rubber Wall
- Theatrical release poster by Renato Casaro
- Directed by: Marco Risi
- Written by: Andrea Purgatori; Sandro Petraglia; Stefano Rulli
- Produced by: Mario Cecchi Gori; Vittorio Cecchi Gori; Maurizio Tedesco
- Starring: Corso Salani
- Cinematography: Mauro Marchetti
- Edited by: Claudio Di Mauro
- Music by: Francesco De Gregori
- Distributed by: Penta Distribuzione
- Release date: 12 September 1991 (Italy)
- Running time: 120 minutes
- Country: Italy
- Language: Italian

The Invisible Wall (Italian: Il muro di gomma, lit. 'The Rubber Wall') is a 1991 Italian drama film directed by Marco Risi. The film, which deals with the crash of Itavia Flight 870, entered the competition at the 48th Venice International Film Festival.

== Plot ==
Italy, on the evening of June 27, 1980, a civil aircraft flown by the Italian domestic airline Itavia, travelling from Bologna to Palermo, disappears in flight. Its remains are near Ustica: eighty victims. The causes are mysterious.

== Cast ==
- Corso Salani: Rocco Ferrante
- Angela Finocchiaro: Giannina
- Ivano Marescotti: Giulio
- Antonello Fassari: Franco
- Carla Benedetti: Sandra
- Pietro Ghislandi: Corrà
- David Zard: Agente Segreto
- Mario Patané: Paolo
- Eliana Miglio: Anna
- Gianfranco Barra: Minister of Defence
- Ivo Garrani: Admiral Chief of the Defence Staff
- Sergio Fiorentini: General Chief of Staff of the Air Force
- Luigi Montini: General Air Force Spokesman
- Tony Sperandeo: Air Force NCO
- David Brandon : American Diplomat

== See also ==
- List of Italian films of 1991
