= The Truce (1997 film) =

La Tregua
- US theatrical release Poster
- Directed by: Francesco Rosi
- Screenplay by: Stefano Rulli; Sandro Petraglia; Francesco Rosi
- Story by: Francesco Rosi; Tonino Guerra
- Based on: The Truce by Primo Levi
- Produced by: Véra Belmont
- Starring: John Turturro; Rade Serbedzija
- Cinematography: Pasqualino De Santis; Marco Pontecorvo
- Edited by: Ruggero Mastroianni; Bruno Sarandrea
- Music by: Luis Bacalov
- Distributed by: Warner Bros. Italia
- Release date: February 14, 1997
- Running time: 125 minutes
- Country: Italy
- Languages: Italian; Russian; English; Latin
- Box office: $1.4 million (Italy/USA)

The Truce (Italian: La Tregua) is a 1997 film directed by Francesco Rosi, who co-wrote the screenplay with Stefano Rulli and Sandro Petraglia, and its story treatment with Tonino Guerra based on Primo Levi's memoir, The Truce. The film deals with Primo Levi's experiences returning to Italy in 1945 after the Red Army liberated the concentration camp at Auschwitz during the Second World War. This was Rosi's final film before his death in 2015.

== Plot ==
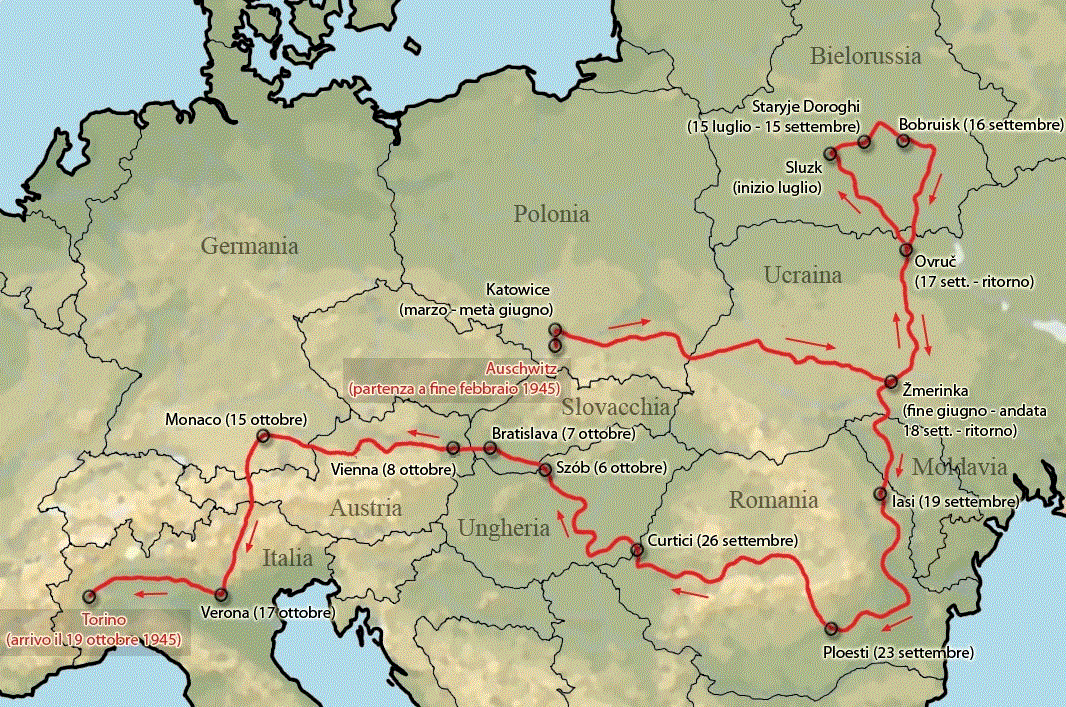
Map of the locations (with modern borders) traversed by Levi in the film.

Although liberated on January 27, 1945, Levi did not reach Turin until October 19 of that year. After spending some time in a Soviet camp for former concentration camp inmates, he embarked on an arduous journey home in the company of Italian former prisoners of war from the Italian Army in Russia. His long railway journey home to Turin took him on a circuitous route from Poland, through Russia, Romania, Hungary, Austria and Germany.

== Cast ==
- John Turturro as Primo Levi
- Rade Šerbedžija as The Greek (Morda Naum)
- Massimo Ghini as Cesare
- Stefano Dionisi as Daniele
- Teco Celio as Colonel Rovi
- Roberto Citran as Unverdorben
- Claudio Bisio as Ferrari
- Andy Luotto as D'Agata
- Agnieszka Wagner as Galina
- Lorenza Indovina as Flora
- Marina Gerasimenko as Maria Fyodorovna
- Igor Bezgin as Yegorov
- Aleksandr Aleksandrovich Ilyin|Aleksandr Ilyin as The Mongol
- Vyacheslav Olkhovskiy as Lieutenant Sergei
- Anatoli Vasilyev as Dr. Gotlieb

== Reception ==
On the review aggregator website Rotten Tomatoes, 53% of 15 critics' reviews are positive, with an average rating of 6.1/10.

Whereas the film can be seen as belonging to the tradition of the "cinema of prose," it also contributes to the "cinema of poetry," as defined by Pier Paolo Pasolini.

Brian Webster, writing for the Apollo Guide, finds the film "a war story with little violence and virtually no sentimentality. If you're not ready for it, you might find The Truce passing before your eyes without making much of an impact. It doesn't smack you in the face with a powerful message, but instead works its way inside you more gradually."

The film opened on 71 screens in Italy and grossed $414,890 in its opening weekend, ranking sixth at the box office. After three weeks it had grossed $1.4 million. In the US and Canada it grossed $71,448.

== Awards ==
This film won the David for Best Director, Best Film and Best Producer at the David di Donatello Awards. It also won the Audience Award at the São Paulo International Film Festival.

It was nominated for the Palme d'Or at the 1997 Cannes Film Festival.
