= My Brother Is an Only Child =

- Theatrical release poster
- Directed by: Daniele Luchetti
- Written by: Daniele Luchetti; Sandro Petraglia; Stefano Rulli
- Produced by: Riccardo Tozzi; Giovanni Stabilini; Marco Chimenz
- Starring: Elio Germano; Riccardo Scamarcio; Angela Finocchiaro; Luca Zingaretti
- Cinematography: Claudio Collepiccolo
- Edited by: Mirco Garrone
- Music by: Franco Piersanti
- Production companies: Cattleya; Babe Films
- Distributed by: Warner Bros. Pictures
- Release date: 20 April 2007
- Running time: 100 minutes
- Country: Italy
- Language: Italian
- Box office: $12 million

My Brother Is an Only Child (Italian: Mio fratello è figlio unico) is a 2007 Italian drama film directed by Daniele Luchetti. It is based on an Antonio Pennacchi novel. The title comes from a song by Rino Gaetano from 1976.

== Plot ==
Accio (Elio Germano) and Manrico (Riccardo Scamarcio) are working class brothers who live in Italy in the 1960s. While his brother becomes drawn into left-wing politics, Accio, the hotheaded younger brother, is taken under the wing of a market trader and while under his influence, joins the Fascist party. Accio ("Bully") is a nickname he is proud of because it makes him seem tough. Manrico and their sister Violetta are alarmed to hear their brother listening to Benito Mussolini's speeches in his room. Manrico often physically torments his brother, including stuffing his head in the barrel under the drain pipe of their house.

Accio once runs away from home because his mother voted for the Houses Party. Their house is falling apart and she thinks the Houses Party will help them rebuild it.

As Accio and Manrico get older they start demonstrating as members of the Fascist party and the Communist movement respectively. (There are scenes of a factory occupation, and the occupation of the Rome conservatoire, where the sister is studying the cello.) The film is relatively even handed in its treatment of politics. If the young fascists seem absurd with their chanting of 'Duce! Duce!', and their actions constantly tending to violence, the communists are hardly less so: Schiller's words in the final movement of Beethoven's choral symphony are replaced by a hymn in praise of Mao Zedong, Vladimir Lenin and Joseph Stalin; a meeting of activists consists of a room full of bearded men all shouting at once and only agreeing when the time comes to shout a slogan.

Francesca, Manrico's girlfriend, becomes Accio's friend. Accio secretly likes her and thinks that she should not stay with Manrico because "he can't be depended on". The viewer is in little doubt that Accio is also attracted to Francesca himself. At the same time, he has himself become sexually involved with the wife of his fascist friend, the market trader, who has been imprisoned for his violent political activities. She buys him a car through an installment plan.

Eventually Accio ends up leaving the Fascist party and tearing up his membership card when party members burn his brother's car. He also breaks up with his older lover, telling her that he cares for someone else, but not replying when asked if he is loved in return.

But while Accio largely pulls out of political activism, his brother is drawn deeper into revolutionary violence. After disappearing for two years, he calls home. Accio travels to meet him and telephones Francesca, who twice quickly hangs up on him. When they meet in a cafe, Manrico sees Francesca arriving unexpectedly, but also the police who have perhaps been tailing her or tapping her telephone. He flees but dies in an exchange of (handgun) fire with the pursuing police.

Accio then breaks into the corrupt and inefficient housing office to seize the waiting keys and the records of the homeless. He distributes keys and a party of homeless families take possession in the middle of the same night. The film ends with Accio living with his family, including his brother's small son.

== Cast ==
- Elio Germano as Accio Benassi
- Riccardo Scamarcio as Manrico Benassi
- Angela Finocchiaro as Amelia Benassi
- Massimo Popolizio as Ettore Benassi
- Ascanio Celestini as Padre Cavalli
- Diane Fleri as Francesca
- Alba Rohrwacher as Violetta Benassi
- Vittorio Emanuele Propizio as Young Accio
- Claudio Botosso as Prof. Montagna
- Ninni Bruschetta as Segretario Bombacci
- Anna Bonaiuto as Bella Nastri
- Luca Zingaretti as Mario Nastri
- Pasquale Sammarco as Padre Tosi
- Lorenzo Pagani as Bertini

== Reception ==
The film received positive reviews from critics. The review aggregator Rotten Tomatoes reported that 86% of critics gave the film positive reviews, based on 63 reviews with an average rating of 7/10. Metacritic reported the film had an average score of 71 out of 100, based on 19 reviews, indicating "generally favorable reviews".

== Awards ==
The film won four David di Donatello Awards—Best Actor (Elio Germano), Best Supporting Actress (Angela Finocchiaro), Best Screenplay, Best Editing.
