= Those Happy Years =

2013 Italian drama film

Those Happy Years (Anni felici)
- Film poster
- Directed by: Daniele Luchetti
- Written by: Daniele Luchetti, Sandro Petraglia, Stefano Rulli, Caterina Venturini
- Starring: Kim Rossi Stuart, Micaela Ramazzotti
- Cinematography: Claudio Collepiccolo
- Edited by: Mirco Garrone
- Music by: Franco Piersanti
- Distributed by: Cattleya
- Release dates: 7 September 2013 (TIFF); 3 October 2013 (Italy)
- Running time: 100 minutes
- Country: Italy
- Language: Italian

Those Happy Years (Italian: Anni felici) is a 2013 Italian drama film directed by Daniele Luchetti. It was screened in the Special Presentation section at the 2013 Toronto International Film Festival.

== Cast ==
- Kim Rossi Stuart as Guido
- Micaela Ramazzotti as Serena
- Martina Gedeck as Helke
- Samuel Garofalo as Dario
- Niccolò Calvagna as Paolo
- Benedetta Buccellato as Nonna Marcella
- Pia Engleberth as Nonna Marina
- Angelique Cavallari as Michelle
