= The Keys to the House =

2004 film

The Keys to the House (Le chiavi di casa)
- Directed by: Gianni Amelio
- Written by: Giuseppe Pontiggia (novel); Gianni Amelio; Sandro Petraglia; Stefano Rulli
- Produced by: Elda Ferri; Enzo Porcelli
- Starring: Kim Rossi Stuart; Charlotte Rampling; Andrea Rossi; Alla Faerovich; Pierfrancesco Favino
- Edited by: Simona Paggi
- Music by: Franco Piersanti
- Distributed by: Lions Gate Entertainment
- Release date: 10 September 2004 (Italy)
- Running time: 105 minutes
- Country: Italy
- Language: Italian

The Keys to the House (Italian: Le chiavi di casa) is a 2004 Italian drama film based on the story Born Twice (Italian title: Nati due volte) telling the story of a young father meeting his handicapped son for the first time and attempts to forge a relationship with the teenager. The film was directed by Gianni Amelio. Although selected as the Italian entry for the Best Foreign Language Film at the 77th Academy Awards, it was not nominated.

== Plot ==
Gianni (Kim Rossi Stuart) has left his handicapped son Paolo (Andrea Rossi) in the care of others since his birth. He has not been able to cope with Paolo’s mother’s death in childbirth or that Paolo has not developed like other children because of his handicap. Paolo is now fifteen and is about to meet his father for the first time. Gianni has been asked by his son's caretakers to bring him to a Berlin hospital for yearly tests and check-ups. According to their doctor, the "shock" of meeting his father could help Paolo in his treatment.

When Gianni boards the night train on which Paolo is already travelling, it is Gianni who is in for a shock. Paolo does not seem particularly impressed nor disturbed by this first meeting with his biological father. He seems more interested in his Game Boy instead. Gianni and Nicole (Charlotte Rampling) meet accidentally in the Berlin hospital and, even though he feels awkward and almost ashamed at being seen as having fathered "such a child", they connect. Nicole has spent her life caring for her daughter and could teach Gianni something if only he were willing to listen. Through a series of chance encounters aided by a book left behind by Nicole (Born Twice Italian title: Nati due volte, incidentally the book on which the film is based), they meet several times and get talking.

== Reception ==
=== Critical response ===
The Keys to the House has an approval rating of 77% on review aggregator website Rotten Tomatoes, based on 26 reviews, and an average rating of 6.8/10. The website's critical consensus states: "Favoring subtlety over cheap sentimentality, The Keys to the House is emotionally honest, compassionate, and a genuine tear-jerker". Metacritic assigned the film a weighted average score of 74 out of 100, based on 13 critics, indicating "generally favorable reviews".

=== Awards and nominations ===
The film has won nine awards and fourteen nominations.

=== 2004 ===
In the same year of its release (2004) it won four awards and one nomination in the Venice Film Festival:

Award	Category/Recipient
'CinemAvvenire' Award	Best Film Gianni Amelio
Pasinetti Award	Best Actor Kim Rossi Stuart
Pasinetti Award	Best Film Gianni Amelio
Sergio Trasatti Award	Gianni Amelio

Nomination	Category/Recipient
Golden Lion	Gianni Amelio

=== 2005 ===
In the second year (2005) it won:

One award and six nominations in the David di Donatello Awards:

Award	Category/Recipient(s)
David	Best Sound (Migliore Fonico di Presa Diretta) Alessandro Zanon

Nomination	Category/Recipient(s)
David	Best Actor (Migliore Attore Protagonista) Kim Rossi Stuart
David	Best Director (Migliore Regista) Gianni Amelio
David	Best Editing (Migliore Montatore) Simona Paggi
David	Best Film (Miglior Film) Enzo Porcelli Gianni Amelio (director)
David	Best Music (Migliore Musicista) Franco Piersanti
David	Best Screenplay (Migliore Sceneggiatura) Gianni Amelio Sandro Petraglia Stefano Rulli

Three awards and five nominations in the Italian National Syndicate of Film Journalists:

Award	Category/Recipient(s)
Silver Ribbon	Best Cinematography (Migliore Fotografia) Luca Bigazzi
Silver Ribbon	Best Director (Regista del Miglior Film Italiano) Gianni Amelio
Silver Ribbon	Best Sound (Migliore Presa Diretta) Alessandro Zanon

Nomination	Category/Recipient(s)
Silver Ribbon	Best Actor (Migliore Attore Protagonista) Kim Rossi Stuart
Silver Ribbon	Best Editing (Miglior Montaggio) Simona Paggi
Silver Ribbon	Best Producer (Migliore Produttore) Enzo Porcelli
Silver Ribbon	Best Screenplay (Miglior Sceneggiatura) Gianni Amelio Sandro Petraglia Stefano Rulli
Silver Ribbon	Best Supporting Actor (Migliore Attore non Protagonista) Pierfrancesco Favino

and two nominations in the Young Artist Awards:

Nomination	Category/Recipient(s)
Young Artist Awards	Best International Feature Film
Young Artist Awards	Best Performance in an International Feature Film - Leading Young Performance Andrea Rossi

=== 2006 ===
In the third year (2006) it won:

One award in the Turia Awards:

Award	Category/Recipients(s)
Turia Awards	Best Foreign Film Gianni Amelio

== See also ==
- List of submissions to the 77th Academy Awards for Best Foreign Language Film
- List of Italian submissions for the Academy Award for Best Foreign Language Film
