= Edoardo Albinati =

Italian writer

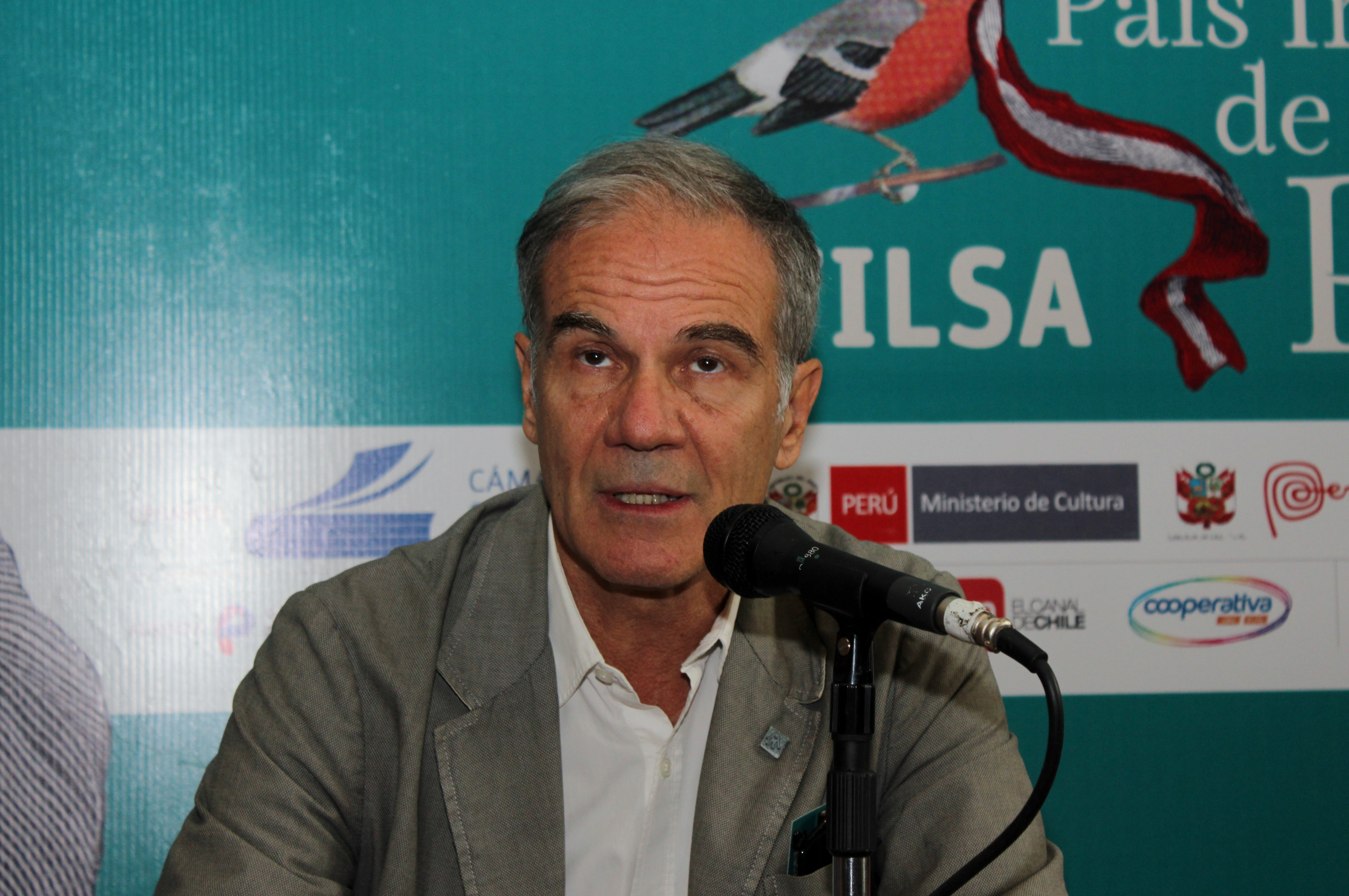
- Albinati at the 2018 Santiago International Book Fair
- Born: 11 October 1956 (age 69); Rome, Italy
- Occupation: Writer

Edoardo Albinati (born 11 October 1956) is an Italian novelist.

== Life and career ==
Born in Rome, after Albinati started his career as a translator, a script adaptor and editor of the magazine Nuovi Argomenti. He made his debut as a writer in 1988, with a collection of short stories titled Arabeschi della vita morale. His 1989 novel Il polacco lavatore di vetri was adapted into a film, The Ballad of the Windshield Washers by Peter Del Monte. Since the mid-1990s he has worked at the Rebibbia prison as a teacher. In 2002 and in 2004 he took part to two UN High Commission for Refugees missions in Afghanistan and Chad, also writing several reports published by the newspapers Corriere della Sera and La Repubblica.

In 2004 Albinati won the Viareggio Prize with the novel Svenimenti. In 2006 he co-wrote with actor Filippo Timi the novel Tuttalpiù muoio, which later Timi adapted into a stage drama. In 2015 he collaborated with Matteo Garrone for the screenplay of the fantasy film Tale of Tales. In 2016 he won the Strega Prize with the semi-autobiographical novel La scuola cattolica.

Selected English Translations

- Coming Back: Diary of a Mission to Afghanistan (2014, trans. Howard Curtis)
- The Catholic School (2019, trans. Antony Shugaar)
