= La nostra vita =

2010 film

- Film poster
- Directed by: Daniele Luchetti
- Written by: Daniele Luchetti; Sandro Petraglia; Stefano Rulli
- Produced by: Gina Gardini
- Starring: Elio Germano; Raoul Bova; Isabella Ragonese; Luca Zingaretti; Stefania Montorsi; Giorgio Colangeli
- Cinematography: Claudio Collepiccolo
- Edited by: Mirco Garrone
- Music by: Franco Piersanti
- Production company: Cattleya
- Distributed by: 01 Distribution
- Release dates: 14 May 2010 (Cannes); 21 May 2010 (Italy)
- Running time: 93 minutes
- Countries: Italy; France
- Language: Italian

La nostra vita is a 2010 French-Italian drama film directed by Daniele Luchetti, starring Elio Germano. It competed for the Palme d'Or at the 2010 Cannes Film Festival, with Elio Germano sharing the prize for Best Actor with Javier Bardem for his role in the Mexican film Biutiful directed by Alejandro González Iñárritu.

== Plot ==
Claudio (Elio Germano) is a young construction worker who lives a happy life with his pregnant wife Elena (Isabella Ragonese) and their two children in Rome. They manage together their daily difficulties with love and complicity. One day at the construction site, Claudio discovers the corpse of an illegal Romanian worker who died while working intoxicated, but decides not to report the discovery for fear that the site will be closed down. His life is further struck when Elena dies while giving birth to their third son Vasco, right after their vacation. This is the beginning of a new phase for Claudio, who now concentrates on becoming richer, and buying "things" for his three sons in the hopes of making them happier after losing their mom. Claudio blackmails his employer, Porcari, about the dead Romanian worker, demanding his own construction site to supervise in exchange for his silence. Claudio obtains the whole construction business, not only the wall building business.

Claudio obtains 50,000 Euros from his drug-dealing neighbour Ari to start the work. One day, the Romanian's former lover Gabriela (Alina Madalina Berzunteanu) and his son Andrei (Marius Ignat) come looking for the missing man, but Claudio does not tell them about the truth. He befriends Gabriela and has sex with her. He offers Andrei a job, and allows him to stay at his apartment with his family. More and more difficulties, however, put Claudio in dire straits. Claudio soon runs out of money and time. The construction work is behind schedule. Claudio also cannot pay the illegal workers, and they eventually quit and steal equipment from Claudio. Later Claudio tells Andrei the truth about his father and Andrei leaves, in anger. Claudio asks Porcari to give him more time for the construction job, but is rejected.

Claudio eventually turns to his brother, Piero (Raoul Bova) and sister, Loredana (Stefania Montorsi) to borrow more money for the work. He hires more expensive workers and manages to finish the construction work. He is also able to repay his debts. He encourages Piero to show Gabriela his love. Andrei, however, is still angry with Claudio. The film ends with Claudio allowing all of his children to sleep on his bed he once shared with Elena. Previously, he had forbidden his children to play in, which shows he has changed his vision of life and now gives importance to what has real value.

== Cast ==
- Elio Germano as Claudio
- Isabella Ragonese as Elena
- Raoul Bova as Piero
- Stefania Montorsi as Liliana
- Luca Zingaretti as Ari
- Giorgio Colangeli as Porcari
- Alina Madalina Berzunteanu as Gabriela
- Marius Ignat as Andrein
- Awa Ly as Celeste
- Emiliano Campagnola as Vittorio

== Production ==
Cattleya produced the 6.2 million Euro film together with Rai Cinema and French company Babe Films. The project received money from the Italian Culture Ministry, the CNC and Canal+ via pre-sales.

== Release ==
The film premiered in Italy on 21 May 2010.

== Reception ==
=== Box office ===
As of 20 June 2010, Box Office Mojo reported that the film had made 3,805,514 dollars (3,075,807 Euro) at the Italian box office.
