= Ciak =

Italian film magazine

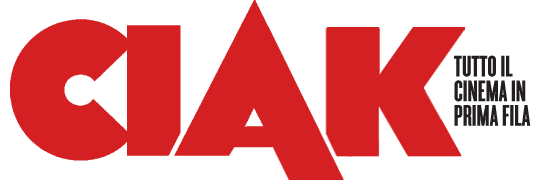
- Ciak's official logo
- Categories: Film magazine
- Frequency: Monthly
- Circulation: 100,000
- Founded: 1985; 41 years ago
- Company: Arnoldo Mondadori Editore
- Country: Italy
- Based in: Milan
- Language: Italian

Ciak is a popular Italian film magazine published in Milan, Italy. It is the most popular film magazine in Italy. The title is the Italian word (also spelled ciac) for a film clapperboard.

== History and profile ==
Ciak was established in 1985 by Arnoldo Mondadori Editore. Each year the magazine publishes the Power List: a list of the most influential figures in the Italian film industry.

== Ciak d'oro ==
The Ciak d'oro (Golden Ciak) is an Italian annual film award established in 1986. It is the only award of Italian cinema that has the audience as its jury: readers vote for best film, best director, best leading actors, and best foreign film of the season. Best supporting actors as well as technical categories and best debut are selected by a jury of film critics and specialized journalists.

=== Italian film categories ===
Public voted categories

- Best Motion Picture – Drama
- Best Motion Picture – Comedy
- Best Director
- Best Emerging Director
- Best Lead Actor
- Best Lead Actress
- Best Original Song
- Best Reveleation of the Year
- Best Playbill

Judge categories

- Best Supporting Actor
- Best Supporting Actress
- Best Producer
- Best Screenplay
- Best Cinematography
- Best Sound
- Best Product Design
- Best Editing
- Best Soundtrack
- Best Costume Design

=== International film categories ===
- Best Film
- Best Blockbuster Film
- Best Animated Film
- Best Director
- Best Actor
- Best Actress

=== Television series awards ===
==== Public-voted categories ====
- Best Italian Television Serie
- Best International Television Serie
- Best Youth Audience Television Serie
- Best Italian Lead Actor
- Best Italian Lead Actress
- Best Youth Audience Lead Performance
- Best International Lead Performance

=== Special awards ===
- Golden Superciak – Film
- Golden Superciak – Television Serie of the Year
- Most Innovative Television Serie

== See also ==
- List of magazines published in Italy
