= Globo d'oro =

Italian prize of cinematography

Globo D'oro or Italian Golden Globe
- Current: 65th Globo D'oro
- Globo D'oro gold silhouette
- Awarded for: Excellence in the Italian film industry
- Location: Rome
- Country: Italy
- Presented by: Foreign Press Association in Italy
- First award: 1959; 67 years ago
- Website: stampaestera.org/categoria/globo-doro/

The Globo d'oro (internationally known as Italian Golden Globe) is an Italian annual film award. It was founded in 1959 by the Foreign Press Association in Italy. The Globo d'oro Awards for Italian cinema are given by the Foreign Press.

The first awards ceremony took place in 1960 and was won by the film The Facts of Murder by Pietro Germi.

The edition 1981–1982 saw the participation of the President of the Italian Republic, Sandro Pertini.

The Premio alla carriera (Lifetime Achievement Award) was created in 1995.

The European Golden Globe was created in 2005.

== The prizes ==
- Golden Globe for Best Film
- Golden Globe for Best First Feature
- Golden Globe for Best Director
- Golden Globe for Best Actor
- Golden Globe for Best Actress
- Golden Globe for Best Actor revelation
- Golden Globe for Best Actress revelation
- Golden Globe for Best Screenplay
- Golden Globe for Best Film
- Golden Globe for the Best Short Film
- Golden Globe for Best Music
- Golden Globe for Career
- Golden Globe for Best European Film
- European Golden Globe
- Golden Globe for Lifetime Achievement
- Gran Premio della stampa estera (Grand Prize of the Foreign Press)
