= 61st Locarno Film Festival =

Film festival in Locarno, Switzerland

- Opening film: Brideshead Revisited directed by Julian Jarrold
- Closing film: Back Soon directed by Solveig Anspach
- Location: Locarno, Switzerland
- Founded: 1946
- Awards: Golden Leopard: Parque Vía directed by Enrique Rivero.
- Artistic director: Frederic Marie
- Festival date: Opening: 6 August 2008; Closing: 16 August 2008
- Website: LFF

Locarno Film Festival
- 62nd 60th

The 61st Locarno Film Festival was held from 6 to 16 August 2008 in Locarno, Switzerland. The opening film of the festival was the European premiere of Brideshead Revisited directed by Julian Jarrold. The closing film of the festival was the European premiere of Back Soon directed by Solveig Anspach.

This was a successful year at the festival for distribution deals with five of 18 films in-competition getting international distribution deals at the festival. Of the fourteen films in competition that started the festival looking for a sales agent ten found a seller.

Gianfranco Pannone's documentary II sol del'awenire (Tomorrow's Sun) attracted controversy from Italian Minister of Culture Sandro Bondi. The film has sections about the Red Brigades, the Italian Marxist–Leninist group in the 70s and 80s. Bondi said this was offense to family members of those killed in the Years of Lead. He suggested the state should not have funded the picture. This drew criticism from industry professionals at Locarno who defended the film.

The Golden Leopard, the festival's top prize, was awarded to Parque Via directed by Enrique Rivero. This was the first Mexican film to win the Golden Leopard.

== Official Jury ==
- Paolo Sorrentino, Italian director
- Bertha Navarro, Mexican producer
- Masashiro Kobayashi, Japanese director
- Dani Levy, Swiss director

== Sections ==
The following films were screened in these sections:

=== Piazza Grande ===
English Title	Original Title	Director(s)	Year	Production Country
1001 Films		André Delvaux	1989	Belgium
Destiny	Al-Massir	Youssef Chahine	1997	France
Back Soon		Sólveig Anspach	2008	Iceland
Berlin Calling		Hannes Stoehr	2008	Germany
Brideshead Revisited		Julian Jarrold	2007	United Kingdom
Chaos Theory		Marcos Siega	2007	USA
Choke		Clark Gregg	2007	USA
Dead in 3 Days 2	In 3 Tagen Bist Du Tot 2	Andreas Prochaska	2008	Austria
Khamsa		Karim Dridi	2008	France
The Girl from Monaco	La Fille De Monaco	Anne Fontaine	2008	France
Lecture 21	Lezione 21	Alessandro Baricco	2008	Italy
Marcello Marcello		Denis Rabaglia	2008	Switzerland
Night and the City		Jules Dassin	1950	USA
North Face	Nordwand	Philipp Stölzl	2008	Germany
Outlander		Howard McCain	2008	USA
Red Wood Pigeon	Palombella Rossa	Nanni Moretti	1989	Italy
One Day You'll Understand	Plus Tard Tu Comprendras	Amos Gitai	2008	France
Retouches (short)		Georges Schwizgebel	2008	Switzerland
Son of Rambow		Garth Jennings	2007	France
The Eternity Man		Julien Temple	2008	Australia
I know (short)	Vem (short)	Jan Cvitkovič	2008	Slovenia

=== International Competition ===
English Title	Original Title	Director(s)	Year	Production Country
33 Scenes of Life	33 Sceny z zycia	Malgoska Szumowska	2008	Germany
Daytime Drinking		NOH Young-Seok	2008	South Korea
Dioses		Josué Méndez	2008	Peru
All That She Wants	Elle Veut Le Chaos	Denis Côté	2008	Canada
Katia's Sister	Het Zusje Van Katia	Mijke de Jong	2007	Netherlands
Kisses		Lance Daly	2008	Ireland
Feast of Villains	Liu Mang De Sheng Yan	Pan Jianlin	2008	China
Black Sea	Mar Nero	Federico Bondi	2008	Italy
March	März	Klaus Händl	2008	Austria
Nowhere Promised Land	Nulle Part Terre Promise	Emmanuel Finkiel	2008	France
Parque Via		Enrique Rivero	2008	Mexico
Sleep Furiously		Gideon Koppel	2007	United Kingdom
Autumn	Sonbahar	Özcan Alper	2008	Germany
Story of Jen		François Rotger	2008	France
The Market - A Tale Of Trade		Ben Hopkins	2008	Germany
Doomed Love	Um Amor De Perdição	Mário Barroso	2008	Portugal
Another Man	Un Autre Homme	Lionel Baier	2008	Switzerland
Yuri's Day	Yuriev Den	Kirill Serebrennikov	2008	Russia

=== Filmmakers of the Present ===
The Concorso Cineasti del Presente, also known as the Filmmakers of the Present Competition, showcases first and second feature films from emerging filmmakers.

Filmmakers of the Present

Original Title	English Title	Director(s)	Year	Production Country
A Zona	And Zona	Sandro Aguilar	2008	Portugal
Alicia En El Pais	Alicia in the Country	Esteban Larrain	2008	Chile
Beket	Boe	Davide Manuli	2008	Italy
El Brau Blau	The Blue Brau	Daniel V. Villamediana	2008	Spain
El Sueño Del Perro	Dog's Dream	Paulo Pécora	2008	Argentina
Filmefobia	Filmia	Kiko Goifman	2008	Brazil
Je Ne Suis Pas Morte	I'm not Dead	Jean-Charles Fitoussi	2008	France
Kinogamma Part One: East		Siegfried	2008	France
Kinogamma Part Two: Far East		Siegfried	2008	France
La Forteresse	The Fortress	Fernand Melgar	2008	Switzerland
La Orilla Que Se Abisma	The Shore that is Abyssed	Gustavo Fontan	2008	Argentina
La Vie Ailleurs	Life Elsewhere	David Teboul	2008	France
Napoli Piazza Municipio	Naples Piazza Municipio	Bruno Oliviero	2008	Italy
Par Dzimteniti	For the Homeland	Laila Pakalniņa, Maris Saadi	2008	Latvia
Prince of Broadway		Sean Baker	2008	USA
Shorei X	First Order X	Kohki Yoshida	2007	Japan
Welate Efsane	Legal Country	Rahim Zabihi	2008	Germany

Filmmakers of the Present - Out of Competition

Original Title	English Title	Director(s)	Year	Production Country
Avant Que Tu Reviennes	Before you Come Back	Pascal Rambert	2008	France
Giu' Le Mani	John the Hands	Danilo Catti	2008	Switzerland
Le Petit Chaperon Rouge	Little Red Riding Hood	Shinji Aoyama	2008	France
Malika S'Est Envolee	Malika Took Off	Jean-Paul Civeyrac	2008	France

=== Open Doors: Screenings ===
Original Title	English Title	Director(s)	Year	Production Country
Baixio Das Bestas	Basso Das Beasts	Cláudio Assis	2006	Brazil
Blanca		Alejo Crisóstomo	2006	Guatemala
Cochochi		Laura Amelia Guzmán and Israel Cárdenas	2007	Mexico
Cuando Me Toque A Mi	When I Touch Me	Víctor Arregui	2008	Ecuador
Desde Lejos	From Afar	Alejandro Fernandez Almendras	2006	Chile
El Amarillo	The Yellow	Sergio Martín Mazza	2006	Argentina
El Camino	The Way	Ishtar Yasin	2008	Costa Rica
El Cielo, La Tierra Y La Lluvia	Heaven, Earth and Rain	José Luis Torres Leiva	2008	Chile
El Cuarto Del Fondo	The Bottom Room	Ana Guevara and Leticia Jorge	2007	Uruguay
El Árbol	The Tree	Gustavo Fontan	2007	Argentina
Ellas Se Aman	They Love Each Other	Laura Astorga	2008	Costa Rica
En La Barra Hay Un Cerebro	In the Bar There is a Brain	Oscar Ruiz Navia	2005	Colombia
En La Cama	In Bed	Matías Bize	2005	Chile
Familia Tortuga	Tortuga Family	Ruben Imaz Castro	2006	Mexico
I Love Pinochet		Marcela Said Cares	2001	Spain
Interior Bajo Izquierda	Interior under Left	Daniel Vega Vidal, Diego Vega Vidal	2008	Peru
Jogo De Cena	Playing	Eduardo Coutinho	2008	Brazil
La Sombra Del Caminante	The Shadow of the Walker	Ciro Guerra	2005	Colombia
Lo Más Bonito Y Mis Mejores Años	The Most Beautiful and My Best Years	Martin Boulocq	2005	Bolivia
Lo Que Trae La Lluvia	What Brings the Rain	Alejandro Fernandez Almendras	2007	Chile
Madeinusa		Claudia Llosa	2006	Spain
Postales De Leningrado	Postcards from Leningrad	Mariana Rondón	2007	Venezuela
Qak'Aslemal	Hcklemal	Alejo Crisóstomo	2007	Guatemala
Santiago		João Salles	2006	Brazil
Stranded, I'Ve Come From A Plane That Crashed On The Mountains...		Gonzalo Arijon	2007	France
Temporal		Paz Fabrega	2006	Costa Rica
Wadley		Matias Meyer	2008	Mexico

=== Here And Away (Ici et Ailleurs) ===
Original Title	English Title	Director(s)	Year	Production Country
Bambini In Città	Children in the City	Luigi Comencini	1946	Italy
Beautiful Losers		Joshua Leonard, Aaron Rose	2008	USA
Cimap! Cento Italiani Matti A Pechino	Cimap! One Hundred Italians Crazy in Beijing	Giovanni Piperno	2008	Italy
Comment Albert Vit Bouger Les Montagnes	How Albert Saw the Mountains Move	Harold Vasselin	2008	France
Das Herz Von Jenin	The Heart of Jenin	Leon Geller, Marcus Vetter	2008	Germany
Diario Di Una Schizofrenica	Diary of a Schizophrenic Girl	Nelo Risi	1968	Italy
El Somni	The Dream	Christophe Farnarier	2008	Spain
Freddy Buache, Passeur Du 7Ème Art	Freddy Buache, 7th Art Passer	Michel Van Zele	2007	France
Gasolina	Gasoline	Julio Hernández Cordón	2008	Guatemala
Gegege No Kitaro Sennen Noroi Uta	Gegege No Kitaro 1,000 Yen Curse Song	Katsuhide Motoki	2008	Japan
Gegege No Kitaro	Greege's Kitaro	Katsuhide Motoki	2007	Japan
Gegege No Kitaro	Greege's Kitaro	Yukio Kaizawa	2007	Japan
Hakaba Kitaro	Hakaaba Kitaro	Masatoshi Chioka	2007	Japan
Il Sol Dell'Avvenire	Tomorrow's Sun	Gianfranco Pannone	2008	Italy
Kumo To Tulip	Catholics	Kenzō Masaoka	1943	Japan
L'Idiot	The Idiot	Pierre Léon	2008	France
Luftbusiness	Airbusiness	Dominique De Rivaz	2008	Switzerland
Momotaro, Umi No Shinpei	Momotaro, Sea New Soldiers	Mitsuyo Seo	1945	Japan
Muallaf		Yasmin Ahmad	2008	Malaysia
Non Chiederci La Parola	Don't Ask Us the Word	Elisabetta Sgarbi	2008	Italy
Parafernalia	Paraphernalia	Massimo Coppola, Giovanni Giommi	2008	Italy
Pelléas Et Mélisande, Le Chant Des Aveugles	Pelléas and Mélisande, the Song of the Blind	Philippe Béziat	2008	France
Petites Historias Das Crianças	Children's Histories Petites	Guido Lazzarini, Gabriele Salvatores, Fabio Scamoni	2008	Italy
Possibili Rapporti. Due Poeti, Due Voci	Possible Relationships. Two Poets, Two Voices	Nelo Risi	2008	Italy
Preparativi Di Fuga	Escape Preparations	Tommaso Cotronei	2008	Italy
Rata Nece Biti (Non Ci Sara' La Guerra)	Rata Nece Biti (There will be No War)	Daniele Gaglianone	2008	Italy
Servicios Prestados	Services Provided	Diego Lerman	2008	Argentina
Sognavo Le Nuvole Colorate	I Dreamed of the Colored Clouds	Mario Balsamo	2008	Italy
Stolperstein	Stumbling Block	Dörte Franke	2007	Germany
Strade Trasparenti	Transparent Roads	Augusto Contento	2008	France
Umarete Wa Mita Keredo	I Saw the Japanese when I Was Born, but	Yasujirō Ozu	1932	Japan
Un Petit Coin De Paradis	A Little Corner of Paradise	Jacqueline Veuve	2008	Switzerland
Und Das Am Montagmorgen	And that on Monday Morning	Luigi Comencini	1959	Germany

Here And Away - Borders of Europe: Six Films by Corso Salani

Original Title	English Title	Director(s)	Year	Production Country
Confini D'Europa # 1 - Ceuta E Gibilterra	Borders of Europe # 1 - Ceuta and Gibraltar	Corso Salani	2006	Italy
Confini D'Europa # 2 - Rio De Onor	Borders of Europe # 2 - Rio De Onor	Corso Salani	2006	Italy
Confini D'Europa # 3 - Imatra. Versione Integrale	Borders of Europe # 3 - Imatra. Full Version	Corso Salani	2007	Italy
Confini D'Europa # 4 - Talsi	Borders of Europe # 4 - Tali	Corso Salani	2007	Italy
Confini D'Europa # 5 - Chisinau	Borders of Europe # 5 - Chisinau	Corso Salani	2007	Italy
Confini D'Europa # 6 - Yotvata	Borders of Europe # 6 - YOTTAVA	Corso Salani	2007	Italy

Here And Away - Jeonju Digital Project 2008

Original Title	English Title	Director(s)	Year	Production Country
Expectations		Mahamat-Saleh Haroun	2008	South Korea
The Alphabet Of My Mother		Nacer Khemir	2008	South Korea
The Birthday		Idrissa Ouédraogo	2008	South Korea

Here And Away - Special Program

Original Title	English Title	Director(s)	Year	Production Country
Blackbox3 The Film		Patricia Boillat, Elena Gugliuzza	2008	Switzerland
Quattro Giorni Con Vivian	Four Days with Vivian	Silvio Soldini	2008	Italy

Here And Away / Leopards of Domani - Author's Short Films (Corti D'autore)

Original Title	English Title	Director(s)	Year	Production Country
Akmeni	Stone	Laila Pakalniņa	2008	Latvia
Balastiera#186	Ballast # 186	George Chiper, Adina Pintilie	2007	Romania
Basette	Base	Gabriele Mainetti	2008	Italy
Elso Szerelem	First Love	Ildikó Enyedi	2008	Haiti
Monsieur Sélavy - The Way It Is		Peter Volkart	2008	Switzerland

=== Leopards of Tomorrow ===
Leopards of Tomorrow (Pardi di Domani)

==== Special Program ====
Leopards of Tomorrow - Special Program
Original Title	English Title	Director(s)	Year	Production Country
Banquise	Ice Floe	Claude Barras, Céderic Louis	2005	Switzerland
Bonne Journée Monsieur M.	Good Day Mr.	Samuel Guillaume, Frédéric Guillaume	1999	Switzerland
Die Mücke	The Mosquito	Andrej Zolotuchin	2003	Switzerland
Geranienfriede	Geranium Peace	Marcel Hobi	2002	Switzerland
Hang Over		Rolf Brönnimann	2005	Switzerland
Herr Würfel	Mr. Cubes	Rafael Sommerhalder	2004	Switzerland
Jeu	Game	Georges Schwizgebel	2006	Switzerland
Joyeux Noël Félix	Merry Christmas Félix	Izabela Rieben, Sami Ben Youssef	2004	Switzerland
Nosferatu Tango		Zoltán Horvát	2002	Switzerland
Poldek		Claudius Gentinetta	2004	Switzerland
Rush		Claude Luyet, Xavier Robel	2004	Switzerland
Tarte Aux Pommes	Apple Pie	Isabelle Favez	2006	Switzerland
Une Nuit Blanche	A White Night	Maja Gehrig	2005	Switzerland
Wolkenbruch	Cloudburst	Simon Eltz	2005	Switzerland

==== International Competition ====
International Competition (Concorso Internazionale)
Original title	English title	Director(s)	Year	Production country
Babin		Isamu Hirabayashi	2008	Japan
Bagh Dad Bar Ber		Massoud Bakhshi	2008	Iran
Camille E Mariuccia	Camille and Mariuccia	Samuele Romano	2008	United Kingdom
Ciobanul Zburator	The Flying Shepherd	Catalin Musat	2008	Romania
Cuilos		Paz Fabrega	2008	Costa Rica
Dez Elefantes	Ten Elephants	Eva Randolph	2008	Brazil
Directions		Kasimir Burgess	2008	Australia
En Compagnie De La Poussière	In the Company of Dust	Jacques Molitor	2008	Belgium
Fata Galbena Care Rade	The Face Yellow that Laughs	Constantin Popescu	2008	Romania
Kaupunkilaisia	Townspeople	Juho Kuosmanen	2008	Finland
La Battue	The Battered	Guy Édoin	2008	Canada
La Route Du Nord	The North Road	Carlos Chahine	2008	France
Las Gafas	The Glasses	Alberto García Martín	2008	Spain
Le Feu, Le Sang, Les Étoiles	Fire, Blood, Stars	Caroline Deruas	2008	France
Magellan		LI Huajun	2007	China
Manden Og Mågen	The Man and the Gull	Daniel Borgman	2007	Denmark
Mörder	Murderer	Johannes Wende	2008	Germany
One In Four		Matti Harju	2008	United Kingdom
Resolution		Pavel Oreshnikov	2008	Russia
The Graffiti Of Mr Tupaia	The Graffi of Mr Tupaia	Christopher Dudman	2008	New Zealand
Toi Que J'Eusse Aimée	You that I Would Have Loved	Emmanuel Broussouloux	2007	France
Vucko		Matevz Luzar	2007	Slovenia
Well-Founded Concerns		Tim Cawley	2008	USA

==== National Competition ====
National Competition (Concorso Nazionale)
Original title	English title	Director(s)	Year	Production country
Am Galgen	On the Gallows	Pascal Bergamin	2008	Switzerland
Au Café Romand	At the Romand Café	Richard Szotyori	2008	Switzerland
Bachab	Bachaab	Ulrich Schaffner	2008	Switzerland
Beheading Of A Smiling Dog		Georg Lendorff	2008	Switzerland
Endsieg-Everything Changes In One Shot		Daniel Casparis, Niccolò Castelli	2008	Switzerland
Im Wendekreis Des Bären	In the Turn of the Bear	Ciril Braem	2008	Germany
La Délogeuse	The Dislogger	Julien Rouyet	2008	Switzerland
Nachglühen	Glow		2008	Switzerland
Racines	Roots	Eileen Hofer	2008	Switzerland
Schwitze	Sweat	Nicolas Steiner	2008	Germany
The Political Lunch		Julien Sulser	2008	Switzerland
Trèspassé	Widely	Ausonio De Sousa	2007	Switzerland
Un Dia Y Nada	One Day and Nothing	Lorenz Merz	2008	Switzerland

=== Retrospective – Nanni Moretti ===
Retrospective Nanni Moretti
Original Title	English Title	Director(s)	Year	Production Country
Antonio Ruju, Vita Di Un Anarchico Sardo	Antonio Ruju, Life of a Sardinian Anarchist	Roberto Nanni	2001	Italy
Aprile	April	Nanni Moretti	1998	Italy
Bandiera Rossa E Borsa Nera	Red Flag and Black Bag	Andrea Molaioli	2001	Italy
Bianca		Nanni Moretti	1984	Italy
Ca Cri Do Bo	As CRI Do Bo	Susanna Nicchiarelli	2001	Italy
Caos Calmo	Calm Chaos	Antonello Grimaldi	2008	Italy
Caro Diario	Daily Expensive	Nanni Moretti	1993	Italy
Caro Nanni	Dear Nanni	Francesco Conversano, Nene Grignaffini	1993	Italy
Cinema Autarchico	Aidancical Cinema	Susanna Nicchiarelli	2007	Italy
Cinéma De Notre Temps, Nanni Moretti	Cinema of Our Time, Nanni Moretti	André S. Labarthe	1990	France
Colpi Di Testa	Head Shots	Loredana Conte	2006	Italy
Come Parli Frate?	How Do you Speak Friar?	Nanni Moretti	1974	Italy
Davai Bistrè! Avanti Presto!	I Gave Bistrè! Forward Early!	Mara Chiaretti	2001	Italy
Diario D'Aprile	April Diary	Andrea Molaioli	1998	Italy
Diario Di Uno Spettatore	Diary of a Spectator	Nanni Moretti	2007	France
Domani Accadrà	Tomorrow will Happen	Daniele Luchetti	1988	Italy
Due Scene Tagliate Da Caro Diario	Two Scenes Cut by Caro Diary	Nanni Moretti	1998	Italy
Ecce bombo	Except Bomb	Nanni Moretti	1978	Italy
Film Quizz	Quiz Movie	Nanni Moretti	2008	Italy
I Notturni Maestri Cantori (Ecce Bombo)	The Nocturnal Singers Master (Except Bombo)	Susanna Nicchiarelli	2007	Italy
I Quaderni Di Luisa	Luisa's Notebooks	Isabella Sandri	2001	Italy
Il Caimano	The Caiman	Nanni Moretti	2006	Italy
Il Diario Del Caimano	The Caimano Diary	Nanni Moretti	2006	Italy
Il Giorno Della Prima Di Close-Up	The Day of the First of Close-Up	Nanni Moretti	1995	Italy
Il Grido D'Angoscia Dell'Uccello Predatore	The Anguish Cry of the Predator Bird	Nanni Moretti	2002	Italy
Il Portaborse	The Door Holder	Daniele Luchetti	1991	Italy
Il Salumificio	The Salami Factory	Alessandra Tantillo	2002	Italy
In Nome Del Popolo Italiano	In the Name of the Italian People	Valia Santella	2001	Italy
Intervista Moretti (Ecce Bombo)	Interview Moretti (Except Bombo)	Susanna Nicchiarelli	2007	Italy
Intervista Nanni (Io Sono Un Autarchico)	Interview Nanni (I Am an Autarchic)	Susanna Nicchiarelli	2007	Italy
Io Sono Un Autarchico	I Am an Autarchic	Nanni Moretti	1976	Italy
L'Acqua In Mezzo	Water in the Middle	Daria Menozzi	2002	Italy
L'Implacabile Tenente Rossi	The Relentless Lieutenant Rossi	Francesco Calogero	2001	Italy
La Cosa	Thing	Nanni Moretti	1990	Italy
La Messa È Finita	The Mass is over	Nanni Moretti	1985	Italy
La Sconfitta	Defeat	Nanni Moretti	1973	Italy
La Seconda Volta	The Second Time	Mimmo Calopresti	1995	France
La Stanza Del Figlio	The Son of the Son	Nanni Moretti	2001	Italy
Notte Italiana	Italian Night	Carlo Mazzacurati	1987	Italy
Padre Padrone	Master Father	Paolo and Vittorio Taviani	1977	Italy
Palombella Rossa Extra	Extra Red Palombella	Nanni Moretti	2007	Italy
Paté De Bourgeois	Bourgeois	Nanni Moretti	1973	Italy
Pubblico Di Merda (Sogni D'Oro)	Shit Audience (Golden Dreams)	Susanna Nicchiarelli	2007	Italy
Scalamara		Giuseppe M. Gaudino	2001	Italy
Sogni D'Oro	Sweet Dreams	Nanni Moretti	1981	Italy
Te Lo Leggo Negli Occhi	I Read it in the Eyes	Valia Santella	2004	Italy
The Last Customer		Nanni Moretti	2003	Italy
Zappaterra		César Meneghetti, Elisabetta Pandimiglio	2002	Italy
Nanni Moretti - White Paper Viewer (Carta bianca Spettatore)
Dillinger È Morto	Dillinger Died	Marco Ferreri	1969	Italy
I Sovversivi	The Subversives	Paolo and Vittorio Taviani	1967	Italy
La ricotta		Pier Paolo Pasolini	1963	Italy
Lola		Jacques Demy	1961	Italy
Lásky Jedné Plavovlásky	Love One Blonde	Miloš Forman	1965	Czechoslovakia
Nihon No Yoru To Kiri	Japanese Night and Cut	Nagisa Ōshima	1960	Japan
Nostra Signora Dei Turchi	Our Lady of the Turks	Carmelo Bene	1968	Italy
Saturday Night And Sunday Morning		Karel Reisz	1960	United Kingdom
The Rain People		Francis Ford Coppola	1969	USA
Walkower	Walkover	Jerzy Skolimovski	1965	Poland
Nanni Moretti - White Paper Merchant (Carta bianca Esercente)
A Fost Sau N-A Fost?	Was it or Wasn't It?	Corneliu Porumboiu	2006	Romania
A Guide to Recognizing Your Saints		Dito Montiel	2006	USA
Die Zweite Heimat (Episode 1)	Heimat (Episode 1)	Edgar Reitz	1992	Germany
Die Zweite Heimat (Episode 10)	Heimat (Episode 10)	Edgar Reitz	1992	Germany
L'Imbalsamatore	The Embalmer	Matteo Garrone	2002	Italy
La Ville Est Tranquille	The City is Quiet	Robert Guédiguian	2000	France
Nema-Ye Nazdik	Close-Up	Abbas Kiarostami	1990	Iran
Riff-Raff		Ken Loach	1991	United Kingdom
S.E.R. - Svoboda Eto Rai	SER "Freedom Here is a Paradise	Sergei Bodrov	1989	Soviet Union
Vanya on 42nd Street		Louis Malle	1994	USA
When We Were Kings		Leon Gast	1997	USA

=== Tribute To - Cinematek ===
Tribute To Cinémathèque Royale De Belgique
Original Title	English Title	Director(s)	Year	Production Country
Big Shave		Martin Scorsese	1967	USA
Flaming Creatures		Jack Smith	1963	USA
Free Radicals		Len Lye	1958	United Kingdom
Hen Hop		Norman McLaren	1949	Canada
Maudite Soit La Guerre	Cursed be War	Alfred Machin	1914	Belgium
Saïda A Enleve Manneken Pis	Saida Has Removed Manneken	Alfred Machin	1913	Belgium
Soliloquy		Steve Dwoskin	1967	United Kingdom
Vase De Noces	See Noces	Thierry Zéno	1974	Belgium
W.R.-Misterije Organizma	W.R.-Mystery of the Organism	Dušan Makavejev	1971	Yugoslavia

=== Juries Film ===
Original Title	English Title	Director(s)	Year	Production Country
Andarilho	Wanderer	Cao Guimarães	2007	Brazil
Bootleg Film		Masahiro Kobayashi	1998	Japan
Bure Baruta	Bre Balta	Goran Paskaljević	1998	Macedonia
De La Guerre	On War	Bertrand Bonello	2008	France
Dealer		Benedek Fliegauf	2004	Haiti
El Laberinto Del Fauno	THE FAUNE LABYRINT	Guillermo del Toro	2006	Mexico
Fuori Dalle Corde	Out of the Ropes	Fulvio Bernasconi	2007	Switzerland
L'Enfant Endormi	The Sleeping Child	Jean-Jacques Andrien	2004	Belgium
L'Uomo In Più	The Extra Man	Paolo Sorrentino	2001	Italy
La Mujer Sin Cabeza	The Headless Woman	Lucrecia Martel	2008	France
La Rabia	The Rage	Albertina Carri	2008	Argentina
Moartea Domnului Lazarescu	The Death of Mr. Lazarescu	Cristi Puiu	2005	Romania
Szép Napok	Nice Days	Kornél Mundruczó	2003	Haiti
The Band'S Visit		Eran Kolirin	2007	France
Voro-Nova		Dirk (Dick) Rijneke, Mildred Van Leeuwaarden	1985	Netherlands
Väter	Fathers	Dani Levy	2002	Germany

=== Pardo of Honor ===
Original Title	English Title	Director(s)	Year	Production Country
Kadosh	Stringent	Amos Gitai	1999	Israel
Kippur		Amos Gitai	2000	Israel
News From Home		Amos Gitai	2006	France
Yom Yom	Om Om	Amos Gitai	1998	France

=== Play Forward ===
Original Title	English Title	Director(s)	Year	Production Country
113Th		Talgat Bektursunov	2006	Kazakhstan
18 Beautiful Women		Lina Bertucci	2008	USA
A Magnetic Space		Pierre Coulibeuf	2008	France
Aka Ana	Ana	Antoine d'Agata	2008	France
Angel		Vuk Mitevski	2008	Macedonia
Anorexia. Storia Di Un'Immagine	Anorexia. History of an Image	Leandro Manuel Emede	2008	Italy
Beijing Sky		Olivo Barbieri	2007	Italy
Bernadette		Duncan Campbell	2008	United Kingdom
Boca De Tabla	Table Mouth	Teresa Serrano	2007	Mexico
Claustrophobic Happiness		Tommaso Cardile	2007	USA
Derniers Mots	Last Words	Arno Hagers, Erik Lieshout, Reinier Van Brummelen	2008	Netherlands
Desertogrigio		Maria Arena	2008	Italy
Ea2		Vincent Dieutre	2007	France
El Pejesapo	The Pespo	José Luis Sepulveda	2007	Chile
Fone Fur Follies		Vivian Ostrovsky	2008	USA
Foxglove		Kayt Jones, Jay Rodan	2008	USA
Fuego Amigo	Figure Friend	Miguel Angel Rios	2007	Mexico
Glima		Nicolo Massazza	2008	Italy
Grand Prix		Stephen Dean	2006	USA
Hitler Vs Gandhi		Maia Guarnaccia	2008	Italy
Hotel Roccalba	Roccalba Hotel	Josef Dabernig	2008	Austria
Il Ciclope	The Cyclope	Debra Werblud	2008	Italy
Immutable Dream Of Snow Lion		Riccardo Spinotti	2008	USA
Jardim Invisivel	Invisible Garden	Roberto Bellini	2008	Brazil
Je Flotterai Sans Envie	I will Float without Desire	Frank Beauvais	2008	France
La Fura In Vivo	The Fura in Vivo	Matteo Minetto	2008	France
La Possibilite D'Une Ile	The Possibility of an Island	Michel Houellebecq	2008	France
Marlene Kuntz Vs Fräulein Else	Marlene Kuntz vs Miss Else	Paul Czinner	1928	Germany
Meeting Vincent Gallo		Julien Hallard	2007	France
Migration		Doug Aitken	2008	USA
Ne Pas Sonner	Do not Ring	Vivian Ostrovsky	2008	France
Our City Dreams		Chiara Clemente	2008	USA
Our Lady'S Forever		Anna Konik	2007	Poland
Paper Collection		Shannon Plumb	2007	USA
Plan Iode	Plan Iodiode	Jeanne Susplugas	2008	France
Pripyat		Nicky Larkin	2007	Ireland
Saltos	Jumping	Gregorio Graziosi	2008	Brazil
Sebastião, O Homem Que Bebia Querosene	Sebastião, the Man Who Drank Kerosene	Carlosmagno Rodrigues	2007	Brazil
Sekwens	Sequence	Robert Sowa	2007	Poland
Solidao Publica		Daniel Aragão	2008	Brazil
Tell		Erwin Wurm	2008	Austria
The Crystal Gaze		Ursula Mayer	2007	United Kingdom
The Deboard		Tobias Zielony	2008	Germany
The Earring		Nicholas & Sheila Pye	2008	Canada
The Moving Town		Alberto Nacci	2008	Italy
This Smell Of Sex		Danielle Arbid	2008	France
Together		Shannon Plumb	2008	USA
Tramas	Plots	Augusto Contento	2008	France
Trance (1–10)		José Luis Torres Leiva	2008	Chile
Trip On A Piece Of Wood		Sebastian Gandt	2008	Switzerland
Vols		Veaceslav Druta	2007	France
Walpurgis	Wapurgis	Frédéric Choffat	2008	Switzerland
Wart. La Bellezza Della Tragedia	Wart. the Beauty of the Tragedy	Leandro Manuel Emede	2007	Italy
Zadnja Zelja	The Last Cabbage	Daniel Lambo	2008	Belgium
10 Years of Point, Ligne, Plan
A Place We Call Home		Emmanuelle Laure Antille	2006	Switzerland
Brasilia/Chandigarh		Louidgi Beltrame	2008	France
Can You Go Quickly To The Sun ?		Catherine Dalfin	2008	France
Invisible To The Rest		Emmanuelle Laure Antille	2006	Switzerland
Pendant Ce Temps, Dans Une Autre Partie De La Forêt	Meanwhile, in Another Part of the Forest	Arnold Pasquier	2007	France
Perfect Day		Ange Leccia	2007	France
Rice Bowl Hill Incident		Christian Merlhiot	2008	Japan
Image Forum Program
Mitate -Resemble-		Nobuhiro Aihara, Kazuhiro Goshima, Takashi Ishida, Tomoyasu Murata, Takena Nagao, Masahiro Osuga, Ryohei Shimada, Keiichi Tanaami, Mitsuo Toyama	2008	Japan
Le Fresnoy Institute Program
Abena		Amel Elkamel	2008	France
All Work		Nicolas Giraud	2008	France
Brises		Enrique Ramirez	2008	France
Faire Le Mur	Wall	Bertille Bak	2008	France
Planet A		Momoko Seto	2008	France

=== Raimondo Rezzonico Prize To the Best Independent Manufacturer ===
Original Title	English Title	Director(s)	Year	Production Country
Safe		Todd Haynes	1995	USA

== Independent Sections ==
=== Critics Week ===
The Semaine de la Critique is an independent section, created in 1990 by the Swiss Association of Film Journalists in partnership with the Locarno Film Festival.

Original Title	English Title	Director(s)	Year	Production Country
Apology Of An Economic Hit Man		Stelios Kouloglou	2008	Greece
Bill - Das Absolute Augenmass	Bill - The Absolute Size of the Eye	Erich Schmid	2008	Switzerland
Estrada Real Da Cachaça	Royal Road of Cachaça	Pedro Urano	2008	Brazil
Fyra Fruar Och En Man	Four Wives and a Man	Nahid Persson Sarvestani	2007	Sweden
Latawce	Kites	Beata Dzianowicz	2008	Poland
No More Smoke Signals		Fanny Bräuning	2008	Switzerland
Nobody'S Perfect		Niko von Glasow	2008	Germany

=== Swiss Cinema ===
Swiss Cinema Rediscovered
Original Title	English Title	Director(s)	Year	Production Country
Der 10. Mai	Late 10. May	Franz Schnyder	1957	Switzerland
Mein Persien-Flug 1924-1925	My Persia Flight 1924-1925	Walter Mittelholzer	1925	Switzerland

==== Appellation Swiss ====
Original Title	English Title	Director(s)	Year	Production Country
Auf Der Strecke	On the Line	Reto Caffi	2007	Germany
Bersten	Burst	Michael Finger	2007	Switzerland
Bird's Nest - Herzog & De Meuron In China		Christoph Schaub, Michael Schindhelm	2008	Switzerland
Der Freund	The Friend	Micha Lewinsky	2007	Switzerland
Giorni E Nuvole	Days and Clouds	Silvio Soldini	2007	Italy
Glorious Exit		Kevin Merz	2008	Switzerland
L'Autre Moitié	The Other Half	Rolando Colla	2007	Switzerland
La Mère	The Mother	Antoine Cattin, Pavel Kostomarov	2007	Switzerland
Nomad's Land - Sur Les Traces De Nicolas Bouvier	Nomad's Land - In the Footsteps of Nicolas Bouvier	Gaël Métroz	2008	Switzerland
The Beast Within		Yves Scagliola	2007	Switzerland
Témoin Indésirable	Unwanted Witness	Juan José Lozano	2008	Switzerland

== Official Awards ==
=== International Competition ===
- Golden Leopard: Parque Via directed by Enrique Rivero
- Leopard for Best Actress: Ilaria Occhini in Mar Nero
- Leopard for Best Actor: Tayanc Ayaydin in The Market – A Tale Of Trade
- Best Director: Denis Côté for ELLE VEUT LE CHAOS
- Special Jury Prize: 33 Sceny Z Zycia directed by Małgorzata Szumowska
- Special Mention, International Competition: Liu Mang De Sheng Yan directed by Pan Jianlin, Daytime Drinking directed by NOH Young-Seok

=== Filmmakers of the Present Competition Jury ===
- C.P. Company Golden Leopard/Filmmakers of the Present Competition: La Forteresse directed by Fernand Melgar
- CinéCinéma Special Jury Prize, Filmmakers of the Present Competition: Alicia En El Pais directed by Esteban Larrain
- Special Mention, Filmmakers of the Present Competition: Prince Of Broadway directed by Sean Baker

=== Leopards of Tomorrow Competition ===
- Golden Leopard, IKEA Prize, Swiss Competition, Leopards of Tomorrow: La Délogeuse directed by Julien Rouyet
- Silver Leopard, Eastman Kodak Company Prize, Swiss Competition, Leopards of Tomorrow: Un Dia Y Nada directed by Lorenz Merz
- “Action Light Prize” for the Best Swiss Newcomer: Au Café Romand directed by Richard Szotyori
- Golden Leopard, SRG SSR idée Suisse Prize, International Competition, Leopards of Tomorrow: Dez Elefantes directed by Eva Randolph
- Silver Leopard, Eastman Kodak Company Prize International Competition, Leopards of Tomorrow: Kaupunkilaisia directed by Juho Kuosmanen
- Film and Video Subtitling Prize: Babin directed by Isamu Hirabayashi
- Special Mention, Leopards of Tomorrow: Resolution directed by Pavel Oreshnikov

=== Best First Feature ===
- Leopard for Best First Feature: März directed by Klaus Händl

=== Piazza Grande ===
- Prix du Public UBS: Son Of Rambow
- Variety Piazza Grande Award: Back Soon directed by Sólveig Anspach

=== Youth Jury ===
- First Prize, Youth Jury: Yuriev Den directed by Kirill Serebrennikov
- Second Prize, Youth Jury Prize: 33 Sceny Z Zycia directed by Małgorzata Szumowska
- Third Prize, Youth Jury: Mar Nero directed by Federico Bondi
- “The environnement is the quality of life” Prize: Sleep Furiously directed by Gideon Koppel
- Special Mention, Youth Jury: Elle Veut Le Chaos directed by Denis Côté, Het Zusje Van Katia directed by Mijke de Jong

=== Ecumenical Jury ===
- Oecumenical Jury Prize: Mar Nero directed by Federico Bondi
- Special Mention, Oecumenical Jury: Yuriev Den directed by Kirill Serebrennikov

=== FIPRESCI Jury ===
- FIPRESCI Prize: Parque Via directed by Enrique Rivero

=== CICAE juries-Prix Art & Essai ===
- CICAE Prize: Sonbahar directed by Özcan Alper

=== NETPAC Jury (Network for the Promotion of Asian Cinema) ===
- NETPAC Prize: Daytime Drinking directed by NOH Young-Seok

=== Junior Jury ===
- FICC/IFFS Prize: Yuriev Den directed by Kirill Serebrennikov

=== SRG SSR idée suisse | Semaine de la critique Prize ===
- Critics Week: Latawce directed by Beata Dzianowicz

=== Prize “Cinema e Gioventù” – Leopards of Tomorrow ===
- Special Mention, Swiss Competition: Im Wendekreis Des Bären directed by Ciril Braem
- Youth Jury Prize, International Competition – Leopards of Tomorrow (Short Films): Babin directed by Isamu Hirabayashi
- Special Mention, Youth Jury, International Competition, Leopards of Tomorrow (Short Films): Ciobanul Zburator directed by Catalin Musat
- Special Mention, Youth Jury, Swiss Competition, Leopards of Tomorrow (Short Films): La Délogeuse directed by Julien Rouyet
