= Femicide in Mexico =

Murders of women

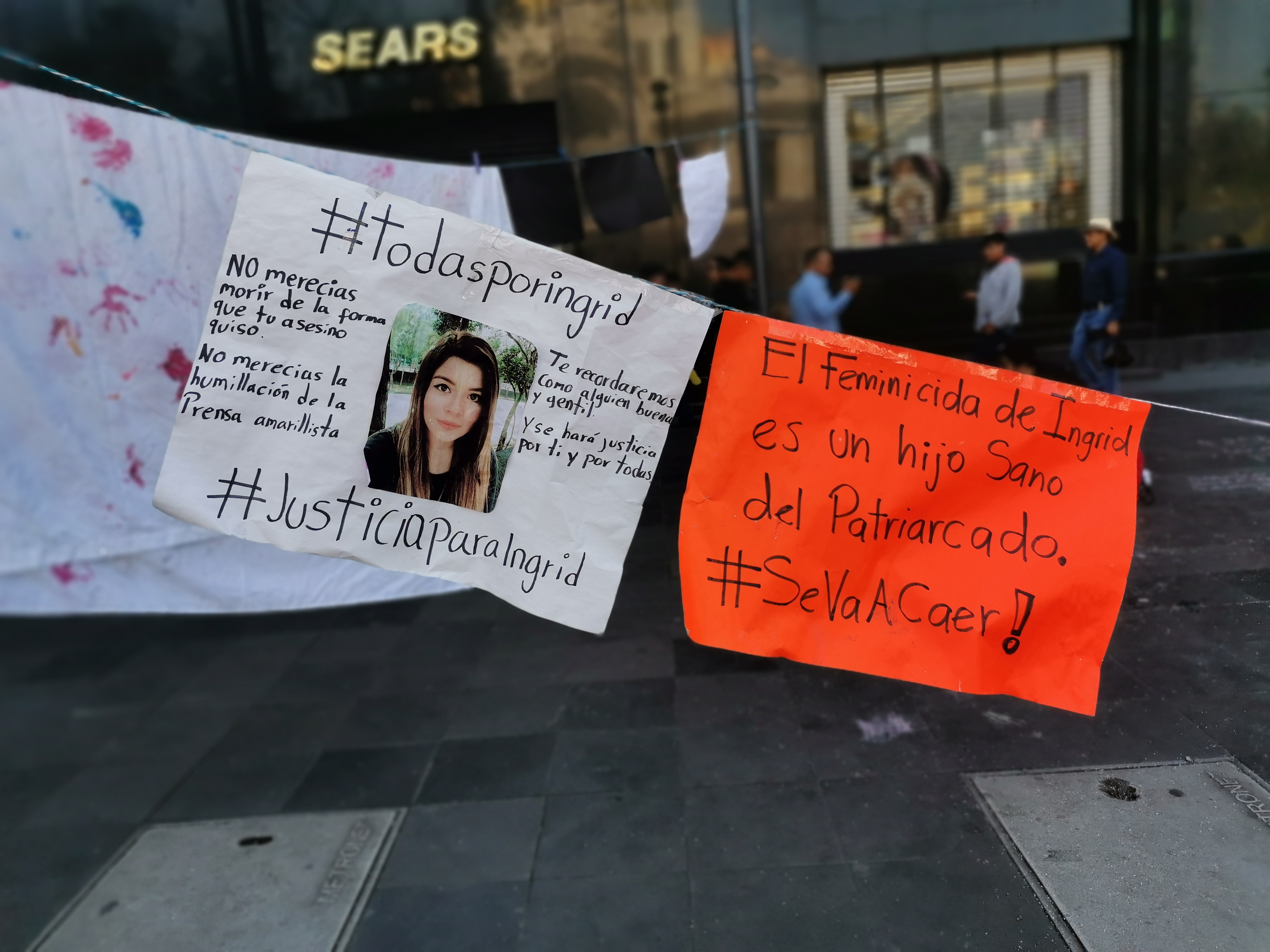
Protest signs against femicide in Mexico

Mexico has the highest femicide rates in Latin America, with as many as 3% of murder victims classified as femicides. In 2021, there were approximately 1,000 femicides, out of 34,000 total murder victims. Ciudad Juárez, in Chihuahua, has one of the highest rates of femicide in the country. As of 2023, Colima State has the highest femicide rate, with over 4 out of every 100,000 women murdered because of their gender. Morelos and Campeche had the subsequent highest femicide rates in 2023.

Mexico has one of the world's highest overall murder rates, and 90% of victims are men. An escalation of violence began in the early 1990s, and was followed by a wave of sexual violence and torture, abductions, and increasing rates of women being murdered because of their gender. While the number of women murdered in Mexico has grown substantially in recent years, the proportion of female victims of homicide has stayed constant over the last three decades. According to the INEGI (Instituto Nacional de Estadística y Geografía), the ratio of homicides targeting women were between 10% and 13% between 1990 and 2020.

Up to a third of female murder victims in Mexico are murdered by their current or ex-partners. This violence has been attributed to the backlash theory, which alleges that as a marginalized group gains more rights in society, there is a violent backlash from their oppressors. Notably, Indigenous women—who make up 15% of the population—are at a higher risk of gender-based violence, like femicide, due to economic marginalization and limited access to health and government protections. Additionally, more geographic isolation and gender inequality results in less effective intervention and victim support.

The response from the Mexican government has been minimal. Currently there is very little legislation protecting women. This lack of response further discourages individuals or groups from speaking out or challenging this phenomenon. There have been many small feminist movements that have attempted to bring attention to the level of violence Mexican women face. These movements primarily focus their efforts on demonstrations, sharing their own experiences, and creating works of art to express their frustrations.

Recently, transfeminists Sayak Valencia and Liliana Falcón, alongside existing local feminist movements like "Ni Una Menos", have sought to include transgender women as legitimate victims of femicide. They use the terms transfemicide or transfeminicide as particular forms of femicide targeting transgender people. Feminist theorist and philosopher Judith Butler notes that the rallying slogan "Ni Una Menos" is based on a diverse coalition of people against the killing of all feminized subjects, including cisgender women, trans women, and travestis.

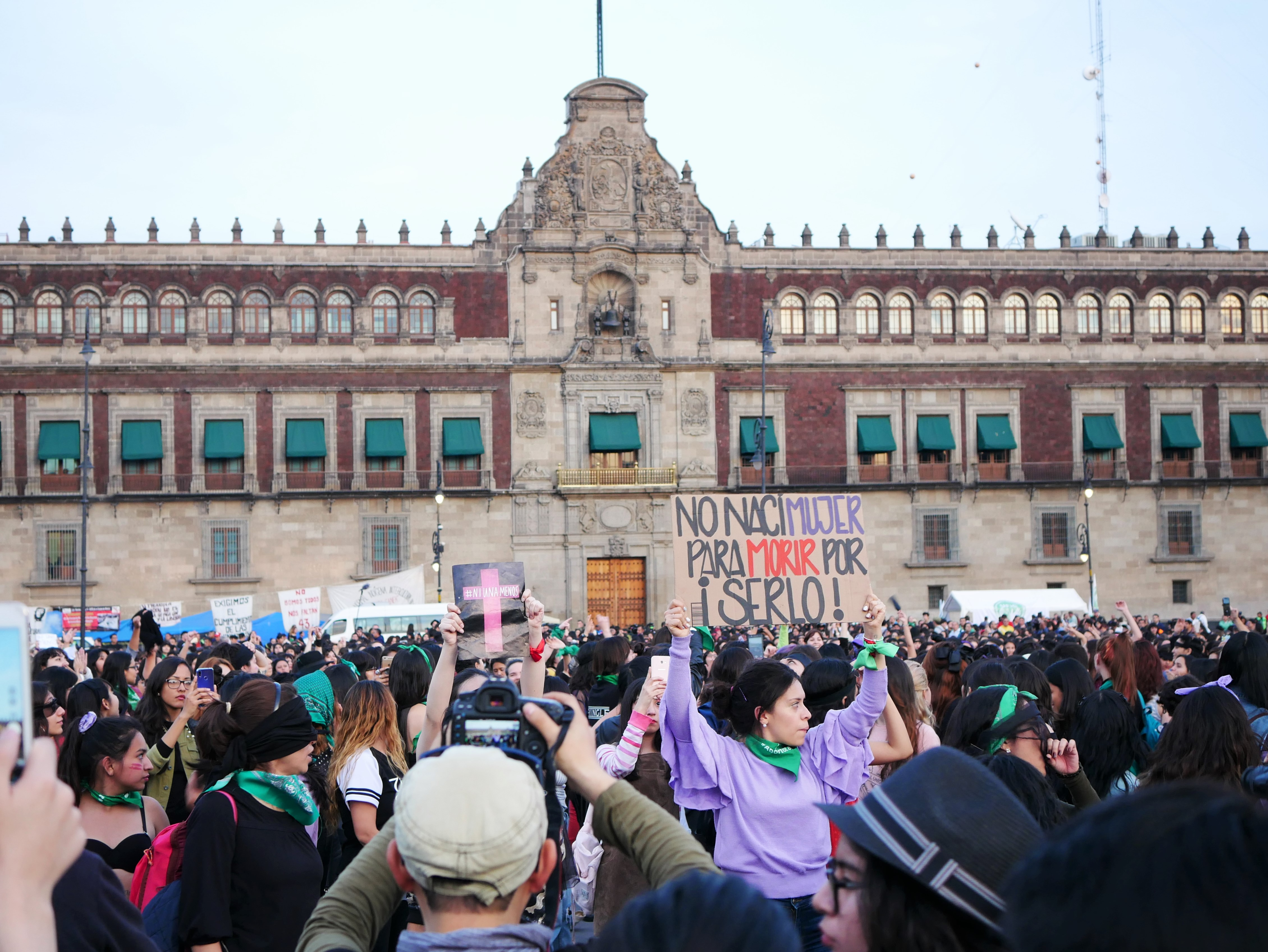
Protestors in Mexico

Mexico officially began documenting femicide cases in 2012. In 2021, roughly 3% of murder victims (~1,000 out of 34,000 total) were classed as femicides. On average, ten girls and women and one hundred boys and men are killed each day in Mexico. It is estimated that three femicides occur daily.[1] The country’s high murder rate continues to make international headlines, drawing attention to the Mexican authorities' lack in deterring crime and violence.

== Timeline of Femicides in Mexico ==
=== 2016 ===
==== Paola Buenrostro ====
Paola Buenrostro, a trans sex worker, was killed in the Colonial Tabacalera neighborhood of Mexico City by one of her clients. The perpetrator was arrested and subsequently released by a judge, who cited a lack of evidence. In 2024, after years of lobbying from activists, Mexico City passed the "Paola Buenrostro Law", enshrining transfemicide as a crime punishable by a prison sentence of up to 70 years.

=== 2020 ===
In 2020, femicides increased significantly. During the first seven months of the year, reports indicated that approximately 2,000 femicides had occurred. Mexico is considered one of the countries with the highest number of femicides in Latin America and globally. Among the most dangerous regions is the State of Mexico—particularly the municipality of Ecatepec—where 84 murders were reported in the early months of the year.

==== Ingrid Escamilla ====
One case that drew controversy in 2020 was that of Ingrid Escamilla, a Mexican woman who was murdered by her partner in her apartment. Police leaked images of the crime scene to the press, which were published in various newspapers. In response, demonstrations were held in the Zócalo de la Ciudad de México, especially on February 14. The case led to the proposal of the Ingrid law, which criminalizes sharing images, audios, or videos of corpses or body parts, of the circumstances of death, injuries or state of health. Higher penalties are invoked If the content relates to women, girls, or adolescents, or if the content is leaked by a public servant.

=== 2021 ===
==== Debanhi Escobar ====
Debanhi Susana Escobar Bazaldúa, 18, disappeared after attending a party with friends in Monterrey, Nuevo León, Mexico on April 9, 2021. Her body was found 13 days later in a nearby motel cistern. The case generated great social commotion due to irregularities in the investigation and the lack of answers from the authorities.

=== 2022 ===
==== Lidia Gabriela ====
Lidia Gabriela Gomez, 35, was kidnapped by a cab driver in Mexico City, Mexico on November 19, 2022, and later found dead. The case generated outrage over the alleged complicity of the authorities, who failed to respond in time to the victim's distress calls.

=== 2026 ===
==== Claudia Tacoronte ====
Claudia Tacoronte Aguilera, a 21-year-old Spanish exchange student from Gran Canaria, was fatally stabbed in Cuautla, Morelos on 12 September 2026.

== Risk factors and roadblocks ==
Violence against women, that is, violence specifically against women and girls by men and boys on the basis of the victim's gender, is the result of misogyny and sexist discrimination. In Mexico the misogynistic ideology is known as machismo. Feminist movements have been active in bringing attention to the problem of femicide, but the rates still continue to climb, especially among indigenous women. One hypothesis posited for the rate of growth in femicides is that as Mexican women gained more autonomy within patriarchal society, men who hold misogynist beliefs respond violently in an effort to maintain their own social power.

While femicide and gender based violence are issues that impact all women, some factors put certain groups of women at higher risk of violence. Low-income women and indigenous women in particular are more likely to be victims of femicide than their wealthier peers. For indigenous women, geography is a problem, as offices to report these instances are not located near indigenous communities. This leads to under-reporting, making it more challenging to quantify the level of violence against these women.

Other roadblocks to quantifying the violence Mexican women experience is a general misunderstanding of what femicide is. Many people view femicide as simply murder, rather than a targeted attack on the basis of gender. This conflation of femicide with other kinds of violence erases the gendered aspect and motivations specific to femicide.

=== Women at increased risk ===
Out of all women groups, Indigenous women in Mexico are at a higher risk of being victims of gender-based violence, as well as an overlooked group in terms of seeking justice. Indigenous women, despite comprising 15% of Mexico's population are overlooked in the discussion of femicide because of the factors that place them at a higher risk. 80% of Indigenous peoples in Mexico live below the poverty line, in states like Chiapas and Oaxaca, the southernmost region of Mexico where most of the Indigenous populations live. The indigenous community in Mexico face a range of issues like discrimination and a lack of social and health provisions, but all issues specifically affect indigenous women the most. In this range of issues, indigenous women are also at a higher risk of facing sexual abuse as children and adolescents.

In Mexico, human trafficking is a byproduct of the cartels, and factors like a history of sexual violence and low socio-economic development increase the risk of being a trafficking victim. For indigenous women, they make up 70% of the human trafficking victims from Mexican cartels. Additionally, targeting the economic vulnerability of indigenous women have caused maquiladoras, clothing factories, to spread across Mexican cities. These maquiladoras pay low wages to the workers, and are often in cartel trafficking hot spots. This combination of economic vulnerability near cartels has resulted in an increased rate of indigenous women facing death, rape, trafficking, and other forms of gender violence. The government of Mexico has ultimately failed to create effective preventative measures and social structures that would deter gender based violence.

The Ingrid Escamilla case is an example of this, as mutilated pictures of the 25 year old's body were published in tabloids. Former President Manuel López Obrador stated in a conference he did not want to discuss feminicide because it would distract from the raffle the government was holding, ultimately placing profit over security concerns. Society has not failed to protest the government's lack of action, causing the National Autonomous University of Mexico to shut down from protests accusing staff members of harassment and sexual violence. This is only a continuance of the 137% increase of gender based violence in Mexico from the last five years, as when the former President Felipe Calderón Hinojosa (2006–2012) declared a war on drugs, a notable spike in femicides was noticed in the Chiapas, Jalisco, Nuevo León, Veracruz, and many more states.

== Feminist movements ==
The rise of violence in Mexico has also seen a public softening towards the concept of feminism, especially among those fighting for justice for femicide victims. Mexican women began to take to the streets to march in large demonstrations. These marches called for the acknowledgement of the gender based violence women face. Mexican feminists created the term "feminicidio" (femicide) to describe the way some women are murdered because they are women. They urged their community members to recognize this kind of violence deviates from other kinds of murder and see it as a different issue. The main participants in this movement are the loved ones of those who have been victims of femicide. Their loved ones use various forms of media to spread the stories of those who lost their lives in the violence. Their efforts birthed many organizations that act to keep women in Mexico safe from violence as well as informed about it.

Social media and the #MeToo movement transformed the movement through changing the culture of shame and fear that came with coming forward about sexual violence. Women naming their abusers publicly became normalized as a result.

== Police response ==
The response to the increase in violence from both the local police and Mexican government has been consistently inadequate. Police officers are known to downplay instances of women going missing and to be slow to respond to reports of violence or missing people. These sluggish responses result in death as time is of the essence in disappearance cases. Additionally, actual investigations are often not conducted properly which compromises their integrity, ultimately making it more difficult for victims to get justice. Crime scenes do not get sealed, autopsies are mishandled, and victims are not identified. In the case of prosecution, people are tortured into giving false confessions to take accountability for more murders than they are responsible for. Falsification of evidence also contributes to innocent people being arrested. In many places in Mexico, police officers themselves have been found to be linked to the murders. Furthermore, victims are frequently blamed for their deaths and families' perspectives of their deceased loved ones are treated with skepticism.

Some have suggested that the Mexican government allows femicides and other kinds of gender based violence to occur because it makes women afraid, and may prevent feminist movements or further liberation for Mexican women. When women are more focused on fearing for their lives, activist circles are more difficult to sustain.

Activists in Mexico as well as other human rights organizations have criticized the Mexican government for its conduct and claimed these actions are human rights violations. The Police response along with activists' critiques has led to rallies and protests around police stations in order to garner support and further raise awareness.

== Law and national protocols ==
Following the disappearance of Mónica Citlalli Díaz in a suburb of Mexico City in November 2022, Supreme Court President Arturo Zaldívar enacted a national protocol to investigate all femicides, as well as other homicides targeted towards women. Efforts have been previously made by certain Mexican states to create prosecutor's offices specifically for gender-based crimes. Since 2015, the federal government has declared multiple gender violence alerts to urge local, state and federal authorities to take the necessary emergency action in particular regions, and to provide the public with vital security measures and justice for victims and affected communities.

=== Feminicide in the penal codes of Mexican states ===
NO.	Federal Entity	Date of publication	Typical figure	Bien jurídico tutelado
1.	Aguascalientes Article 97A	August 21, 2017 amended on June 11, 2018. amended on DECEMBER 23, 2019.	Autonomous figure	Life
2.	Baja California Article 129	April 5, 2013 reformed on March 20, 2015. reformed March 24, 2021	Baja California Autonomous figure	Life
3.	Baja California Sur Article 389	Approved on November 29, 2013. Vetoed by the Governor of the State on January 28, 2014, voted by the Congress in February 2014 and published on November 30, 2014.	Homicide offender	No
4.	Campeche Article 160	July 20, 2012 reformed on March 10, 2013.	Campeche Autonomous figure	Life
5.	Chiapas Article 164 Bis	February 8, 2012.	Chiapas Autonomous figure	Life
6.	Chihuahua Article 126 Bis	September 14, 2017	Self-governing figure	Life
7.	Coahuila Article 336 Bis 1	October 24, 2012 reformed on September 15, 2015.	Coahuila Article 336 Bis 1	Life
8.	Colima Article 191 Bis 5	August 27, 2011 reformed on July 4, 2015.	Colima Autonomous figure	Life
9.	Mexico City Article 148 bis	July 26, 2011.	Autonomous figure	Life, bodily integrity, dignity and access to a life free of violence.

=== General law on women's access to a life free from violence ===
The Women's Access Law defines femicide violence as: "The extreme form of gender violence against women, product of the violation of their human rights, in the public and private spheres, formed by the set of misogynist behaviors that can lead to social and State impunity and can culminate in homicide and other forms of violent death of women.

In cases of femicide, the penalties set forth in Article 325 of the Federal Criminal Code will be applied."

And it establishes the gender violence alert: "It is the set of emergency governmental actions to confront and eradicate feminicidal violence in a given territory, whether exercised by individuals or by the community itself." and has been considered as a defense mechanism.

It is activated to alert people belonging to governmental bodies and the population in general about the urgency of stopping femicides, street, work, school or domestic harassment, discrimination and violence experienced by Mexican women, with the purpose of guaranteeing a good quality of life free of inequalities.

==== Alerta de Violencia de Género contra las Mujeres ====
The Alerta de Violencia de Género contra las Mujeres is a mechanism of the government of Mexico that aims to "confront and eradicate femicidal violence in a given territory". It encompasses various actions, including protocols for the investigation of femicides and programs aimed at feticide prevention, as well as "reforms to eliminate inequality in legislation and public policy".

== Activism ==
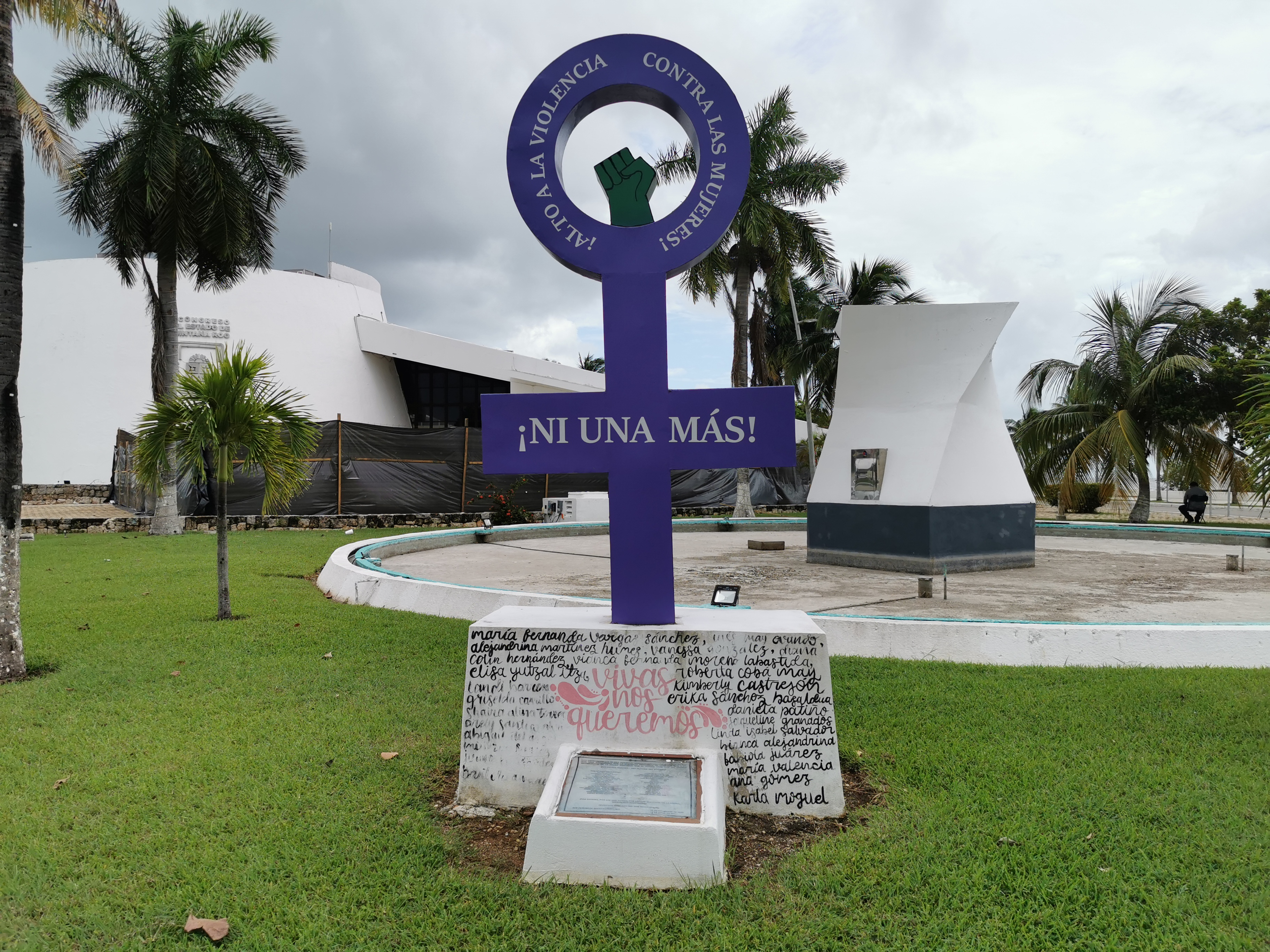
An Antimonumenta in Chetumal, Quintana Roo

=== Art ===
The denunciation of femicide has been present since the early 2000s in the work of numerous artists. Activists and artists have joined to denounce the murder of women as reported by the artist and feminist theorist Monica Mayer. The first exhibitions denouncing feminicide were carried out by Chicana artists in the United States in collaboration with Mexican artists, according to Mayer. In addition to exhibitions they carry out marches to Ciudad Juarez to denounce the situation. In 2000, Maritza Morillas painted "Paisaje cotidiano en Ciudad Juárez". When she was invited by Yan María Castro to participate in an exhibition against violence against women, she created the series "CAroDAtaVERnibus" (2001) dedicated to the women murdered in Ciudad Juárez.

In 2002, Claudia Bernal organized a performance in the Zócalo to denounce violence against women. Lorena Wolffer's work Mientras dormíamos: el caso Juárez, Guatemalan Regina José Galindo's 1999 work El dolor en un pañuelo and 2005 work Perra, also deal with gender violence and femicide.

New York City-based artist Coco Fuscó and hactivist artist Ricardo Domínguez collaborated on the performance piece Dolores from 10 to 10 (2002), which denounces the situation of women in the maquilas and the violence they face. In 2003, María Ezcurra unveiled the sculpture "Ni una más". That same year, the MujerArte AC (2002–2006) collective, led by Yan María Castro, convened the First Meeting on Feminicide through the Arts. In 2005, the collective La Ira del Silencio, led by Ana María Iturbe presented "Feminicidios, en el país de no pasa nada"

In 2017, the Museo Memoria y Tolerancia in Mexico City presented the temporary exhibition "Feminicidio en México. Enough is enough! curated by Linda Atachd. It included works by Teresa Margolles, Mayra Martell, Iván Castaneira, Cintia Bolio, Teresa Serrano and Elina Chauvet which were made in the last decade.

=== Antimonumenta ===
Antimonumenta are art pieces erected at protests to demand justice for the victims of gender violence and femicides in different states of Mexico such as the CDMX, the State of Mexico, Jalisco, Quintana Roo and Chiapas.

=== Soccer ===
On October 28, 2017, the Los de Arriba supporters' club Los de Arriba displayed a hundred posters with the legend "Ni una menos" (Not one less), at the match played between León and Veracruz. In addition, a statement was published on social networks, denouncing violence against women.

== See also ==
- Violence against women in Mexico
