= Kevin Kaarl =

Mexican folk singer and composer

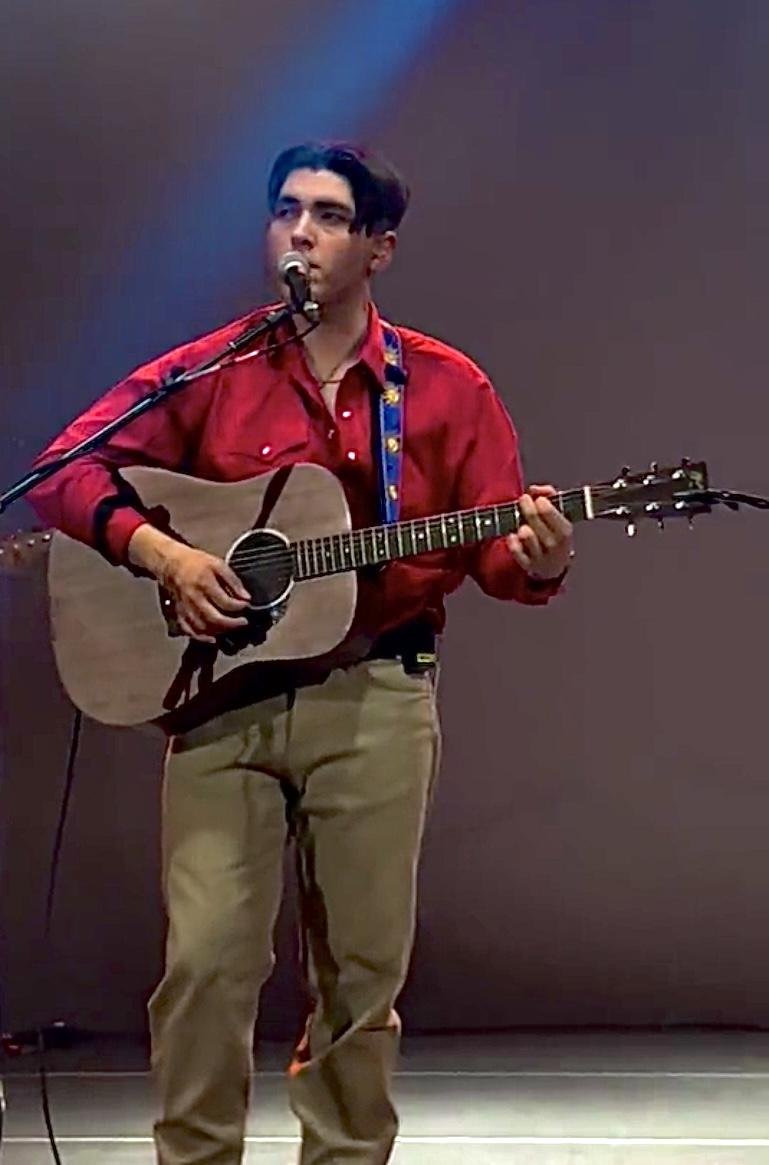
- Kevin in a live performance in 2022
- Born: Kevin Eduardo Hernández Carlos; May 15, 2000 (age 26); Meoqui, Chihuahua
- Occupations: Musician; singer; composer
- Years active: 2018–present

Signature
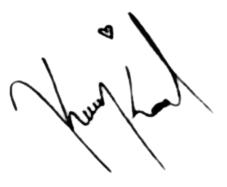

Kevin Eduardo Hernández Carlos (born May 15, 2000), known artistically as Kevin Kaarl is a Mexican folk singer and composer. He released his first single "Amor viejo" on September 18, 2018, and began to capture the public's attention, with more than 7 million views on YouTube. That December, he rose to fame with the release of his "Vámonos a marte" single that reached more than 23 million views on YouTube and 104 million on Spotify. It achieved success thanks to social media virality.

In his childhood and adolescence, Kaarl participated in different choirs and musical bands. At the age of 7, he joined a youth band in Meoqui, Chihuahua. In elementary school, he joined the school choir, and years later he joined another band in his hometown. In 2014 he stopped playing the guitar and singing to start a photography and film project. Before starting his musical project, Kaarl played guitar, while his twin brother Bryan, who plays the trumpet, sang backup vocals during their live performances.

Kaarl was studying communication due to his interest in photography, cinema and journalism before dedicating himself completely to music. Among his musical influences are Norteño, classical music and rock music, however, the main genres that make up his discography include folk, indie and alternative. On November 27, 2020, he released the music video for the song "Es que yo te Quiero a ti" as a show of support for the women victims of feminicide. In 2023, Billboard magazine recognized him as one of the 23 Latin artists who had the most impact on music that year.

Kaarl has two studio albums: Hasta el fin del mundo (2019) and París, Texas (2022), in addition to one EP, San Lucas (2019). Among his most popular songs are songs such as; "San Lucas", "Vámonos a marte" ("Let's go to Mars"), "Colapso" ("Collapse"), "Es que yo te quiero a ti" ("It's just that I love you"), "Si supieras" ("If you only knew"), "Toda esta ciudad" ("This whole city"), "Amor viejo" ("Old love"), "Abrazado a ti" ("Hugging you"), "Mujer distante" ("Distant Woman"), "Tu si eres real" ("You're real"), "Cómo me encanta" ("How I love it"). Several of them have entered the Top 10 in different countries; Vámonos a mars reached the number one position on the Top 40 Charts in Chile, "San Lucas" also reached number one on the YouTube Top 100 Songs charts in Mexico.

In addition to singing in Spanish, he also sings in English and has composed songs such as "Next to you", "Good times", and "Selfish pretty girl", among others. He has also collaborated with artists such as Leon Bridges, and León Marinero, Daniel Quién and Pablo Díaz-Reixa.

He has gained international popularity by performing outside of Mexico, in countries such as the United States, and in Europe, including Spain and Germany, as well as in countries in South America, such as Argentina, Paraguay, Chile, Colombia, Peru and Ecuador. He has also played at music festivals such as Vive Latino, the Pal Norte and the Primavera Sound.

== Biography and artistic career ==
=== 2001–2018: Beginnings ===
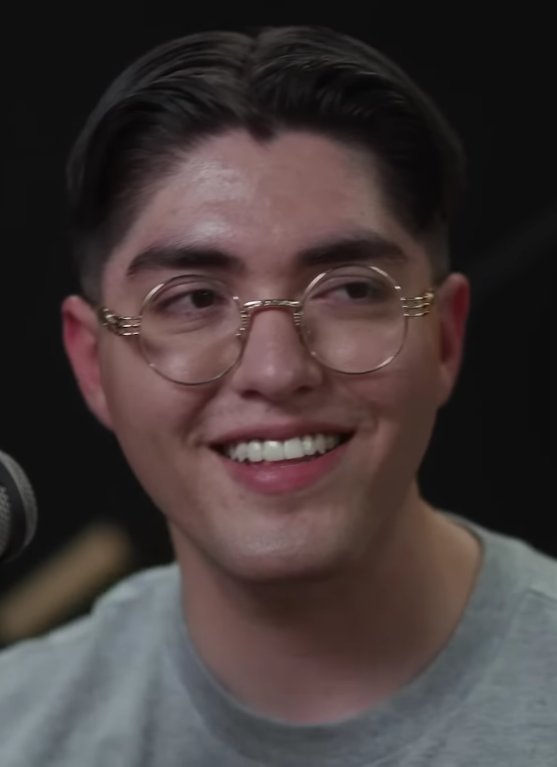
Kevin (left) and Bryan Kaarl (right) are twins.

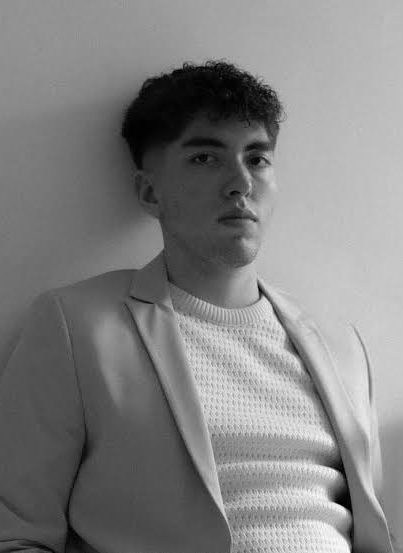

Kevin expressed a strong interest in music from an early age, participating in different school musical bands. In an interview with Ricardo O'Farrill he mentioned that he was also in norteño music groups during his childhood and adolescence with his twin brother Bryan. thus learning to play different instruments, including the guitar and the trumpet.

As he grew up, he leaned more towards the guitar and, he says, he started writing songs out of boredom in his room as a hobby he decided to upload them to his YouTube channel and unexpectedly began to gain many views, which made him focus more on this independent musical project. Before this project, Kaarl was interested in starting a photography project.

In 2018, together with his twin brother, Bryan Kaarl, who serves as a trumpet player and provides secondary vocals, he began the musical project Kevin Kaarl, releasing their first song, "Amor viejo", on YouTube, which exceeded 19 million views. Some time later he would add his songs to digital platforms such as Spotify and Apple Music.

=== 2019–2021: HEFDM and San Lucas ===
On February 28, 2019, his debut album, Hasta el fin del mundo, was released. It included singles such as, "Si supieras" ("If you knew"), "Vámonos a marte" and "Colapso", surpassing 100 million views on digital platforms. Later that same year, on November 7, he released an EP titled San Lucas, from which his best-known singles are "San Lucas" and "Abrazado a ti". He also released different songs, such as "Next to you", a single he sings in English, "Quédate" and "Más y más", in a collaboration with Sebastián Romero.

In 2020, he released the single "Es que yo te Quiero a ti", during the COVID-19 pandemic. In the clip for this single, Kevin promoted the non-profit organization Justicia para nuestras hijas ("Justice for our daughters") and portrayed the pain suffered by families of victims of femicide in Mexico.

In 2021, Kevin only released two more works, "Por ti me quedo en San Luis", along with singer Un León Marinero and "Toda esta ciudad". In addition, he worked Mexican musician Daniel Quién's album Aroma a nostalgia on the song "Dime que siempre vamos a estar juntos" ("Tell me that we are always going to be together"). That same year, it was announced that he would be part of the list of artists at the Vive Latino 2022 festival.

=== 2022-present: París, Texas ===
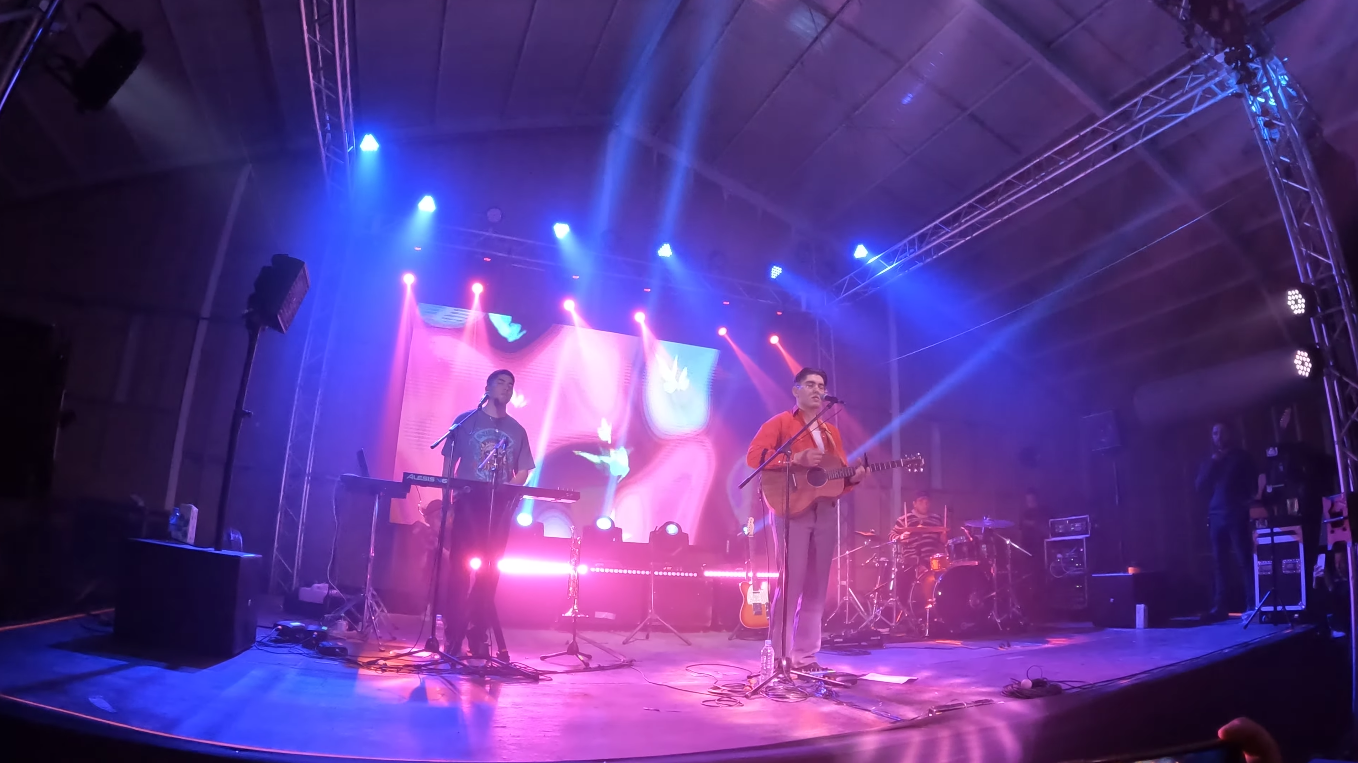
Kevin Kaarl on París, Texas tour, in Quito, Ecuador.

On June 14, 2021, Kevin announced that he was working on a new album, however, it was not until July 28, 2022, that he announced the release date of August 25, 2022, when he released his second studio album, Paris Texas.

On June 2 the music video of "Como me encanta" was released on YouTube as the single that would open the new album. Paris Texas was inspired by the film Paris, Texas. The album is made up of 13 songs including singles like "Como me encanta" ("How I Love It.") The most listened to songs were "Te quiero tanto" ("I love you so much"), "Siente más" ("Feel more"), "Llora más" ("Cry more") and "Nunca te supe cuidar" ("I never knew how to take care of you").

Most of the songs on Paris Texas were written and produced by Kaarl, however songs such as "Cuéntame una historia de rencor" was made in collaboration with the Spanish singer El Guincho. Likewise, the American producer Chris Coadi participated in songs like "¿Por qué no me comprendes?" ("Why don't you understand me?") and "Nunca te supe cuidar" ("I never knew how to take care of you.") That same year, in 2022, he announced his first international tour where he performed in American cities such as Los Angeles, Las Vegas, Houston, New York City and Chicago, in Europe in countries such as Spain and Germany, as well as Latin America and Mexico.

== Philanthropy and activism ==
=== Justicia para nuestras hijas ===
In November 2020, he published his single "Es que yo te Quiero a ti". At the end of that month he released a music video, which points out the violence against women, feminicide and forced disappearance of women in Mexico. The video shows a mother trying to look for her daughter, raising awareness of the social problem taking on greater seriousness for young people. Regarding the song, Kaarl commented: "The meaning of 'Es que yo te quiero a ti' is very strong because it reflects the fear, helplessness, sadness and anger that people feel when a loved one is taken away from them." The song refers to the search for people who did not return home, as well as sentimental and personal themes. The original idea of making the video with this theme was proposed by Bruno Gaeta and Renata Rojas, directors of the video. In addition, the money raised from viewings of "Es que yo te quiero a ti" went to the Mexican non-governmental organization "Justicia para nuestras hijas" ("Justice for Our Daughters").

== Musical style and influences ==
Kevin Kaarl mixes folk and alternative indie in most of his songs, whether in Spanish or English. In the collaboration he has done with Un León Marinero in "Por ti yo me quedo en San Luis" he has not changed his type of style, since both share the same musical vibe, thus interpreting a folk song.

Among his musical influences, Kaarl says that when he starts a song he does not have a base of inspiration from a specific artist but, when listening to different songs from different artists and bands, he mixes bases of songs that he has heard to, finally, be able to get inspired. and have a solid foundation for his songs.

"Mi estilo de música va basado mucho en las experiencias que he vivido y el cómo las he vivido, toda la mezcla de sentimientos que se me cruzaron en el momento y también un poco sobre mi perspectiva de la vida. Entonces al momento de escribir una canción intento describirlo con mi voz y mi guitarra."

"My style of music is based a lot on the experiences I have lived and how I have lived them, the whole mix of feelings that crossed my mind at the time and also a little on my perspective on life. So when I write a song I try to describe it with my voice and my guitar."

In an interview for Diario Querétaro.

For the first time, he and his brother Bryan performed covers of singers like Christian Nodal, Chalino Sánchez, and typical songs from Norteño music. For the album Paris, Texas, Kaarl included new musical genres such as pop, alternative music and dream pop. The American band The Lumineers also served as inspiration for the EP, San Lucas to which has a touch of música campirana style, incorporating Mexican folkloric music combined with country music. Other artists that inspire Kevin are David Bowie and Beach House making reference to them on his album Paris, Texas. The song "Como me encanta" ("How I Love It") has chords similar to "Heroes".

== Other projects ==
=== Work in photography and film ===
In 2018, during his studies in communication sciences, he began directing music videos, directing an alternative music video of the single "Fuentes de Ortiz" by the singer Ed Maverick, which was released that same year. Finally, the video clip was removed by Kevin's own decision, due to disagreements with Ed.

Later, upon moving to Chihuahua, Kaarl began composing his own music with songs like "Baby blue" or "Amor viejo" ("Old love"), at the same time he was studying. He started making some music videos and photographs with the help of his friends, and with his older brother's old Lumix camera. On September 18, 2018, he published his first lyrical video for the song "Amor Viejo" reaching more than 33 million views on YouTube.

== Personal life ==
=== Relationships ===
Since 2020, Kaarl has been in a relationship with lawyer Ashley Loya, who also acts in different music videos, such as "San Lucas" and "Te quiero tanto".

=== Health ===
In an interview for Roberto Martínez, in his podcast Creativo, Kaarl mentioned that during the COVID-19 pandemic he suffered from anxiety and depression which led him to feel disoriented, lose his personality and decide to shave his head. His manager took the initiative to take him to therapy with a psychologist to try to resolve the problems that Kaarl was going through. In the interview he also commented that he felt harassed because of the fame he was obtaining due to his multiple musical successes.

== Discography ==
=== Studio albums ===
- 2019: Hasta el fin del mundo
- 2022: París, Texas
- 2025: Ultra sodade

=== EPs ===
- 2019: San Lucas

== Tours ==
=== Main tours ===
- 2019: San Lucas Tour
- 2022: París, Texas Tour
- 2025: ‘’Ultra Sodade Tour’’

== Videography ==
=== Music videos ===
Lista de videos musicales de Kevin Kaarl
Year	Song	Other Artist(s)	Album
2018	«Amor viejo» (Note: The music video of «Amor Viejo», released only lyrically, reached more than 33 million views)	Inactive	Inactive
2018	«Vámonos a marte» (Note: The music video of «Vamanos a marte», released only lyrically, reached more than 27 million views)	Inactive	Hasta el fin del mundo
2019	«Colapso» (Note: The video clip of «Colapso», released only lyrically, reached more than 116 million views)	Inactive	Hasta el fin del mundo
2019	«Mujer distante»	Inactive	Hasta el fin del mundo
2020	«San Lucas»	Inactive	San Lucas
2020	«Es que yo te quiero a ti» (Note: Two music videos for "Es que yo te Quiero a Ti" were released, one lyrical that reached more than 30 million views.)	Inactive	Inactive
2022	«Toda esta ciudad» (Note: Two video clips of "Toda esta ciudad" were released, one lyrical one that reached more than 29 million views.)	Inactive	Inactive
2022	«Como me encanta»	Inactive	París, Texas
2022	«Siente más»	Inactive	París, Texas
2023	«Te quiero tanto»	Inactive	París, Texas
