= Adelina von Fürstenberg =

Swiss curator

Countess Adelina von Fürstenberg-Herdringen (née Cüberyan) is a Swiss curator specialized in contemporary art. Von Fürstenberg was one of the first curators to show an interest in non-European artists, thus opening the way for a multicultural approach in art. She also took a more global and flexible approach to contemporary art exhibitions, in bringing art into spaces such as monasteries, madrasas, large public buildings, squares, islands, and parks. Her objective is to give a larger context for visual art in making it a more vigorous part of our lives, in creating a more vivid dialogue for it with other arts, and relating it more to worldwide social issues.

== Biography ==
A Swiss citizen of Armenian origin — granddaughter of the Armenian architect Dikran Kalfa Cüberyan — she was born in Istanbul. She married when she was still at university, to the photographer Count Franz Egon von Fürstenberg-Herdringen (b. 1939), son of Gloria Guinness (1913-1980) and Count Franz-Egon von Fürstenberg-Herdringen (1896-1975).

During her studies of political science at the University of Geneva, Switzerland, Adelina von Fürstenberg founded in 1974 the Centre d'Art Contemporain Genève, which she directed until 1989, presenting several solo shows of the pioneers of pop art, Fluxus, conceptual art, and minimal art, such as Christian Boltanski, Dan Graham, Vito Acconci, Joseph Kosuth, Daniel Buren, Sol LeWitt, Cindy Sherman, Andy Warhol, and Lawrence Weiner. In the same period she organized performances with John Cage, Laurie Anderson, Philip Glass, Joan Jonas, Alvin Lucier, Lucinda Childs, Trisha Brown, Marina Abramović, Charlemagne Palestine, Terry Riley, and Robert Wilson, as well as many group exhibitions, among them the well known open-air exhibition Promenades (1985), on the Lake Leman shores at Parc Lullin, Genthod with sculptures, and site-specific art installations with the Arte Povera artists.

In 1989, she organized the International Labour Organization (ILO) where she presented The Line of Fire, a model by the American architect Daniel Libeskind, scale 1/1, that later became the Jewish Museum Berlin.

From 1989 to 1994, she directed Le Magasin, Centre d’Art Contemporain of Grenoble, France, where she curated the solo exhibitions of Gino De Dominicis and Alighiero Boetti, and directed the École du Magasin (school for curators). In 1993, for the 45th Venice Biennale, she co-curated the Italian Pavilion and the Russian Pavilion (Ilya Kabakov). She also curated the exhibition Trésors du Voyage on the island of San Lazzaro. On this occasion, the international Jury of the Biennale awarded her a prize for her direction of Le Magasin and her work at the École du Magasin.

In 1995, on the occasion of the United Nations' 50th anniversary, she was invited to conceive and curate the exhibition Dialogues of Peace, an international exhibition presented at the UN Headquarters in Geneva. Chen Zhen, Tadashi Kawamata, and Alfredo Jaar were some of the 60 artists from various continents who contributed to the exhibition.

In 1996, she founded Art for the World, a non-governmental organization (NGO) associated to the UN Department of Public Information for the diffusion and promotion of the principles of the Universal Declaration of Human Rights through the organization of exhibitions and events around the world.

Adelina von Fürstenberg has curated with Art for the World, at the occasion of the Venice Biennale at the Armenian Monastery of San Lazzaro, solo shows of Robert Rauschenberg (1997), Jannis Kounellis (2003) and Joseph Kosuth (2007) and in Palazzo Zenobio the Children Museum of the architect Philip Johnson. Since 2005, with ART for The World Europa, in Milan, she has worked with Hangar Bicocca, in creating a series of shows, among them the world avant-première Balkan Epic by Marina Abramović (2006).

Since 1998, she has worked in partnership with the Regional Direction of SESC São Paulo, Brazil, in curating large exhibitions, among them The Overexcited Body. Art and Sport in Contemporary Art, Voom Portraits by Robert Wilson (2008), and, in 2010, Urban Manners 2 on Indian contemporary art, for the first time in South America.

Between 2011-2013, Von Fürstenberg curated The Mediterranean Approach, an itinerant exhibition under the auspices of the Cultural Council of the Union pour la Méditerranée (UPM), Marseille Provence 2013, Cultural Capital of Europe and the City of Geneva. Aiming to emphasize differences as well as similarities as part of the underlying deep identity connecting all Mediterranean peoples, the exhibition was presented in avant première during the 54. Biennale of Venice, at Palazzo Zenobio (June–August, 2011), in Marseille at the mac - Museum of Contemporary Art (February–May, 2012) and at SESC Pinheiros in São Paulo (October 2012-January 2013) in collaboration with the Regional Direction of SESC São Paulo.

In December 2012, she curated FOOD, a large art project on Mother Earth, agriculture and nutrition, inviting artists to explore the fascinating question of food, a highly complex issue, simultaneously dealing with survival, health, economy and culture. Under the auspicies of EXPO Milan 2015 and in partnership with the Department of Culture of Geneva, the world première opening was in Geneva on December 18, 2012 in the large temporary exhibitions spaces of the Musée Ariana, located next to the UN Headquarters. Between March 2014 and June 2014, São Paulo hosted a new version of FOOD at SESC Belezinho and between October 2014 to February 2015, the 3rd venue of FOOD has taken place at MuCEM (Musée des Civilisations et de la Méditerranée).

Among her most recent curatorships are ICI l’AFRIQUE at the Château de Penthes, Geneva (May–July 2014), and AQUIAFRICA the SESC Belenzhino, São Paulo (November 2015 – March 2016). This project was exhibited later in 2017 at PAC Milan under the title of AFRICA Raccontare un Mondo.

In 2015, Adelina von Füstenberg was the curator of the National Pavilion of Armenia at the 56th Venice Biennale, awarded with the Golden Lion for the best National Pavilion by the international Jury of the Venice Biennale.

In 2017 she conceived and curated the traveling show on the issues of sweet and marine water AQUA at Château de Penthes Geneva at SESC São Paulo Belenzhino and on the Island of Pescatori, Borromeo Islands, Italia. In the same year in the context of the 1st Triennale of Armenia, Standart the show THE MOUNT ANALOGUE (2017) in Yerevan, and Gyumri, Armenia. In 2018, one man show of the Benin artist George Adéagbo at Maison Tavel/MAH and the UN, Geneva. In 2019 the one man show of the Swiss artist Augustin Rebetez in São Paulo at SESC Consolaçao and Assab One, Milan and in Venice in 2021, during Covid-19, the one man show of the photos on people with disability by Christian Tasso and on the awarded project by the Italian Council of Stefano Boccalini LA RAGIONE DELLE MANI at the Maison Tavel/MAH, Geneva.

=== Film production ===
In 2008, to commemorate the 60th anniversary of the Universal Declaration of Human Rights (UDHR), she created and produced the long feature film Stories on Human Rights, inspired by the UDHR and composed a series of short movies directed by 22 video artists and filmmakers from all over the world. Premiered at the Palais de Chaillot, Trocadero, in Paris in December 2008, the film has been screened in more than 70 film festivals.

In 2010-2011, Adelina von Fürstenberg produced with ART for The World the new series of seven short films, THEN AND NOW Beyond Borders and Differences, under the auspices of the UN Alliance of Civilizations and the Council of Europe. Inspired by article 18 of the Universal Declaration of Human Rights, "Everyone has the right to freedom of thought, conscience and religion", the omnibus film involves seven independent well known filmmakers from five continents to promote tolerance by creating films and stories highlighting the long-standing historical, spiritual and cultural links across cultures and beliefs. The filmmakers were Tata Amaral (Brazil), Fanny Ardant (France), Hüseyin Karabey (Turkey), Masbedo (Italy), Idrissa Ouédraogo (Burkina Faso), Jafar Panahi (Iran), and Robert Wilson (US). A first series of five short movies was screened in a world première at the Museum of Modern Art in Rio de Janeiro on the occasion of the 3rd Forum of the Alliance of Civilizations, while the short movie The Accordion by Jafar Panahi was presented in a world première at Venice Days during the Venice International Film Festival in September 2010. The short Chimères Absentes by Fanny Ardant was premiered at the Rome Film Festival in October 2010. Since then, both the long feature and the single shorts have been independently distributed in more than 40 film festivals around the world.

In 2019, she produced Interdependence, an anthology composed of eleven short films with the participation of Silvio Soldini, Faouzi Bensaïdi, and Leon Wang, among others, under the patronage of the UN and the City of Milan. It was awarded in 2021 at the ILEEF (London Eco Film Festival). It also was awarded in 2020 at VIFF (Vienna Independent Film Festival) with Bettina Oberli's short film productions Kingdom, and with Daniela Thomas' Tua Ingugu shot in Amazonia awarded for best Brazilian short film in 2020 at SPFF (São Paulo International Short Film Festival.

In 2022, she produced INTERACTIONS, an anthology of twelve short films illustrating the pressing needs of wildlife in diverse bio-geographical and marine regions, as well as the capacity for adaptation that species must develop in order to survive. INTERACTIONS is as an excellent example of sustainability, cross-cultural cooperation between public and civil society and the partners of the film project. With the participation of Faouzi Bensaïdi (Morocco), Clemente Bicocchi (Italy), Anne de Carbuccia (France/USA), Takumã Kuikuro (Brazil), Oskar Metsavaht (Brazil), Eric Nazarian (Armenia/USA), Bettina Oberli (Switzerland), Idrissa Ouédraogo (Burkina Faso), Yulene Olaizola and Rubén Imaz (Mexico), Nila Madhab Panda (India), Janis Rafa (Greece), Isabella Rossellini (USA).

== Awards ==
- 2021 - London Eco Film Festival Award for Interdependence for Best Narrative Feature Film
- 2016 - Swiss Grand Award for Art / Prix Meret Oppenheim, conferred by the Federal Office of Culture, Swiss Confederation
- 2015 - Medal of Merit conferred by the Republic of Armenia
- 2015 - Golden Lion for the Best National Participation of the National Pavilion of Armenia at the 56th Biennale di Venezia
- 2008 - the label of Cultural Event 2008 by the Council of Europe for ART for The World’s film production of Stories on Human Rights, in recognition of a handful of exceptional and innovative artistic projects organized in Europe
- 1993 - Special Mention of the Jury of the 45th Biennale of Venice for the School of Curators of Le Magasin - Centre National d'Art Contemporain, Grenoble

== Other activities ==
- World Academy of Art and Science, Fellow

== Bibliography ==
- Meditations, ART for The World, Geneva 1997
- The Edge of Awareness, Charta, Milan 1998
- Philip Johnson, Mondadori Electa, Milan 1999
- ART for The World (1996-2002), ART for The World, Geneva 2002
- The Overexcited Body. Art and Sport in Contemporary Society, ART for The World, Geneva 2002
- Jannis Kounellis, Mondadori Electa, Milan 2003
- Donna Donne, Giunti Editore, Florence-Milan 2005
- Jannis Kounellis. Santa Fe, Boroli Foundation, 2006
- Marina Abramović. Balkan Epic, Skira, Milan 2006
- Collateral. When Art Looks at Cinema, Charta, Milan 2007
- William Kentridge, Liliana Moro, Robert Wilson & Michael Galasso, ART for The World, Milan 2007
- Urban Manners. 15 Contemporary Artists from India, Edizioni Zero, Milan 2007
- Stories on Human Rights by Filmmakers, Artists and Writers + DVD, Mondadori Electa, Milan 2008
- Joseph Kosuth, Mondadori, Electa, 2009
- Luca Pancrazzi. Stilllife, Trolleybooks, 2009
- Masbedo. Schegge d'incanto, Carlo Cambi Editore, Poggibonsi, 2010
- Philippe Perrin. Always the Sun, Editions Al Dante, 2010
- Participation, Mousse Publishing, 2016

Written in Portuguese:

- Marina Abramović, Balkan Erotic Epic, SESC SP, São Paulo, Brazil 2006
- Mulher Mulheres, SESC SP, Sao Paulo, Brazil 2007
- Colateral 2. Quando a arte olha o cinema, SESC SP, São Paulo, Brazil 2008
- Robert Wilson. VOOM Portraits, SESC SP, Sao Paulo, Brazil 2008
- Urban Manners 2, SESC SP, Sao Paulo, Brazil 2010
