= Vivian Ostrovsky =

American filmmaker (born 1945)

Vivian Ostrovsky (born 1945) is an experimental filmmaker and curator.

== Biography ==
Ostrovsky was born in 1945 New York City, US, and spent most of her childhood years in Rio de Janeiro, Brazil. She completed a B.A. degree in Psychology in Paris, at the Institut de Psychologie, and later enrolled in Film Studies at the Université de la Sorbonne Nouvelle. She was later a student of Henri Langlois at the Cinémathèque Française and of Éric Rohmer at the Institut d'Art et d'Archéologie.

In the 1970s, together with Rosine Grange, Ostrovsky founded the non-profit organization Ciné-Femmes International (first called Femmes/Media), dedicated to the promotion, distribution and exhibition of films made by women. During its active years (1975–1979) Ciné-Femmes International addressed the lack of distribution and exhibition opportunities for women’s films. It was the only organization in France at the time to initiate film screenings, programs and symposia, focusing on women's filmmaking and on women’s image on film. They toured with women's documentaries, features, animation short and experimental films, distributing them where needed, much before the advent of formats such as VHS and DVD. In 1975 - declared International Women's Year by the United Nations – Ostrovsky, together with Esta Marshall, organized a major women's film festival in Paris (Femmes/Films), as well as an international symposium – Women in Film - under the auspices of UNESCO. This event was held in St. Vincent, the Aosta Valley, with participants such as Susan Sontag, Agnès Varda, Helma Sanders-Brahms, Chantal Akerman, Mai Zetterling, Márta Mészáros, Valie Export and María Luisa Bemberg. An international association, Film Women International, was the outcome of this venture.

In 1980 Ostrovsky launched into experimental filmmaking with a debut film, Carolyn 2, co-directed by Martine Rousset and starring choreographer Carolyn Carlson. Since then, Ostrovsky has made over 30 films mostly shot in Super-8, often incorporating found footage such as newsreels, excerpts from feature and documentary films, as well as personal home movies. As described by yann beauvais, Ostrovsky's films combine two genres of experimental film – the film journal and the film-collage – creating her unique version which beauvais names 'journal-mosaic'. Her films are often referred to as nomadic as they cross between countries, cultures and subject matters.

Ostrovsky's international screening venues include: Centre Georges Pompidou, Paris (retrospective); MAM, Rio de Janeiro (retrospective); MoMA, New York; Hirshhorn Museum, Washington; Musée du Louvre, Paris; Musée d'Art Moderne de la Ville de Paris; Kunsthalle Basel, and major film Festivals such as Toronto, London, Berlin, Rotterdam, Viennale, Locarno, Tribeca and others. Her works have been acquired by collections and archives such as MoMA, New York; Centre Georges Pompidou, Paris; Freunde der Deutsche Kinemathek, Berlin; the French Foreign Affairs Ministry (for the French Institutes worldwide).

Following her father, George Ostrovsky, who was one of the founders of the Jerusalem Film Center in Israel, Vivian has been active as a member of its board of directors and is one of the film curators for the Jerusalem Film Festival held yearly by the Jerusalem Cinematheque. She is also currently on the Board of Directors of Film Forum, a New York based non-profit movie theater with independent and repertory programming.

Her other activities include: curating film programs for the Centro Cultural Banco do Brasil (CCBB) in Rio de Janeiro, composing several radio pieces for the French public radio station France Culture (Ateliers de Création Radiophonique), and a children’s book in cooperation with her sister Rose Ostrovsky (MUMPS!).

== Filmography ==
- Carolyn 2 (1980) starring choreographer Carolyn Carlson, co-directed with Martine Rousset
- Top Ten Stylists (1980) with Thierry Mugler, Issey Miyake, Karl Lagerfeld, etc., co-directed with Soft Ware Prod.
- Movie (V.O.) (1982)
- Copacabana Beach (1983)
- Allers-Venues (1984)
- Stalingrad (1984) installation for "Le Génie de la Bastille"
- U.S.S.A.(1985)
- * * * (Trois Etoiles) (1987)
- Propos Décousus (1987) expanded super 8
- Eat (1988)
- M.M. in Motion (1992)
- Uta Makura (Pillow poems) (1995)
- Public Domain (1996)
- American International Pictures (1995)
- Interview with Woody Allen for the Jerusalem Film Festival (1997)
- Work and Progress (1999) co-directed with Yann Beauvais
- Nikita Kino (2002)
- Ice/Sea (2005)
- Télépattes (2007)
- Fone Fur Follies (2008)
- Ne Pas Sonner (2008)
- The Title Was Shot (2009)
- Tatitude (2009)
- P.W. – Painéis e Pincéis (2010)
- Ocean Bazar (2011) 16 mm installation
- Wherever Was Never There (2011)
- CORrespondência e REcorDAÇÕES (2013)
- Splash (2013) 16mm installation
- Losing the Thread (2014)
- On Dizziness (2016) video installation
- But Elsewhere is Always Better (2016)
- DizzyMess (2017)
- Hiatus (2018)
- Unsound (2019)
- AtmoSphere (2020)
- SON CHANT (2020)
- Elizabeth Bishop: From Brazil with Love Co-directed by Ruti Gadish (2025)
