= Maritza Morillas =

Mexican artist (born 1969)

Maritza Morillas (born 1969) is a contemporary painter from Mexico. Her works are typified by dark imagery of death and decomposition. Her work also delves into social issues such as contemporary the food industry, with imagery of the preternatural and horrific techniques used in factory farming. She is also well known in Mexico for her work dealing with the deaths in Ciudad Juárez, the mass murder of young women along the U.S.-Mexico border.

Morillas graduated from the school of artes plásticas at UNAM (Universidad Nacional Autónoma de México). Major influences on her work are Francisco de Goya and Arturo Rivera. She is currently a member of MujerArte A.C., a Mexican feminist art collective led by artist and social justice activist Yan Maria Castro.
