= Parque Vía =

- Directed by: Enrique Rivero
- Release date: 2008
- Running time: 86 minutes
- Country: Mexico

Parque Vía is a Mexican film directed by Enrique Rivero. It won the Golden Leopard at the 2008 Locarno International Film Festival and the Golden Crow Pheasant for Best Film at the 2008 International Film Festival of Kerala.
