= Teresa Serrano =

Mexican painter, sculptor, and filmmaker

Teresa Serrano (1936) is a Mexican painter, sculptor, and filmmaker. She gained recognition through her work in filmmaking in the mid to late 1990s. Her main focus has been "to make forceful commentaries on power relationships, sexism, and violence against women".

== Biography ==
Teresa Serrano was born in Mexico City in 1936. Serrano married at age nineteen and eventually had six children. After her children had grown up, Serrano divorced her husband in 1982 and moved to New York to begin a career in art. Her husband had previously prevented her from going into the art world. These particular limitations in Serrano's life had been a contributing influence in the creation of her art.

In New York City, Serrano connected with poets like David Shapiro and Raphael Rubinstein.

Serrano often collaborated with close friends who were artists, but it was not until 1997 that Serrano began experimenting with other types of media to widen discourse about female roles within society. Her first video was in regards to migration and memory. She then ventured off to a television style of producing art which stemmed from her love of films. Using familiar media, such as soap operas, helped Serrano connect with audiences more clearly. It also led her to work with several female actresses and directors. She recalls her inspiration in various female filmmakers such as Sophie Calle and Chantel Akerman. When it came to sculptures she used multiple materials like "iron, steel, fabric, ceramic, and fiberglass."

== Themes ==
Most of Serrano's work derives from the issue of female inequality and treatment in society. When she had created La piñata, she went to the area that had influenced her video and took photos of the town where the women had been murdered. She wanted to make a connection between the viewer and the subjects of those photographs. It was meant to compel viewers to understand the bigger issue about femicide and how there wasn't any justice for it.

== Notable work ==
Serrano is mostly known for her exhibition titled Albur de Amor. In this work, she captures all her photography and video art and puts them together. It explores the different themes she has worked with like sexual harassment, women's place in the workforce, and the feeling of being trapped as a woman in a male-dominated society.

== Education ==
In addition to being a self-taught artist, Serrano has studied with Mexican artists Carlos Orozco Romero and Javier Arevalo.

== Personal life ==
Serrano has stated that she is not religious. She resides and works in both Mexico and New York City.

== Artwork ==
La piñata (2003) Included in Serrano's "Rituals" video piece, La piñata showcases a man taunting and hitting a pinata shaped like a woman. Serrano had created this in response to the 2001 rape attacks and murders of women near Ciudad Juarez. A piñata shaped like a woman dangles from the ceiling as a man physically harasses it with a stick. Serrano was one of the first artists to use her craft to highlight and address femicide and gender violence.

Restraint (2006) With video as a medium, Serrano herself portrays a woman who tries to soften the voice of a hotel bell. Her finger is stuck on the bell as she frantically attempts to write. Annoyed, the woman attempts to use earplugs and headphones to cancel the noise, to no avail. She eventually puts a black hood over herself, and this calms her. The piece is symbolic of the suppression of women in society and speaks to the limitations placed on women to limit development and fulfillment.

Glass Ceiling (2008) Short film exhibited by Art for the World. A woman is seen going up some stairs, but is stopped by a man. The piece discusses the sexism and patriarchy that women may face in the workplace as they attempt to advance in a career.

== Exhibitions ==
=== Solo exhibitions ===
- 1989 Ofrendas. Galería de Arte Mexicano, Ciudad de Mexico
- 1990 Rituals. Anne Plumb Gallery, New York, NY
- 1991 New Paintings. Wenger Gallery, Los Angeles, California
- 1993 Flores Concretas. Galería GAM, Ciudad de Mexico. Esculturas. Galería Ramis Barquet, Monterrey, Mexico
- 1994 Sculpture. Annina Nosei Gallery, New York, NY
- 1996 La Montaña, el Rio y Las Piedras. Galería Ramis Barquet, Monterrey, Mexico
- 1997 Siempre el pasto del vecino es mas verde. Museo de Arte Moderno de Buenos Aires Buenos Aires, Argentina. Teresa Serrano: New Sculpture. Annina Nosei Gallery, New York, NY.
- 1998 Espejo Ovular. Galería Nina Menocal, Ciudad de Mexico
- 2002 Garden of Eden, Nina Menocal Galería, Ciudad de Mexico. Formas de Violencia, Laboratorio/Arte Alameda, Ciudad de Mexico. Dissolving the Memory of Home. John Micheal Kohler Arts Center Sheboygan, Wisconsin, USA
- 2010 Sin Llegar a Ser Palabra, [EDS] GALERIA, Ciudad de Mexico
- 2012 Teresa Serrano, Albur de Amor, CAAM, Las Palmas de Gran Canaria, Espana.
- 2013 DESENLACE: Teressa Serrano e Miguel Angel Rios. Ol Futuro Flamego, Rio de Janeiro, Brasil. Teresa Serrano. Albur de Amor, TEA Tenerife espacio de las Artes, Tenerife, Canarias, Espana
- 2014 Teresa Serrano, Albur de Amor, Museo Atrium. Victoria-Gasteiz, Pais Vasco, Espana
- 2015 Teresa Serrano. Museo Amparo, Puebla, Mexico
- 2017 Teresa Serrano. Vanity, [EDS] Galería, Mexico 2
- 2018 Killing Fields, Freijo Gallery, Madrid, Espana. The Forgotten History of the First Drug War. Galería Senda, Barcelona, Espana.

=== Group exhibitions ===
- 1992 Uncommon Ground: 23 Latin American Artists, SUNY New Paltz, New York, USA.
- 1996 Inklusion:Exklusion, Art in the Age of Post-Colonialism and Global Migration. Streirischer Herbst, Graz, Austria.
- 1997 El individuo y su memoria. 6a. Bienal de la Habana, La Habana, Cuba. Trade Routes: History and Geography. Johannesburg Biennale, Johannesburd, South Africa.
- 1998 Bienal Barro de America. Museo de Arte Contemporaneo, Caracas, Venezuela.
- 2002 Video-Zone, The 1st International video-art biennale in Israel Center for Contemporary Art, Tel Aviv, Israel. Sugar and Spice and Everything Nice. Nikolai Fine Art, Nueva York, NY, USA.
- 2003 Black and White. Gabriela Rivet Gallery. Colonia, Alemania. Gewalt Macht SpaB, (Kunstlervideos), Nacht der Museen, Frankfurt, Alemania. A Room of Her Own, The East Cinema Village, screen 6, Nueva York, NY, USA. LA Film Festival, National Fairmont Cinema, Los Angeles, USA. 1er Festivalde Mujeres Mexicanas en el Cine y la Television, Cineteca Nacional, Cd. de Mex. A Room of Her Own, Cannes Film Festival, Cannes, Francia. The Diva Fair: Moving Images, Hotel Windsor, Nueva, NY, USA. Miami Basel Art Fair: Problematic. Town House Hotel, Palm Beach, FL, USA.
- 2004 New York International Immigration Film Festival NYIFF, Brooklyn, New York, USA.
- 2005 El infierno de lo bello-Barrocos y Neobarrocos. Domus Atrium 2002, Salamanca, Espana. Carcel de amor. Museo Nacional Centro de Arte Reina Sofia, Madrid, Espana. Against our Will. CSC Bard Galleries, NY, USA. La Costilla Maldita. Museo MEIAC, Badajoz, Espana. Emap 5: Media in "f" , Ewha Woman University, Seul, Corea del Sur. International Biennale of Contemporary Art. National Gallery in Prague, Praga, Rep. Checa
- 2006 Frontera 450+. Station Museum of Contemporary Art, Houston, Texas, USA. Maedels, Gabriela Rivete Gallery, Colonia, Alemania. "La Performance Expandia", Sala de Arte Puerta Nueva, Universidad de Cordoba, Espana.
- 2007 "Mulher, Mulheres". SESC, São Paulo, Brasil
- 2008 Stories of Human Rights by Filmmakers, Artisan Writers. Istanbul Film Festival, Estambul, Turquia. Stories of Human Rights by Filmmakers, Artisan Writers. Jerusalem International Film Festival. Jerusalen, Israel. Stories of Human Rights by Filmmakers, Artisan Writers. Sarajevo Film Festival, BosinaHerzegovina. Out of Touch, Kunsthalle Wien, Viena, Austria. Turn and Widen. The 5th Seoul International Media Art Biennale, Seul, Corea Del Sur. Play Forward. The 61st Festival International Film Festival, Locarno, Suiza.
- 2009 "TAL Y COMO ESTA LA COSA" Video Abierto Programa Murcia, Espana. "Hecho en casa" Una aproximacion a las practicas objetuales en el arte Mexicano Contemporaneo. Museo de Arte Moderno, Ciudad de Mexico. TEXT-WORKS/ CON-TEXTO/, [EDC] GALERIA, Ciudad de Mexico. Constellations, "The Man Who Fell to Earth", Beijing 798 Biennial, Beijing, China. Arte Video Night TV Show, Centre Pompidou, Paris, Francia. La Femindad Craquelada, CAS Centro de Arte Sevilla, Sevilla, Espana. FOR YOU, The Daros-Latinamerica Tapes and Video Installations, Daros Latinamerica, Zurich, Switzerland.
- 2010 Faux Amis, une videotheque ephemere. Jeu de Paume, Paris, Francia. Shadow Dance. Kunsthal KadE, Amersfoort, Paises Bajos. No one more, The Juarze Murders. The Leonard Pearlstein Gallery at Drexel University, Philadelphia, PA, USA. CONTRAVIOLENCIAS Praticas artistcas contra contra la agresion a la mujer. Koldo Mitxelena Kulturunea, Donostia- San Sebastian, Guipuzcoa. Drawing the Line,[EDC] GALERIA, Ciudad de Mexico.
- 2011 ARTE VIDEO NIGHT #3: RESISTANCE, La Cinematheque de Toulouse, Toulouse, Francia. ARTE VIDEO NIGHT #3: RESISTANCE, La Gaite Lyrique, Paris, Francia. "Meridianos" Daros Latinamerica. Oi Futura Flamengo, Rio de Janeiro, Brasil. "Unresolved Circumstances: Video Art from Latin America", Museum of Latin American Art, California, USA.
- 2012 In-Out-House. Circuitos de genero y violencia en la era Tecnologica, Universidad Politecnica de Valencia, Valencia, Espana. El elogio de la locura. Fundacion Chirivella Soriano de la Comunidad de Valencia, Valenicia, Espana. Imagenes extremas de mujeras a traves de la combatividad y de la Restistencia". Centro Cultural El Matadero de Madrid. Madrid, Espana.
- 2013 TE(A)MO. Universidad de Cantabria, Cantabria, Espana. Mapping Gender, School of Arts and Aesthetics, Jawaharlal Nehru University, New Delhi, India. Arte Video Night, Palais de Tokyo, Paris, Francia. FEMINIS-ARTE Audiovisules y Genero, Sala Berlanga, Madrid, Espana. superreal: alternative realities in photography and video. Museo del Barrio, New York, NY, USA. MACO Art Fair, [EDS] Galeria, Mexico. In-Out-House, Circuitos de genero y violencia en la era Tecnologica, SALA X Universidad de Vigo. Pontevedra, Espana. The Emo Show, EFA Project Space, New York, NY, USA. Words of Art, [EDS] Galeria, Ciudad de Mexico.
- 2014 ARTE Video Night 2014, Palais de Tokyo, Paris, Francia. FEMINART. MUJERES Y NARRACIONES ESTETICAS GENERICAS EN SEVILLA, Centro Cultural Cajasol, Sevilla, Espana. VI Semana de Video Iberoamericano FeminisArte II. CENTROCENTRO Cibeles de Cultra y Ciudadania 5CS, Madrid, Espana. 1st Bienal de Arte de Cartagena, BIACI, Cartagena de Indias, Colombia. MACO Art Fair [EDS] Galeria, Ciudad de Mexico.
- 2015 Contingent Beauty: Contemporary Art from Latin America. The Museum of Fine Arts, Houston, Texas. Dark Mirror, Art from Latin America since 1968, Kunstmuseum Wolfsburg, Wolfsburg, Germany. DARO Latinamerica. Fundacion Proa, Daros Latinamerica, Buenos Aires, Argentina.
- 2016 Daros Latinamerica Collection, Kunstmuseum Bern, Bern, Suiza. "My Father Avoids the Sirens' Song" Josee Bienvenu Gallery, New York. AQUI HACE FALTA UNA MUJER, Cicio de Videoarte, Centro de Cultura Digital, Cd. de Mex. La Corteza del Alma. Galeria Fernando Pradilla, Madrid, Espana. MACO Art Fair [EDS] Galeria Ciudad de Mexico.
- 2017 Home- So Different, So Appealing, Los Angeles County Museum of Art, Los Angeles, California. Landmarks Video Season. College of Fine Arts, Austin, Texas. LOOP Festival, Barcelona, Espana. MACO Art Fair, [EDS] Galeria, Ciudad de Mexico. Feminicidio en Mexico, !Ya Basta!, Museo Memoria y tolerancia, Ciudad de Mexico.
- 2018 Home-So Different, So Appealing, Museum of Fine Arts, Houston, Texas.

== Collections ==
- The Museum of Fine Arts, Houston
- Daros Latinamerica Collection
- Cemex México
- CAAM Centro Atlántico de Arte Moderno, Canarias; Museo ARTIUM, Vitoria-Gasteiz
- MEIAC Museo Extremeño e Iberoamericano de Arte Contemporáneo, Badajoz; Museo Amparo, Puebla
- MARCO Museo de Arte Contemporáneo de Monterrey.

== Awards ==
- 1994 - 2nd National Price of Outdoor Sculpture. Primer Certamen de Escultura al Aire Libre Corredor de la Roma. Delegacion Cuauhtemoc. Galeria OMR y Galeria

Nina Menocoal. Consejo Nacional Para la Cultura ya Las Artes, Cd. de Mexico.

- 1995 - Honorable Mention, 2nd Sculpture Biennale. Museo Arte Contemporaneo de Monterrey, Mexico
- 2001 - First prize Playgrounds and Toys, Geneva Switzerland. ONU and Adelina Von Furstenberg . United Nations, New York, NY. USA- New Delhi, India.

== Bibliography ==
1. Serrano, Teresa, and Gutiérrez Rufina. Material didáctico: Actividades Para El Descubrimiento, Unidades guía, Preescolar. Instituto De Estudios Pedagógicos, 1983.
2. Sichel, Berta M. 14 Artistas: Leandro Katz, Lorraine O'Grady, Teresa Serrano, Hanne Nielsen y Birgit Johnsen, Lotty Rosenfeld, Dana Levy, Marta Chilindron, Valie Export, Germaine Dulac, Yvonne Rainer, Wolf Vostell, Jeremy Blake, Ulrike Ottinger, But Barr. Athenaica, Ediciones Universitarias, 2017.
3. FINNEGAN, NUALA. CULTURAL REPRESENTATIONS OF FEMINICIDIO AT THE US -MEXICO BORDER. ROUTLEDGE, 2018.
4. “At the Met...from Winterthur” New York Magazine, 17 Oct. 1994, p. 119.
5. “Teresa Serrano. Albur De Amor.” Artium, 31 Jan. 2014, www.artium.org/en/exhibitions/item/55849-teresa-serrano.-albur-de-amor.
