= Art for The World =

Non-governmental organization based in Geneva

ART for The World is a non-governmental organization (NGO) associated with the United Nations Department of Public Information (UNDPI). It is based in Geneva, Switzerland, and since 2005 has collaborated with its sister association ART for The World Europa, based in Milan, Italy. In 1995, Adelina von Fürstenberg founded ART for The World within Dialogues de Paix (Dialogues of Peace), an international contemporary art exhibition which she curated on the occasion of the 50th anniversary of the United Nations.

== Overview ==
ART for The World is inspired by Article 27 of the Universal Declaration of Human Rights, which proclaims creative activity as an essential part of people's well-being ("Everyone has the right freely to participate in the cultural life of the community, to enjoy the arts..."). Its mission is to create, through the universal language of art, a meaningful and enduring dialogue among people and cultures in order to encourage tolerance and solidarity and to foster education as a human right.

ART for The World works in close collaboration with the artists' community and with the institutions that defend and promote the principles of human rights: the United Nations, the World Health Organization (WHO), the High Commissioner for Refugees (UNHCR), and the European Parliament.

It presents its projects in sites which do not belong to the traditional contemporary art circuit, such as ancient monuments, monasteries, medersas, public buildings, schools, islands, parks, stadium and other open spaces. Art for The World organises exhibitions, lectures, conferences, publishes books and produces films.

== History ==
Among its main exhibitions, in 1997 Art for The World organised Meditations, at Medersa Ibn Youssef, Marrakesh, Morocco, with a large number of international artists, such as Alighiero e Boetti, Shirazeh Houshiary, Ilya Kabakov, Kacimi, Anish Kapoor, Rachid Koraichi, Sol LeWitt, Maria Carmen Perlingeiro, and Chen Zhen.

In 1998, on the occasion of the 50th anniversary of the World Health Organization, it curated the international travelling exhibition The Edge of Awareness, in Geneva, New York, São Paulo, New Delhi and Milan.

In 2000, for the 50th anniversary of the High Commissioner of Human Rights (OHCHR), AfTW created the project Playgrounds and Toys for refugee children. Since then, it has built playgrounds designed by artists in India, Armenia, and the United Kingdom. Fabrice Gygi, Fabiana de Barros, Joseph Kosuth, Andreas Angelikakis and Eleni Kostika were among the invited artists and architects.

In 2001, within the Program for the Elimination of Racial Discrimination of the United Nations, AfTW promoted The Overexcited Body, an international itinerant art exhibition on the role of sport in the contemporary world in Geneva, Milan and São Paulo, with artists such as Sylvie Fleury, Miltos Manetas, Tracey Moffatt, Hélio Oiticica, and Nam June Paik.

In 2005-2007, for the 10th anniversary of the Beijing Women Convention, AfTW organised Woman Women, an international touring exhibition, in Geneva, Florence and São Paulo with artworks by Marina Abramović, Shirin Neshat, Wang Du, Ghada Amer, and Berlinde De Bruyckere.

In 2007-2010 AfTW organized the large itinerant exhibition on Indian art Urban Manners. 15 Contemporary Artists from India, featuring works by internationally well-known Indian artists such as Sheba Chhachhi, Atul Dodiya, Bharti Kher, Subodh Gupta, Ranbir Kaleka, Jitish Kallat, Raghubir Singh, and Vivan Sundaram. The exhibition was presented in Milan and São Paulo, Brazil.

In 2010 in the contest of the event "Vivere Sani Vivere Bene" (Live Healthy, Live Well), the Fondazione Zoé/Zambon Group invited AfTW to organize an exhibition focused on the theme of health and in particular on breath, as an ideal prosecution of the first collaboration for the exhibition The Edge of Awareness in 1998 . The exhibition Respiro/Breath was presented in various spaces and venues around the city of Vicenza, featuring audio and video installations by Vito Acconci, and Nikos Navridis, and billboards by Stefano Arienti, Alfredo Jaar, Ilya Kabakov, Sol LeWitt, and Pat Steir.

In 2011-2012 AfTW organized The Mediterranean Approach, an itinerant exhibition under the auspices of the Cultural Council of the Union pour la Méditerranée (UPM) and Marseille Provence 2013, Cultural Capital of Europe. Aiming to emphasize differences as well as similarities as part of the underlying deep identity connecting all Mediterranean peoples, the exhibition was presented at Palazzo Zenobio in Venice (2011), during the Venice Biennale, in Marseille at the mac - Museum of Contemporary Art (2012), and will tour to SESC Pinheiros in São Paulo (Brazil) during the São Paulo Biennal in September 2012, in collaboration with the Regional Direction of SESC São Paulo.

Since 2008, AfTW has been producing and distributing film projects related to the main human, cultural and social issues. In 2008, to commemorate the 60th anniversary of the Universal Declaration of Human Rights, AfTW produced Stories on Human Rights, a long feature film inspired by the UDHR and composed by a series of short movies directed by 22 video artists (including Marina Abramović, Pipilotti Rist, and Runa Islam) and independent filmmakers from all over the world (including Sergei Bodrov, Hany Abu Assad, Abderrhamane Sissako, and Zang-Ke Jia). The film was screened in more than 70 film festivals and events during 2009-2010.

In 2010-2011 AfTW produced the new series of seven short films THEN AND NOW Beyond Borders and Differences, under the auspices of the UN Alliance of Civilizations and the Council of Europe. Inspired by article 18 of the Universal Declaration of Human Rights, "Everyone has the right to freedom of thought, conscience and religion", the omnibus film involves seven independent well known filmmakers from five continents promoting tolerance by creating films and stories highlighting the long-standing historical, spiritual and cultural links across cultures and beliefs. The filmmakers were Tata Amaral (Brazil), Fanny Ardant (France), Hüseyin Karabey (Turkey), Masbedo (Italy), Idrissa Ouedraogo (Burkina Faso), Jafar Panahi (Iran), and Robert Wilson (US). A first series of five short movies was screened in a world première at the Museum of Modern Art in Rio de Janeiro on the occasion of the 3rd Forum of the Alliance of Civilizations, while the short movie The Accordion by Jafar Panahi was presented in a world première at Venice Days during the Venice International Film Festival in September 2010. The short Chimères Absentes by Fanny Ardant was premiered at the Rome Film Festival in October 2010. Since then, both the long feature and the single shorts independently have been distributed in more than 40 film festivals around the world.

AfTW is currently working on a new production, the fiction film Myths and Misconceptions (working title), to eliminate cancer as a life-threatening disease for future generations and to support the mission of those who are fighting this illness. The film will be composed of six original short movies by worldwide awarded filmmakers, among them whom are Karim Aïnouz (Brazil), Faouzi Bensaïdi (Morocco), Sergei Bodrov (Russia/USA), Xiaolu Guo (China), and Hüseyin Karabey (Turkey). Along with medical research, awareness, responsibility and action are some of the major weapons against cancer. Myths and Misconceptions aims to present and discuss issues related to cancer, cancer control and cancer prevention, and increasing awareness as well as hope in fighting this illness, with the help of the great variety of themes concretely illustrated by the different short films.

== Exhibitions, film projects and conferences ==
1996, Bajo el Volcàn (Under the Volcano), Exconvento de la Nativitad, Tepoztlan, Mexico

1996, Robert Rauschenberg in San Lazzaro, Armenian Monastery, Isle of San Lazzaro, Venice, Italy

1997, Méditations (Meditations), Medersa Ibn Youssef, Marrakesh, Morocco

1997, Concert by Michael Galasso, Mocenigo Palace, Venice, Italy

1998-99, The Edge of Awareness, travelling exhibition, Geneva, New York, São Paulo, New Delhi, Milan

1999, The Children's Museum in Guadalajara by Philip Johnson, Palazzo Zenobio, Venice, Italy

2000, Playgrounds and Toys for Refugee Children, travelling exhibition, Geneva, Switzerland

2000, Art et Réalités Sociales (Art and Social Realities), Geneva, Switzerland

2000, Alfredo Jaar. The Silence. The Rwanda Project 1994-2000, Geneva, Switzerland

2001, The Overexcited Body. Art and Sport in Contemporary Society, travelling exhibition, Milan, São Paulo

2002, Playgrounds and Toys, travelling exhibition, Lugano, London

2002, Building of the Playground designed by Fabiana de Barros for a gypsy camp near Athens, Greece

2002, Building of the Playgrounds designed by Fabrice Gygi, Joseph Kosuth and Edgard Soares, Deepalaya School in Kalkaji, New Delhi, India

2003, Building of the Playground designed by Andreas Angelidakis, John Kirakossian School, Yerevan, Armenia

2004, Video Installations by Sarkis, New Delhi, India

2004, Playgrounds and Toys, travelling exhibition, Musée Océanographique, Monaco

2005, Femme(s), Musée de Carouge, Geneva, Switzerland

2005, Santa Fe by Jannis Kounellis, Isola Madre, Borromeo Islands, Lake Maggiore, Italy

2005, Donna Donne (Woman Women), Palazzo Strozzi, Firenze, Italy

2005, Playgrounds and Toys, travelling exhibition, Hangar Bicocca, Milan, Italy

2005, Building of the Playground designed by Margherita Turewicz Lafranchi, Deepalaya School, Haryana, India

2006, Balkan Erotic Epic by Marina Abramović, SESC Pinheiros, São Paulo, Brazil

2006, 2nd Edition of Contemporary Art on the Lake Maggiore Isola Madre, Borromeo Islands, Lake Maggiore, Italy

2006, Vito Acconci, Conference, Milan, Italy

2006, Balkan Epic by Marina Abramović, Hangar Bicocca, Milan, Italy

2007, Urban Manners. 15 Contemporary Artists from India, Hangar Bicocca, Milan, Italy

2007, Joseph Kosuth. The Language of Equilibrium, Island of San Lazzaro degli Armeni, Venice, Italy

2007, Collateral. When Art Looks at Cinema, Hangar Bicocca, Milan, Italy

2007, Mulher Mulheres, SESC Paulista, São Paulo, Brazil

2008, Stories on Human Rights by Filmmakers, Writers and Artists, a collective film project by 22 renowned artists and filmmakers

2008, Voom Portraits-Robert Wilson, SESC Pinheiros, São Paulo, Brazil

2008, Collateral 2. When Art Looks at Cinema, SESC Paulista, São Paulo, Brazil

2009, La Prua by Marta dall'Angelo, Milan, Italy

2009, Teorema di Incompletezza by Masbedo, Milan, Italy

2009, Stillife by Luca Pancrazzi, Milan, Italy

2009, Questioni di Lingua by Claudio Citterio, Diego Morandini, Luisa Protti, Milan, Italy

2010, Urban Manners 2, SESC Pompeia, São Paulo, Brazil

2010, Danser la musique, Playground by Chen Zhen, Shenzhen, China

2010, Una domenica al Parco Sempione by Flavio de Marco, Milan, Italy

2010, A cena con Timeo by Letizia Cariello, Milan, Italy

2010, Aral_Citytellers by Francesco Jodice, Milan, Italy

2010, La scimmia, l'immagine e il suo doppio by Andrea Marescalchi, Milan, Italy

2010, Respiro/Breath, Fondazione Zoé, Spazio Monotono, Loggia del Capitaniato and Teatro Comunale, Vicenza, Italy

2010-2011, THEN AND NOW Beyond Borders and Differences, a collective film project by seven renowned filmmakers

2011, A cosa servono le mostre? (What are exhibitions for?), two-day symposium with the participation of artists, museum directors, curators and art critics working in Milan and in the region, La Fabbrica del Vapore/Care of, Milan, Italy

2011-2012, The Mediterranean Approach, travelling exhibition: Palazzo Zenobio, Venice, Italy; mac-Musée d'Art Contemporain, Marseille, France; SESC Pinheiros, São Paulo, Brazil

2013 Myths and Misconceptions, a collective film project by six internationally acclaimed filmmakers (to be released)
