= Society and culture in Saint Petersburg =

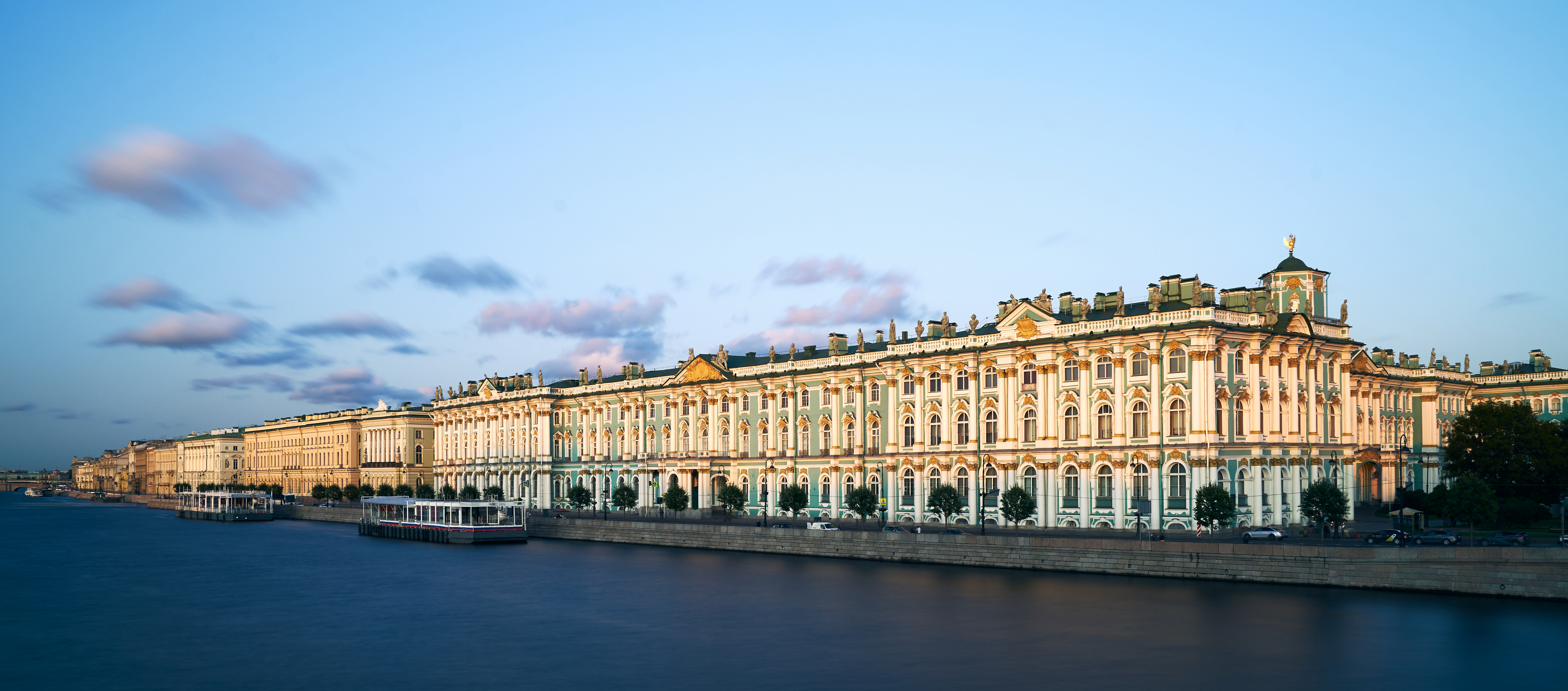
The Hermitage Museum complex. From left to right: Hermitage Theatre, Old Hermitage, Small Hermitage, Winter Palace (the "New Hermitage" is situated behind the Old Hermitage)

Saint Petersburg is known as the cultural centre of Russia. Its best known museum is the Hermitage.

== Music in Saint Petersburg ==
Among the city's more than fifty theaters is the world-famous Mariinsky Theater (also known as the Kirov Theater in the USSR), home to the Mariinsky Ballet company and opera. Leading ballet dancers, such as Vaslav Nijinsky, Anna Pavlova, Rudolph Nureyev, Mikhail Baryshnikov, Galina Ulanova and Natalia Makarova, were principal stars of the Mariinsky ballet.

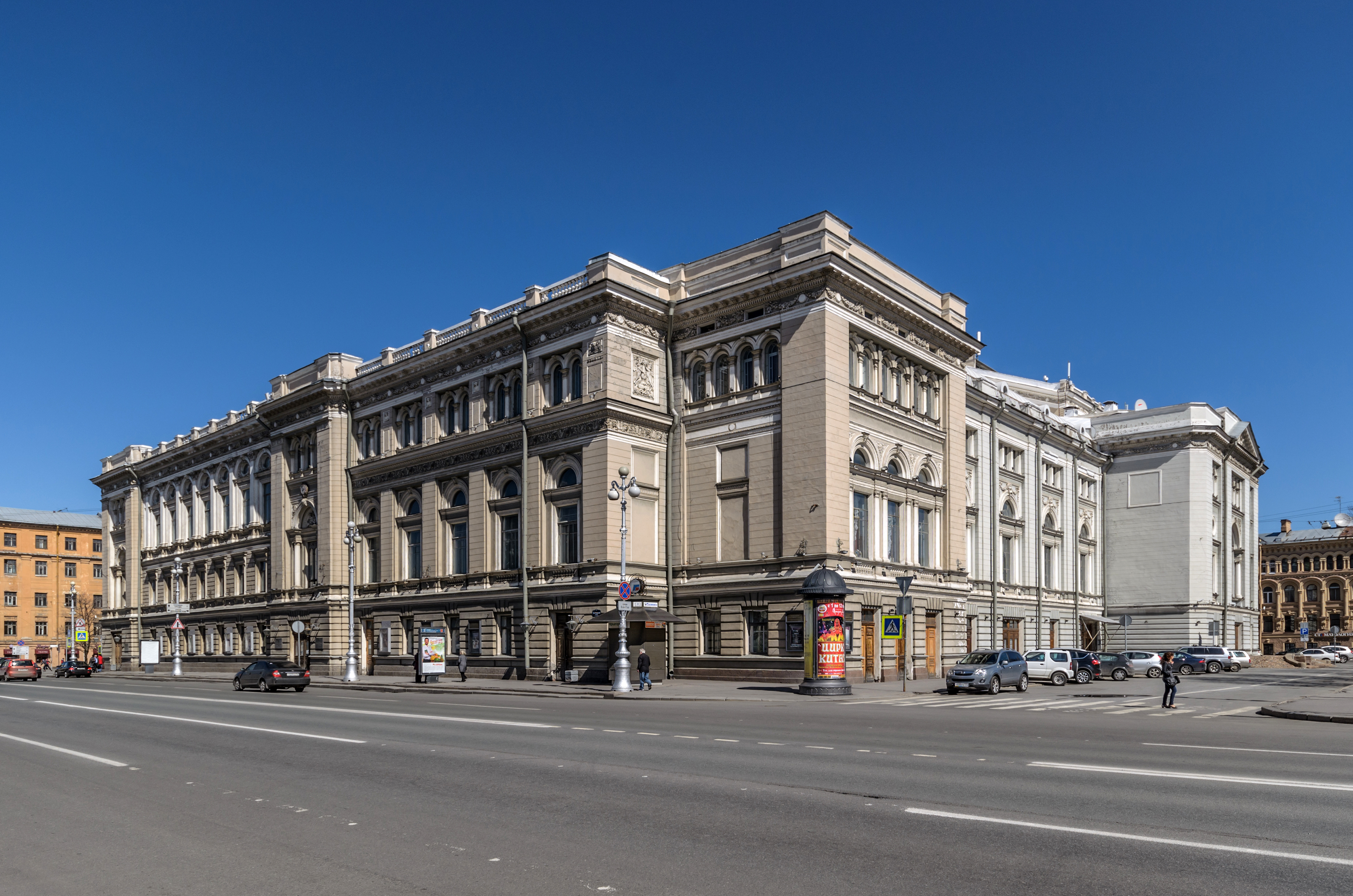
Saint Petersburg Conservatory

Dmitri Shostakovich was born and brought up in St. Petersburg, and dedicated his Seventh Symphony to the city, calling it the "Leningrad Symphony." He wrote the symphony while in Leningrad during the Nazi siege. The 7th symphony was premiered in 1942; its performance in the besieged Leningrad at the Bolshoy Philharmonic Hall under the baton of conductor Karl Eliasberg was heard over the radio and lifted the spirits of the survivors; each musician received 125 grams of bread after the premiere. In 1992 a reunion performance of the 7th Symphony by the (then) 14 survivors was played in the same hall as they done half a century ago. The Saint Petersburg Philharmonic Orchestra remained one of the best known symphony orchestras in the world under the leadership of conductors Yevgeny Mravinsky and Yuri Temirkanov.

Choral music has a great tradition here. The Imperial Choral Capella was founded and modeled after the royal courts of other European capitals. The Male Choir of St Petersburg moved to the City of St Petersburg in the 18th century from Moscow. At the end of the 19th century, the choir numbered 90. 40 adults and 50 boys (women were not admitted). Of the 22 basses, 7 were profundi capable of reaching bottom G easily. These unique voices are produced on Russian soil to this day.

St. Petersburg has been home to the newest movements in popular music. The first jazz band in the Soviet Union was founded here by Leonid Utyosov in the 1920s, under the patronage of Isaak Dunayevsky. The first jazz club in the Soviet Union was founded here in the 1950s, and later was named jazz club Kvadrat. In 1956 the popular ensemble Druzhba was founded by Aleksandr Bronevitsky and Edita Piekha, becoming the first popular band in the 1950s USSR. In the 1960s student rock-groups Argonavty, Kochevniki and others pioneered a series of unofficial and underground rock concerts and festivals. In 1972 Leningrad University student Boris Grebenshchikov founded the band Aquarium, that later grew to huge popularity. Since then the "Piter's rock" music style was formed.

In the 1970s, many bands came out from "underground" and eventually founded the Leningrad rock club which has been providing stage to such bands as Piknik, DDT, Kino, headed by the legendary Viktor Tsoi, Igry, Mify, Zemlyane, Alisa and many other popular groups. The first Russian-style happening show Pop mekhanika, mixing over 300 people and animals on stage, was directed by the multi-talented Sergey Kuryokhin in the 1980s.

Today, St. Petersburg boasts many notable musicians of various genres, from popular Leningrad's Sergei Shnurov and Tequilajazzz, to rock veterans Yuri Shevchuk, Vyacheslav Butusov and Mikhail Boyarsky. The Palace Square was stage for Paul McCartney, Rolling Stones, Scorpions and other stars.

The White Nights Festival in St. Petersburg is famous for spectacular fireworks and massive show celebrating the end of school year: "Scarlet Sails" celebration in St. Petersburg

== Museums and art spaces in Saint Petersburg ==
- Hermitage Museum
- Kuryokhin Center

== Saint Petersburg in the movies ==
Over 250 international and Russian movies were filmed in St. Peterburg. Well over a thousand feature films about tsars, revolution, people and stories set in St. Petersburg were produced worldwide, but were not filmed in the city. First film studios were founded in St. Petersburg in the first decade of the 20th century, and since the 1920s Lenfilm has been the largest film studio based in St. Petersburg. Earliest films that became known internationally were often based on famous literary works set in St. Petersburg, such as Fyodor Dostoevsky's The Idiot and a few versions of Anna Karenina (a Russian and a French film, each of 1911).

The first foreign feature movie filmed entirely in St. Petersburg was the 1997 production of Tolstoy's Anna Karenina, starring Sophie Marceau and Sean Bean, and made by international team of British, American, French and Russian filmmakers. The filming was made at such locations as Palace Embankment, The Winter Palace, Yusupov Palace, Catherine Palace, Petergof, Pavlovsk Palace, Mariinsky Theatre and other famous landmarks and streets of St. Petersburg.

Soviet-made films, such as the trilogy of "Maksim" by director Grigori Kozintsev may show the complex history of St. Petersburg with some propagandistic tone. Many foreign films, such as Nicholas and Alexandra, Rasputin, and Anastasia, are focused on the story of the Tsars. Film Noi vivi, based on the novel We the Living by Ayn Rand, comments on Italian politics by way of featuring the October Revolution. The story of Anastasia is best known by the 1956 version starring Ingrid Bergman and the 1997 cartoon. Russian Ark, filmed entirely in the Hermitage, shows the life of the Tsars and their entourage in the original interiors of the Winter Palace. Der Untergang was also filmed in Petersburg because several buildings on Shkapina Street resembled the center of Berlin of 1945. Leningrad about the Siege of Leningrad was released in 2007, and Giuseppe Tornatore's film on the same theme was planned for release in 2008.

St. Petersburg is a set for Interdevochka (also Интердевочка or Intergirl), featuring impressive shots of the city. The cult comedy Irony of Fate (also Ирония судьбы, или С лёгким паром!) is set in St. Petersburg and pokes fun at Soviet city planning. Other movies include GoldenEye (1995), Midnight in St. Petersburg (UK, 1996). Onegin (1999 featuring Ralph Fiennes, Liv Tyler and Lena Heady) is based on the Pushkin poem and showcases many tourist attractions. The Stroll (2003) by Aleksei Uchitel featured many attractions of the city with Irina Pegova playing the role of a mysterious, well endowed and enchanting Russian beauty. Two Brothers and a Bride (2002), originally titled A Foreign Affair and starring David Arquette, is a comedy about brothers seeking a mail order bride in St. Petersburg and end up finding much more. The popular TV series Master and Margarita was filmed partly in St. Petersburg. Several international film festivals are held annually, such as the International Film Festival in Saint Petersburg, since its inauguration in 1993 during the White Nights.

== St. Petersburg in literature ==
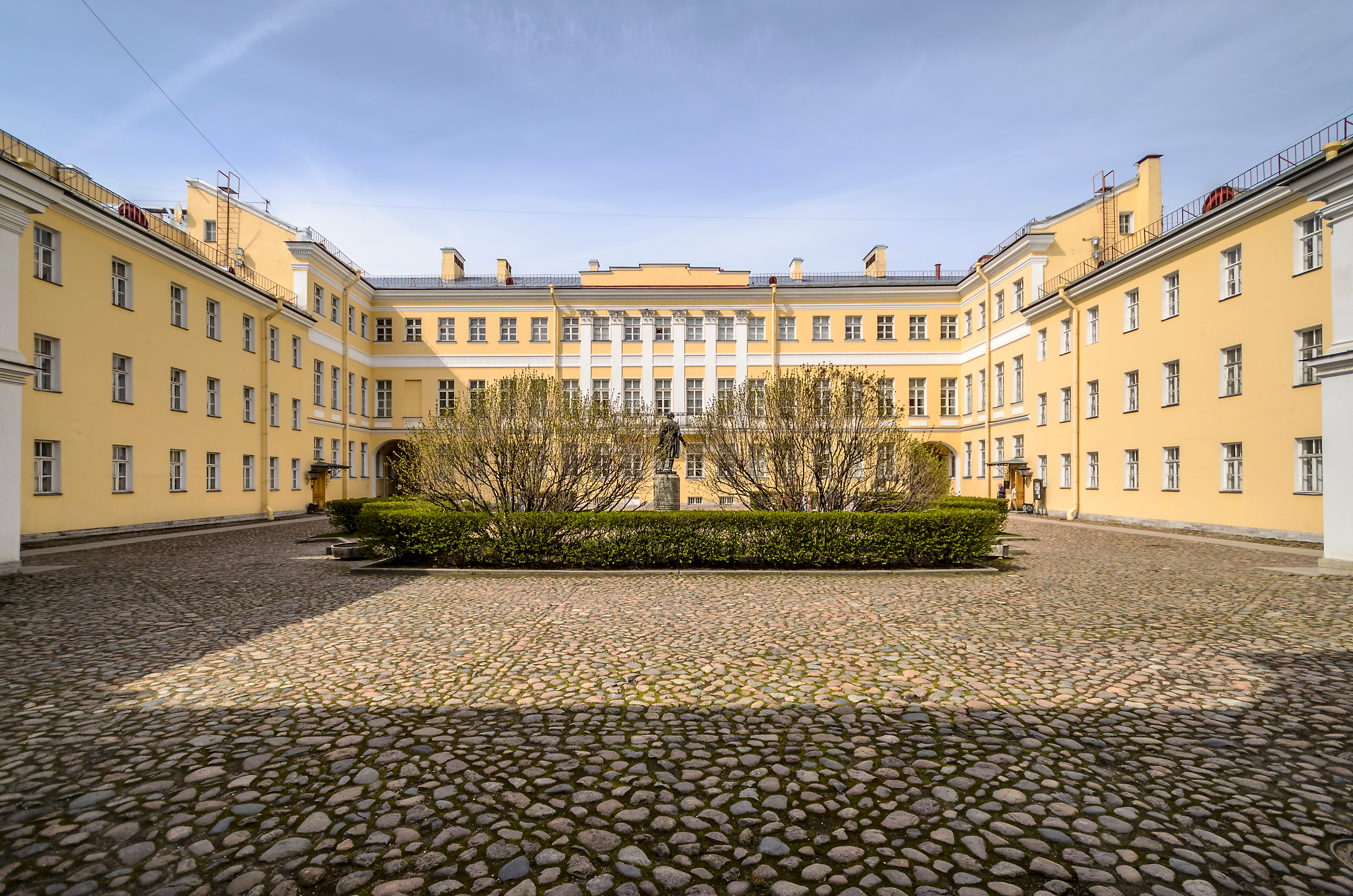
Memorial Pushkin Apartment Museum on 12 Moyka River Embankment

St. Petersburg has a longstanding and world famous tradition in literature. Dostoyevsky called it "The most deliberate city in the world", emphasizing its artificiality, but it was also a symbol of modern disorder in a changing Russia. It frequently appeared to Russian writers as a menacing and inhuman mechanism. The grotesque and often nightmarish image of the city is featured in Pushkin's last poems, the Petersburg stories of Gogol, the novels of Dostoyevsky, the verse of Alexander Blok and Osip Mandelshtam, and in the symbolist novel Petersburg by Andrey Bely. According to Lotman in his chapter, 'The Symbolism of St. Petersburg' in Universe and the Mind, these writers were inspired from symbolism from within the city itself. The themes of water and the conflict between water and stone, interpreted as the conflict between nature and the artificial, and also the theme of theatricality, in which St. Petersburg's building facades and massive boulevards create a stage designed for spectators became important themes for these writers. The effect of life in St. Petersburg on the plight of the poor clerk in a society obsessed with hierarchy and status also became an important theme for authors such as Pushkin, Gogol, and Dostoyevsky. Another important feature of early St. Petersburg literature is its mythical element, which incorporates urban legends and popular ghost stories, as the stories of Pushkin and Gogol included ghosts returning to St. Petersburg to haunt other characters as well as other fantastical elements, creating a surreal and abstract image of St. Petersburg.

20th-century writers from St. Petersburg, such as Vladimir Nabokov, Andrey Bely, Yevgeny Zamyatin with his apprentices Serapion Brothers created entire new styles in literature and contributed new insights in the understanding of society through their experience in this city. Anna Akhmatova became important leader for Russian poetry. Her poem Requiem, focuses on the tragedies of living during the time of the Stalinist terror. Another notable 20th-century writer from St. Petersburg is Joseph Brodsky, recipient of the Nobel Prize in Literature (1987). While living in the United States, his writings in English reflected on life in St. Petersburg from the unique perspective of being both an insider and an outsider to the city in essays such as "A Guide to a Renamed City" and the nostalgic, "In a Room and a Half".

== Sport ==
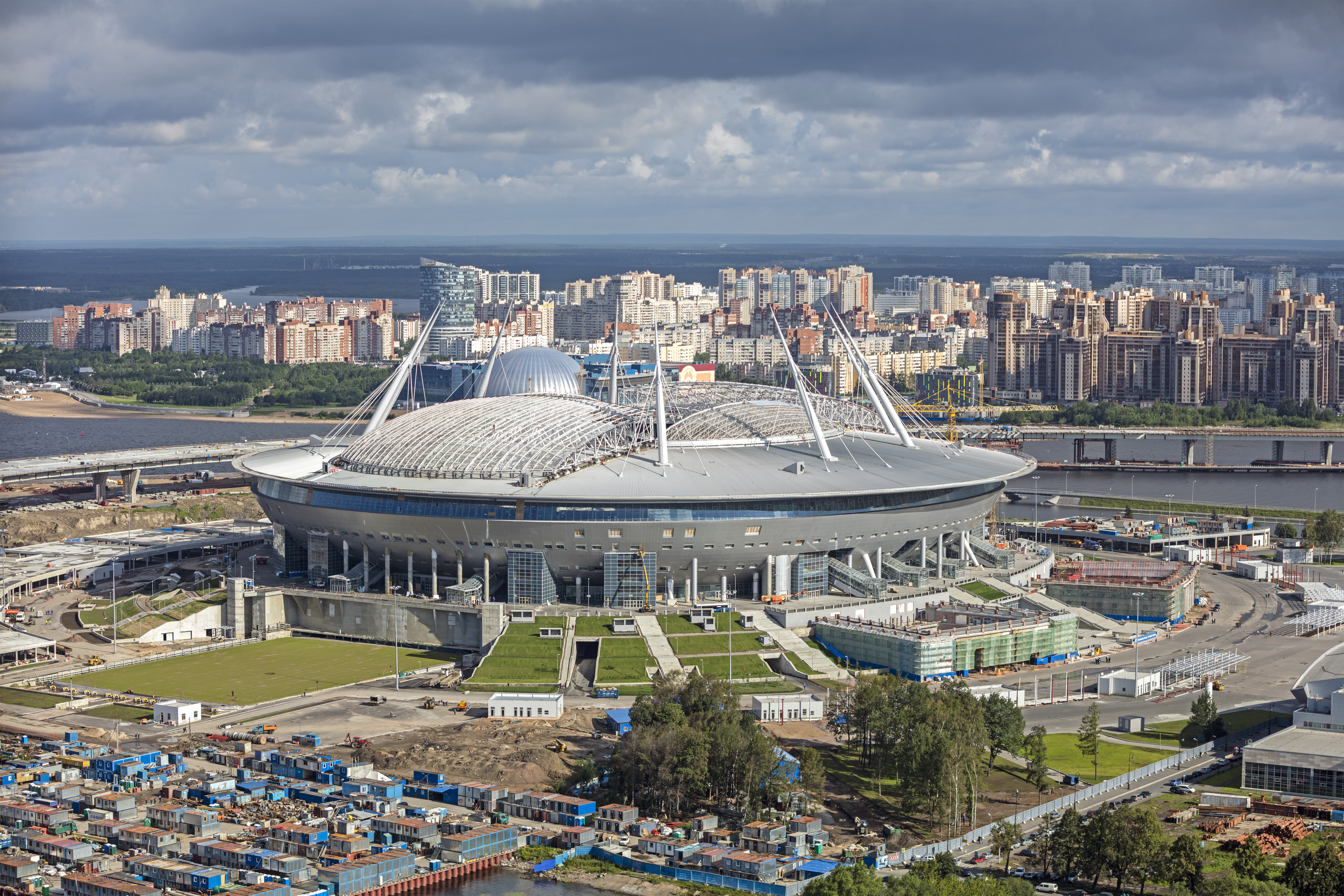
Krestovsky Stadium

St. Petersburg hosted part of the football (soccer) tournament during the 1980 Summer Olympics. The 1994 Goodwill Games were held here.

The first competition here was the 1703 rowing event initiated by Peter the Great, after the victory over the Swedish fleet. Yachting events were held by the Russian Navy since the foundation of the city. Equestrianism has been a long tradition, popular among the Tsars and aristocracy, as well as part of the military training. Several historic sports arenas were built for Equestrianism since the 18th century, to maintain training all year round, such as the Zimny Stadion and Konnogvardeisky Manezh among others.

Chess tradition was highlighted by the 1914 international tournament, in which the title "Grandmaster" was first formally conferred by Russian Tsar Nicholas II to five players: Lasker, Capablanca, Alekhine, Tarrasch and Marshall, and which the Tsar had partially funded.

Kirov Stadium (now demolished) was one of the largest stadiums anywhere in the world, and the home to FC Zenit Saint Petersburg in 1950–1989 and 1992. In 1951 the attendance of 110,000 set the record for the Soviet football. Zenit now plays their home games at Gazprom Arena

== Notable people ==
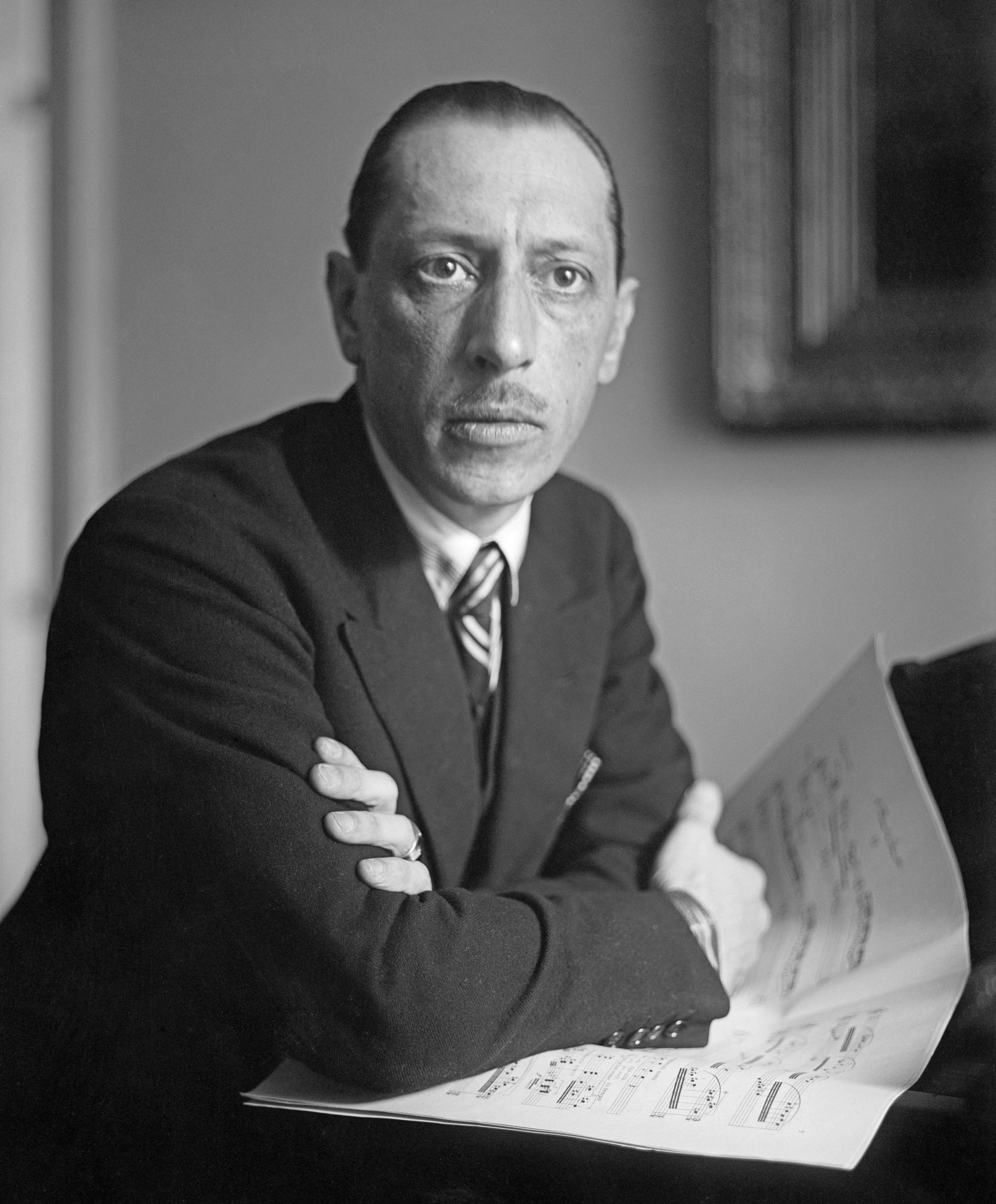
Igor Stravinsky, composer, born in 1882 in a suburb of Saint Petersburg

Many important Russian and international figures, politicians, businessmen, artists, writers and scientists were born and/or have lived in Saint Petersburg. These include many of the Russian emperors; the historic figures Grigori Rasputin, Felix Yusupov, Aleksandr Menshikov, Grigori Alexandrovich Potemkin, Aleksandr Suvorov, Mikhail Kutuzov, Eugene Botkin, Peter Carl Fabergé, and the Stroganovs; the writers Aleksandr Pushkin, Fyodor Dostoyevsky, Nikolay Gogol, Mikhail Saltykov-Shchedrin, Nikolai Leskov, Ayn Rand, Yevgeni Zamyatin, Vladimir Nabokov, Osip Mandelstam, Nikolai Gumilyov, Anna Akhmatova, Ivan Efremov, and Joseph Brodsky; the composers Anton Rubinstein, Aleksandr Borodin, Mikhail Glinka, Sergei Rachmaninoff, Pyotr Ilyich Tchaikovsky, Modest Mussorgsky, Nikolai Rimsky-Korsakov, Igor Stravinsky, Sergei Prokofiev, Dmitri Shostakovich, and Andrei Petrov; the painters Ilya Repin, Ivan Aivazovsky, Arkhip Kuindzhi, Ivan Shishkin, Ivan Kramskoy, Valentin Serov, Mikhail Vrubel, Aleksandr Benois, Kazimir Malevich, Léon Bakst, and Marc Chagall; the scientists Dmitri Mendeleev, Nikolay Semyonov, Pyotr Kapitsa, Yakov Frenkel, Zhores Alferov, Leonid Kantorovich, Mikhail Lomonosov, Ivan Pavlov, Ivan Sechenov, Heinrich Schliemann, Abram Ioffe, and Boris Piotrovsky; businessmen Alfred Nobel, Ludvig Nobel, Emanuel Nobel, Robert Nobel, Nikolay Putilov, and brothers Elisseeff; the cosmonauts Georgi Grechko and Sergei Krikalyov; the ballet dancers Vaslav Nijinsky, Marius Petipa, Anna Pavlova, Tamara Karsavina, Matilda Kshesinskaya, Agrippina Vaganova, George Balanchine, Galina Ulanova, Natalia Dudinskaya, Natalia Makarova, Mikhail Baryshnikov, and Rudolf Nureyev; the entertainers Sergei Diaghilev, Ivan Vsevolozhsky, Feodor Chaliapin, Grigori Kozintsev, Nikolai Cherkasov, Boris Babochkin, Innokenty Smoktunovsky, Georgiy Zhzhonov, Georgy Tovstonogov, Kirill Lavrov, and Alisa Freindlich, the conductors Eduard Nápravník, Alexander Gauk, Alexander Siloti, Yevgeny Mravinsky, Yuri Temirkanov, and Valery Gergiev; the mathematicians Sofia Kovalevskaya, Pafnuty Chebyshev, Leonhard Euler, and Grigori Perelman; and the politicians Vladimir Lenin, Pyotr Stolypin, Alexander Kerensky, Sergei Kirov, Carl Gustaf Emil Mannerheim, Anatoly Sobchak, and Vladimir Putin.

== Education and science ==
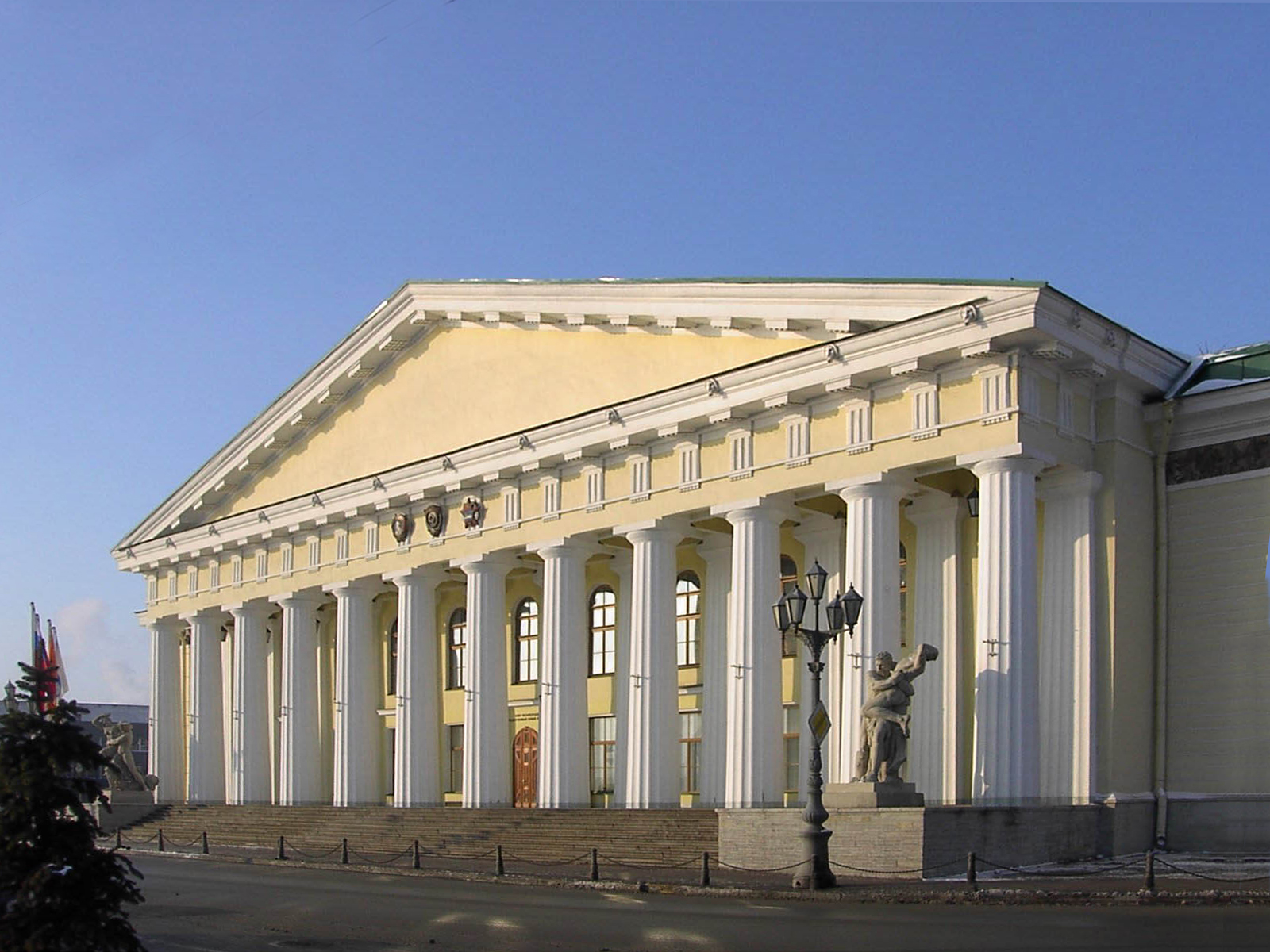
The building of the Mining Academy (1811) is a Neoclassical masterpiece by Andrey Voronikhin.

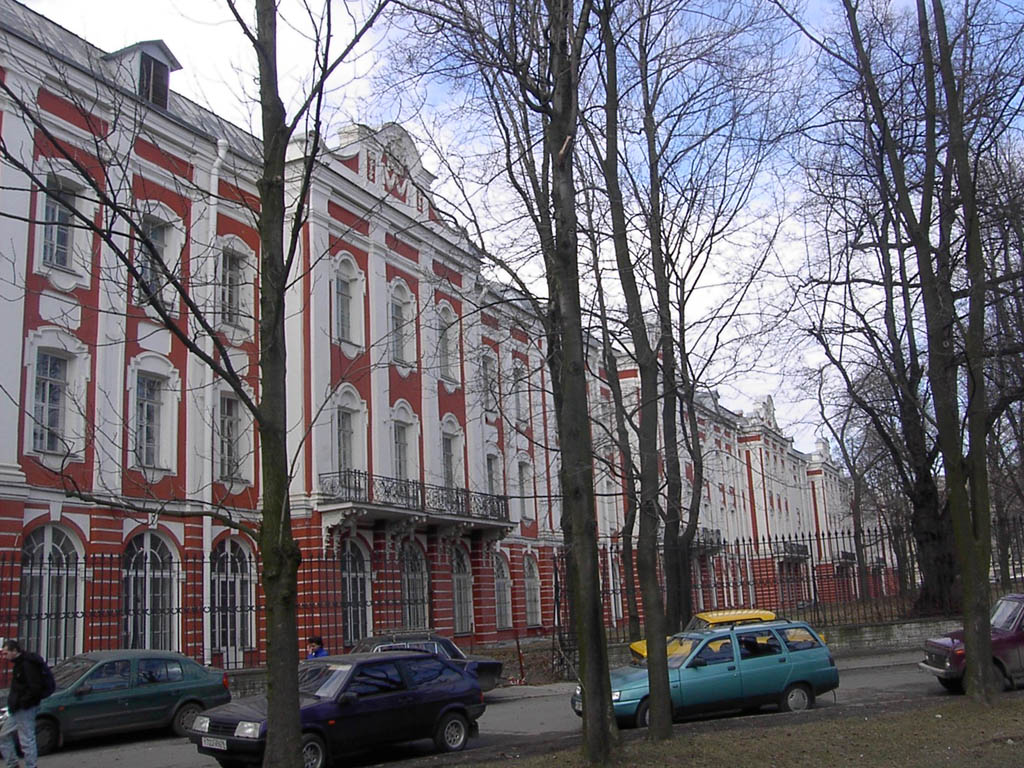
The Twelve Collegia building of St. Petersburg State University

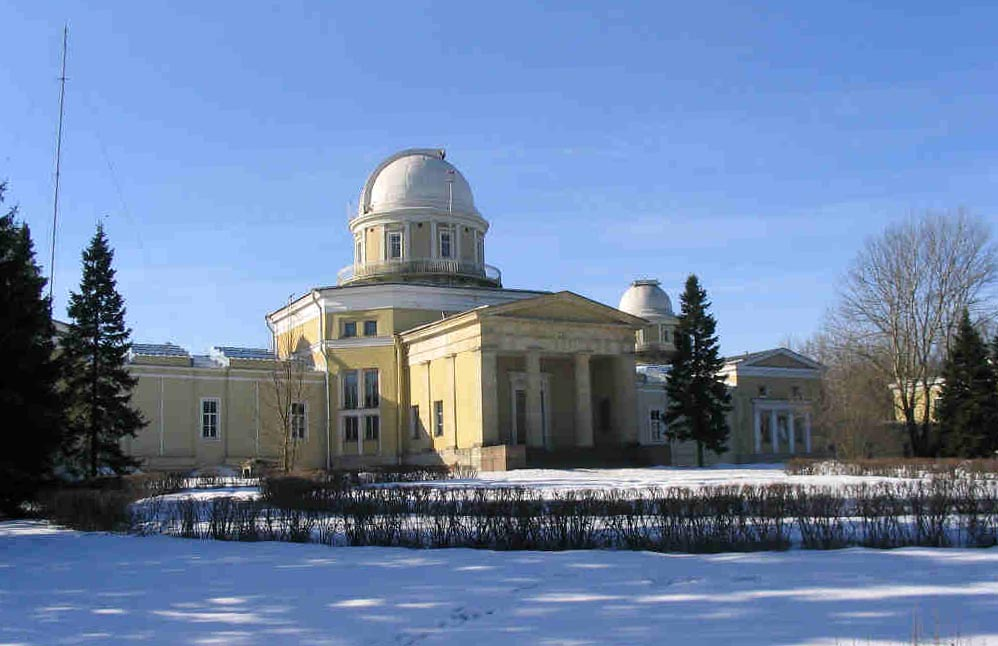
The Pulkovo Observatory

Saint Petersburg has long been a leading center of science and education in Russia.

- Russian Academy of Sciences (1724)
- Saint Petersburg State University (founded 1724)
- Saint Petersburg Naval Academy (founded 18th century)
- Imperial Academy of Arts (founded 1757)
- Vaganova Academy of Russian Ballet
- Saint Petersburg Medical-Surgical Academy (founded 1798)
- Saint Petersburg Mining Institute (Горный институт) (founded 1773)
- Saint Petersburg State Institute of Technology (1828)
- Pulkovo Observatory (1839)
- Ivan Pavlov's Medical Academy and research center. (founded 1880s)
- Saint Petersburg Conservatory (1862)
- Alexander Military Law Academy (founded 1867)
- Saint Petersburg State Electrotechnical University (1886)
- Saint Petersburg Polytechnical University (1899)
- State Marine Technical University (Корабелка) (1899)
- Saint Petersburg State University of Information Technologies, Mechanics and Optics (1900)
- Saint Petersburg State University of Engineering and Economics (1906)
- St. Petersburg State Medical Academy (1907)
- Saint Petersburg State Technical University of Telecommunications
- Saint Petersburg Pharmaceutical Academy
- Saint Petersburg Academy of Pediatrics and Maternity (founded 1900)
- Saint Petersburg Theatre Academy (former Tenishev's College) (1899)
- Saint Petersburg Academy of Film and Television
- Russian State University of Pedagogy (Herzen University) (1797)
- St. Petersburg State University of Culture and Arts (1918)
- Saint Petersburg State University of Economics and Finance (Финэк) (1930)
- Baltic State Technical University ("ВОЕНМЕХ") (1932)
- St. Petersburg Aerospace University (Mozhaysky University)
- Smolny College (1999)
