= Eliasberg =

Eliasberg is a Jewish and Yiddish surname. It may refer to:

- Karl Eliasberg (1907–1978), Belarusian-Russian conductor and violinist
- Judah Bezalel Eliasberg (1800–1847), Russian Hebrew writer and translator
- Louis E. Eliasberg (1896–1976), American financier and numismatist
- Jan Eliasberg (born 1954), American film, theatre, and television director, writer, and producer
