= The War Symphonies: Shostakovich Against Stalin =

- Directed by: Larry Weinstein
- Screenplay by: David New; Larry Weinstein; Gemma Van Zeventer
- Produced by: Niv Fichman
- Starring: Valery Gergiev; Graham Haley; Netherlands Radio Philharmonic Orchestra; Kirov Orchestra
- Cinematography: Horst Zeidler
- Music by: Dmitri Shostakovich
- Production company: Rhombus Media
- Distributed by: Bullfrog Films
- Release date: 1997

The War Symphonies: Shostakovich Against Stalin (sometimes titled Shostakovich Against Stalin: The War Symphonies) is a 1997 documentary film about Soviet composer Dmitri Shostakovich. It focuses on the period between 1936 and 1945, during which Shostakovich composed his Fourth, Fifth, Sixth, Seventh, Eighth, and Ninth Symphonies, but also briefly discusses other works in the composer's oeuvre, such as his Lady Macbeth of the Mtsensk District.

== Production ==
The film adopts the revisionist view of Shostakovich put forward by Solomon Volkov in his book Testimony (which is quoted extensively in the film without attribution). This view holds that Shostakovich was strongly opposed to the leadership of Josef Stalin, and that he included anti-government messages in his compositions under the Soviet regime. However, the extent to which this interpretation of his music is true is a subject of debate among musicologists.

The work is narrated by Graham Haley as the voice of Shostakovich. The War Symphonies was filmed in Russia and highlights performances of Shostakovich's symphonies by the Netherlands Radio Philharmonic Orchestra and the Kirov Orchestra, both conducted by Valery Gergiev. Gergiev is also interviewed, as are several of Shostakovich's contemporaries; "one of the most moving accounts" in the film is from an attendee of the Leningrad première of the Seventh Symphony during the Siege of Leningrad. The list of interviewees has considerable overlap with those quoted in Elizabeth Wilson's Shostakovich: A Life Remembered, published two years before the film's production; Weinstein drew heavily on this revisionist work in his scripting. Extensive archival footage from the Soviet era is combined with contemporary cinematography, and "the editing together of music, image, and voice-over is often masterly".

The War Symphonies was rereleased by Philips as a DVD in 2005.

== Reception ==
Musicologist Ian Macdonald, an adherent of the revisionist viewpoint, noted that "those diehards who refuse to admit Shostakovich's moral anti-communism, or even that his music is anything but purely abstract, may well squirm at Weinstein's approach. Let them. Their seemingly incurable historical ignorance is the cause of their discomfort: they deserve to be annoyed by this programme". Anti-revisionist Royal Brown, on the other hand, suggested that "the composer himself would have been horrified at the mickey-mousings to which some of his music is subjected".

John McCannon noted the film's "slight (if understandable) tendency to over-identify with its subject" but praised its "considerable emotional power, as well as a piquant sense of irony". Brad Eden recommended the work for screening in university musicology and history courses, lauding its "intense historical perspective". David Haas criticized the narrator of the film as an unrealistic portrayal of Shostakovich but commended the "technical ingenuity and artistry of the film's editing".

=== Awards ===
- International Emmy Award for Best Arts Documentary
- American Historical Association Film of the Year
- Gemini Award for Best Performing Arts Program
