= American premieres of Dmitri Shostakovich's Symphony No. 7 =

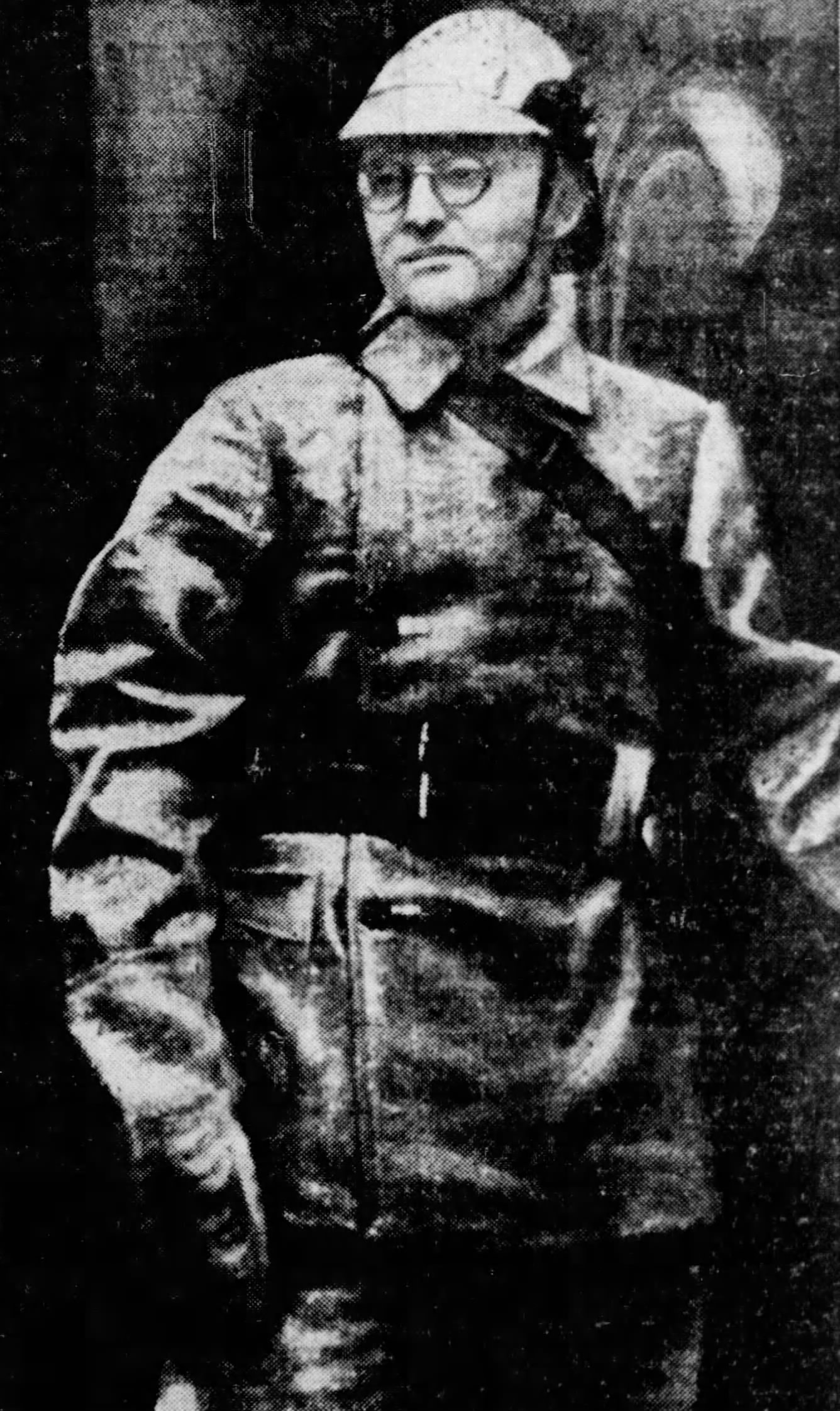
Shostakovich in his firefighting uniform in 1941

The American broadcast premiere of Dmitri Shostakovich's Symphony No. 7 was performed by the NBC Symphony Orchestra conducted by Arturo Toscanini on July 19, 1942. This was followed by the American concert premiere played at Tanglewood by the Berkshire Music Center Orchestra, a student ensemble, conducted by Serge Koussevitzky on August 16.

Shostakovich's music had been well known in the United States since the local premiere of his Symphony No. 1 in 1928. His opera Lady Macbeth of Mtsensk District was celebrated and criticized upon its American premiere in 1935; the fallout from its censure by Soviet authorities in 1936 was reported on across the country. The fortunes of his Symphony No. 5 and resulting political rehabilitation were also extensively covered in the press.

The Symphony No. 7 was completed on December 27, 1941, followed by the first American news reports about it in January 1942. Its origins in the siege of Leningrad, during which Shostakovich briefly worked in a local firefighting brigade, generated levels of public interest and press coverage considered unusually high for a modern musical composition. Leopold Stokowski and Toscanini, co-music directors of the NBC Symphony Orchestra, competed for the first broadcast rights to the symphony, which were ultimately won by the latter. Koussevitzky was granted the right to conduct the first performance in concert.

Prolonged standing ovations met the premieres of the symphony, which went on to become exceptionally popular with American audiences during World War II, and was briefly considered as the basis for a Hollywood film. Critics, including Olin Downes and Nicholas Nabokov, were divided. Béla Bartók, who had listened to its premiere, disliked it to the point that he satirized it in his Concerto for Orchestra. The symphony also had its defenders, including Koussevitzky and Carl Sandburg, who celebrated the symphony in a nationally syndicated open letter.

== Background ==
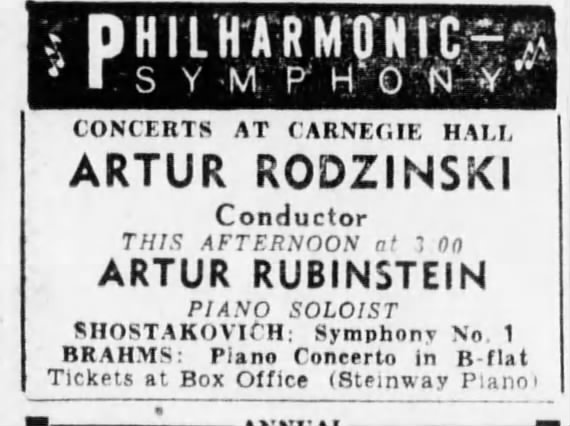
The live CBS broadcast of Shostakovich's First Symphony conducted by Artur Rodziński on December 7, 1941, was interrupted by breaking news of the attack on Pearl Harbor.

=== Shostakovich's reception in the United States, 1928–1941 ===
The music of Dmitri Shostakovich was familiar to audiences in the United States by 1942. In 1928, the Philadelphia Orchestra conducted by Leopold Stokowski played the American premiere of his Symphony No. 1 to great success. Over the next decade, Shostakovich's music was widely performed and discussed in the United States.

Artur Rodziński conducted the American premiere of Shostakovich's Lady Macbeth of Mtsensk District with the Cleveland Orchestra in 1935. He called it "one of the most important contributions to music brought out in the past 25 years." The Associated Press reported that after the same forces performed it at the Metropolitan Opera later that year, the audience "cheered and shouted and applauded beyond anything seen lately". An article published in Musical America and the Brooklyn Daily Eagle said that not since Alban Berg's Wozzeck had a "modern opera been so much talked about."

The composer's 1936 censure by Soviet authorities was reported on across the country; including by the Associated Press, Time, The New York Times, The Baltimore Sun, Deseret News, Oregon Statesman, and in nationally syndicated columns by Bruce Catton and Chester Harvey Rowell. The world and American premieres of his Symphony No. 5, as well as his subsequent political rehabilitation, also received national media attention.

On December 7, 1941, a performance of Shostakovich's Symphony No. 1 played by the New York Philharmonic-Symphony Orchestra conducted by Rodziński for a live CBS national radio broadcast was interrupted by a breaking news announcement of the Empire of Japan's attack on Pearl Harbor.

=== Origins of the Symphony No. 7 ===
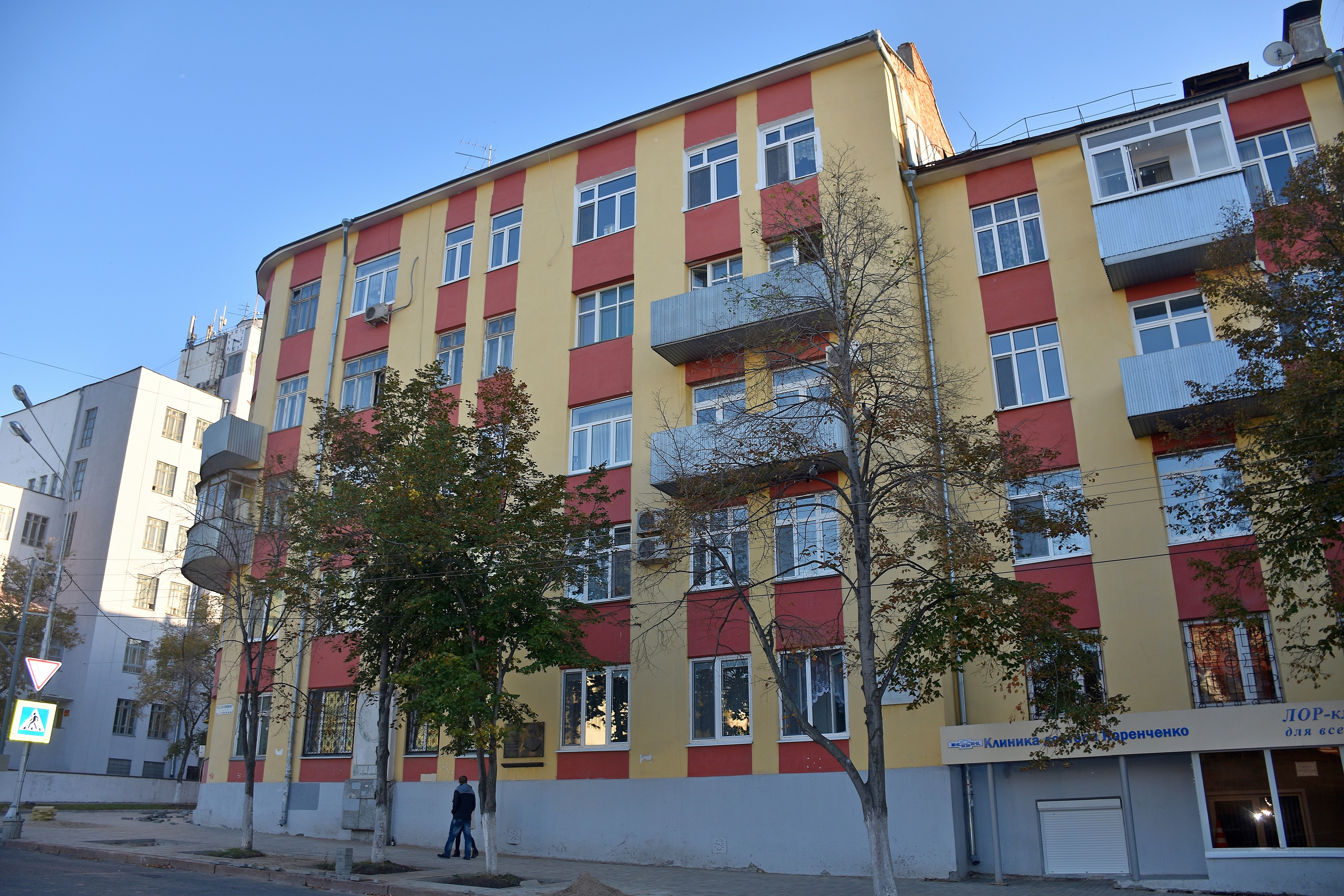
The apartment building in Kuybyshev where Shostakovich completed his Symphony No. 7 (pictured in 2015)

On the evening of June 22, 1941, Shostakovich and his friend Isaak Glikman had intended to see a double-header soccer match in Leningrad, then have dinner. As they commuted to the stadium, they heard Vyacheslav Molotov's radio announcement that Germany had invaded the Soviet Union. Shostakovich immediately went to volunteer with the Red Army and the recently formed People's Militia, but was rejected by both. In July, he was accepted into a regiment of volunteers from the Leningrad Conservatory that erected defenses along the perimeter of the city. That same month, he was requisitioned into a brigade of local firefighters tasked with protecting the Conservatory's roof against incendiary bombs. Although he was photographed on July 29 in a firefighting uniform, he never did any work in the brigade. Near the war's end, he learned that Conservatory officials had surreptitiously prevented him from doing work that could cause him physical harm. On October 1, Shostakovich and his family were evacuated first to Moscow, then on October 15 to Kuybyshev.

On July 19, Shostakovich started composing his Symphony No. 7. He completed the symphony on December 27 and spent the following hours making corrections, amending the orchestration, as well as adding dynamics, phrasing, and expressive markings. At a party later that day, he announced to his guests that the symphony was finished and played a piano reduction of the symphony. At a subsequent performance at his home, he played the symphony again, this time in a piano four-hands arrangement with Lev Oborin. Among his guests were harpist Vera Dulova and conductor Alexander Melik-Pashayev, the latter of whom hoped to premiere the symphony. In the middle of the performance, the conductor Samuil Samosud, who lived one floor down, called Shostakovich's apartment to say he had been hearing the music through his ceiling and asked if he could come upstairs. Upon doing so, he was immediately captivated by the music, and said he would begin rehearsals as soon as possible with the Bolshoi Theatre Orchestra, which had also been evacuated to Kuybyshev.

Shostakovich did not object to the interpretation by his friends and colleagues that his newest symphony was about the war. Film director Alexei Kapler, who was among the first people to hear Shostakovich play the symphony, recalled:

There was a piano, a few chairs, a bed. Bare walls. He played sitting on the edge of his chair; thin, his shoulders sticking out, in suspenders, with a tuft of hair popping out of his head. He looked remarkably like a teacher's pet, a high school student sitting in the front row of his class. Outside the snow was falling... the war was rumbling on—terrible and great... the thunder of catastrophe was heard here, the wind of victory flew here...

On March 5, 1942, the Symphony No. 7 was premiered in Kuybyshev by the Bolshoi Theatre Orchestra conducted by Samosud; an occasion of unrivaled political and professional importance for Shostakovich. The performance was broadcast across the Soviet Union. According to Laurel Fay, the symphony became a potent national symbol of "just cause and steely resolve in the war against fascism" and an "instantaneous cultural icon unprecedented for a serious symphonic work" virtually overnight. Victor Seroff, whose biography of Shostakovich was published in 1943, said that Russians considered him a national hero equivalent to Charles Lindbergh in the United States.

== The Seventh in America ==
=== Press coverage ===
The first American press report of the Symphony No. 7 emerged from the Romanul American on January 3, 1942, a Romanian-language newspaper, which stated that Shostakovich had recently composed a symphony "dedicated to the defenders of Leningrad"; on January 24, the St. Louis Post-Dispatch mentioned it in an article about the siege. On February 6, the Embassy of the Soviet Union in the United States issued a press release confirming that the symphony was completed and was being premiered imminently. This was followed by more extensive reports on February 7, which included Shostakovich's remarks that the symphony was "devoted to the events of 1941—war." On March 2, the Associated Press reported on one of the three dress rehearsals for the symphony's premiere that had occurred at noon the day before. (Note: The Associated Press incorrectly states that the March 1 performance was the premiere. Sofia Khentova said the premiere occurred on March 5, but had been preceded by three dress rehearsals, two of which had been set aside for invited Red Army personnel stationed in Kuybyshev.)

The New York Times published an extensive article on Shostakovich and his Symphony No. 7 on April 5. Ralph Parker, the newspaper's Moscow correspondent, had interviewed the composer shortly after the symphony's completion, and attended the rehearsals for the premiere:

[Shostakovich's] Seventh Symphony opens a new phase in the young Soviet composer's development ... It was the heroic stature that the ordinary man gained in Leningrad, where between August 18 and September 13 last year, the first three parts of the symphony were written that the composer glorifies. There is no doubt that the suffering and heroism of the Soviet people as well as their indomitable spirit and unbounding confidence in ultimate victory has evoked a response in the composer's heart. It is a work conceived, as the composer tells, under the influence of events when Leningrad's workers manned barricades ... and soldiers fought ... and it is completely free of resignation and immensely compelling ... Like all who have seen Leningrad under siege, he has unlimited admiration for the common man's steadfastness and heroic potentialities.

The Seventh Symphony was variously nicknamed by the American press as the "War", "Blitz", "Stalingrad", and "The Symphony of Our Times". Most of the reporting explored the programmatic aspects of the music, as well as the background of its creation. A story disseminated by the Wide World News Service referred to the work as "Shostakovich's Seventh and most important symphony—ninety minutes [sic] of music composed literally under the fire of German guns." A column in the Paterson Morning Call ended with an invocation pleading for Shostakovich's continued safety, "so that he may have an opportunity to complete his message to the musical world."

Shostakovich was also frequently compared to Ludwig van Beethoven, including by the Miami Herald, which added that his music was "well loved in America" and that his music would "live through the ages".

The event that catapulted Shostakovich to a level of international fame unmatched by any other 20th-century composer occurred the week before the American premiere when he was the cover story of the July 20 issue of Time. His likeness appeared on it in a firefighter's uniform against a background of a city on fire painted by Boris Artzybasheff. The image was captioned: "Fireman Shostakovich—Amid bombs bursting in Leningrad he heard the chords of victory." Artzybasheff's illustration was based on a photo of Shostakovich in a firefighter's uniform that had previously been published in Time on February 16; it also later appeared in the August 3 issue of Life. The story, as with others in Time during that period, did not have a byline; the chief music writer for the magazine at the time of publication was Winthrop Sargeant. It related the biography of Shostakovich, the creation of his Symphony No. 7 amidst the ongoing war, the score's shipment to the United States, and the resulting "battle royale" between the country's most prominent conductors for the rights to the "glory of conducting the [American] premiere". The article also noted that "not since the first Manhattan performance of Parsifal [in 1903] had there been such a buzz of American anticipation over a piece of music."

Olin Downes, music critic of The New York Times, was among the few who offered a more measured assessment of Shostakovich and the forthcoming American premiere of his new symphony. He called the comparisons to Beethoven "premature" and "disproportionate", criticized what he considered was the tendency to bombast and derivativeness in Shostakovich, and attributed his contemporary fame to "confused and desperate" wartime priorities. Nevertheless, Downes ranked him along with Jean Sibelius as a composer capable of composing a "sustained, serene, grandly proportioned slow movement", and called him a "young man, of striking achievements" who was "already a leading figure in modern music."

Music historian Christopher H. Gibbs said that much of the information about the symphony disseminated by the American press, including from The New York Times and Time, had come from Soviet sources translated into English. He characterized contemporary American press coverage as being "largely repetitive" and that it "sometimes bordered on plagiarism". Musicologist Richard Taruskin described it as a "great fever of war-hysterical publicity".

=== From Kuybyshev to New York City ===
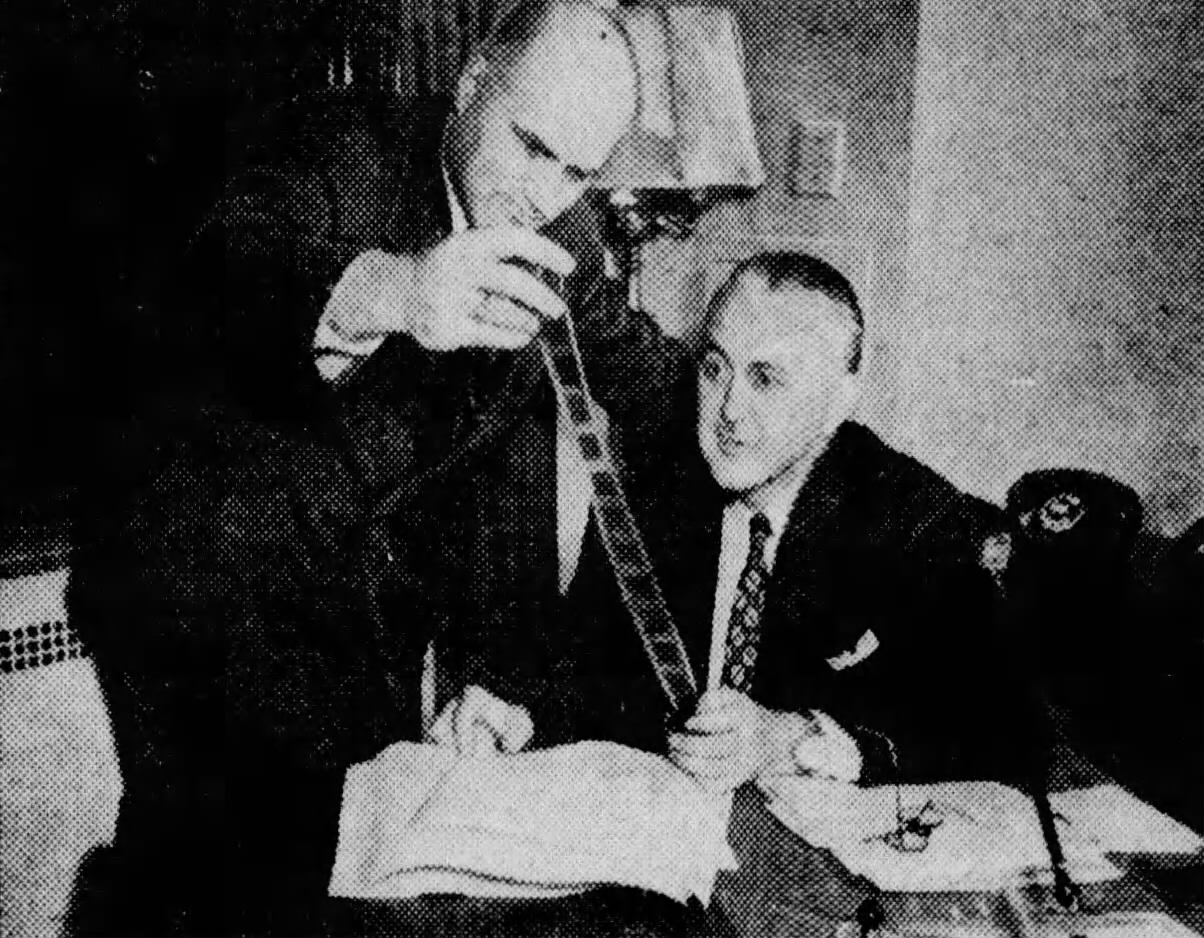
NBC staff examining the microfilm containing the score to the Seventh

After the symphony's world premiere in Kuybyshev, the score was copied onto a 100 ft (30 m) scroll of 35 mm microfilm, loaded into a canister, then shipped by plane from the Soviet Union to Tehran on April 9, 1942. From there it was transported by car to Cairo and sent by air where it was eventually received by the Am-Rus Music Corporation in New York City, where it arrived in late June. Before reaching its final destination, it first stopped in London, where it was copied for the British premiere on June 22 by the London Symphony Orchestra conducted by Sir Henry Wood.

When the score arrived in America, local music copyists had to contend with several challenges. They found that the images preserved on the microfilm were underexposed. Wartime shortages also made it impossible to find enough dull-finish paper to print all 2,038 sheets of score and parts for the American premiere performance. Instead, they had to photocopy them onto glossy paper, which could result in glare for musicians reading the parts in studio conditions. Aside from the orchestral parts, ten copies of the score were made and distributed to selected conductors in the United States.

== Negotiations for the premieres ==
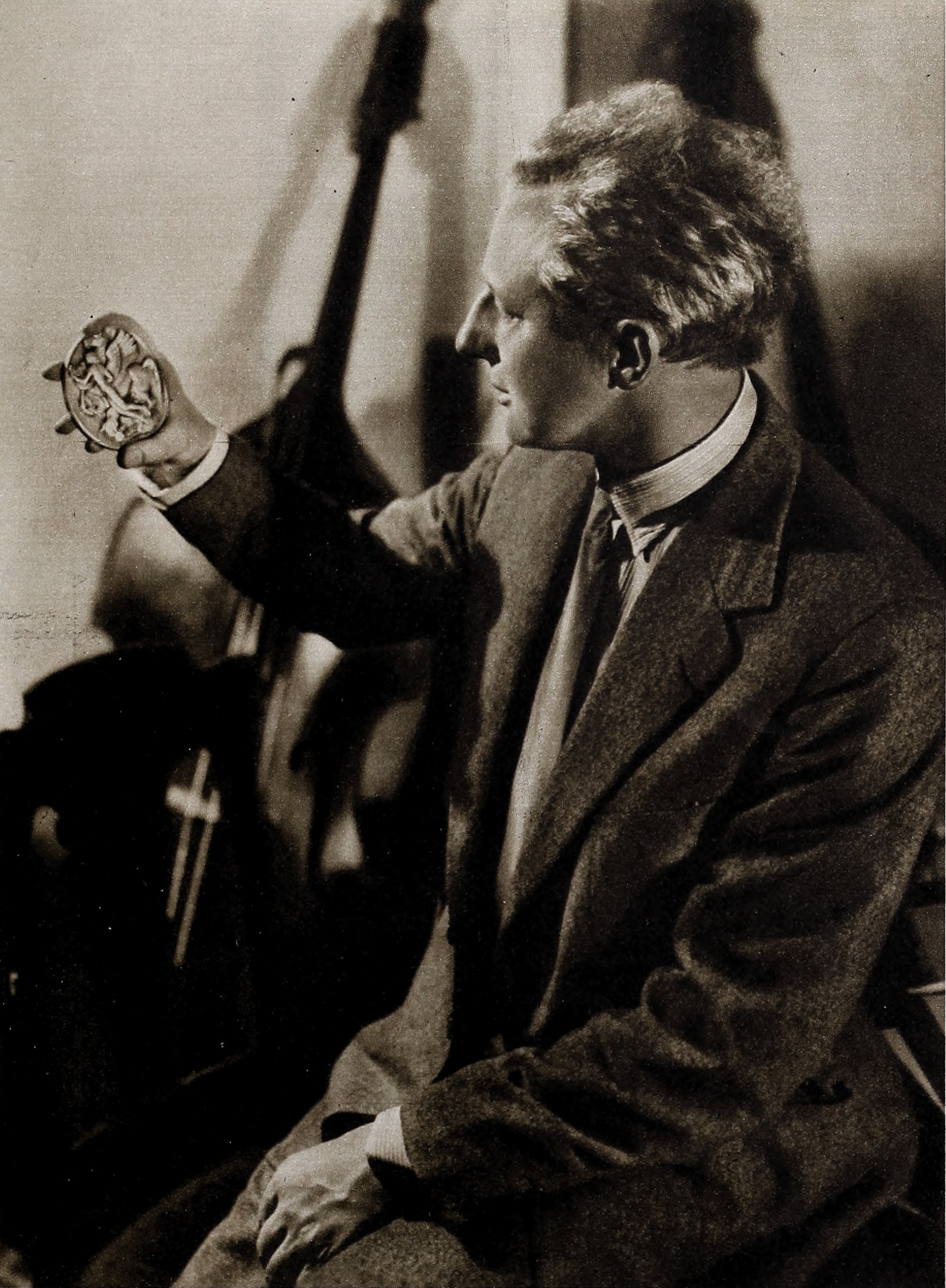
Leopold Stokowski urged NBC in December 1941 to acquire the first American performance rights.

=== Rivalry ===
In 1942, Stokowski and Arturo Toscanini were co-music directors of the NBC Symphony Orchestra. The arrangement had resulted after the latter announced that he was going to retire following the 1941–1942 season, despite that he never seriously considered doing so. Aside from enjoying a salary and relaxed schedule that could not be matched by any other orchestra, he was also riding the peak of his fame as a "celebrity icon", a phenomenon which Joseph Horowitz described as the "Toscanini cult". NBC, nevertheless, engaged Stokowski as a safeguard, whose recordings of orchestral music outsold those by other conductors at the time.

Toscanini was frequently criticized in the press for his lack of interest in modern music, repertoire which Stokowski enjoyed and vigorously promoted throughout his career. After clashing on programming at NBC, the conductors reached a mutual compromise that suited their respective interests, wherein Stokowski would conduct modern music and Toscanini the classics.

The relationship between Stokowski and Toscanini had in earlier years been mutually cordial, but turned tense after a two-week exchange of podiums in 1930 when they were respectively the music directors of the Philadelphia Orchestra and the New York Philharmonic-Symphony Orchestra. Shortly before the exchange, Stokowski had written admiringly of Toscanini, saying that he had been "moved with the beauty and magnificence" of his conducting. The latter did not reciprocate the gesture; instead he called his colleague a "charlatan". Their approaches to music, performance, and programming were highly divergent. Toscanini complained to David Sarnoff, founder and president of NBC, that Stokowski was "ruining" the NBC Symphony Orchestra with his seating arrangements and use of free bowing. In October 1941, Toscanini drafted, but never sent, a letter to Stokowski wherein he rebuked his "brutal, bestial, ignobil [sic], unmusical performance" of César Franck's Symphony in D minor, and for being a "ganster [sic] like Hitler and Mussolini". Oliver Daniel described Toscanini as being "obsessed" with Stokowski and that he behaved with him "like a medieval Tuscan pursuing a vendetta".

=== Clash over premiere ===
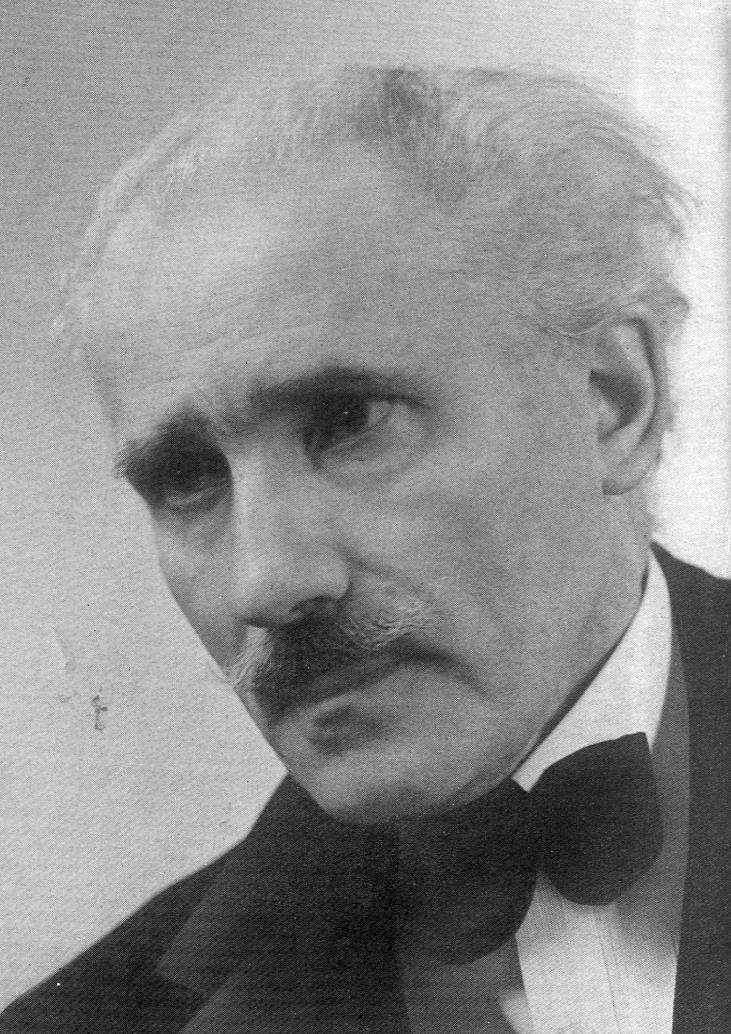
Arturo Toscanini used his influence and personal appeal to Shostakovich to gain the rights for the premiere.

Stokowski met Shostakovich while traveling in the Soviet Union in 1929. Aside from premiering Shostakovich's First Symphony, he had also conducted the American premieres of the Third and Sixth Symphonies, the Piano Concerto No. 1, and had made an orchestral arrangement of the Prelude No. 14 in E♭ minor from the 24 Preludes. In December 1941, he pressed NBC to acquire the rights to the American premiere of the Seventh Symphony.

Prior to 1942, the only music by Shostakovich in Toscanini's repertoire had been the First Symphony, which he performed in New York City and Vienna; he declined to conduct the American premiere of the Fifth citing his indifference to it. The publicity surrounding the Seventh Symphony attracted him, however, and despite being aware of Stokowski's expectation that he would conduct the American premiere, urged NBC to cede the rights to him instead. He also personally appealed to Shostakovich via telegram for the privilege of the premiere, who immediately expressed his preference for Toscanini.

Upon hearing of this turn of events, Stokowski was furious and sent a letter to Toscanini asking him to return the premiere rights to him. The latter replied that although he did not share Stokowski's "frenzied love" for the music of Shostakovich, the Seventh's anti-fascist symbolism kindled his intense desire to premiere it:

Happily, you are much younger than me, and Shostakovich will not stop writing new symphonies. You will certainly have all the opportunities you like to perform them ... Be sure you will never again find me in your way.

NBC also successfully lobbied Am-Rus Music Corporation on Toscanini's behalf to ensure that his subsequent concert performance of the Seventh would precede any by Stokowski.

On the date of the Seventh Symphony's premiere, Stokowski joined Albert Coates in listening to it at a party honoring Shostakovich hosted by NBC staff and the Soviet vice-consul in Los Angeles. He later conducted the NBC Symphony Orchestra's second performance of the Seventh.

=== Other conductors ===
Rodziński and Serge Koussevitzky had both also been interested in conducting the Seventh's premiere. Am-Rus Music Corporation granted the rights to the first concert performance to the latter.

== Premieres ==
=== Studio 8H ===
The American broadcast premiere occurred before an invited audience at Studio 8H on July 19, 1942, with the NBC Symphony Orchestra conducted by Toscanini. He received a photocopy of the score on June 14 and memorized it in three days. In order to facilitate study, he made reductions of portions of the score. Initially, he had to improvise his own tempi during the first rehearsals as any markings indicating these were missing in his copy. He telegrammed Shostakovich, who replied with detailed instructions for tempi and overall timing.

The broadcast, which was introduced by Ben Grauer, was relayed to Latin America later that same day and again on July 20. Shostakovich and Toscanini exchanged greetings via telegram before the performance. Proceeds went to Russian War Relief, whose president, Edward Clark Carter, made a speech during the broadcast. Members of the audience included Max Reinhardt and H. V. Kaltenborn.

=== Tanglewood ===
Following this was the concert premiere of the Seventh on August 14 at the Berkshire Music Shed in Tanglewood, played by the Berkshire Music Center Orchestra, a student ensemble, conducted by Koussevitzky. In the audience were Soviet Ambassador Maxim Litvinov and Princess Juliana of the Netherlands.

=== Commercial recording ===
On December 4, 1946, the Buffalo Philharmonic Orchestra conducted by William Steinberg made the first commercial recording of the Seventh.

== Reception ==
=== Popularity ===
Audiences reacted with prolonged standing ovations at the Seventh's first American performances at Studio 8H and Tanglewood. Popular demand was such that the symphony was played 37 times by American orchestras in the last half of 1942; three different orchestras played it in New York City alone during that period. Hundreds of performances in the Western hemisphere followed. Oscar Thompson, music critic of the New York Sun, observed at the time that "conductors seem determined to play the Shostakovich Seventh Symphony to death".

=== Media ===
Louella Parsons reported on July 19 that a film adaptation based on the Seventh Symphony was being considered. She said Stokowski and Dmitri Tiomkin would be in charge of musical direction and arrangements respectively, and that Kapler would direct.

On August 5, Carl Sandburg published an open letter that was syndicated nationally in praise of Shostakovich and his Seventh, wherein he celebrated "Russia in blood and shadows" and its "great singing people beyond defeat or conquest".

=== Criticism ===
Critical reaction to the Seventh's premieres were mixed in their appraisals. Douglas Watt in the New York Daily News called the march theme from the Seventh's first movement a "crazy little tune" that he likened to Fats Waller's song "Ain't Misbehavin'", and described its emergence as a "sneak attack". The Boston Globe said the symphony had a "'chin up—we'll win' quality" that was the work of an "artist of extraordinary selective powers", but left questions about its ultimate aesthetic worth to be answered by the "subtle, but definite wear of time".

B. H. Haggin in The Nation labeled the Seventh "derivative", "eclectic", and said it was "pretentious in style as in length; and what it says so pretentiously is feeble, inane, banal". Downes wrote in The New York Times that the Seventh was "far from a work of sustained greatness, either of ideas, workmanship, or taste". Nicholas Nabokov in Harper's Magazine said that despite the Seventh's "profoundly moving sincerity", it was "definitely not the great symphonic work we were prepared to expect".

Koussevitzky defended Shostakovich and his Seventh in the press, saying that critics would "strongly regret [their words] in the future". He also said that true appreciation of music by a man "who is without a doubt a genius" required repeated listening:

It is my deepest feeling that there never has been a composer since Beethoven with such tremendous appeal to the masses. No one since Beethoven has had the aesthetic sense, the approach to musical material that Shostakovich has. He is the greatest master of musical wealth; he is the master of what he desires to do; he has melody without end; his language is as rich as the world; his emotion is absolutely universal.

==== Shostakovich ====
After Toscanini's premiere, the New York Philharmonic-Symphony Orchestra offered Shostakovich an eight-concert conducting engagement. He declined on account of his inexperience as a conductor, but told Glikman that he regretted his decision after hearing Konstantin Ivanov conduct the Seventh Symphony, which led him "to the conclusion that the art of conducting can't be as difficult as all that". The New York Philharmonic-Symphony Orchestra countered with an offer to engage Shostakovich as a pianist, but he again refused. A member of its board independently asked Wendell Willkie to intercede with Stalin on the orchestra's behalf, but before he could do so the orchestra publicly announced Shostakovich's refusal to come to New York City.

Shostakovich heard Toscanini's broadcast premiere of the Seventh on April 23, 1943, and sent the conductor a congratulatory telegram expressing his gratitude for the performance.

Negative comments about Toscanini's conducting were attributed to Shostakovich by Solomon Volkov in his book Testimony. In the May 1991 issue of Gramophone, Maxim Shostakovich said Testimony was "about my father, not by him", and listed the appraisal of Toscanini as one of the subjects in which the book was not being truthful. According to Sofia Khentova, the composer conceded that the NBC Symphony Orchestra did not have the technical polish of the Philadelphia or Boston Symphony Orchestras, but chose Toscanini because he admired his "genius" and "moral greatness".

==== Toscanini ====
On July 24, Toscanini received a congratulatory telegram from Samosud for his performance, who called him the "glorious patriarch" of conductors. Toscanini conducted the Seventh only once more, in October 1942 with the New York Philharmonic-Symphony Orchestra at Carnegie Hall. According to George R. Marek, Toscanini heard his performance of the symphony years later and asked, "Did I really learn and conduct such junk?" On another occasion, he heard Steinberg's recording and asked a similar rhetorical question, but upon hearing his own recording said that he liked the music again.

== Legacy ==
=== Recordings ===
The broadcast recording of Toscanini's premiere performance was not issued commercially until 1967, when it was included in an RCA Victor set commemorating the centennial of the conductor's birth. Stokowski's December 13, 1942, performance with the NBC Symphony Orchestra was also recorded for broadcast. It was first issued commercially in 1993 on a compact disc set of the conductor's early recordings of Shostakovich's music. Robert Cowan called Toscanini's recording one of his "most controversial and exciting"; he praised it along with Stokowski's "more flexible" performance.

=== "Intermezzo interrotto" ===
According to Antal Doráti, Béla Bartók was profoundly irritated at the Seventh Symphony's success and that he "gave vent to [his] anger" by lampooning it in the "Intermezzo interrotto" from his Concerto for Orchestra. Peter Bartók recalled that while listening to the broadcast of the Seventh's premiere, his father complained, "It's not just that repetition of a theme so many times is excessive under any conditions. But of such a theme!"

György Sándor later disputed that Bartók disliked the symphony, but Taruskin called his a "wan claim", and said that Bartók's parody is in the same key and follows the same note sequence as Shostakovich's theme.
