= Karl Eliasberg =

Soviet orchestra conductor (1907–1978)

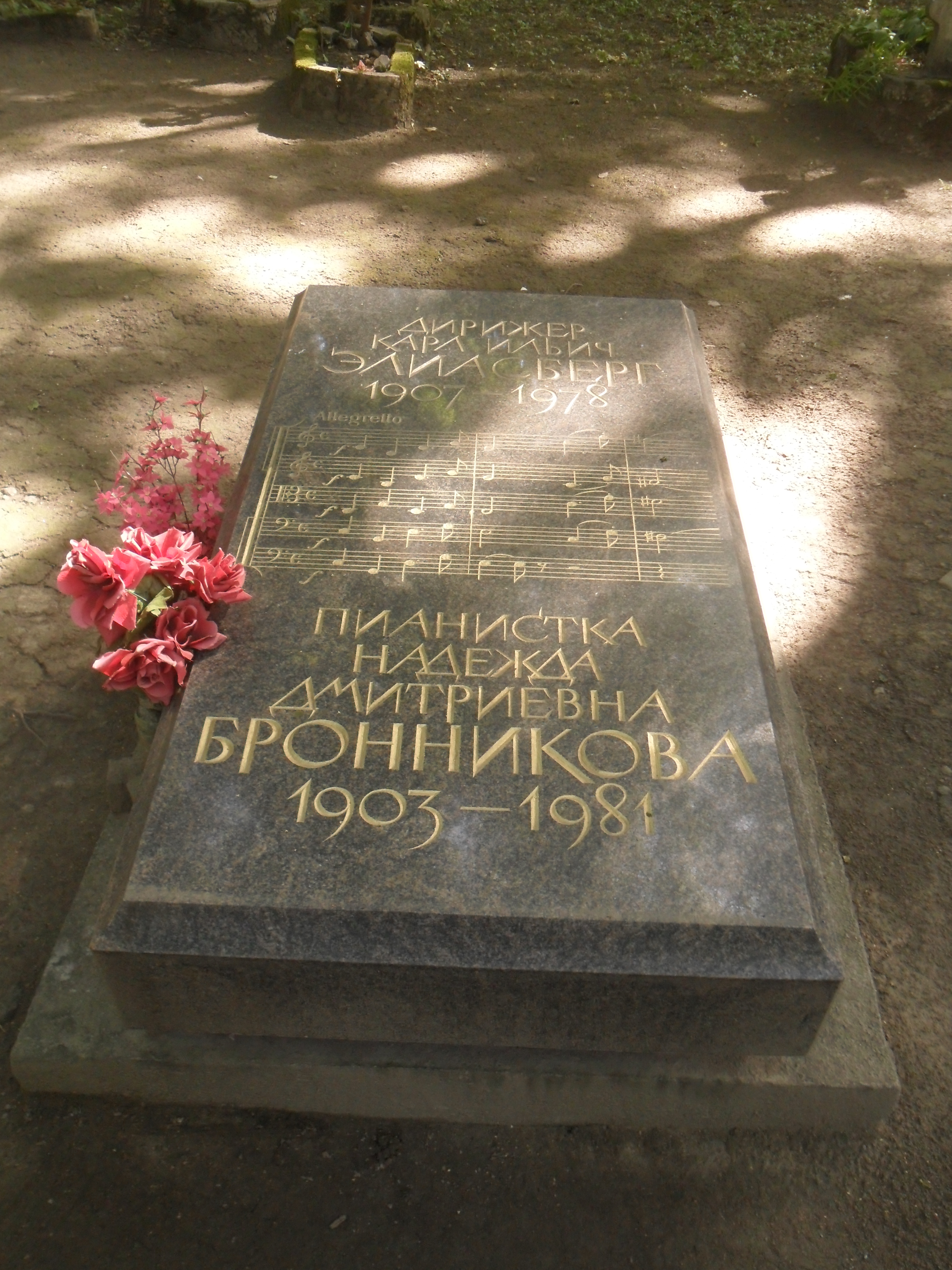
The grave of Karl Eliasberg and of his wife Nadezhda Bronnikova in Saint Petersburg

Karl Ilitch Eliasberg (Belarusian: Карл Ілліч Эліасберг; Russian: Карл Ильич Элиасберг) (10 June 1907, in Minsk – 12 February 1978, in Leningrad) was a Soviet conductor, best known for conducting the Leningrad première of Shostakovich's Symphony No. 7 during the Siege of Leningrad in 1942.

== Early life ==
Born in Minsk, his father, Ilya, was an accountant, and his mother was a housewife. In 1911 the family moved to Elisavetgrad, where he began his musical education at the age of 6. He started as a violinist under the tutelage of Joachim Goldberg, a future professor of the Kharkov Conservatory who was himself a student of Isaac Zhuk.

In 1916, at age 9, Eliasberg entered the gymnasium, where he studied until 1922. That year, his father died of typhus in Minsk, and, according to Eliasberg's autobiography, he and his mother then moved to Petrograd. He then entered the Leningrad Conservatory, where he studied violin under Professor Sergei Korguyev, who had studied under Leopold Auer. At the conservatory, Eliasberg simultaneously studied conducting, and graduated with a degree in violin in 1929.

He then served as conductor of the Leningrad Theatre of Musical Comedy from 1929 to 1931 before joining Leningrad Radio as conductor.

In 1937, he married a member of the orchestra, pianist Nadezhda Dmitrievna Bronnikova (1903-1981).

== The siege of Leningrad ==
Eliasberg was conductor of the Leningrad Radio Orchestra and only second conductor of the Leningrad Philharmonic but played a part in one key event in society and culture in Saint Petersburg during the siege of Leningrad when Dmitri Shostakovich dedicated his Seventh Symphony to the city as the "Leningrad Symphony."

Eliasberg and his wife Nadezhda were brought by sled to the inpatient hospital in the Hotel Astoria, due to extreme exhaustion and dystrophy caused by the malnourishment rampant during the siege. The couple spent January through April 1942 in the hotel, and it was there where Eliasberg received the request from city officials to perform Shostakovich's 7th Symphony.

The symphony had already been premiered in Kuibyshev on 5 March 1942 under Samuil Samosud, then performed in Moscow (29 March 1942), London (22 June 1942) and New York City (19 July 1942). When Eliasberg was asked to conduct the Leningrad première, only 15 members of the orchestra were still available; the others had either starved to death or left to fight the enemy. During the days of the siege of Leningrad, Eliasberg saved many lives by getting musicians to rehearsals and to feeding stations. The concert was given on 9 August 1942 in the Leningrad Bolshoy Philharmonic Hall under the baton of Eliasberg, with artists he had gathered from the main orchestra, the reserve orchestra, and military bands. It was heard over the radio and lifted the spirits of the survivors.

Eliasberg was recognised as a Meritorious Artist of the Russian Soviet Federative Socialist Republic in 1944, but after the war Yevgeny Mravinsky returned and blocked Eliasberg's career in Leningrad, so he became a travelling provincial conductor.

== Postwar life ==
Between 1945 and 1975 Eliasberg headlined in Leningrad only three more times – each of them with the Seventh Symphony, each of them with the reserve orchestra. In 1961, he conducted the first movement only. In 1964, there was a reunion of Eliasberg and 22 of the original musicians before a performance in Shostakovich's presence on 27 January 1964; it was the first time they had been together in 22 years. The musicians played in their same seats. Eliasberg said the concert was dedicated to those who had performed then but died since, and the audience gave a standing ovation. Eliasberg later wrote:

"Those moments do not come often. I cannot explain the feeling I had. The glory of fame and the grief of loss, and the thought that maybe the brightest moments of your life are gone. The city now lives a peaceful life, but no one has the right to forget the past."

The third time was 9 May 1975 three years before his death.

In 1978 Eliasberg died, almost forgotten, and his ashes were buried in a small plot at the back of the Piskaryovskoye Memorial Cemetery. After the fall of Communism, Yuri Temirkanov led a resurrection of Eliasberg's reputation and mayor Anatoly Sobchak arranged for Eliasberg's ashes to be moved to a more suitable grave among the Literatorskie Mostki at the Volkovo Cemetery.

== Recordings ==
- Brahms: German Requiem (rec. 1960), Symphony No.3 (rec. 1948), Symphony No. 4 (live concert recording, May 9, 1960), Double Concerto (rec. 1951, with David Oistrakh and Sviatoslav Knushevitsky)
- Mahler: Symphony No. 4 with soprano Natalya Rozhdestvenskaya USSR State Symphony Orchestra. Rec. Oct 19, 1954
- Shostakovich: Symphony No. 7 Leningrad Philharmonic. Live concert recording, Jan 27, 1964
- Sergei Taneyev: Symphonies No. 1 and No. 3
- J. S. Bach Mass in B minor. Live concert recording, April 24, 1957)

== In popular culture ==
The Leningrad Radio Orchestra's performance of Shostakovich's Seventh Symphony conducted by Karl Eliasberg is the subject of the 2011 novel The Conductor by New Zealand author Sarah Quigley.

The concert during the Leningrad siege was commemorated in the 1997 film The War Symphonies: Shostakovich Against Stalin and featured in the documentary Leningrad and the Orchestra that defied Hitler, broadcast on BBC Two on 2 January 2016. Earlier radio broadcasts by the BBC on the same subject include Witness and Newshour.
