= Leningrad première of Shostakovich's Symphony No. 7 =

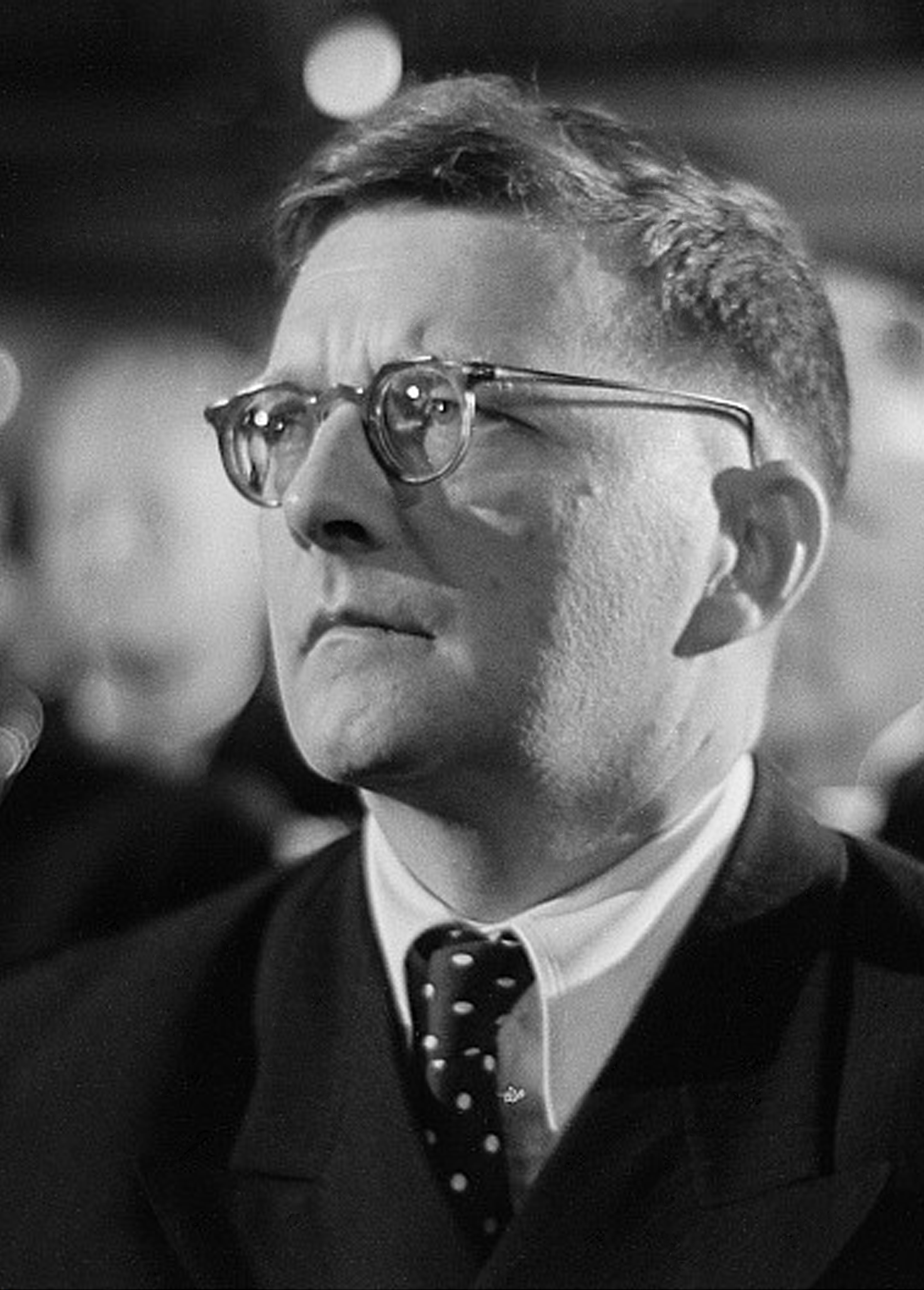
Shostakovich in 1950

Dmitri Shostakovich's Symphony No. 7 had its Leningrad première on 9 August 1942 during the Second World War, while the city was under siege by the Nazi German forces.

Shostakovich had intended the piece to be premièred by the Leningrad Philharmonic Orchestra, but because of the siege that group was evacuated from the city, as was the composer himself. The world première of the symphony was held on 5 March 1942, in Kuybyshev with the Bolshoi Theatre Orchestra. The Leningrad première was performed by the surviving musicians of the Leningrad Radio Orchestra, supplemented with military performers, with Karl Eliasberg conducting. Most of the musicians were suffering from starvation, which made rehearsing difficult: musicians frequently collapsed during rehearsals, and three died. The orchestra was able to play the symphony all the way through only once before the concert.

Despite the poor condition of the performers, the concert was highly successful, prompting an hour-long ovation. The concert was supported by a Soviet military offensive, code-named Squall, intended to silence German forces during the performance. The symphony was broadcast to the German lines by loudspeaker as a form of psychological warfare. The Leningrad première was considered by music critics to be one of the most important artistic performances of the war because of its psychological and political effects. The conductor concluded that "in that moment, we triumphed over the soulless Nazi war machine". Reunion concerts featuring surviving musicians were convened in 1964 and 1992 to commemorate the event.

== Background ==
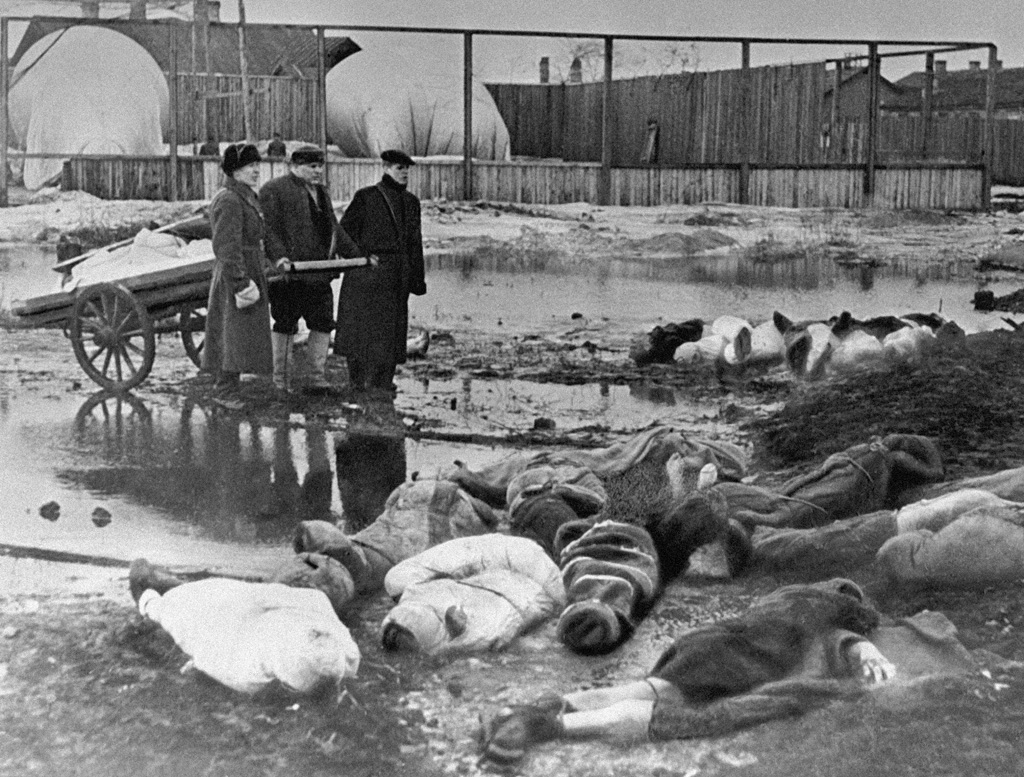
The siege caused mass casualties from cold and starvation.

Soviet composer Dmitri Shostakovich completed his Symphony No. 7 on 27 December 1941 and dedicated it to his native Leningrad. At the time the city was about 16 weeks into its 125-week siege by Nazi German forces, which would kill about a third of the city's pre-war population.

Shostakovich wanted the Leningrad Philharmonic Orchestra to première the symphony, but that group had been evacuated to Novosibirsk as part of the government-led cultural exodus. The world première was instead held in Kuybyshev on 5 March 1942, performed by the Bolshoi Theatre Orchestra under conductor Samuil Samosud. The Moscow première was given by a combination of the Bolshoi and the All-Union Radio orchestras on 29 March in the Columned Hall of the House of Unions.

The microfilmed score of the symphony was flown to Tehran in April to allow its promulgation to the West. It received its radio première in Western Europe on 22 June, in a performance broadcast by Henry Wood and the London Philharmonic Orchestra, and its concert première at a Promenade concert at London's Royal Albert Hall on 29 June. The North American première was broadcast from New York City on 19 July 1942 by the NBC Symphony Orchestra under Arturo Toscanini.

== Preparation ==
The Leningrad Radio Orchestra under Karl Eliasberg was the only remaining symphonic ensemble in Leningrad after the Philharmonic was evacuated. The Radio Orchestra's last performance had taken place on 14 December 1941 and its final broadcast on 1 January 1942. A log note from the next scheduled rehearsal reads "Rehearsal did not take place. Srabian is dead. Petrov is sick. Borishev is dead. Orchestra not working".

On 2 April 1942, Boris Zagorsky and Yasha Babushkin of the Leningrad city arts department announced preparations for the symphony's performance. The hiatus in musical broadcasts was quickly ended by Andrei Zhdanov, a Soviet politician involved in the defence of Leningrad, to allow for rehearsals and provide a morale boost for the city. Performing the symphony "became a matter of civic, even military, pride". According to an orchestra member, "the Leningrad authorities wanted to give the people some emotional stimulation so that they could feel cared for". It was considered an important political act because of its potential value as propaganda.

Of the original 40-member Leningrad Radio Orchestra, only 14 or 15 still lived in the city; the others had either starved to death or left to fight the enemy. Shostakovich's symphony required an expanded orchestra of 100 players, meaning the remaining personnel were grossly insufficient. Eliasberg, at the time being treated for "dystrophy", went door to door to seek out those musicians who had not responded to the orchestra's reassembly due to starvation or weakness. "My God, how thin many of them were," one of the organizers remembered. "How those people livened up when we started to ferret them out of their dark apartments. We were moved to tears when they brought out their concert clothes, their violins and cellos and flutes, and rehearsals began under the icy canopy of the studio." A plane carrying supplies from Kuybyshev airlifted the symphony's 252-page conductor's score into Leningrad.

The first rehearsal in March 1942 was intended to be three hours long, but had to be stopped after 15 minutes because the musicians present were too weak to play their instruments. They frequently collapsed during rehearsals, especially those playing brass instruments. Eliasberg himself had to be dragged to rehearsals on a sledge, and was eventually moved by Communist officials to an apartment nearby and given a bicycle for transport. His first attempts at conducting were like a "wounded bird with wings that are going to drop at any moment". A report by Yasha Babushkin noted that "the first violin is dying, the drum died on his way to work, the French horn is at death's door ...". Orchestral players were given additional rations (donated by civilian music enthusiasts) in an effort to combat starvation, and hot bricks were used to radiate heat; nevertheless, three performers died during rehearsals. Posters went up around the city requesting all musicians to report to the Radio Committee for incorporation into the orchestra. Performers were also recalled from the front or reassigned from Soviet military bands with the support of the Soviet commander of the Leningrad front, Leonid Govorov.

In addition to the Seventh Symphony, the makeshift orchestra also rehearsed traditional symphonic works by Beethoven, Tchaikovsky and Rimsky-Korsakov. A concert of Tchaikovsky excerpts was held on 5 April. Some players protested the decision to perform Shostakovich's symphony, not wanting to expend their little strength on an "intricate and not very accessible" work. Eliasberg threatened to rescind the additional rations, quelling any dissent. During the rehearsals, Eliasberg was criticised for his harsh demeanour: musicians who missed rehearsals, were late, or did not perform to expectations lost their rations. One performer lost rations because he had attended his wife's burial and was late for rehearsal. Although some sources suggest a team of copyists was employed, according to other sources musicians were made to copy out their individual parts by hand from the score.

Rehearsals were held six days a week at the Pushkin Theatre, usually from 10 am to 1 pm. They were frequently interrupted by air-raid sirens, and some musicians were required to undertake anti-aircraft or firefighting duties. To enable them to attend rehearsals, performers were granted orchestral ID cards to show at checkpoints. Members of the military orchestra (and some ordinary troops) were dispatched to the rehearsals to supplement the performers. Rehearsals were moved to the Philharmonia Hall in June, and in late July were increased to 5–6 hours a day. Instruments were in poor condition and few repairmen were available; one oboist was asked for a cat in exchange for a repair, as the starving repairman had already eaten several.

The orchestra played the entire symphony all the way through only once before the première, at a dress rehearsal on 6 August.

== Performance ==
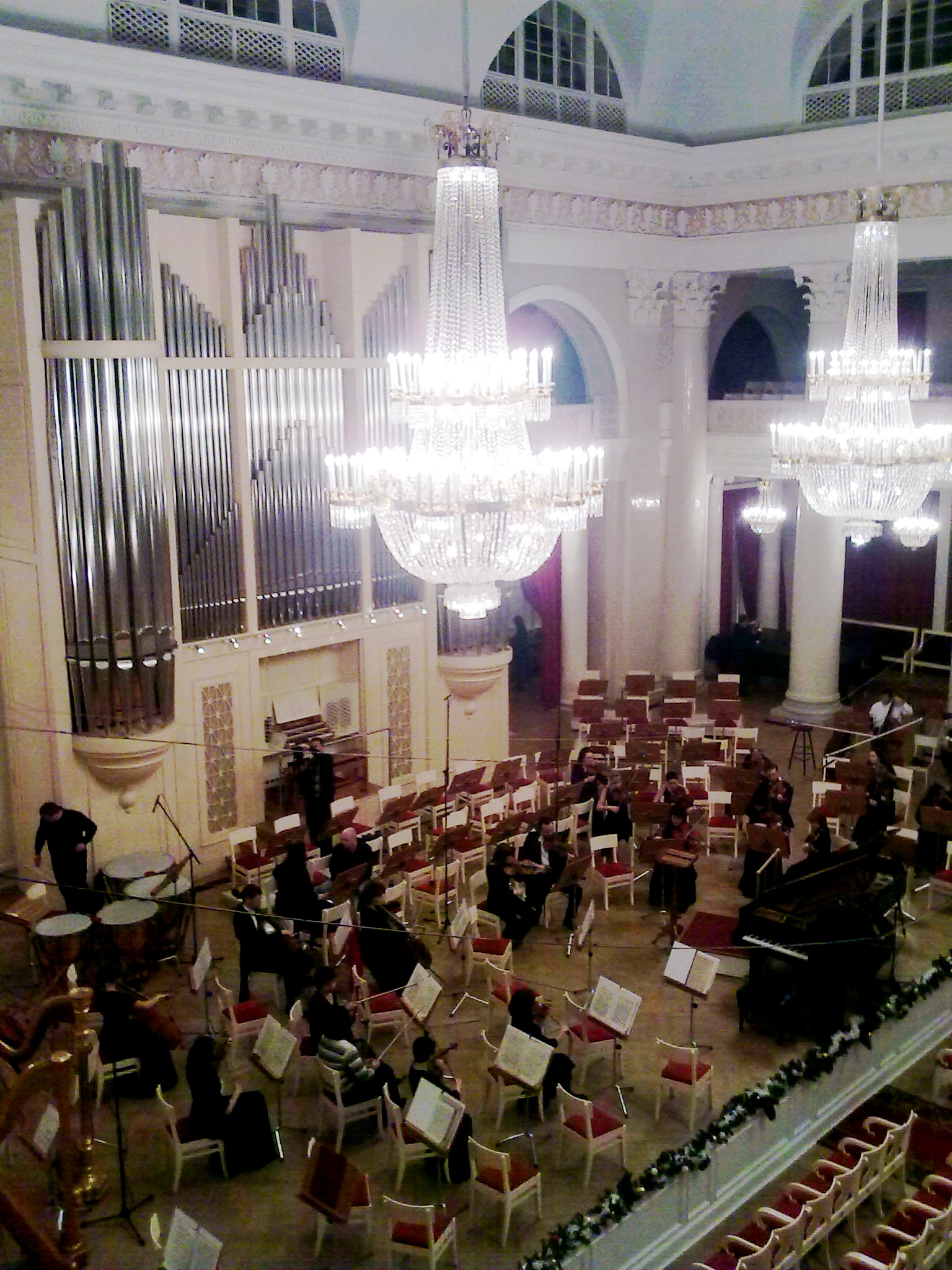
The modern stage of the Grand Philharmonia Hall, where the concert was performed

The concert was given in the Grand Philharmonia Hall on 9 August 1942. This was the day German Chancellor Adolf Hitler had previously designated to celebrate the fall of the city with a lavish banquet at Leningrad's Astoria Hotel. The performance was preceded by a pre-recorded radio address by Eliasberg, aired at 6 pm:

Comrades – a great occurrence in the cultural history of our city is about to take place. In a few minutes, you will hear for the first time the Seventh Symphony of Dmitri Shostakovich, our outstanding fellow citizen. He wrote this great composition in the city during the days when the enemy was, insanely, trying to enter Leningrad. When the fascist swine were bombing and shelling all Europe, and Europe believed the days of Leningrad were over. But this performance is witness to our spirit, courage and readiness to fight. Listen, Comrades!

Lieutenant-General Govorov ordered a bombardment of German artillery positions in advance of the concert in a special operation, code-named "Squall". Soviet intelligence personnel had located the German batteries and observation posts a few weeks before, in preparation for the attack. Three thousand high-calibre shells were fired at the German troops. The purpose of the operation was to prevent them from targeting the concert hall and to ensure that it would be quiet enough to hear the music over speakers he ordered to be set up. He also encouraged Soviet soldiers to listen to the concert via radio. Musicologist Andrei Krukov later praised Govorov's actions as providing the "incentive" for the concert, adding that his choice to allow soldiers to participate was "a quite exceptional decision". Govorov himself later remarked to Eliasberg that "we played our instrument in the symphony, too, you know", in reference to the artillery fire. The military contribution to the affair was not widely known until well after the war ended.

There was a large audience for the concert, comprising party leaders, military personnel, and civilians. Leningrad citizens who could not fit into the hall gathered around open windows and loudspeakers. The musicians onstage were "dressed like cabbages" in multiple layers to prevent starvation-induced shivering. Shortly before the concert started, the electric lights above the stage were turned on for the first time since rehearsals had commenced. As the hall fell silent, Eliasberg began conducting. The performance was of poor artistic quality, but was notable for the emotions raised in the audience and for its finale: when some musicians "faltered" due to exhaustion, the audience stood up "in a remarkable, spontaneous gesture ... willing them to keep going".

The performance received an hour-long ovation, with Eliasberg being given a bouquet of Leningrad-grown flowers by a young girl. Many in the audience were in tears due to the emotional impact of the concert, which was seen as a "musical biography of suffering Leningrad". The musicians were invited to a banquet with Communist Party officials to celebrate.

Loudspeakers broadcast the performance throughout the city as well as to the German forces in a move of psychological warfare, a "tactical strike against German morale". One German soldier recalled how his squadron "listened to the symphony of heroes". Eliasberg later met with some of the Germans who camped outside Leningrad during the performance, who told him that it had made them believe they would never capture the city: "Who are we bombing? We will never be able to take Leningrad because the people here are selfless".

== Reception and legacy ==
Shostakovich scholar Laurel Fay suggests that this concert was "an event of legendary import all by itself". Journalist Michael Tumelty calls it "a legendary moment in Soviet political and military history". Critic U.S. Dhuga suggests that this performance "was popularly – and, of course, officially – recognized as the prelude to actual victory over the Germans". The blockade was breached in early 1943 and ended in 1944. Eliasberg concurred with Dhuga's assessment, saying that "the whole city had found its humanity ... in that moment, we triumphed over the soulless Nazi war machine". There was no official recognition of the significance of the concert: one musician noted that afterwards "there was no feedback, nothing, until 1945".

Shostakovich's Symphony No. 7 was popular throughout the Western world during the war, but from 1945 it was rarely performed outside the Soviet Union. It became a point of controversy in the 1980s after Solomon Volkov's Testimony suggested it was a critique not of the Nazis, but of the Soviet government. The veracity of Volkov's account, which he claims is rooted in interviews with Shostakovich, has been disputed. Other issues of contention about the symphony include whether it was inspired by the attack on Leningrad (as Soviet authorities and official accounts had asserted) or planned earlier and repurposed for propaganda, as well as its artistic merit compared to Shostakovich's other works.

The première made Eliasberg a "hero of the city". Shortly after the concert, he married Nina Bronnikova, who had played the piano part. But once the siege ended and the Philharmonic returned to Leningrad, he fell from favour. Eliasberg was a "poor and largely forgotten" travelling conductor when he died in 1978. However, at the fifty-year anniversary of the première his remains were moved to the prestigious Volkovskoye or Alexander Nevsky Cemetery. Sarah Quigley fictionalized Eliasberg's wartime career in her historical novel The Conductor.

Surviving performers participated in reunion concerts in 1964 and 1992, playing "from the same seats in the same hall". Shostakovich attended the first reunion concert on 27 January 1964. Twenty-two musicians and Eliasberg performed the symphony, and instruments were placed on the other chairs to represent those participants who had died since the première. The 1992 performance featured the 14 remaining survivors. The 1942 concert was also commemorated in the 1997 film The War Symphonies: Shostakovich Against Stalin. There is a small museum dedicated to the event at School No. 235 in St. Petersburg, which includes a statue of Shostakovich and artefacts from the performance.
