= Saint Petersburg Academic Symphony Orchestra =

Russian symphony orchestra, founded in 1931

The Saint Petersburg Academic Symphony Orchestra (in Russian: Академический симфонический оркестр Санкт-Петербургской филармонии), founded in 1931 as the Leningrad Radio Orchestra, is one of the two symphony orchestras belonging to the Saint Petersburg Philharmonia society, the other being the Saint Petersburg Philharmonic Orchestra.

In 1942, during the Siege of Leningrad, the orchestra under its conductor Karl Eliasberg performed the Leningrad première of Shostakovich's Symphony No. 7.

In 1953, it came under the umbrella of Saint Petersburg Philharmonia.

Aleksandr Dmitriyev has been its musical director since 1977.

== See also ==
- Moscow Academic Symphony Orchestra
