= Symphony No. 7 (Shostakovich) =

1941 symphony by Dmitri Shostakovich

- Leningrad
- by Dmitri Shostakovich
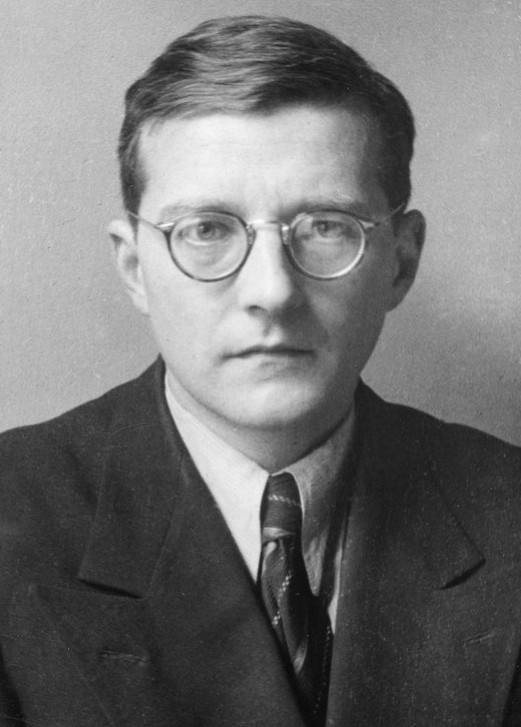
- Key: C major
- Opus: 60
- Composed: December 1941

Dmitri Shostakovich's Symphony No. 7 in C major, Op. 60, nicknamed the Leningrad Symphony, was begun in Leningrad, completed in the city of Samara (then known as Kuybyshev) in December 1941, and premiered in that city on March 5, 1942. At first dedicated to Lenin, it was eventually submitted in honor of the besieged city of Leningrad, where it was first played under dire circumstances on August 9, 1942, nearly a year into the siege by German forces.

The performance was broadcast by loudspeaker throughout the city and to the German forces in a show of resilience and defiance. The Leningrad soon became popular in both the Soviet Union and the West as a symbol of resistance to fascism and totalitarianism, thanks in part to the composer's microfilming of the score in Samara and its clandestine delivery, via Tehran and Cairo, to New York, where Arturo Toscanini conducted the NBC Symphony Orchestra in a broadcast performance on July 19, 1942, and Time magazine placed Shostakovich on its cover. That popularity faded somewhat after 1945, but the work is still regarded as a major musical testament to the 27 million Soviet people who lost their lives in World War II, and it is often played at Leningrad Cemetery, where half a million victims of the 900-day Siege of Leningrad are buried.

== Length and form ==
Shostakovich's longest symphony, the work typically takes approximately 80 minutes to perform. It has four movements. Shostakovich at first gave them titles—"War", "Reminiscence", "Home Expanses", and "Victory"—but he soon withdrew these and left the movements with their tempo markings alone.

=== I. Allegretto ===
The first movement is in a modified sonata form that the musicologist Hugh Ottaway described as "misplaced and misshapen". It begins with a broad theme played by the strings in unison, which is later echoed by the woodwinds. This is followed by a slower section played by flutes and strings, which segues into a 22-measure ostinato march that Shostakovich anticipated would be compared to Ravel's Boléro. At the end of the twelfth statement of the theme, the brass present an inverted version of the theme, which is developed into a climax. After this a slower, two-part section follows, with a bassoon solo introduced by a solo clarinet; then a soft recapitulation of the opening theme is played by the strings. The movement's brief coda repeats fragments of the "invasion" theme, played by a solo muted trumpet and percussion.

=== II. Moderato (poco allegretto) ===
The second movement is the symphony's shortest. Shostakovich referred to it as a "very lyrical scherzo". It begins in the latter vein with a quiet, playful theme in the strings. Moments later, a solo oboe plays a high variation on the tune. Other instruments continue with tunes of their own for several moments. Then, in the middle of the movement, woodwinds interject with a brash, shrill theme, followed by brass, then strings, then woodwinds. This eventually leads to a quick, majestic passage that is another ostinato, but different from the invasion theme in the first movement. The remaining third of the movement is much like the beginning of the second movement.

=== III. Adagio ===
The third movement begins with slow, sustained woodwind notes, accentuated by the horns. This simple theme cadences, and is followed by a declamatory theme played by violins. Winds and brass repeat the string theme, which the strings take over with another brief variation. This transitions directly into a faster passage. The violins return with the opening theme of the movement. This builds into a somewhat frantic passage underlaid by an ostinato in the lower strings. This leads into a loud development section. The passage ends quickly, with the woodwinds bringing back the original theme, again echoed by the strings, just as in the beginning. The final third of the movement continues in this vein.

=== IV. Allegro non troppo ===
The finale begins without interruption with a quiet melody in the strings. The high strings hold the high notes, and are joined briefly by woodwinds. The low strings suddenly begin a quick march-like tune that is answered by violins and the rest of the orchestra. A transitional passage follows, with three-note figures played by high strings, accented by slap pizzicati in the cellos and basses. A slower and sharply accented section follows, which leads to a development section, with themes from earlier movements. Woodwinds build on one of these until violins take over with another theme that builds to the climax. The symphony ends in the key of C major.

== Instrumentation ==
The work is written for a large orchestra consisting of:

Woodwinds

3 flutes (2nd doubling alto flute; 3rd doubling piccolo)
2 oboes
cor anglais
3 clarinets in B♭ and A (3rd doubling E♭ clarinet)
bass clarinet
2 bassoons
contrabassoon

Brass
8 horns
6 trumpets
6 trombones
tuba

Percussion
5 timpani
bass drum
snare drum (at least one; two to three recommended)
cymbals
tam-tam
triangle
tambourine
xylophone

Keyboard
piano

Strings
2 harps; and a minimum of:
16 1st violins
14 2nd violins
12 violas
10 cellos
8 double basses

According to the score, horns 5-8, trumpets 4-6, and trombones 4-6 are separate from the rest of the brass section.

== Composition ==
=== "Music about terror" ===
There are conflicting accounts of when Shostakovich began the symphony. Officially, he was said to have composed it in response to the German invasion. In his memoirs, the violinist Rostislav Dubinsky said that Shostakovich had already completed the first movement a year earlier. According to statements attributed to the composer in Solomon Volkov's Testimony, he had planned the symphony before the German attack and had "other enemies of humanity" in mind when he composed the "invasion theme" of the first movement. In the book, he is also reported to have said that in dedicating the symphony to Leningrad, he had in mind not the city under German siege, but the city "Stalin destroyed and Hitler merely finished off."

Shostakovich did not like talking about what he called "creative plans", preferring to announce his works upon their completion. He did like to say, "I think slowly but I write fast." In practice this meant that Shostakovich usually had a work completed in his head before he began writing it down. The Leningrad Symphony would not have made its announcement without the composer's consent, so Shostakovich likely had a clear idea at that time of what his Seventh Symphony would portray.

Soviet music critic Lev Lebedinsky, a friend of the composer's for years, confirmed after the dawn of glasnost ("openness") under Mikhail Gorbachev that Shostakovich had conceived the Seventh Symphony before Hitler invaded Russia:

The famous theme in the first movement Shostakovich had first as the Stalin theme (which close friends of the composer knew). Right after the war started, the composer called it the anti-Hitler theme. Later Shostakovich referred to that "German" theme as the "theme of evil," which was absolutely true, since the theme was just as much anti-Hitler as it was anti-Stalin, even though the world music community fixed on only the first of the two definitions.

Another important witness was the daughter-in-law of Maxim Litvinov, the man who served as Soviet foreign minister before the war, then was dismissed by Stalin. She heard Shostakovich play the Seventh Symphony on the piano in a private home during the war. The guests later discussed the music:

And then Shostakovich said meditatively: of course, it's about fascism, but music, real music is never literally tied to a theme. Fascism is not simply National Socialism, and this is music about terror, slavery, and oppression of the spirit. Later, when Shostakovich got used to me and came to trust me, he said openly that the Seventh (and the Fifth as well) was not only about fascism but about our country and generally about all tyranny and totalitarianism.

While Shostakovich could speak like this only in a narrow circle of friends, it did not stop him from hinting to the Soviet Press about a hidden agenda for the Seventh Symphony. He insisted, for instance, that the "central place" of the first movement was not the "invasion section" (the part journalists usually asked about first). Rather, the movement's core was the tragic music that follows the invasion section, which the composer described as "a funeral march or, rather, a requiem." He continued, "After the requiem comes an even more tragic episode. I do not know how to characterize that music. Perhaps it is a mother's tears or even the feeling that the sorrow is so great that there are no more tears left."

=== "Inquisition for blood" ===
The Nazi attack and consequent relaxing of Soviet censorship gave Shostakovich the hope of writing the work for a mass audience. Shostakovich's plan was for a single-movement symphony, including a chorus and a requiem-like passage for a vocal soloist, with a text taken from the Psalms of David. With the help of his best friend, critic Ivan Sollertinsky, who was knowledgeable about the Bible, he selected excerpts from the Ninth Psalm. The idea of individual suffering became interwoven in Shostakovich's mind with the Lord God's vengeance for the taking of innocent blood (Verse 12, New King James Version).

A public performance of a work with such a text would have been impossible before the German invasion. Now it was feasible, at least in theory, with the reference to "blood" applied at least officially to Hitler. With Stalin appealing to the Soviets' patriotic and religious sentiments, the authorities were no longer suppressing Orthodox themes or images.

=== "Invasion" theme ===
Musicologist Ludmila Mikheyeva (who is also Ivan Sollertinsky's daughter-in-law) maintains that Shostakovich played the theme and its variations for his students before the war with Germany began.

While the word "invasion" was used by commentators in numerous articles and reviews, Shostakovich never used it to describe the episode or theme. "I did not set myself the goal of a naturalistic depiction of military action (the roar of planes, the crash of tanks, cannon fire). I did not compose so-called battle music. I wanted to convey the context of grim events."

The "invasion theme" does not sound threatening, at least at first. For its latter half, Shostakovich quotes Graf Danilo's entrance song, "Da geh' ich zu Maxim," from Franz Lehár's operetta The Merry Widow. The Merry Widow was Hitler's favorite operetta, happily for Soviet propagandists writing about the symphony. A version of this song may have already existed in Russia. Set to the words "I'll go and see Maxim", it was reportedly sung jokingly in the Shostakovich household to the composer's son. Arthur Lourié called the theme a "trite, intentionally silly motif", adding, "This tune can be whistled by any Soviet man on the street. ..." Conductor Yevgeny Mravinsky echoed Lourié when he called it a generalized image of spreading stupidity and triteness.

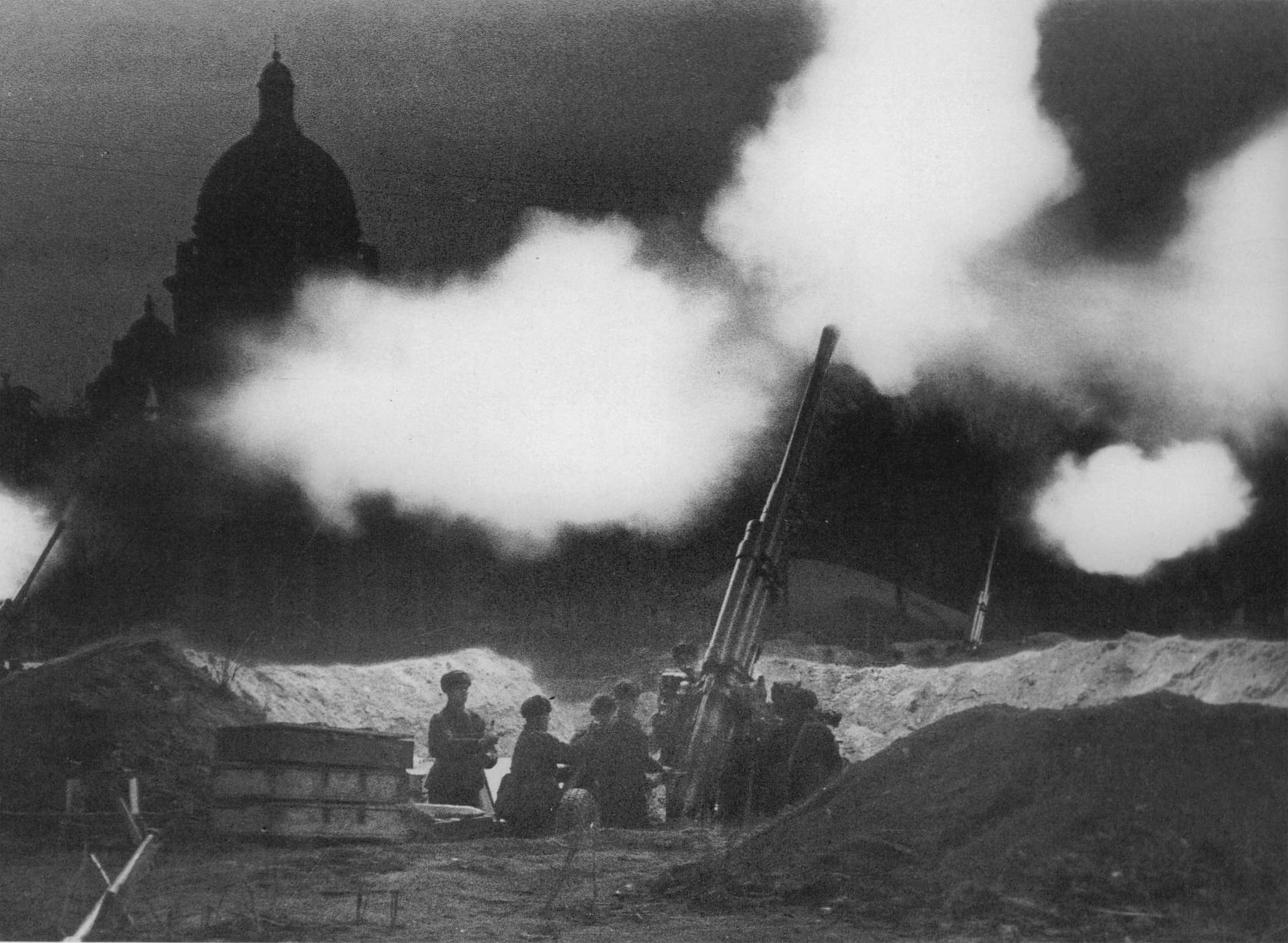
Fire of anti-aircraft guns deployed in the neighborhood of St. Isaac's cathedral during the defense of Leningrad (now called St. Petersburg, its pre-Soviet name) in 1941.

=== Tensions not resolved ===
Two weeks before he planned to complete the symphony-requiem, Shostakovich played what he had finished to date for Sollertinsky, who was being evacuated with the Leningrad Philharmonic. While playing the music, Shostakovich realized that what he had written was not a complete work in itself but actually the beginning of something much larger, since the tensions brought up in the symphony-requiem had not been resolved. The question now became whether to stay in the city to continue working or to evacuate and resume the work after a long hiatus. By the time he decided to evacuate, it was too late—the Germans had cut off the rail link to the city. He and his family were trapped.

On 2 September, the day the Germans began bombarding the city, Shostakovich began the second movement. Working at high intensity between sprints to the bomb shelter, he completed it within two weeks. Within hours he accepted a request to speak on Radio Leningrad to address the city. In a matter-of-fact tone, he attempted to assure his fellow Leningraders that for him it was business as usual:

An hour ago I finished the score of two movements of a large symphonic composition. If I succeed in carrying it off, if I manage to complete the third and fourth movements, then perhaps I'll be able to call it my Seventh Symphony. Why am I telling you this? So that the radio listeners who are listening to me now will know that life in our city is proceeding normally.

That evening he played what he had written so far to a small group of Leningrad musicians. After Shostakovich finished the first movement, there was a long silence. An air-raid warning sounded. No one moved. Everyone wanted to hear the piece again. The composer excused himself to take his family to the nearest air-raid shelter. When he returned, he repeated the first movement, which then was followed by the next movement for his guests. Their reaction encouraged him to start that night on the Adagio. He completed this movement on 29 September in the city. Shostakovich and his family were then evacuated to Moscow on 1 October 1941. They moved to Kuybyshev (now Samara) on 22 October, where the symphony was finally completed.

== Premières ==
The world première was held in Kuybyshev on 5 March 1942. The Bolshoi Theatre Orchestra, conducted by Samuil Samosud, gave a rousing performance that was broadcast across the Soviet Union and later in the West as well. The Moscow première took place on 29 March 1942 in the Columned Hall of the House of Unions, by a joined orchestra of the Bolshoi Orchestra and the All-Union Radio Orchestra.

The microfilmed score was flown to Tehran and travelled to the West in April 1942. The symphony received its broadcast première in Europe by Sir Henry J. Wood and the London Philharmonic Orchestra on 22 June 1942 in London, and concert première at a Proms concert at the Royal Albert Hall. The première in North America took place in New York City on 19 July 1942, by the NBC Symphony Orchestra under Arturo Toscanini in a concert broadcast nationwide on the NBC radio network. This performance was originally released on LP by RCA Victor in 1967.

Much had to be done before the Leningrad première could take place. The Leningrad Radio Orchestra under Karl Eliasberg was the only remaining symphonic ensemble. The orchestra had survived—barely—but it had not been playing and musical broadcasts had ceased. Music was not considered a priority by Party officials. Political appeals took a significant part of the broadcast time. Even then, there were hours of silence because of the lack of agitators. As for the city itself, Leningrad surrounded by the Nazis had become a living hell, with eyewitness reports of people who had died of cold and starvation lying in doorways in stairwells. "They lay there because people dropped them there, the way newborn infants used to be left. Janitors swept them away in the morning like rubbish. Funerals, graves, coffins were long forgotten. It was a flood of death that could not be managed. Entire families vanished, entire apartments with their collective families. Houses, streets and neighborhoods vanished."

The official hiatus on musical broadcasts had to end before the symphony could be performed. This happened quickly, with a complete about-face by Party authorities. Next was reforming the orchestra. Only 15 members were still available; the others had either starved to death or left to fight the enemy. Posters went up, requesting all Leningrad musicians to report to the Radio Committee. Efforts were also made to seek out those musicians who could not come. "My God, how thin many of them were," one of the organizers of the performance remembered. "How those people livened up when we started to ferret them out of their dark apartments. We were moved to tears when they brought out their concert clothes, their violins and cellos and flutes, and rehearsals began under the icy canopy of the studio." Orchestral players were given additional rations.

Before they tackled Shostakovich's work, Eliasberg had the players go through pieces from the standard repertoire—Beethoven, Tchaikovsky, Rimsky-Korsakov—which they also performed for broadcast. Because the city was still blockaded at the time, the score was flown by night in early July for rehearsal. A team of copyists worked for days to prepare the parts despite shortages of materials. At rehearsal, some musicians protested, not wanting to waste their little strength on an intricate and not very accessible work. Eliasberg threatened to hold back the additional rations, quelling any dissent.

The concert was given on 9 August 1942. Whether this date was chosen intentionally, it was the day Hitler had chosen previously to celebrate the fall of Leningrad with a lavish banquet at the Astoria Hotel. Loudspeakers broadcast the performance throughout the city as well as to the German forces in a move of psychological warfare. The Soviet commander of the Leningrad front, General Govorov, ordered a bombardment of German artillery positions in advance to ensure their silence during the performance of the symphony; a special operation, code-named "Squall," was executed for precisely this purpose. Three thousand high-caliber shells were lobbed onto the enemy.

The symphony was not premiered in Germany until after the war. It took place in Berlin on 22 December 1946, with Sergiu Celibidache conducting the Berlin Philharmonic.

== Reception ==
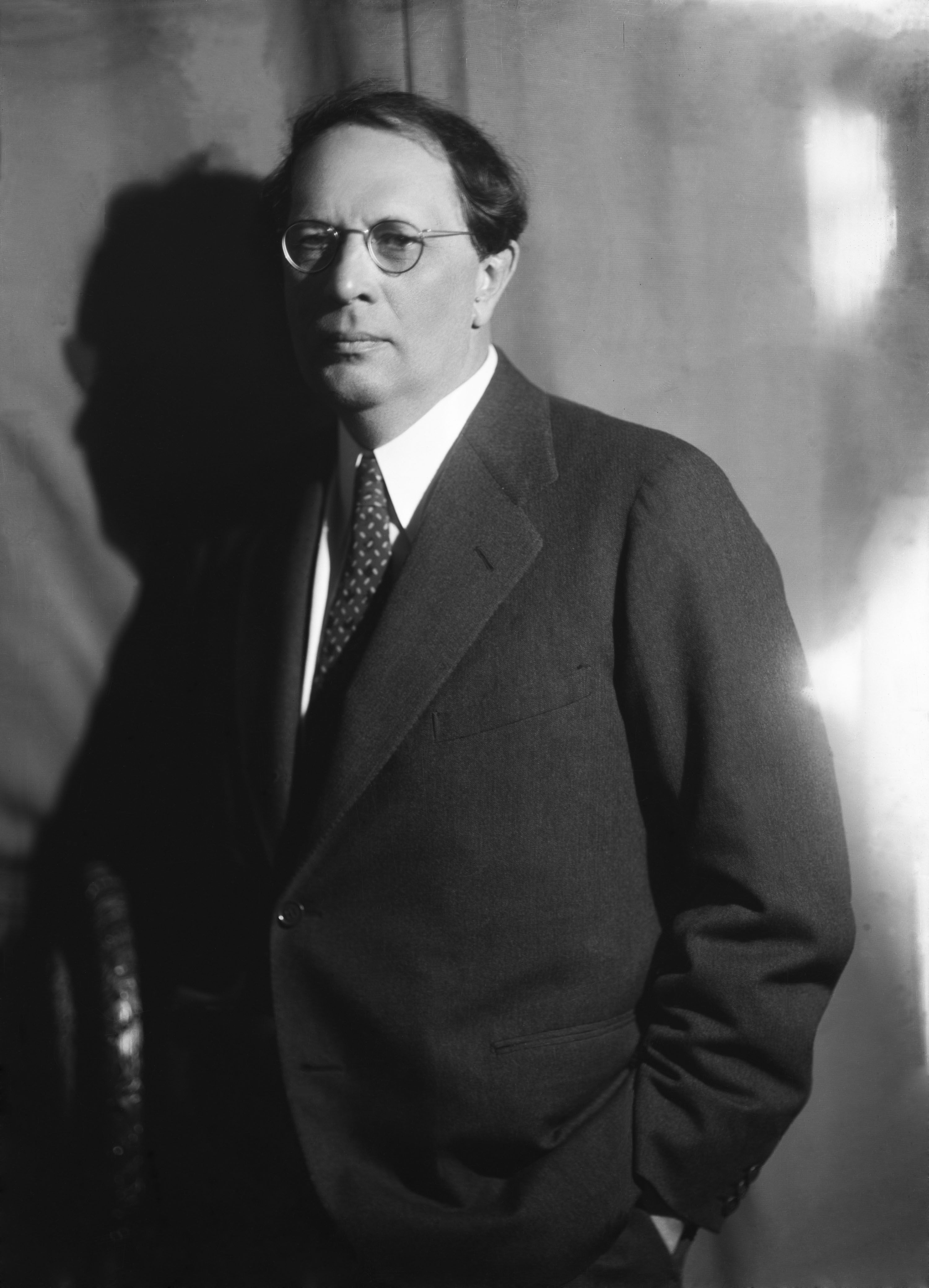
Alexei Tolstoy's Pravda article became instrumental in the life of the symphony, especially with Stalin.

=== In the Soviet Union ===
At the first hearings of the Seventh, most listeners wept. This was true even when Shostakovich played the piece on the piano for friends. The requiem pages of the first movement made a special impression, much as the Largo of his Fifth Symphony had done. Some scholars believe that, as he had done in the Fifth, Shostakovich gave his audience a chance to express thoughts and suffering that, in the context of the Great Purges, had remained hidden and accumulated over many years. Because these previously hidden emotions were expressed with such power and passion, the Seventh became a major public event. Alexei Tolstoy, who played a pivotal role in the life of the Fifth Symphony, was the first to note the significance of the spontaneous reaction to the Seventh. After hearing an orchestral rehearsal of it, Tolstoy wrote a highly positive review of the work for Pravda.

Tolstoy's actions became instrumental in the life of the Seventh. His interpretation of the Seventh aligned with Stalin's support of nationalism and patriotism. At least as important was that without the help of the United States and the United Kingdom, the Soviet Union could not overcome Nazi Germany. The Soviets had been seen not long ago in the Western press as godless villains and barbarians. Now the Americans and British had to believe the Soviet Union was helping protect the values those countries cherished from fascism for the Soviets to continue receiving those countries' support.

The Seventh was performed and broadcast all over the Soviet Union. Magazines and newspapers continued printing stories about it. The piece continued having enormous success. People still wept at concerts. They often rose from their seats during the finale and applauded thunderously afterward.

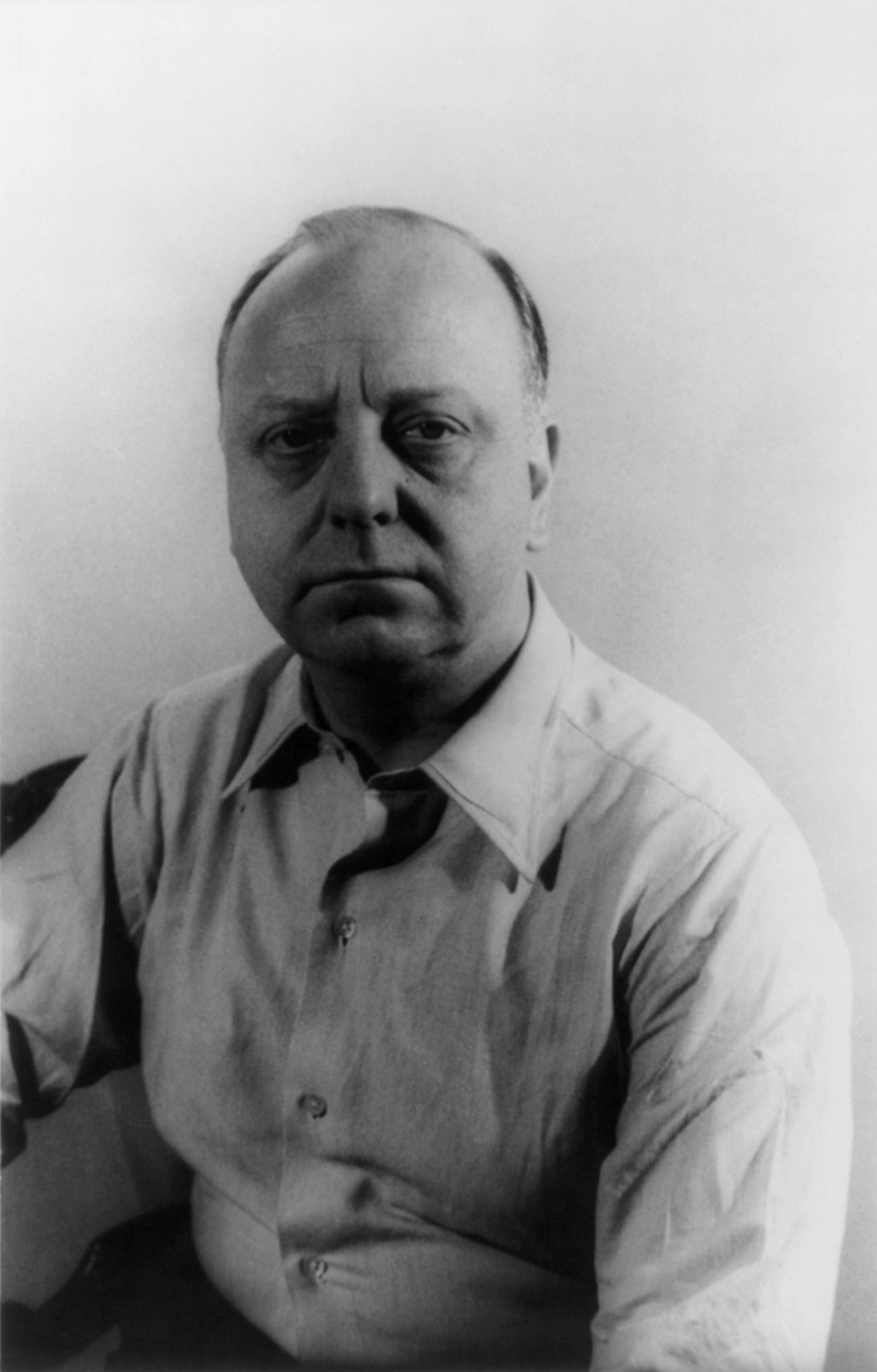
Virgil Thomson called the symphony "written for the slow-witted, the not very musical and the distracted".

=== In the West ===
Shostakovich had been known in the West before the war. When news of the Seventh quickly spread in the British and American press, his popularity soared. During the war, the work was popular both in the West and in the Soviet Union as the embodiment of the fighting Russian spirit. The American premiere, in July 1942, was by the NBC Symphony Orchestra conducted by Arturo Toscanini, broadcast on radio by NBC and preserved on transcription discs; RCA issued the recording on LP in 1967 and later reissued it on CD. The symphony was played 62 times in the United States in the 1942–43 season.

Shostakovich's contemporaries were dismayed, even angered, by its lack of subtlety, crudity, and overblown dramatics. Virgil Thomson wrote, "It seems to have been written for the slow-witted, the not very musical and the distracted", adding that if Shostakovich continued writing in this manner, it might "eventually disqualify him for consideration as a serious composer". Sergei Rachmaninoff's only comment after hearing the American premiere on the radio was a grim "Well, and now let's have some tea."

Disdainful remarks about the symphony being nothing more than a bombastic accompaniment for a bad war movie were voiced immediately after the London and New York premieres, but in the cultural and political ear of the period, they had no effect. The American public-relations machine had joined Soviet propaganda in portraying the Seventh as a symbol of cooperation and spiritual unity of both peoples in their fight against the Nazis.

=== Decline in appreciation ===
Once the novelty of the Seventh Symphony had worn away, audience interest in the West quickly dissipated. One reason may have been the work's length. At 70-80 minutes, it was longer than any previous Shostakovich symphony. It could be argued that the symphony could have been made 30 minutes shorter by condensing his message, but the long passages of sparsely accompanied solos for wind instruments give listeners the opportunity to study them and appreciate the inner character of the music as each instrument soliloquises on a given mood. To do this to the extent that Shostakovich did, combined with a wordless narrative style of mood-painting, necessitated an expansive time frame. This extended time span was criticized by some, including B. H. Haggin, who called the symphony "pretentious in style as in length". Hearing it only in the context of wartime propaganda, Western critics dismissed the symphony as a series of bombastic platitudes and not worth serious consideration. The critic Ernest Newman famously remarked that, to find its place on the musical map, one should look along the seventieth degree of longitude and the last degree of platitude.

The Seventh Symphony was a convenient target from the start for Western critics. It was considered a strange, ungainly hybrid of Mahler and Stravinsky—too long, too broad-gestured in narrative and overly emotional. Shostakovich placed the work's emphasis on the effect of musical images rather than on symphonic coherence. Those images—stylized fanfares, march rhythms, ostinati, folkloric themes, and pastoral episodes—could easily be considered models of socialist realism. Because of his emphasis on these images, Shostakovich can be said to have allowed the work's message to outweigh its craftsmanship. For all these reasons, the music was considered both naïve and calculated in the West.

Soviet audiences did not come to the music with the same expectations as Western listeners. What mattered to Soviet listeners was the message and its serious moral content. The Seventh maintained its position with that audience because its content was so momentous. Nevertheless, as early as 1943 Soviet critics claimed the "exultation" of the Seventh's finale was unconvincing, pointing out that the part of the symphony they found most effective—the march in the opening movement—represented not the defending Red Army but the Nazi invaders. They believed that Shostakovich's pessimism had short-circuited what might have otherwise been a masterpiece in the vein of the 1812 Overture. The tragic mood of Shostakovich's next symphony, the Eighth, intensified the critical discord. Later, negative views from the West prejudiced the thinking of the Soviet elite toward the Seventh.

=== Re-evaluation ===
When Testimony was published in the West in 1979, Shostakovich's overall anti-Stalinist tone and specific comments about the anti-totalitarian content hidden in the Fifth, Seventh and Eleventh Symphonies were held suspect initially. They were in some ways a complete about-face from the comments the West had received over the years, many times in the composer's words. Questions also arose over Solomon Volkov's role—to what degree he was a compiler of previously written material, a transcriber of the composer's actual words from interviews, or an author essentially putting words into the composer's mouth.

Two things happened. First, the composer's son Maxim told the Sunday Times, after his defection to the West in 1981, that Testimony was "about my father, not by him". Later, though, he reversed his position. In a BBC television interview with composer Michael Berkeley on 27 September 1986, Maxim said: "It's true. It's accurate. ... The basis of the book is correct." Second, with the dawning of glasnost, those who were still alive and had known Shostakovich when he wrote the Leningrad Symphony could share their stories with impunity. By doing so, they helped corroborate what had appeared in Testimony, allowing the West to reevaluate the symphony in light of their statements.

In recent years, the Seventh Symphony has again become more popular, along with the rest of Shostakovich's work.

== Legacy ==
It has been alleged that Béla Bartók quoted the march theme of the first movement in the "Intermezzo interrotto" of his Concerto for Orchestra in response to the Hungarian composer's frustration about the positive reception of the piece. The quotation is clearly the "invasion" theme, and Bartók interjects his romantic and lyrical melody in the movement with a much slower interpretation of Shostakovich's invasion ostinato. The resemblance has been variously interpreted by later commentators as an accusation of tastelessness, as a commentary on the symphony's over-popularity in Bartók's eyes, and as an acknowledgement of the position of the artist in a totalitarian society. But it is much more likely that Bartók (as his pianist friend György Sándor has said) was, like Shostakovich, parodying the popular Lehár theme directly. This view has been confirmed by Bartók's son Peter, in his book "My father": Bartók respected and admired Shostakovich's works, and was mocking Lehár's music and behind it the Nazis.

Janet Sobel's painting "Music" was inspired by the symphony. She told Sidney Janis that the painting was her impression of the music that Shostakovich created in wartime: "Shostakovich has captured the power of the Russian people and by his music has given them strength. His music has so stimulated me, and I have tried to present these feelings in my picture."

In the Ken Russell film Billion Dollar Brain (1967), music from the Leningrad Symphony accompanies the failed military invasion of the Latvian Soviet Socialist Republic by Texas millionaire Midwinter (a pivotal scene reflecting the Battle of the Neva from Aleksandr Nevsky). Earlier on, Michael Caine as Harry Palmer attends the end of a concert of what is claimed to be the Leningrad Symphony, whereas in fact the finale from Shostakovich's Eleventh Symphony is heard.

American rock band Fall Out Boy also used elements of Symphony No. 7 in their song "The Phoenix" from their 2013 album Save Rock and Roll. The same sample had been used by the German hip hop artist Peter Fox in his song "Alles neu" in 2008, and by Plan B in "Ill Manors" in 2012.

In 2015, M. T. Anderson wrote a book titled Symphony for the City of the Dead, a biography of both Shostakovich and Symphony No. 7. The book won several awards, including the Wall Street Journal's Best Book of the Year.

== Film version ==
On 31 January 2005, a film version of the Symphony premiered in St. Petersburg, with the St. Petersburg Academic Symphony Orchestra, conducted by Shostakovich's son Maxim Shostakovich, accompanying a film directed by Georgy Paradzhanov, constructed from documentary materials, including film of the siege of Leningrad. Many survivors of the siege were guests at the performance. The composer's widow Irina acted as script consultant to the project and its musical advisors included Rudolf Barshai and Boris Tishchenko. The film and performance were repeated, with the same artists, in London on 9 May 2005 at the Royal Albert Hall.
