= Judah Bezalel Eliasberg =

Russian Hebrew writer and translator (1800–1847)

Judah Bezalel ben Ze'ev Wolf Eliasberg (Hebrew: יְהוּדָה בְּצַלְאֵל בֵּן זְאֵב וואָלף עליאַשבערג; 1800 in Ivenitz, Russia – 1847 in Minsk, Russia) was a Hebrew writer and translator. He translated from Polish to Hebrew the medical work of Friedrich Felix Pauliczki, published in 1834 under the title Marpe le-Am ('Healing for the Populace').
