= Free bowing =

Unsynchronized orchestral bow strokes

In a symphony orchestra, free bowing is a performance technique used by a string section to create a fuller sound than can be achieved by synchronized bowing.

== History ==
Free bowing was popularized by Leopold Stokowski, who as conductor of the Philadelphia Orchestra experimented with many musical conventions.

=== Technique ===
It is standard practice for members of each string section to bow (i.e. to draw the bow back and forth across the strings) in unison, usually following directions inscribed on the sheet music by the concertmaster. Under free bowing, however, the string members each determine individually the best way to play a set of notes, collectively producing a deeper sound, free of mechanical restriction.

Free bowing is rarely used today in Western classical music because of its lack of communal focus, which can cause musicians to play out of step with each other. The Philadelphia Orchestra, with whom it was associated, discontinued the practice after Eugene Ormandy succeeded Stokowski as conductor. However, the practice is common with orchestras that perform Arabic classical music.

=== Legacy ===
Michael Daugherty's 2001 composition Bells for Stokowski, commissioned for the Philadelphia Orchestra's centennial, employs free bowing as a tribute to Stokowski.
