= Toscanini (surname) =

Toscanini is a surname. Notable people with the surname include:

- Arturo Toscanini (1867–1957), Italian conductor
- Walter Toscanini (1898–1971), son of Arturo Toscanini
- Wanda Toscanini (1907–1998), daughter of Arturo Toscanini, wife of pianist Vladimir Horowitz
- Yésica Toscanini (born 1986), Argentine fashion model

== See also ==
- Toscanini's, an ice cream parlor in Cambridge, Massachusetts
- Toscanini: The Maestro, a 1985 documentary film about Arturo Toscanini
