= Toscanini: In His Own Words =

2008 documentary

- Directed by: Larry Weinstein
- Written by: Harvey Sachs; Larry Weinstein
- Produced by: Shana Collier; Daniel Iron; Hélène Le Coeur; Claire Lion; Stephen Wright
- Starring: Michael Brandon; Valentina Chico; Carolina Giammetta; Barry Jackson
- Edited by: Robert Swartz; Branko Vasovic
- Production companies: Idéale Audience; Foundry Films; ARTE France; BBC Wales
- Distributed by: Medici.tv
- Release date: 2008
- Running time: 72 minutes
- Country: United States
- Language: English

Toscanini: In His Own Words is a 2008 American documentary drama written and directed by Larry Weinstein, about Italian conductor Arturo Toscanini. It is based on tapes of Toscanini's intimate conversations with his friends, secretly recorded by Toscanini's son, Walter, which had been kept under lock and key for more than 50 years before the film's production.

== Synopsis ==
The film is based on 150 hours of taped interviews secretly recorded by Toscanini's son, Walter, at Toscanini's Wave Hill home, in the Bronx, New York City.

In a fictional New Year's Eve, Toscanini, sitting in his armchair in his living room, is joined for an intimate chat by his relatives and close friends: his son Walter and daughter Wally, his assistant and friend Anita Colombo, Canadian conductor Wilfrid Pelletier, and Iris Cantelli, wife of his protégé Guido. In this fictional conversation are encapsulated the "multiple revelations" of the secretly recorded tapes.

The film juxtaposes the fictional conversation in a warm living room, with Toscanini being portrayed by Barry Jackson, his daughter Wally by Carolina Giammetta, Wilfried Pelletier by Micheal Brandon, and Iris Cantelli by Valentina Chico, with actual kinescopic archival footage filmed between 1932 and 1957, Toscanini's NBC concerts from 1948 to 1952, newsreel, and reconstructed black and white and color video images, functioning as an illustration of Toscanini's words in the conversation.

== Reception ==
The film received two nominations at the 24th Gemini Awards: Best Performing Arts Program or Series, or Arts Documentary Program or Series, and Best Writing in a Documentary Program or Series for Weinstein and Sachs.

== Cast ==
- Michael Brandon as Wilfrid Pelletier
- Iris Cantelli as herself (archival footage)
- Valentina Chico as Iris Cantelli
- Anita Colombo as herself (archival footage)
- Carolina Giammetta as Wally Toscanini
- Jennie Goosens as Anita Colombo
- Barry Jackson as Arturo Toscanini
- Joseph Long as Walter Toscanini
- Wilfried Pelletier as himself (archival footage)
- Arturo Toscanini as himself (archival footage)
- Wally Toscanini as herself (archival footage)
- Walter Toscanini as himself (archival footage)
