= War Sonata =

War Sonata may refer to:

- One of three sonatas by Sergei Prokofiev
  - Piano Sonata No. 6 (Prokofiev) (1940)
  - Piano Sonata No. 7 (Prokofiev) (1942)
  - Piano Sonata No. 8 (Prokofiev) (1944)
- Piano Sonata No. 2 (Kabalevsky) (1945), by Dmitry Kabalevsky
- Ninth Sonata in A minor, Op. 30 (circa 1914-1917), by Nikolai Medtner
- Sonate (D-Dur) (Kriegssonate) für Klavier, Op. 19, by Botho Sigwart zu Eulenburg (died September 1915)
