= Toscanini: The Maestro =

Toscanini: The Maestro is a documentary produced and directed by Peter Rosen, about Italian conductor Arturo Toscanini, who is considered by many to be the greatest maestro of the twentieth century. It was originally created for the Bravo channel in 1985, and was also televised on PBS in January 1988.

Toscanini: The Maestro is the last television program narrated by Alexander Scourby, is hosted by James Levine, and features interviews with former NBC Symphony Orchestra members, as well as reminiscences by opera stars Robert Merrill, Jarmila Novotná, Herva Nelli, Licia Albanese, as well as Bidu Sayão, all of whom worked with Toscanini, and rare color home-movies of the maestro with such musicians as Vladimir Horowitz and Andrés Segovia. Also included is color footage of Salzburg in 1937.

Excerpts from several of Toscanini's television appearances, preserved on black-and-white kinescopes, which at that time were undergoing extensive restoration prior to their release on home video, are also featured, as well as an extensive clip from Hymn of the Nations, a short subject (with Jan Peerce) that Toscanini filmed to support the U.S. war effort in 1944.
