= Grammy Award for Best Classical Performance – Instrumental Soloist or Soloists (with or without orchestra) =

The Grammy Award for Best Classical Performance - Instrumental Soloist or Soloists (with or without orchestra) was awarded from 1967 to 1971 and in 1987. Outside of these years the award has been divided into the Grammy Award for Best Instrumental Soloist(s) Performance (with orchestra) and the Grammy Award for Best Instrumental Soloist Performance (without orchestra).

Years reflect the year in which the Grammy Awards were presented, for works released in the previous year.

== Recipients ==
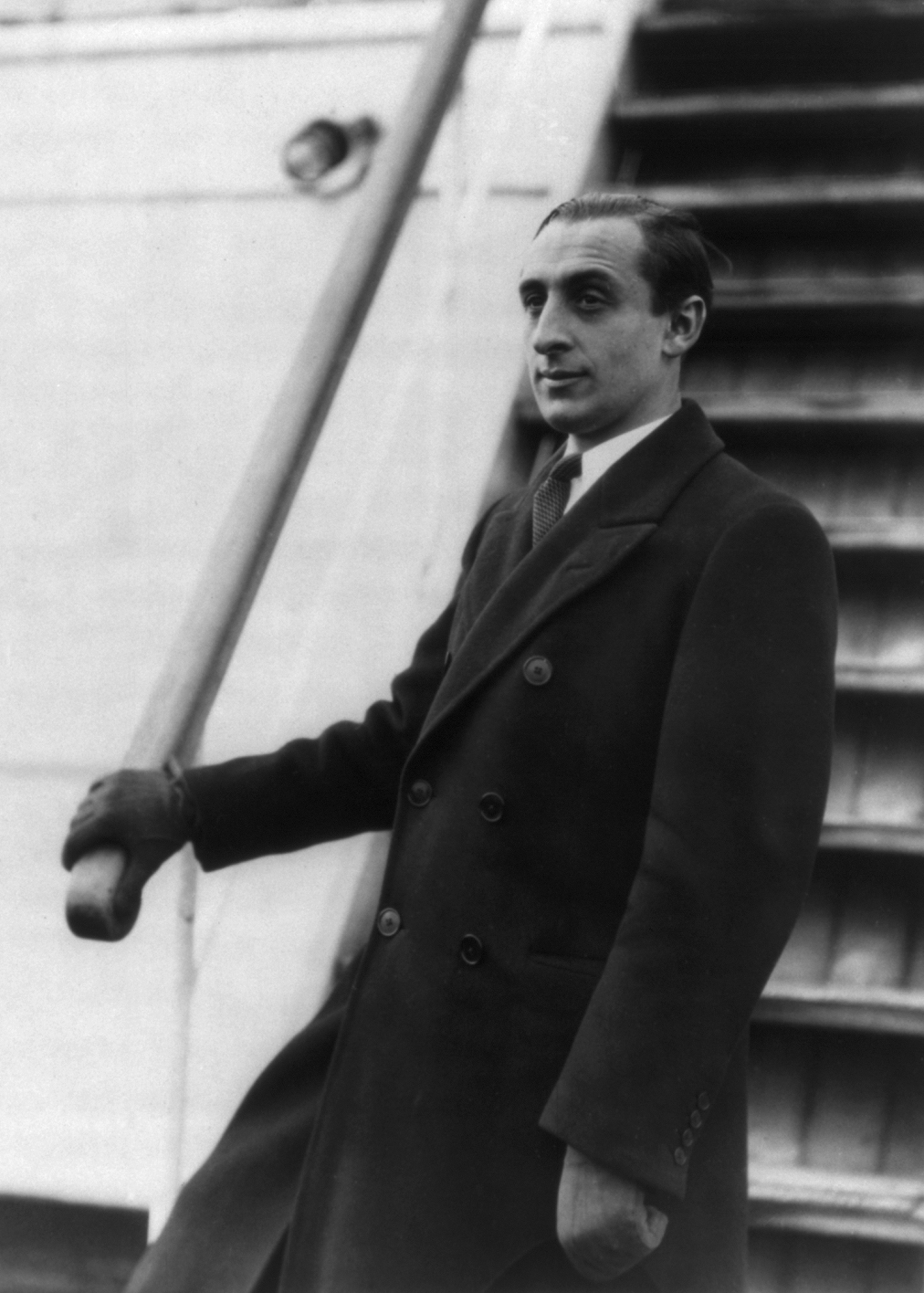
Three-time award recipient Vladimir Horowitz

Nominees of the 9th Grammy Awards (1967) included Julian Bream for Baroque Guitar, pianist John Browning for Prokofiev: Concert No. 1 in D Flat Major for Piano; Concerto No. 2 in G Minor for Piano (conducted by Erich Leinsdorf with the Boston Symphony Orchestra), pianist Raymond Lewenthal for Operatic Liszt, violinist Yehudi Menuhin for Elgar: Concerto for Violin, Ivan Moravec for Chopin: Nocturnes, Arthur Rubinstein for Rubinstein and Chopin (featuring Frédéric Chopin's Bolero, Tarantelle, Fantaisie in F minor and Trois nouvelles études), violinist Isaac Stern for Dvořák: Concerto in A Minor for Violin (conducted by Eugene Ormandy with the Philadelphia Orchestra), and Australian classical guitarist John Williams for Rodrigo: Concierto de Aranjuez for Guitar and Orchestra/Castelnuovo-Tedesco: Concerto in D Major for Guitar (conducted by Ormandy and the Philadelphia Orchestra). Bream received the award for Baroque Guitar, which featured pieces by Johann Sebastian Bach, Gaspar Sanz, Silvius Leopold Weiss and other composers.

Year	Winner(s)	Title	Nominees	Ref.
1967	Julian Bream	Baroque Guitar	John Browning, pianist; Erich Leinsdorf, conductor for Prokofiev: Concert No. 1 in D Flat Major for Piano; Concerto No. 2 in G Minor for Piano; Raymond Lewenthal for Operatic Liszt; Yehudi Menuhin for Elgar: Concerto for Violin; Ivan Moravec for Chopin: Nocturnes; Arthur Rubinstein for Rubinstein and Chopin; Isaac Stern, violinist; Eugene Ormandy, conductor for Dvořák: Concerto in A Minor for Violin; John Williams, guitarist; Eugene Ormandy, conductor for Rodrigo: Concierto de Aranjuez for Guitar and Orchestra/Castelnuovo-Tedesco: Concerto in D Major for Guitar	
1968	Vladimir Horowitz	Horowitz in Concert (Haydn, Schumann, Scriabin, Debussy, Mozart, Chopin)	Julian Bream for 20th Century Guitar (Words by Brindle, Britten, Villa-Lobos, Martin, Henze); Arthur Rubinstein for Chopin: Nocturnes; Alicia de Larrocha for Granados: Goyescas Completo/Escenas Romanticas; William Masselos for Ives: Sonata No. 1 for Piano; Andrés Segovia for Segovia on Stage	
1969	Vladimir Horowitz	Horowitz on Television (Chopin, Scriabin, Scarlatti, Horowitz)	Arthur Rubinstein, soloist; Chicago Symphony; Carlo Maria Giulini, conductor for Schumann: Concerto in A Minor for Piano and Orchestra; Arthur Grumiaux, soloist; Concertgebouw Orchestra; Igor Markevitch, conductor for Berg: Concerto for Violin and Orchestra; John Ogdon, soloist; Royal Philharmonic; Daniell Revenaugh, conductor for Busoni: Concerto for Piano with Male Chorus	
1970	Wendy Carlos	Switched-On Bach	Henryk Szeryng for Bach: Sonatas and Partitas for Solo Violin; Mstislav Rostropovich, soloist; Berlin Philharmonic; Herbert von Karajan, conductor for Dvořák: Concerto in B Minor for Cello; Emil Gilels for Gilels at Carnegie Hall; John Kirkpatrick for Ives: Sonata No. 2 (Concord Mass); Edward Druzinsky, soloist; Chicago Symphony; Martinon, conductor for Ravel: Introduction and Allegro for Harp and Strings	
1971	David Oistrakh, Mstislav Rostropovich, soloists; Cleveland Orchestra; George Szell, conductor	Brahms: Double Concerto (Concerto in A Minor for Violin and Cello)	Glenn Gould for Bach: The Well-Tempered Clavier, Book 2, Nos. 9-16; Alexis Weissenberg, soloist; Philadelphia Symphony; Eugene Ormandy, conductor for Bartok: Concerto No. 2 for Piano; Emil Gilels for Gilels at Carnegie Hall; Ivan Moravec for Beethoven: Sonatas No. 26, Op. 81a (Les Adieux), and No. 15, Op. 28 (Pastoral); David Oistrakh, soloist; Cleveland Orchestra; George Szell, conductor for Brahms: Concerto in D Major for Violin	
1987	Vladimir Horowitz	Howoritz - The Studio Recordings, New York '85	András Schiff for Bach: The Well-Tempered Clavier, Book 1; Claudio Arrau, soloist; Dresden State Orchestra; Andrew Davis, conductor for Beethoven: Piano Concerto No. 5 in E Flat (Emperor); Adolph Herseth, soloist; Chicago Symphony; Claudio Abbado, conductor for Haydn: Trumpet Concerto in E Flat; Dale Clevenger, soloist; Chicago Symphony; Claudio Abbado, conductor for Mozart: Horn Concertos; Wynton Marsalis, soloist; Philharmonic Orchestra; Esa-Pekka Salonen, conductor for Tomasi: Concerto for Trumpet and Orchestra; Jolivet: Concerto No. 2 for Trumpet; Concertino for Trumpet	
