= Piano Sonata No. 2 (Kabalevsky) =

Dmitry Kabalevsky's Piano Sonata No. 2 in E♭ major, Op. 45, was composed in 1945 and dedicated to Emil Gilels. It is the most vast and dramatic of Kabalevsky's three sonatas. A War Sonata such as Sergei Prokofiev's trilogy, its first movement has been compared to that of Dmitri Shostakovich's Symphony No. 7.

Vladimir Horowitz delivered its US première on February 3, 1947 at Carnegie Hall.

It is in three movements:

1. Allegro moderato. Festivamente – Allegro molto – Festivamente (poco piú mosso del tempo I) – Largamente, drammatico
2. Andante sostenuto – Pochissimo piú mosso – Tempo I
3. Presto assai
