= Harvey Sachs =

American writer and music historian (born 1946)

Harvey Sachs (born June 8, 1946 in Cleveland, Ohio) is an American-Canadian writer and music historian who has written books on musical subjects. He has been a member of the Curtis Institute of Music faculty since 2009.

== Writing ==
His books include biographies of and a book of essays on the Italian conductor Arturo Toscanini, plus an edited collection of Toscanini's letters.

- Toscanini, Philadelphia & New York: J. B. Lippincott, 1978.
- Reflections on Toscanini, New York: Grove Weidenfeld, 1991.
- The Letters of Arturo Toscanini, ed., New York: Knopf, 2002.
- Toscanini: Musician of Conscience, New York: Liveright Publishing Corporation, 2017.

Ten Masterpieces of Music deals with works in ten different genres by ten different composers: Mozart, Beethoven, Schubert, Schumann, Berlioz, Verdi, Brahms, Sibelius, Prokofiev, and Stravinsky; it provides descriptive analyses of the ten compositions plus commentary on and historical background to the life of each composer (Ten Masterpieces of Music, New York: Liveright, 2021). Sachs has also written books on musical virtuosi, a history of music in Italy during the fascist period, a biography of Arthur Rubinstein, and a book on Beethoven's Ninth Symphony that is part cultural history, part musical description, and part personal memoir:

- Virtuoso, London, New York: Thames & Hudson, 1982.
- Music in Fascist Italy, New York: W. W. Norton, 1988.
- Rubinstein: A Life, New York: Grove Press, 1995.
- The Ninth: Beethoven and the World in 1824, New York: Random House, 2010.
- Ten Masterpieces of Music, New York: Liveright, 2021

He has written Schoenberg: Why He Matters, an interpretive biography, which was published by Liveright, New York, in 2023. It was reviewed by composer John Adams.

Sachs also co-authored the memoirs of Plácido Domingo and Sir Georg Solti:

- Domingo, Plácido, My First Forty Years, New York: Knopf, 1983.
- Solti, Georg, Memoirs, New York: Knopf, 1997.

Sachs has written pieces for periodicals that include The New Yorker, The New York Times, the Wall Street Journal, the Times [London] Literary Supplement, Il Sole 24 Ore, and La Stampa; and record companies that include Deutsche Grammophon and RCA/Sony Classics.

== Work ==
From 2011 to 2013, Sachs was the Leonard Bernstein Scholar-in-Residence of the New York Philharmonic.
