= Arturo Toscanini =

Italian conductor (1867–1957)

Maestro Arturo Toscanini
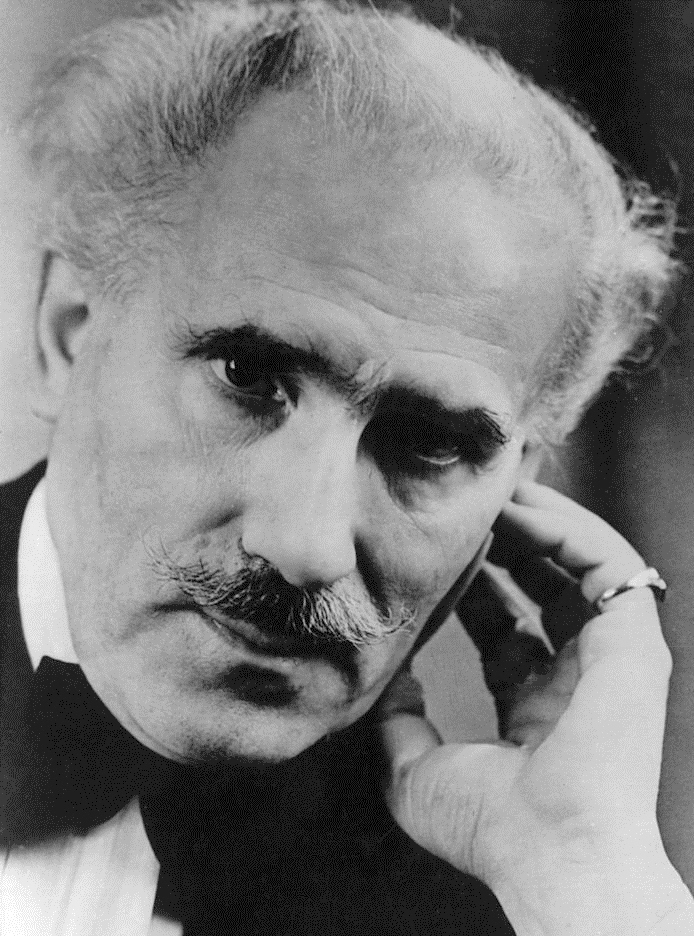
- Toscanini, c. 1930s
- Born: March 25, 1867; Parma, Italy
- Died: January 16, 1957 (aged 89); New York City, U.S.
- Occupation: Conductor
- Years active: 1886–1954
- Spouse: Carla de Martini (m. 1897; died 1951)
- Children: 3, including Walter and Wanda

Arturo Toscanini (/ɑːrˈtʊəroʊ ˌtɒskəˈniːni/; Italian: [arˈtuːro toskaˈniːni]; March 25, 1867 – January 16, 1957) was an Italian conductor. One of the most acclaimed and influential musicians of the late 19th and early 20th century, Toscanini was renowned for his intensity, his perfectionism, his ear for orchestral detail and sonority, and his eidetic memory. He was at various times the music director of La Scala in Milan and the New York Philharmonic. Later in his career, he was appointed the first music director of the NBC Symphony Orchestra (1937–1954), and this led to his becoming a household name, especially in the United States, through his radio and television broadcasts and many recordings of the operatic and symphonic repertoire.

== Biography ==
=== Early years ===
Toscanini was born in Parma, Emilia-Romagna. His father was a tailor. He won a scholarship to the Parma Conservatory, where he studied the cello. Living conditions at the conservatory were harsh and strict. For example, the menu at the conservatory consisted almost entirely of fish; in his later years, Toscanini steadfastly refused to eat anything that came from the sea.

He joined the orchestra of an Italian opera company organized by Claudio Rossi and Carlo Superti as principal cellist, with which he toured Brazil in 1886. After performing in São Paulo, the locally hired conductor, Leopoldo Miguez relinquished the post a few hours before the performance of Aida in Rio de Janeiro on June 25, telling the newspapers that his decision had been caused by the behavior of the orchestra, who apparently thought that Miguez was inadequate to conduct opera (reviews of his performance in São Paulo reflected the orchestra's sentiment). Desperate, Superti (who was also a conductor), attempted to take Miguez's place as conductor for the performance. But the public, who believed that Miguez's resignation had been caused by prejudice on behalf of the Italians against Brazilian artists, booed Superti so violently that he couldn't even give the signal for the orchestra to start playing. Superti eventually left the podium and got onstage with Rossi (his fellow impresario) to try and calm the public by explaining the situation. He was pretty much ignored and the booing got worse. When it seemed that the performance was destined to be a fiasco, the then 19 year-old Toscanini got up from his seat in the orchestra, walked over to the conductor's podium and signaled for the orchestra to begin playing. The public, surprised by the young man's bold move, stopped booing, and Toscanini began conducting. He ended up conducting the entire opera by memory.

The public was taken by surprise, at first by the youth, charisma and sheer intensity of this unknown conductor, then by his solid musicianship. The result was astounding acclaim. For the rest of that season, Toscanini conducted 18 operas, each one an absolute success. Thus began his career as a conductor, at age 19.

Upon returning to Italy, Toscanini set out on a dual path. He continued to conduct, his first appearance in Italy being at the Teatro Carignano in Turin, on November 4, 1886, in the world premiere of the revised version of Alfredo Catalani's Edmea (it had its premiere in its original form at La Scala, Milan, on February 27, of that year). This was the beginning of Toscanini's lifelong friendship and championing of Catalani; he even named his first daughter Wally after the heroine of Catalani's opera La Wally. He also returned to his chair in the cello section, and participated as cellist in the world premiere of Verdi's Otello (La Scala, Milan, 1887) under the composer's supervision.

Verdi, who habitually complained that conductors never seemed interested in directing his scores the way he had written them, was impressed by reports from Arrigo Boito about Toscanini's ability to interpret his scores. The composer was also impressed when Toscanini consulted him personally about Verdi's Te Deum, suggesting an allargando where it was not set out in the score. Verdi said that he had left it out for fear that "certain interpreters would have exaggerated the marking".

=== National and international fame ===
Gradually, Toscanini's reputation as an operatic conductor of unusual authority and skill supplanted his cello career. In the following decade, he consolidated his career in Italy, entrusted with the world premieres of Puccini's La bohème and Leoncavallo's Pagliacci. In 1896, Toscanini conducted his first symphonic concert (in Turin, with works by Schubert, Brahms, Tchaikovsky, and Wagner). He exhibited a considerable capacity for hard work, conducting 43 concerts in Turin in 1898. By 1898, Toscanini was principal conductor at La Scala, where he remained until 1908, returning as music director, from 1921 to 1929. In December 1920, he brought the La Scala Orchestra to the United States on a concert tour, during which time he made his first recordings for the Victor Talking Machine Company in Camden, New Jersey.

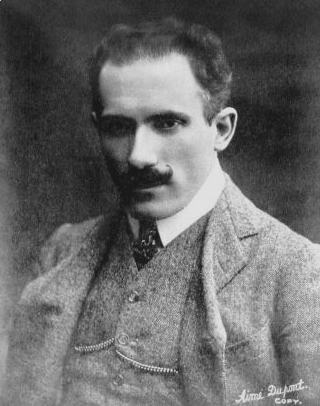
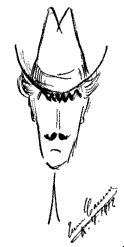
Left: Toscanini in 1908; right: Caricature of Toscanini drawn by Enrico Caruso

In 1908, Toscanini became principal conductor of the Metropolitan Opera in New York, arriving with Giulio Gatti-Casazza who left La Scala to assume the post as the Met's general manager. During Toscanini's seven seasons at the Met (1908–1915), he made several reforms and set many standards in opera production and performance which are still in practice today. At the end of his final season with the Metropolitan Opera in May 1915, Toscanini was set to return to Europe aboard the doomed RMS Lusitania, but instead cut his concert schedule short and left a week early, aboard the Italian liner Duca degli Abruzzi. Toscanini conducted the New York Philharmonic from 1926 until 1936; he toured Europe with the philharmonic in 1930. At each performance, he and the orchestra were acclaimed by both critics and audiences. Toscanini was the first non-German conductor to appear at Bayreuth (1930–1931), and the New York Philharmonic was the first non-German orchestra to play there.

In the 1930s, he conducted at the Salzburg Festival (1934–1937), as well as the 1936 inaugural concert of the Palestine Orchestra (later renamed the Israel Philharmonic Orchestra) in Tel Aviv, later conducting them in Jerusalem, Haifa, Cairo and Alexandria. During his engagement with the New York Philharmonic, his concert master was Hans Lange, the son of the last Master of the Sultan's Music in Istanbul, who, later, became conductor of the Chicago Symphony Orchestra and the founder of the New Mexico Symphony Orchestra as a professional ensemble.

During his career as an opera conductor, Toscanini collaborated with such artists as Enrico Caruso, Feodor Chaliapin, Ezio Pinza, Giovanni Martinelli, Geraldine Farrar and Aureliano Pertile.

=== Departure from Italy to the United States ===
In 1919, Toscanini unsuccessfully ran on the Fascist ticket for a minor municipal office in Milan. (The Fascist Party was not openly authoritarian at that time.) He had been called "the greatest conductor in the world" by Fascist leader Benito Mussolini. Toscanini had already become disillusioned with Fascism before the October 1922 March on Rome and repeatedly defied the Italian dictator. He refused to display Mussolini's photograph or conduct the Fascist anthem Giovinezza at La Scala. He raged to a friend, "If I were capable of killing a man, I would kill Mussolini."

At a memorial concert for Italian composer Giuseppe Martucci on May 14, 1931, at the Teatro Comunale in Bologna, Toscanini was ordered to begin by playing Giovinezza, but he flatly refused, despite the presence of fascist communications minister Costanzo Ciano in the audience. Afterwards, he was, in his own words, "attacked, injured and repeatedly hit in the face" by a group of Blackshirts. Mussolini, incensed by the conductor's refusal, had his phone tapped, placed him under constant surveillance, and confiscated his passport. His passport was returned only after a world outcry over Toscanini's treatment. Upon the outbreak of World War II, Toscanini left Italy. He returned in 1946 to conduct a concert for the opening of the restored La Scala Opera House, which was heavily damaged by bombing during the war.

=== NBC Symphony Orchestra ===
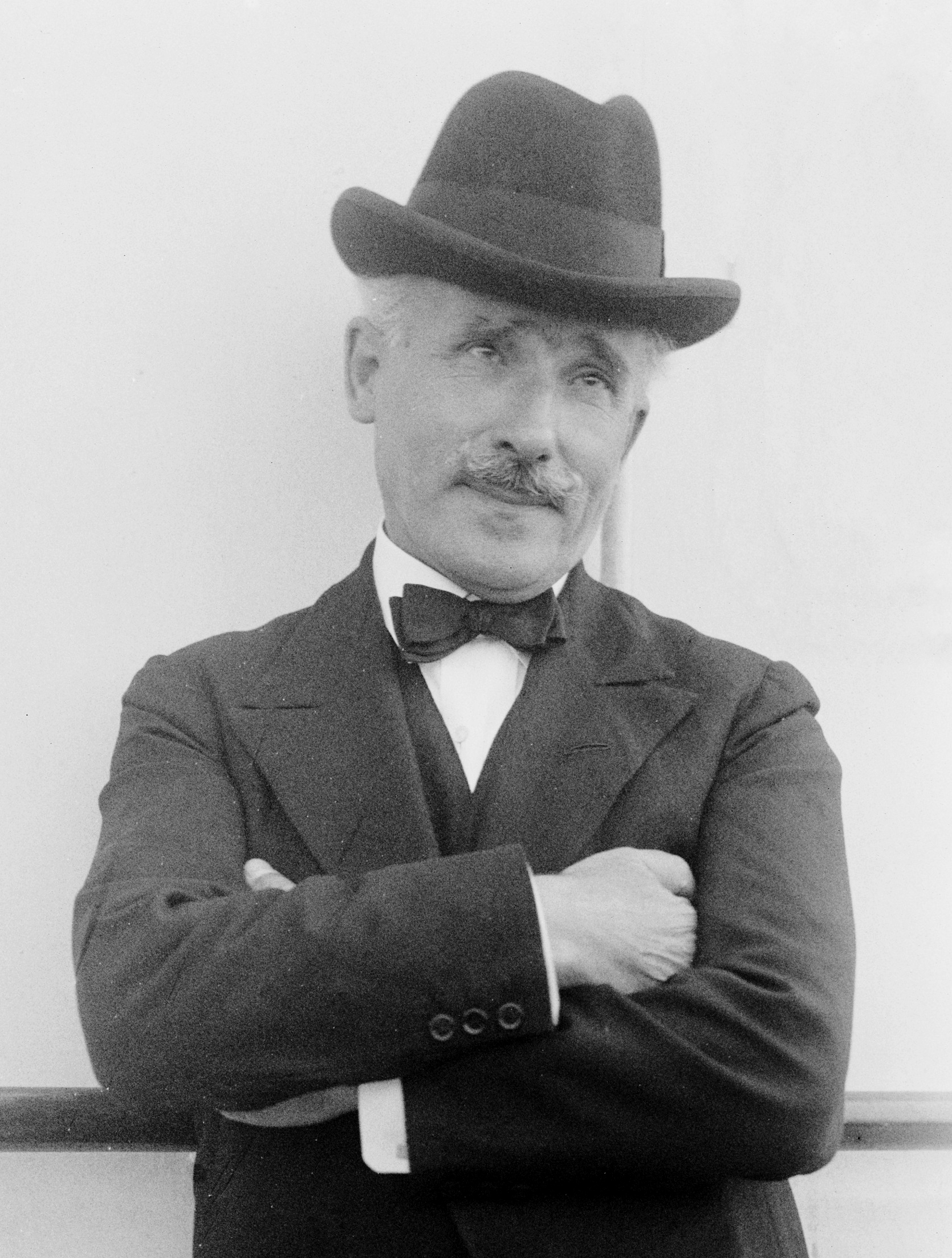
Toscanini in 1926

In 1936, Toscanini resigned from the New York Philharmonic, returned to Italy and was considering retirement; David Sarnoff, president of the Radio Corporation of America (RCA), proposed creating a symphony orchestra for radio concerts and engaging Toscanini to conduct it. Toscanini was initially uninterested in the proposal, but Sarnoff sent Toscanini's friend Samuel Chotzinoff to visit the conductor in Milan; Chotzinoff was able to persuade the wary Toscanini to accept Sarnoff's offer. Toscanini returned to the United States to conduct his first broadcast concert with the NBC Symphony Orchestra on December 25, 1937, in NBC Studio 8-H in New York City's Rockefeller Center. The infamous dry acoustics of the specially built radio studio gave the orchestra, as heard on early broadcasts and recordings, a harsh, flat quality; some remodeling in 1942, at Leopold Stokowski's insistence, added a bit more reverberation. In 1950, 8-H was converted into a television studio, and the NBC Symphony broadcast concerts were moved to Carnegie Hall. Studio 8-H has been home to NBC's Saturday Night Live since 1975. In January 1980, Zubin Mehta and the New York Philharmonic began a series of special televised NBC concerts called Live From Studio 8H, the first one being a tribute to Toscanini, punctuated by clips from his NBC television concerts.

The NBC broadcasts were initially preserved on large 16-inch transcription discs recorded at 33-1/3 rpm, until NBC began using magnetic tape in 1949. NBC employed special RCA high fidelity microphones for the broadcasts, and they can be seen in some photographs of Toscanini and the orchestra. Some of Toscanini's recording sessions for RCA Victor were mastered on sound film in a process developed around 1930, as detailed by RCA Victor producer Charles O'Connell in his memoirs, On and Off The Record. In addition, hundreds of hours of Toscanini's rehearsals with the NBC Symphony were preserved and are now housed in the Toscanini Legacy archive at the New York Public Library.

Toscanini was sometimes criticized for neglecting American music, but on November 5, 1938, he conducted the world premieres of two orchestral works by Samuel Barber, Adagio for Strings and Essay for Orchestra. The performance received significant critical acclaim. In 1945, Toscanini led the orchestra in recording sessions for An American in Paris by George Gershwin' and the Grand Canyon Suite by Ferde Grofé, with Grofé in attendance. Both works had previously been performed on broadcast concerts. He also conducted broadcast performances of Copland's El Salón México; Gershwin's Rhapsody in Blue with soloists Earl Wild and Benny Goodman and Piano Concerto in F with pianist Oscar Levant; and music by several other American composers, including some marches of John Philip Sousa. He even wrote his own orchestral arrangement of The Star-Spangled Banner, which was incorporated into the NBC Symphony's performances of Verdi's Hymn of the Nations, together with the Soviet Internationale. (Earlier, while music director of the New York Philharmonic, he conducted music by Abram Chasins, Bernard Wagenaar, and Howard Hanson.)

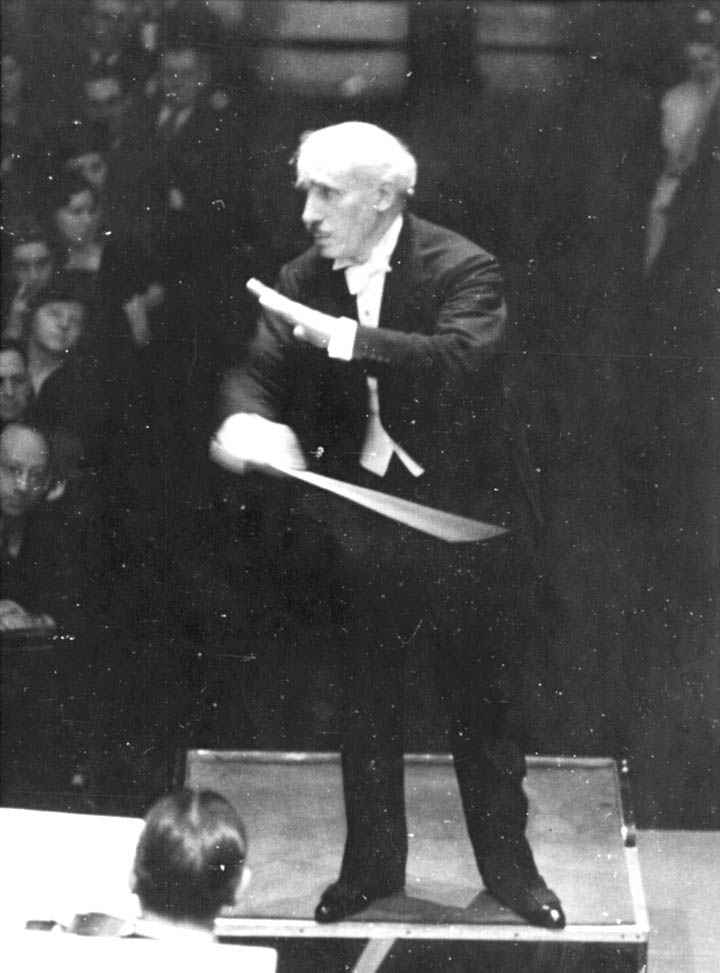
Toscanini conducting the Teatro Colón Orchestra in Buenos Aires during his tour on South America, 1941

In 1940, Toscanini took the NBC Symphony on a tour of South America, sailing from New York on the ocean liner SS Brazil on May 14. Later that year, Toscanini abruptly resigned from the NBC Symphony due to friction with NBC management due to, among other matters, their use of his musicians in other NBC broadcasts. In his letter of resignation to RCA President David Sarnoff, dated March 10, 1941, Toscanini stated that he now wished "to withdraw from the militant scene of Art" and thus declined to sign a new contract for the up-coming winter season, but left the door open for an eventual return "if my state of mind, health and rest will be improved enough". Leopold Stokowski was engaged on a three-year contract to conduct the NBC Symphony and served as music director from 1941 until 1944. Toscanini's state of mind soon underwent a change and he returned to share the podium with Stokowski for the latter's second and third seasons, resuming full control of the NBC Symphony in 1944.

One of the more remarkable broadcasts was in July 1942, when Toscanini conducted the American premiere of Dmitri Shostakovich's Symphony No. 7. Because of World War II, the score was microfilmed in the Soviet Union and brought by courier to the United States. Stokowski had previously given the US premieres of Shostakovich's First, Third and Sixth Symphonies in Philadelphia, and in December 1941, urged NBC to obtain the score of the Seventh Symphony as he desired to conduct its premiere as well. Toscanini coveted this for himself resulting in a dispute between both conductors which he ultimately won. A major thunderstorm virtually obliterated the NBC radio signals in New York City, but the performance was heard elsewhere and preserved on transcription discs. RCA Victor first issued the recording on LP in 1967, and on compact disc in 1991. In Toscanini's later years, the conductor expressed disdain for the work and amazement that he had actually bothered to memorize the music and conduct it.

In the spring of 1950, Toscanini led the NBC Symphony on the orchestra's only extensive tour of the United States. It was during this tour that the well-known photograph of Toscanini riding the ski lift at Sun Valley, Idaho, was taken. Toscanini and the musicians traveled on a special train chartered by NBC.

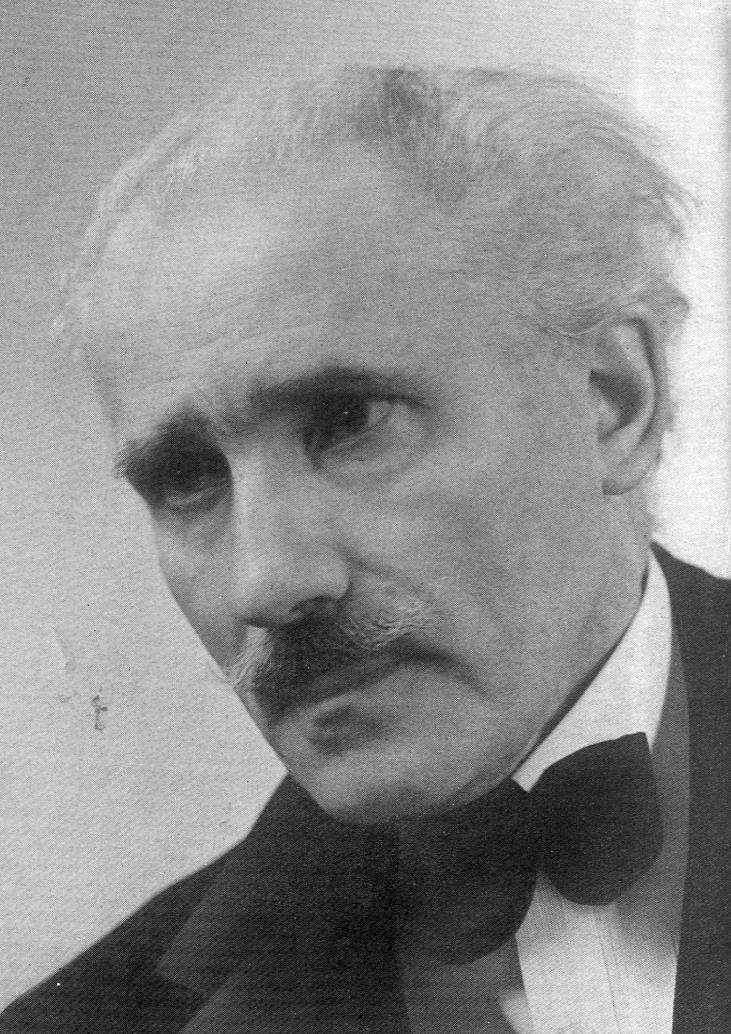
Toscanini, c. 1950

The NBC Symphony concerts continued in Studio 8-H until 1950. That summer, 8-H was remodeled for television broadcasting, and the concerts were moved briefly to Manhattan Center, then soon thereafter moved again to Carnegie Hall at Toscanini's insistence, where many of the orchestra's recording sessions had been held due to the acrid acoustics of Studio 8-H. On April 4, 1954, Toscanini conducted his final broadcast performance, an all-Wagner program, in Carnegie Hall. During this final concert, the aging Toscanini suffered a minor lapse of concentration which became a cause célèbre when broadcast technicians overreacted with panic and took the music off the air for about a minute, substituting Toscanini's recording of the Brahms First Symphony and making the lapse appear to be much worse than it actually was; many people still believe the orchestra stopped playing, but it did not; Toscanini quickly regained his composure and the concert continued.

In June 1954, Toscanini participated in his final RCA Victor sessions, recording re-takes of isolated unsatisfactory passages from his NBC radio broadcasts of the Verdi operas Aida and Un Ballo in Maschera, for release on records. Toscanini was 87 years old when he finally retired. After his retirement in 1954, NBC disbanded the orchestra. Most of the orchestra's membership reorganized as the Symphony of the Air, The ensemble appeared in concert and made recordings until its disbandment in 1963. NBC used the "NBC Symphony Orchestra" name once more for its 1963 telecast of Gian Carlo Menotti's Christmas opera for television, Amahl and the Night Visitors.

Toscanini prepared and conducted seven complete operas for NBC radio broadcasts: Fidelio, La bohème, La Traviata, Otello, Aida, Falstaff and Un Ballo in Maschera (the two-part concert performances of Aida were also broadcast on television). All of these performances were eventually released on records and CD by RCA Victor, thus enabling modern listeners an opportunity to hear what an opera conducted by Toscanini sounded like. He also conducted, broadcast and recorded entire acts and various excerpts from several other operas.

=== Toscanini and Cantelli ===
In May 1948, Toscanini attended a series of rehearsals at La Scala, in which he was flabbergasted by the young conductor leading the orchestra, Guido Cantelli. Toscanini saw in Cantelli "a vision of his younger self", and took him under his protective wing, much like a son. Toscanini invited Cantelli to conduct his own NBC Symphony in New York. In the following years, he developed a strong bond with the Cantellis. In a letter, he predicted to Cantelli's wife, Iris, a bright future for her husband. Cantelli, considered one of the most talented conductors ever, did indeed rise to the point of becoming Music Director of La Scala, en route to becoming director of the New York Philharmonic.

Cantelli was heading to New York to conduct the philharmonic in November 1956, but he died in the Linee Aeree Italiane Flight 451 airplane crash. The Maestro, ailing and past 89 years of age, was waiting for Guido in New York. His family decided not to inform him of the tragedy, fearing the news might kill him. They instead contrived a fake telegram, in which Cantelli informed Toscanini that he had to delay his departure due to an attack of lumbago.

=== Last years ===
With the help of his son Walter, Toscanini spent his last years evaluating and editing tapes and transcriptions of his broadcast performances with the NBC Symphony for possible future release on records. Many of these recordings were eventually issued by RCA Victor.

Sachs and other biographers have documented the numerous conductors, singers, and musicians who visited Toscanini during his retirement. He enjoyed watching boxing and wrestling matches, as well as comedy programs on television.

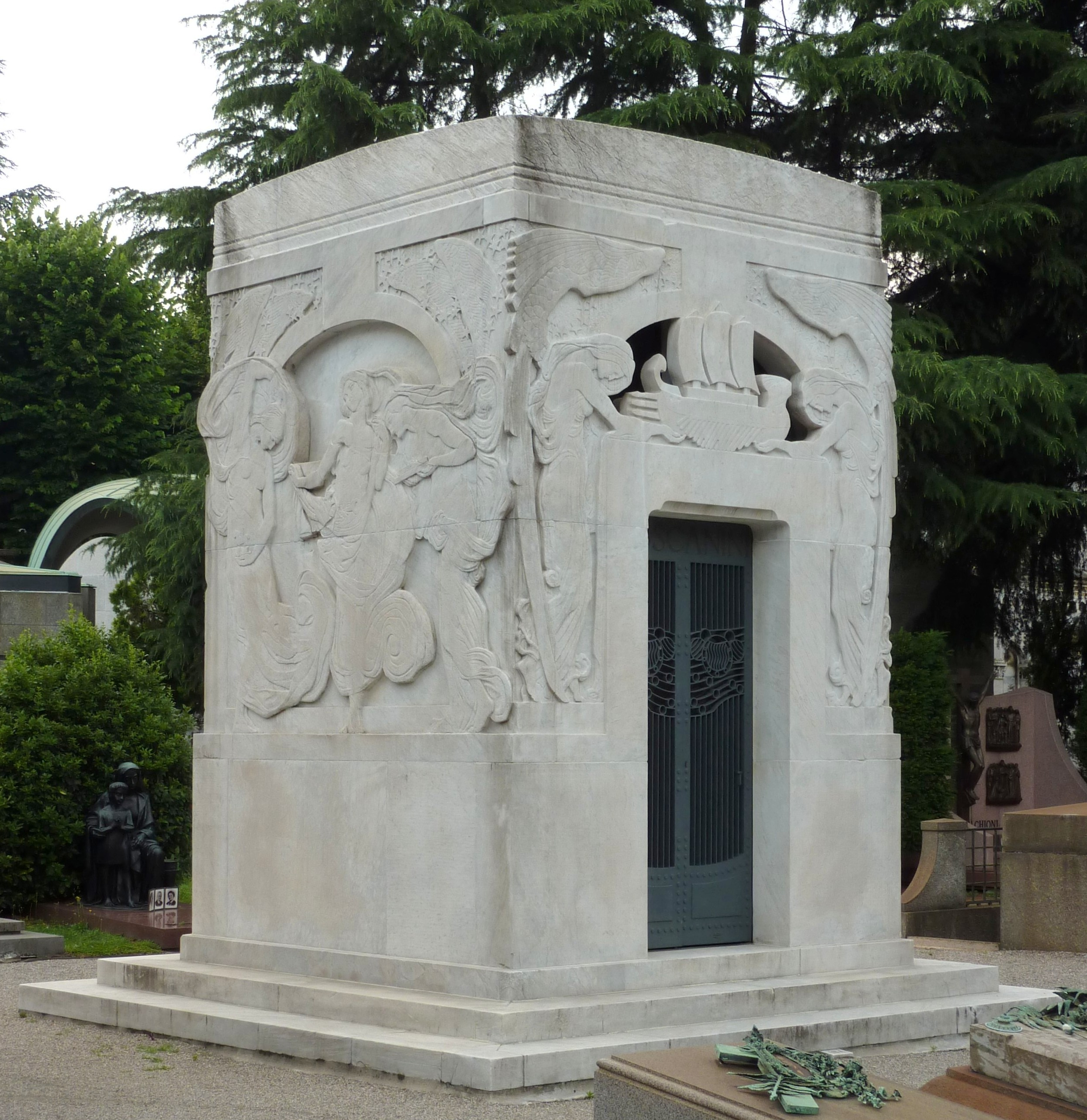
Toscanini's family tomb at the Monumental Cemetery of Milan in 2015

Toscanini suffered a stroke on New Year's Day 1957, and he died on January 16, at the age of 89 at his home in the Riverdale section of the Bronx in New York City. It was his daughter Wally's 57th birthday. Toscanini died 54 days after the death of his protégé Guido Cantelli, never being told of the death of the latter. His body was returned to Italy and was entombed in the Cimitero Monumentale in Milan. His epitaph is taken from one account of his remarks concluding the 1926 premiere of Puccini's unfinished Turandot: "Qui finisce l'opera, perché a questo punto il maestro è morto" ("Here the opera ends, because at this point the maestro died"). During his funeral service, Leyla Gencer sang an excerpt from Verdi's Requiem.

In his will, he left his baton to his protégée Herva Nelli, who sang in the broadcasts of Otello, Aida, Falstaff, the Verdi Requiem, and Un ballo in maschera.

Toscanini was posthumously awarded the Grammy Lifetime Achievement Award in 1987.

== Personal life ==
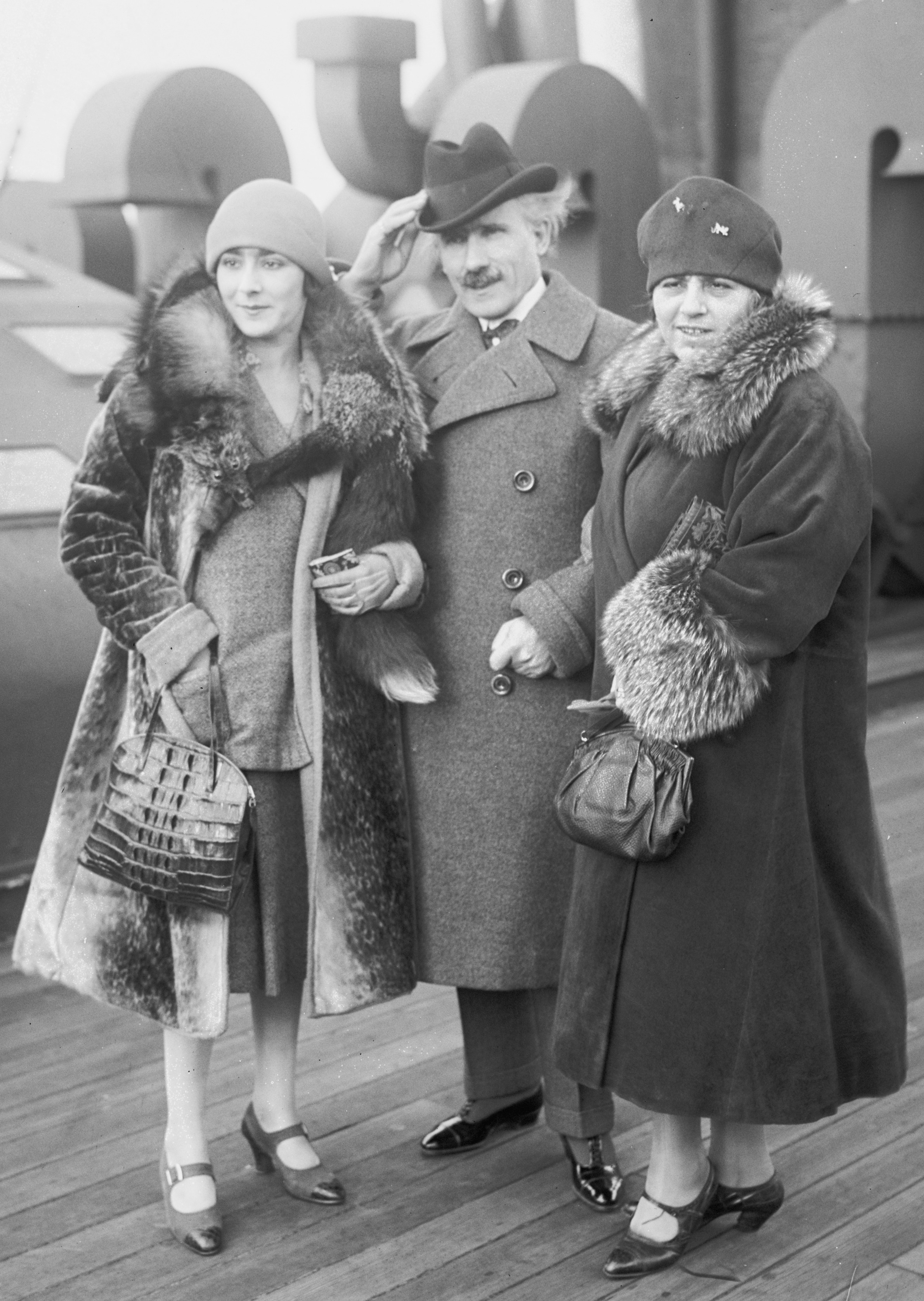
Toscanini with his wife and daughter Wally

Toscanini married Carla De Martini on June 21, 1897, when she was not yet 20 years old. Their first child, Walter, was born on March 19, 1898. A daughter, Wally, was born on January 16, 1900. Carla gave birth to a boy, Giorgio, in September 1901, but he died of diphtheria on June 10, 1906, in Buenos Aires. Then, that same year (1906), Carla gave birth to their second daughter, Wanda.

Toscanini worked with many great singers and musicians throughout his career, but few impressed him as much as pianist Vladimir Horowitz. They worked together a number of times and recorded Brahms' second piano concerto and Tchaikovsky's first piano concerto with the NBC Symphony for RCA Victor. Horowitz also became close to Toscanini and his family. In 1933, Wanda Toscanini married Horowitz, with the conductor's blessings and warnings; they remained married until Vladimir Horowitz' death in 1989. Wanda's daughter Sonia was photographed by Life playing with the conductor.

During World War II, Toscanini lived in Wave Hill, a historic home in Riverdale.

Despite the reported infidelities revealed in Toscanini's letters documented by Harvey Sachs (most famously, with soprano Geraldine Farrar), he remained married to Carla until she died on June 23, 1951, and Toscanini remained widowed.

== Innovations ==
At La Scala, which had what was then the most modern stage lighting system installed in 1901 and an orchestral pit installed in 1907, Toscanini pushed through reforms in the performance of opera. He insisted on dimming the house-lights during performances. As his biographer Harvey Sachs wrote: "He believed that a performance could not be artistically successful unless unity of intention was first established among all the components: singers, orchestra, chorus, staging, sets, and costumes."

Toscanini favored the traditional orchestral seating plan with the first violins and cellos on the left, the violas on the near right, and the second violins on the far right.

== Premieres ==
Toscanini conducted the world premieres of many operas, four of which have become part of the standard operatic repertoire: Pagliacci, La bohème, La fanciulla del West and Turandot. He also took an active role in Alfano's completion of Puccini's Turandot. He conducted the first Italian performances of Siegfried, Götterdämmerung, Salome, Pelléas et Mélisande, and Euryanthe, as well as the South American premieres of Tristan und Isolde and Madama Butterfly and the North American premieres of Boris Godunov and Dmitri Shostakovich's Symphony No. 7. He also conducted the world premiere of Samuel Barber's Adagio for Strings.

=== Operatic premieres ===
- Edmea (revised version) by Alfredo Catalani – Turin, November 4, 1886
- Pagliacci by Ruggero Leoncavallo – Milan, May 21, 1892
- Guglielmo Swarten by Gnaga – Rome, November 15, 1892
- Savitri by Natale Canti – Bologna, December 1, 1894
- Emma Liona by Antonio Lozzi – Venice, May 24, 1895
- La bohème by Giacomo Puccini – Turin, February 1, 1896
- Forza d'Amore by Arturo Buzzi-Peccia – Turin, March 6, 1897
- La Camargo by Enrico De Leva – Turin, March 2, 1898
- Anton by Cesare Galeotii – Milan, December 17, 1900
- Zaza by Leoncavallo – Milan, November 10, 1900
- Le Maschere by Pietro Mascagni – Milan, January 17, 1901
- Mosè by Don Lorenzo Perosi – Milan, November 16, 1901
- Germania by Alberto Franchetti – Milan, March 11, 1902
- Oceana by Antonio Smareglia – Milan, January 22, 1903
- Cassandra by Vittorio Gnecchi – Bologna, December 5, 1905
- Gloria by Francesco Cilea – Milan, April 15, 1907
- La fanciulla del West by Puccini – New York, December 10, 1910
- Madame Sans-Gène by Umberto Giordano – New York, January 25, 1915
- Debora e Jaele by Ildebrando Pizzetti – Milan, December 16, 1922
- Nerone by Arrigo Boito (completed by Toscanini and Vincenzo Tommasini) – Milan, May 1, 1924
- La Cena delle Beffe by Giordano – Milan, December 20, 1924
- I Cavalieri di Ekebu by Riccardo Zandonai – Milan, March 7, 1925
- Turandot by Puccini – Milan, April 25, 1926 (Note: Toscanini informed the audience that the opera was incomplete due to Puccini's death.)
- Fra Gherado by Pizzetti – Milan, May 16, 1928
- Il re by Giordano – Milan, January 12, 1929

=== Orchestral premieres ===
- Adagio for Strings and First Essay for Orchestra by Samuel Barber – NBC Symphony Orchestra, New York, November 5, 1938
- Overture to Aida by Giuseppe Verdi with the NBC Symphony Orchestra, New York on 30 March, 1940.
- Western Suite by Elie Siegmeister – NBC Symphony Orchestra, New York, November 1945.

== Recorded legacy ==
=== Overview ===
Arturo Toscanini made his first recordings in December 1920 with the La Scala Orchestra in the Trinity Church studio of the Victor Talking Machine Company in Camden, New Jersey, and his last with the NBC Symphony Orchestra in June 1954 in Carnegie Hall. His entire catalog of commercial recordings was issued by RCA Victor, save for two recordings for Brunswick in 1926 (his first by the electrical process) with the New York Philharmonic and a series of recordings with the BBC Symphony Orchestra from 1937 to 1939 for EMI's His Master's Voice label (issued in the US by RCA Victor, EMI's American affiliate). Toscanini also conducted the New York Philharmonic in Carnegie Hall for RCA Victor in several recordings in 1929 and 1936. In 1941-42, a series of recordings with Toscanini conducting the Philadelphia Orchestra were made for RCA Victor in the Philadelphia Academy of Music which were initially unissued due to technical problems. All of Toscanini's commercially issued RCA Victor and EMI recordings have been digitally remastered and released on compact disc. There are also recorded concerts with various European orchestras, especially with La Scala Orchestra and the Philharmonia Orchestra. In 2012, RCA Red Seal released a new 84 CD boxed set reissue of Toscanini's complete RCA Victor recordings and commercially issued EMI recordings with the BBC Symphony Orchestra. In 2013, EMI Classics issued a 6-CD set containing Toscanini's complete EMI recordings with the BBC Symphony. Toscanini's dislike of recording was well-known; he especially despised the acoustic method, and for several years he recorded only sporadically as a result. Toscanini was fifty-three years old and had been a conductor for thirty-four years when he made his first recordings in 1920; it wasn't until 1938 that he began recording on a regular basis, after he became conductor of the NBC Symphony Orchestra at the age of seventy. Over the years, as the recording process improved, so did Toscanini's disdain for making records and eventually he became more interested in preserving his performances for posterity. The majority of Toscanini's recordings were made with the NBC Symphony and cover the bulk of his repertoire; these recordings document the final phase of his 68-year conducting career.

=== Specialties ===
Toscanini was especially famous for his performances of Beethoven, Brahms, Wagner, Richard Strauss, Debussy and his own compatriots Rossini, Verdi, Boito and Puccini. He made many recordings, especially towards the end of his career, most of which are still in print. In addition, there are many recordings available of his broadcast performances, as well as his rehearsals with the NBC Symphony.

=== Charles O'Connell on Toscanini ===
Charles O'Connell, who produced many of Toscanini's early NBC Symphony recordings, stated that RCA Victor decided to record the orchestra in Carnegie Hall whenever possible, after numerous customer complaints about the flat and dull-sounding early recordings made in Studio 8-H in 1938 and 1939. Nevertheless, some recording sessions continued to be held in Studio 8-H as late as June 1950, probably because of alterations to the studio beginning in 1939, including installation of an acoustical shell in 1941 at the insistence of Leopold Stokowski before he temporarily replaced Toscanini as principal conductor of the NBC Symphony in the fall of 1941. O'Connell and others often complained the Maestro was little interested in the details of recorded sound and, as Harvey Sachs wrote, Toscanini was frequently disappointed that the microphones failed to pick up everything he heard as he led the orchestra. O'Connell even complained of Toscanini's failure to cooperate with him during the sessions. Toscanini himself was often disappointed that the 78-rpm discs failed to fully capture all of the instruments in the orchestra or altered their sound to such an extent they became unrecognizable. Those who attended Toscanini's concerts later said the NBC string section was especially outstanding.

=== The Philadelphia Orchestra recordings ===
O'Connell also extensively documented RCA's technical problems with the series of recordings by Toscanini and the Philadelphia Orchestra, made in 1941–42, which required extensive electronic editing before they could be issued (well after Toscanini's death, beginning in 1963, with the rest following in 1977). Harvey Sachs also recounts that the wax masters were damaged during processing, possibly because of the use of somewhat-inferior materials imposed by wartime restrictions. Toscanini had listened to several of the test pressings and had given his approval to some of the recordings, rejected others and was prepared to re-record the unsatisfactory sides; unfortunately, the 1942-44 Petrillo/AFM recording ban had begun and prevented immediate retakes; by the end of the ban over two years later, the Philadelphia Orchestra's contract with RCA Victor had expired and the orchestra had signed with Columbia Records. RCA Victor apparently was now hesitant to promote the orchestra and recordings since it was now under contract to arch-rival Columbia and declared the defective Philadelphia masters unsalvageable. When told that RCA had finally decided to scrap the Philadelphia recordings, Toscanini vehemently exclaimed, "I worked like a dog!". The conductor eventually recorded all of the same music with the NBC Symphony. Sonically, the Schubert Symphony in C-Major ("The Great") is considered the best of the Philadelphia recordings and was successfully restored and issued by RCA Victor in 1963. After the Philadelphia Orchestra returned to RCA in 1968, the company was now more favorable toward issuing all of the discs. In 1977, RCA finally released a complete edition of the Toscanini/Philadelphia recordings and it was suggested by Sachs and others that some of the masters may have deteriorated further by that date. As for the historic nature of the recordings, even on the first RCA Victor compact disc issue, released in 1991, some of the sides have considerable surface noise and some distortion, especially during the louder passages. Nevertheless, despite the occasional problems, the sound has been markedly improved on CD, and the entire set is an impressive document of Toscanini's collaboration with the Philadelphia musicians. A second RCA CD reissue of the Philadelphia recordings from 2006 makes even more effective use of digital editing and processing in an attempt to produce improved sound. Longtime Philadelphia conductor Eugene Ormandy expressed his admiration for what Toscanini achieved with the orchestra.

=== High fidelity and stereo ===
When magnetic tape replaced direct wax disc recording and high fidelity long-playing records were both introduced in the late 1940s, Toscanini said he was much happier making recordings. Sachs wrote that an Italian journalist, Raffaele Calzini, said Toscanini told him, "My son Walter sent me the test pressing of the [Beethoven] Ninth from America; I want to hear and check how it came out, and possibly to correct it. These long-playing records often make me happy."

NBC recorded all of Toscanini's broadcast performances on 16-inch 33 1/3 rpm transcription discs from the start of the Maestro's broadcasts in December 1937, but the infrequent use of higher-fidelity sound film for recording sessions began as early as 1933 with the philharmonic, and by December 1948, improved high fidelity made its appearance when RCA began using magnetic tape on a regular basis. High fidelity quickly became the norm for the company and the industry. NBC Radio followed, adopting the new technology in the fall of 1949 for its NBC Symphony broadcasts, among others. The first Toscanini recording sessions in Carnegie Hall followed immediately thereafter, although individual takes continued as with 78s, each running only about 4 1/2 minutes. RCA continued in this vein with 7-inch tape reels until 1953, when long takes on 10-inch reels were finally implemented for the recording of Beethoven's Missa Solemnis. With RCA's experiments in stereo beginning in early 1953 when two-track decks were first delivered by the engineers to the record producers (per Jack Pfeiffer, 11/77 interview, NYC, by CWR), stereo tapes were eventually made of Toscanini's final two broadcast concerts, plus the dress rehearsal for the final broadcast, as documented by Samuel Antek in This Was Toscanini and by Pfeiffer. These followed test sessions in New York's Manhattan Center in December of Delibes with members of the Boston Symphony under Pierre Monteux, in February 1954 with the full Boston Symphony under Charles Munch in Berlioz' Damnation of Faust, and in early March with the NBC Symphony in Manhattan Center again under Stokowski doing the Beethoven Pastoral symphony. For Toscanini, later in March and in early April, the microphones were placed relatively close to the orchestra with limited separation, so the stereo effects were not as dramatic as the commercial "Living Stereo" recordings RCA Victor began to make in March with the Chicago Symphony, just a few weeks earlier. Two days after the final concert, Guido Cantelli took the podium in a hastily organized session to record the Franck Symphony in D minor, for RCA Victor using the same microphone and equipment set-up put in place for the Maestro. The stereo version of the recording was finally released on LP by RCA in 1978 (Warner Music Group now holds the rights and has issued several CD versions). Toscanini's June sessions were recorded monophonically to correct unsatisfactory portions of the broadcast recordings of Aida and Un Ballo in Maschera.

One more example of Toscanini and the NBC Symphony in stereo now also exists in a commercially available edition. This one is of the January 27, 1951, concert devoted to the Verdi Requiem, previously recorded and released in high-fidelity monophonic sound by RCA Victor. Recently a separate NBC tape of the same performance, using a different microphone in a different location, was acquired by Pristine Audio. Using modern digital technology the company constructed a stereophonic version of the performance from the two recordings which it made available in 2009. The company calls this an example of "accidental stereo".

=== Notable recordings ===
External audio
- 1952 performance featuring Arturo Toscanini (conductor) of Johannes Brahms Symphony No. 4 in E Minor Opus 98 with the Philharmonia Orchestra on archive.org

Among his most critically acclaimed recordings, many of which were not officially released during his lifetime, are the following (with the NBC Symphony unless otherwise shown):

- Beethoven, Symphony No. 3 "Eroica" (1953; also 1939 and 1949 recordings)
- Beethoven, Symphony No. 6 "Pastoral" (1952)
- Beethoven, Symphony No. 7 (1936, Philharmonic-Symphony of New York)
- Beethoven, Symphony No. 9 (1952 and 1938) (only the 1952 recording was released officially)
- Beethoven, Missa Solemnis, (1953 and 1940 NBC broadcast) (Only the 1953 version was released officially.)
- Berlioz, Roméo et Juliette (1947 NBC broadcast) (only excerpts released during Toscanini's lifetime)
- Brahms, Symphony No. 1 (1941)
- Brahms, Symphony No. 2 (1952 and February 1948 broadcast)
- Brahms, Symphony No. 3 (February 1948 broadcast) (October 1952 concert, Philharmonia Orchestra)
- Brahms, Symphony No. 4 (1951 and 1948 broadcast)
- Brahms, Four Symphonies, Tragic Overture and Haydn Variations, 1952, Philharmonia Orchestra, London (his only appearances with that orchestra, produced by Walter Legge).
- Debussy, La mer (1950 and 1940 broadcast; only the 1950 version was released officially)
- Dvořák, Symphony No. 9 "From the New World" (1953)
- Mendelssohn, Incidental Music from A Midsummer Night's Dream, (NBC 1947, studio and broadcast versions; Philadelphia 1941); Scherzo, New York Philharmonic, (1929)
- Mendelssohn, Symphony No. 4 "Italian", (1954, exists in two versions: one as approved by Toscanini with excerpts from the rehearsals, and the unedited broadcast)
- Mendelssohn, Symphony No. 5 "Reformation", (1942 broadcast, 1953 studio recording. The 1953 version is the one officially released.)
- Puccini, La bohème (1946 broadcast)
- Mozart, Die Zauberflöte (1937, Salzburg Festival; poor sound)
- Mussorgsky, Pictures at an Exhibition (1938, 1948 and 1953 broadcast, studio recording 1953, all of them in the version orchestrated by Maurice Ravel. The studio recording from January 1953 is the only one to have been officially released.)
- Schubert, Symphony No. 9 (Philadelphia, 1941; NBC 1947 and 1953)
- Tchaikovsky, Piano concerto No. 1 in B flat minor, Op. 23, Vladimir Horowitz and NBC Symphony, (live recording of April 25, 1943 War Bonds benefit concert at Carnegie Hall, first issued in 1959 on LP by RCA Victor)
- Verdi, Requiem (1940 NBC broadcast; and 1951 studio recording)
- Verdi, Un ballo in maschera (1954 NBC broadcast)
- Verdi, Falstaff (1937, Salzburg Festival with restored sound on the Treasury of Immortal Performances label (Andante version out of print); 1950 NBC broadcast)
- Verdi, Rigoletto (Act III only, 1944; from World War II Red Cross benefit concert held in Madison Square Garden, with the combined forces of the New York Philharmonic and the NBC Symphony; the entire concert, complete with an auctioning of one of Toscanini's batons, was released on an unofficial recording in 1995)
- Verdi, Otello (1947 NBC broadcast)
- Wagner, Die Meistersinger von Nürnberg (1937, Salzburg Festival; original Selenophone sound-on-film recording restored on Treasury of Immortal Performances label (Andante version out of print).)

=== Rarities ===
There are many pieces which Toscanini never recorded in the studio; among these are:

- Meyerbeer Overture to Dinorah (1938, on Testament)
- Stravinsky, Suite from Petrushka (ballet) (1940, on RCA Victor)
- Mendelssohn, Symphony No. 3 "Scottish" (1941, on Testament)
- Franz Schubert, Symphony No. 2 (1940, on Testament)
- Dmitri Shostakovich, Symphony No. 7 "Leningrad" (1942, on RCA Victor)
- Vasily Kalinnikov, Symphony No. 1 (1943, on Testament)
- Schumann, Symphony No. 2 (1946, on Testament)
- Boito, scenes from Mefistofele and Nerone, La Scala, Milan, 1948 – Boito Memorial Concert.
- Mussorgsky, Prelude to Khovanshchina (1953)

=== Rehearsals and broadcasts ===
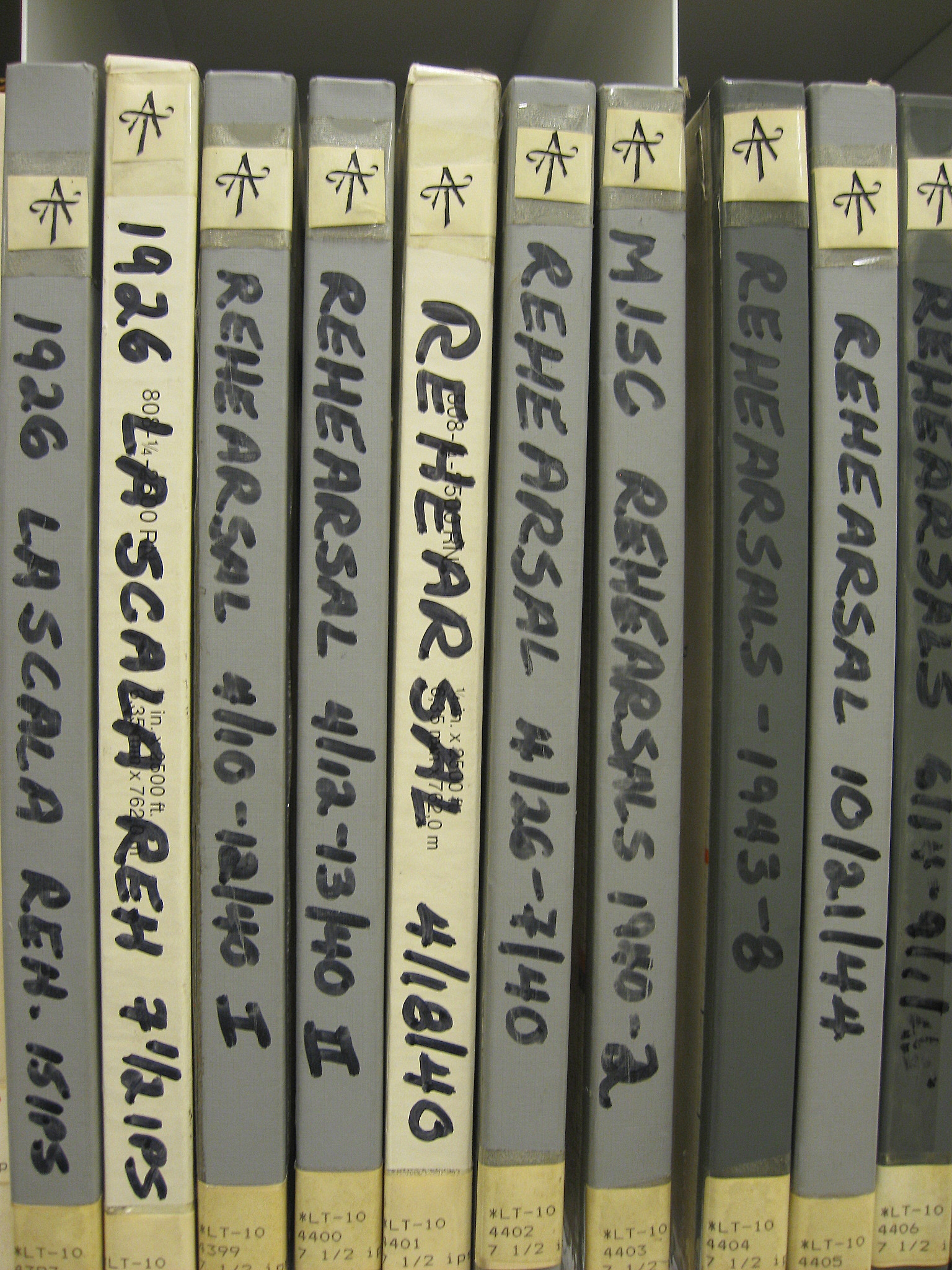
A few of the hundreds of hours of rehearsal tapes featuring Toscanini, residing in the Rodgers and Hammerstein Archive of Recorded Sound, a division of the New York Public Library for the Performing Arts

Many hundreds of hours of Toscanini's rehearsals were recorded. Some of these have circulated in limited edition recordings. Many broadcast recordings with orchestras other than the NBC have also survived, including: The New York Philharmonic from 1933 to 1936, 1942, and 1945; The BBC Symphony Orchestra from 1935 to 1939; The Lucerne Festival Orchestra; and broadcasts from the Salzburg Festival in the late 1930s. Documents of Toscanini's guest appearances with the La Scala Orchestra from 1946 until 1952 include a live recording of Verdi's Requiem with the young Renata Tebaldi. Toscanini's ten NBC Symphony telecasts from 1948 until 1952 were preserved in kinescope films of the live broadcasts. These films, issued by RCA on VHS tape and LaserDisc and on DVD by Testament, provide unique video documentation of the passionate yet restrained podium technique for which he was well known.

=== Recording guide ===
A guide to Toscanini's recording career can be found in Mortimer H. Frank's "From the Pit to the Podium: Toscanini in America" in International Classical Record Collector (1998, 15 8–21) and Christopher Dyment's "Toscanini's European Inheritance" in International Classical Record Collector (1998, 15 22–8). Frank and Dyment also discuss Toscanini's performance history in the 50th anniversary issue of Classic Record Collector (2006, 47) Frank with 'Toscanini – Myth and Reality' (10–14) and Dyment 'A Whirlwind in London' (15–21) This issue also contains interviews with people who performed with Toscanini – Jon Tolansky 'Licia Albanese – Maestro and Me' (22–6) and 'A Mesmerising Beat: John Tolansky talks to some of those who worked with Arturo Toscanini, to discover some of the secrets of his hold over singers, orchestras and audiences.' (34–7). There is also a feature article on Toscanini's interpretation of Brahms's First Symphony – Norman C. Nelson, 'First Among Equals ... Toscanini's interpretation of Brahms's First Symphony in the context of others' (28–33)

=== Arturo Toscanini Society ===
In 1969, Clyde J. Key acted on a dream he had of meeting Toscanini by starting the Arturo Toscanini Society to release a number of "unapproved" live performances by Toscanini. As the magazine Time reported, Key scoured the U.S. and Europe for off-the-air transcriptions of Toscanini broadcasts, acquiring almost 5,000 transcriptions (all transferred to tape) of previously unreleased material—a complete catalogue of broadcasts by the Maestro between 1933 and 1954. It included about 50 concerts that were never broadcast, but which were recorded surreptitiously by engineers supposedly testing their equipment.

A private, nonprofit club based in Dumas, Texas, it offered members five or six LPs annually for a $25-a-year membership fee. Key's first package offering included Brahms' German Requiem, Haydn's Symphonies Nos. 88 and 104, and Richard Strauss' Ein Heldenleben, all NBC Symphony broadcasts dating from the late 1930s or early 1940s. In 1970, the society releases included Sibelius' Symphony No. 4, Mendelssohn's "Scottish" Symphony, dating from the same NBC period; and a Rossini-Verdi-Puccini LP emanating from the post-War reopening of La Scala on May 11, 1946, with the Maestro conducting. That same year it released a Beethoven bicentennial set that included the 1935 Missa Solemnis with the philharmonic and LPs of the 1948 televised concert of the ninth symphony taken from an FM radio transcription, complete with Ben Grauer's comments. (In the early 1990s, the kinescopes of these and the other televised concerts were released by RCA with soundtracks dubbed in from the NBC radio transcriptions; in 2006, they were re-released by Testament on DVD.)

Additional releases included a number of Beethoven symphonies recorded with the New York Philharmonic during the 1930s, a performance of Mozart's Piano Concerto No. 27 on February 20, 1936, at which Rudolf Serkin made his New York debut, and a 1940 broadcast version of Beethoven's Missa Solemnis.

Because the Arturo Toscanini Society was nonprofit, Key said he believed he had successfully bypassed both copyright restrictions and the maze of contractual ties between RCA and the Maestro's family. RCA's attorneys were soon looking into the matter to see if they agreed. As long as it stayed small, the society appeared to offer little real competition to RCA. But classical-LP profits were low enough even in 1970, and piracy by fly-by-night firms so prevalent within the industry at that time (an estimated $100 million in tape sales for 1969 alone), that even a benevolent buccaneer outfit like the Arturo Toscanini Society had to be looked at twice before it could be tolerated.

Magazine and newspaper reports subsequently detailed legal action taken against Key and the society, presumably after some of the LPs began to appear in retail stores. Toscanini fans and record collectors were dismayed because, although Toscanini had not approved the release of these performances in every case, many of them were found to be further proof of the greatness of the Maestro's musical talents. One outstanding example of a remarkable performance not approved by the Maestro was his December 1948 NBC broadcast of Dvořák's Symphonic Variations, released on an LP by the society. (A kinescope of the same performance, from the television simulcast, has been released on VHS and LaserDisc by RCA/BMG and on DVD by Testament.) There was speculation that the Toscanini family itself, prodded by his daughter Wanda, had sought to defend the Maestro's original decisions (made mostly during his last years) on what should be released. Walter Toscanini later admitted that his father likely rejected performances that were satisfactory. Whatever the real reasons, the Arturo Toscanini Society was forced to disband and cease releasing any further recordings.

== Television ==
Arturo Toscanini was one of the first conductors to make extended appearances on live television. Between 1948 and 1952, he conducted ten concerts telecast on NBC, including a two-part concert performance of Verdi's complete opera Aida starring Herva Nelli and Richard Tucker, and the first complete telecast of Beethoven's Ninth Symphony. All of these were simulcast on radio. These concerts were all shown only once during that four-year span, but they were preserved on kinescopes.

The telecasts began on March 20, 1948, with an all-Wagner program, including the Prelude to Act III of Lohengrin; the overture and bacchanale from Tannhäuser; "Forest Murmurs" from Siegfried; "Dawn and Siegfried's Rhine Journey" from Götterdämmerung; and "The Ride of the Valkyries" from Die Walküre. On the very same day that this concert was telecast live, conductor Eugene Ormandy also made his live television concert debut with the Philadelphia Orchestra. They performed Weber's overture to Der Freischutz and Rachmaninoff's Symphony no. 1, which had been recently rediscovered. The Ormandy concert was telecast by rival network CBS, but the schedules were arranged so that the two programs would not interfere with one another.

Less than a month after the first Toscanini televised concert, a complete performance by the conductor of Beethoven's Ninth Symphony was telecast on April 3, 1948. On November 13, 1948, there was an all-Brahms program, including the Concerto for Violin, Cello, and Orchestra in A minor (Mischa Mischakoff, violin; Frank Miller, cello); Liebeslieder-Walzer, Op. 52 (with two pianists and a small chorus); and Hungarian Dance No. 1 in G minor. On December 3, 1948, Toscanini conducted Mozart's Symphony No. 40 in G minor; Dvořák's Symphonic Variations; and Wagner's original overture to Tannhäuser.

There were two Toscanini telecasts in 1949, both devoted to the concert performance of Verdi's Aida from studio 8H. Acts I and II were telecast on March 26 and III and IV on April 2. Portions of the audio were rerecorded in June 1954 for the commercial release on LP records. As the video shows, the soloists were placed close to Toscanini, in front of the orchestra, while the robed members of the Robert Shaw Chorale were on risers behind the orchestra.

There were no Toscanini telecasts in 1950, but they resumed from Carnegie Hall on November 3, 1951, with Weber's overture to Euryanthe and Brahms' Symphony No. 1. On December 29, 1951, there was another all-Wagner program that included the two excerpts from Siegfried and Die Walküre featured on the March 1948 telecast, plus the Prelude to Act II of Lohengrin; the Prelude and Liebestod from Tristan und Isolde; and "Siegfried's Death and Funeral Music" from Götterdämmerung.

On March 15, 1952, Toscanini conducted the Symphonic Interlude from Franck's Rédemption; Sibelius's En saga; Debussy's "Nuages" and "Fêtes" from Nocturnes; and the overture of Rossini's William Tell. The final live Toscanini telecast, on March 22, 1952, included Beethoven's Symphony No. 5, and Respighi's Pines of Rome.

The NBC cameras were often left on Toscanini for extended periods, documenting not only his baton techniques but his deep involvement in the music. At the end of a piece, Toscanini generally nodded rather than bowed and exited the stage quickly. Although NBC continued to broadcast the orchestra on radio until April 1954, telecasts were abandoned after March 1952.

As part of a restoration project initiated by the Toscanini family in the late 1980s, the kinescopes were fully restored and issued by RCA on VHS and LaserDisc beginning in 1989. The audio portion of the sound was taken, not from the noisy kinescopes, but from 33-1/3 rpm 16-inch transcription disc and high fidelity audio tape recordings made simultaneously by RCA technicians during the televised concerts. The hi-fi audio was synchronized with the kinescope video for the home video release. Original introductions by NBC's longtime announcer Ben Grauer were replaced with new commentary by Martin Bookspan. The entire group of Toscanini videos has since been reissued by Testament on DVD, with further improvements to the sound.

== Film ==
In December of 1943, Toscanini appeared in a 31-minute film produced by the United States Office of War Information titled Hymn of the Nations, directed by Alexander Hammid. Mostly filmed in NBC's Studio 8-H, the film, narrated by Burgess Meredith, consists of Toscanini conducting the NBC Symphony Orchestra in a performance of Verdi's overture to La forza del destino and Inno delle nazioni (Hymn of the Nations), a cantata which contains the national anthems of England, France, and Italy (the World War I allied nations), to which Toscanini added arrangements of the Soviet "Internationale" and "The Star-Spangled Banner". Tenor Jan Peerce and the Westminster Choir performed in the latter work.

The film was commercially released by RCA/BMG on DVD in 2004. The "Internationale" was cut from the 1943 film after its original release, but the complete recording of Hymn of the Nations including the "Internationale" can be heard on all RCA LP and CD releases of the cantata. Hymn of the Nations was nominated for a 1944 Academy Award for Best Documentary Short.

Toscanini: The Maestro is a 1985 documentary made for cable television. It was originally televised on Bravo, and subsequently on PBS, in 1988. The film features archival footage of the conductor and interviews with musicians who worked with him. This film was released on VHS and in 2004 on the same DVD which included the film, Hymn of the Nations.

Toscanini is the subject of the highly fictionalized screen biography Il giovane Toscanini (Young Toscanini) (1988), starring C. Thomas Howell and Elizabeth Taylor, and directed by Franco Zeffirelli. The film received poor reviews and was never officially released in the United States. The film is a fictional recounting of the events that led up to Toscanini making his conducting debut in Rio de Janeiro in 1886. Although nearly all of the plot is embellished, the events surrounding Toscanini's unexpected conducting debut are based on fact.

John Kavanagh plays Toscanini in a brief scene in the 2016 biographical comedy-drama Florence Foster Jenkins. Toscanini was also portrayed by Barry Jackson in the 2008 dramatized documentary Toscanini: In His Own Words.

== Acclaim and criticism ==
Throughout his career, Toscanini was virtually idolized by the critics, as well as by most fellow musicians and the public alike. He enjoyed the kind of consistent critical acclaim during his life that few other musicians have had. He was featured three times on the cover of Time magazine, in 1926, 1934, and again in 1948. In the magazine's history, he is the only conductor to have been so honored. On March 25, 1989, the United States Postal Service issued a 25 cent postage stamp in his honor. Some online critics such as Peter Gutmann have dismissed much of what was written about Toscanini during his lifetime and for about ten years afterwards as "adoring puffery". Nevertheless, composers and others who worked with Toscanini, including Aaron Copland in an audio interview, readily acknowledged what they felt was his greatness.

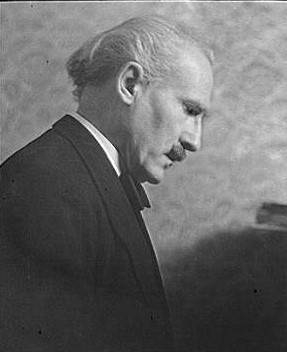
Arturo Toscanini, March 1934

Over the past thirty years or so, as a new generation has appeared, an increasing amount of revisionist criticism has been directed at Toscanini. These critics contend that Toscanini was ultimately a detriment to American music rather than an asset because of the tremendous marketing of him by RCA as the greatest conductor of all time and his preference to perform mostly older European music. According to Harvey Sachs, Mortimer Frank, and B. H. Haggin, this criticism can be traced to the lack of focus on Toscanini as a conductor rather than his legacy. Frank, in his 2002 book Toscanini: The NBC Years, rejects this revisionism quite strongly, and cites the author Joseph Horowitz (author of Understanding Toscanini) as perhaps the most extreme of these critics. Frank writes that this revisionism has unfairly influenced younger listeners and critics, who may have not heard as many of Toscanini's performances as older listeners, and as a result, Toscanini's reputation, extraordinarily high in the years that he was active, has suffered a decline. Conversely, Joseph Horowitz contends that those who keep the Toscanini legend alive are members of a "Toscanini cult", an idea not altogether refuted by Frank, but not embraced by him, either.

Some contemporary critics, particularly Virgil Thomson, also took Toscanini to task for not paying enough attention to the "modern repertoire" (i.e., 20th-century composers, of which Thomson was one). It may be speculated, knowing Toscanini's antipathy toward much 20th-century music, that perhaps Thomson had a feeling that the conductor would never have played any of his (Thomson's) music, and that perhaps because of this, Thomson bore a resentment against him. During Toscanini's middle years, however, such now widely accepted composers as Richard Strauss and Claude Debussy, whose music the conductor held in very high regard, were considered to be radical and modern. He performed works by Zoltán Kodály, and in 1930 Toscanini requested him to compose a symphony which would be premiered in 1961 and dedicated to the memory of Toscanini. He also performed excerpts from Igor Stravinsky's Petrushka and his Feu d'artifice, two of Dmitri Shostakovich's symphonies (Nos. 1 and 7), and three of George Gershwin's most famous works, Rhapsody in Blue, An American in Paris, and the Piano Concerto in F, though his performances of these last three works have been criticized as not being "jazzy" enough.

Another criticism leveled at Toscanini stems from the constricted sound quality that comes from many of his recordings, notably those made in NBC's Studio 8-H. Studio 8-H was foremost a radio and later a television studio, not a true concert hall. Its dry acoustics lacking in much reverberation, while ideal for broadcasting, were unsuited for symphonic concerts and opera. It is widely held that Toscanini favored it because its close miking enabled listeners to hear every instrumental strand in the orchestra clearly, something in which the conductor strongly believed.

Toscanini has also been criticized for metronomic (rhythmically too rigid) performances:

Others attacked the conductor on the ground that he was a slave to the metronome. They said that his beat was inexorable, that his rhythms were rigid, that he was an enemy of Italian song and a wrecker of the art of bel canto.
When he was young as a conductor, it was complained of Toscanini that he held the tempo and rhythm of the music firmly to its course and that it had the mechanical exactitude of a metronome.

— The Maestro: The Life Of Arturo Toscanini (1951) by Howard Taubman

Toscanini has also been noted for his temper in rehearsals. Apparently less controlled later in life, he was known to vent his anger in front of the orchestra when he thought they were not playing well. One well-known example comes from a recording of a rehearsal for La Traviata in which he yells in frustration when the double basses are not quite together.

The song "(If You Can't Sing It) You'll Have to Swing It (Mr. Paganini)" is a satire of Toscanini.

== Legacy ==
In 1939, a school in New York was established in Toscanini's name.

Beginning in 1963, NBC Radio broadcast a weekly series of programs entitled Toscanini: The Man Behind The Legend, commemorating Toscanini's years with the NBC Symphony Orchestra. The show, hosted by NBC announcer Ben Grauer, who had also hosted many of the original Toscanini broadcasts, featured interviews with members of the conductor's family, as well as musicians of the NBC Symphony, David Sarnoff, and noted classical musicians who had worked with the conductor, such as Giovanni Martinelli. It spotlighted partial or complete rebroadcasts of many of Toscanini's recordings. The program ran for at least three years, and did not feature any of the revisionist commentary about the conductor one finds so often today in magazines such as American Record Guide. The series was rebroadcast by PBS radio in the late 1970s.

In 1986, the New York Public Library for the Performing Arts purchased the bulk of Toscanini's papers, scores and sound recordings from his heirs. Named The Toscanini Legacy, this vast collection contains thousands of letters, programs and various documents, over 1,800 scores and more than 400 hours of sound recordings. A finding aid for the scores and sound recordings is available on the library's website. In-house finding aids are available for other parts of the collection. The library also has many other collections that have Toscanini materials in them, such as the Bruno Walter papers, the Fiorello H. La Guardia papers, and a collection of material from Rose Bampton.

In 1994, the Fondazione Arturo Toscanini (Arturo Toscanini Foundation) was created, a musical institution of the Emilia-Romagna Region operating with the support of the Italian Ministry of Cultural Heritage and Activities, and successor and natural evolution of the association established in 1975 by the Municipalities and Provinces of Emilia-Romagna in 1977. The foundation operates two different artistic ensembles: the Filarmonica Arturo Toscanini (Arturo Toscanini Philharmonic Orchestra), performing symphonic repertoire with major international soloists and conductors; and, the orchestra dell’Emilia-Romagna Arturo Toscanini (Arturo Toscanini Orchestra of Emilia-Romagna), which acts both in regional and educational concert activity and in opera productions. As of January 2017, it moved to its new, multifunctional venue: the Centro di Produzione Musicale “Arturo Toscanini” (Arturo Toscanini Music Production Centre), located within the Parco Eridania in Parma, a few metres from the Auditorium Paganini, where concerts are held. An annual conducting competition is run, for new conductors. The Fondazione Arturo Toscanini also promotes the Toscanini Competition for young conductors, which began in 1985, and the twelfth edition of which occurs in 2026 on the 50th anniversary of the founding of the Arturo Toscanini Orchestra.

== The Maestro Revisited ==
In 1967, The Bell Telephone Hour telecast a program entitled Toscanini: The Maestro Revisited, written and narrated by New York Times music critic Harold C. Schonberg, and featuring commentary by conductors Eugene Ormandy, George Szell, Erich Leinsdorf and Milton Katims (who had played viola in the NBC Symphony Orchestra). The program also featured clips from two of Toscanini's television concerts, in the days before they were remastered for video and DVD.

== Quotations ==
- Of German composer Richard Strauss, whose political stance during World War II was controversial: "To Strauss the composer I take off my hat; to Strauss the man I put it back on again."
- "The conduct of my life has been, is, and will always be the echo and reflection of my conscience."
- "Gentlemen, be democrats in life but aristocrats in art."
- Referring to the first movement of the Eroica: "Some say this is Napoleon, some Hitler, some Mussolini. Bah! For me it is simply allegro con brio."
- At the point where Puccini left off writing the finale of his unfinished opera, Turandot: "Here Death triumphed over art" (Toscanini then left the opera pit, the lights went up and the audience left in silence).
- While in California in 1940, Toscanini was invited to visit a movie set at the Metro-Goldwyn-Mayer studios. There he said with tears in his eyes, "I will remember three things in my life: the sunset, the Grand Canyon and Eleanor Powell's dancing."

Cultural offices
Preceded by Franco Faccio	Music Director, La Scala; 1898–1908	Succeeded by Tullio Serafin
Preceded by Tullio Serafin	Music Director, La Scala; 1921–1929	Succeeded by Victor de Sabata
