= Vladimir Horowitz =

Russian and American pianist (1903–1989)

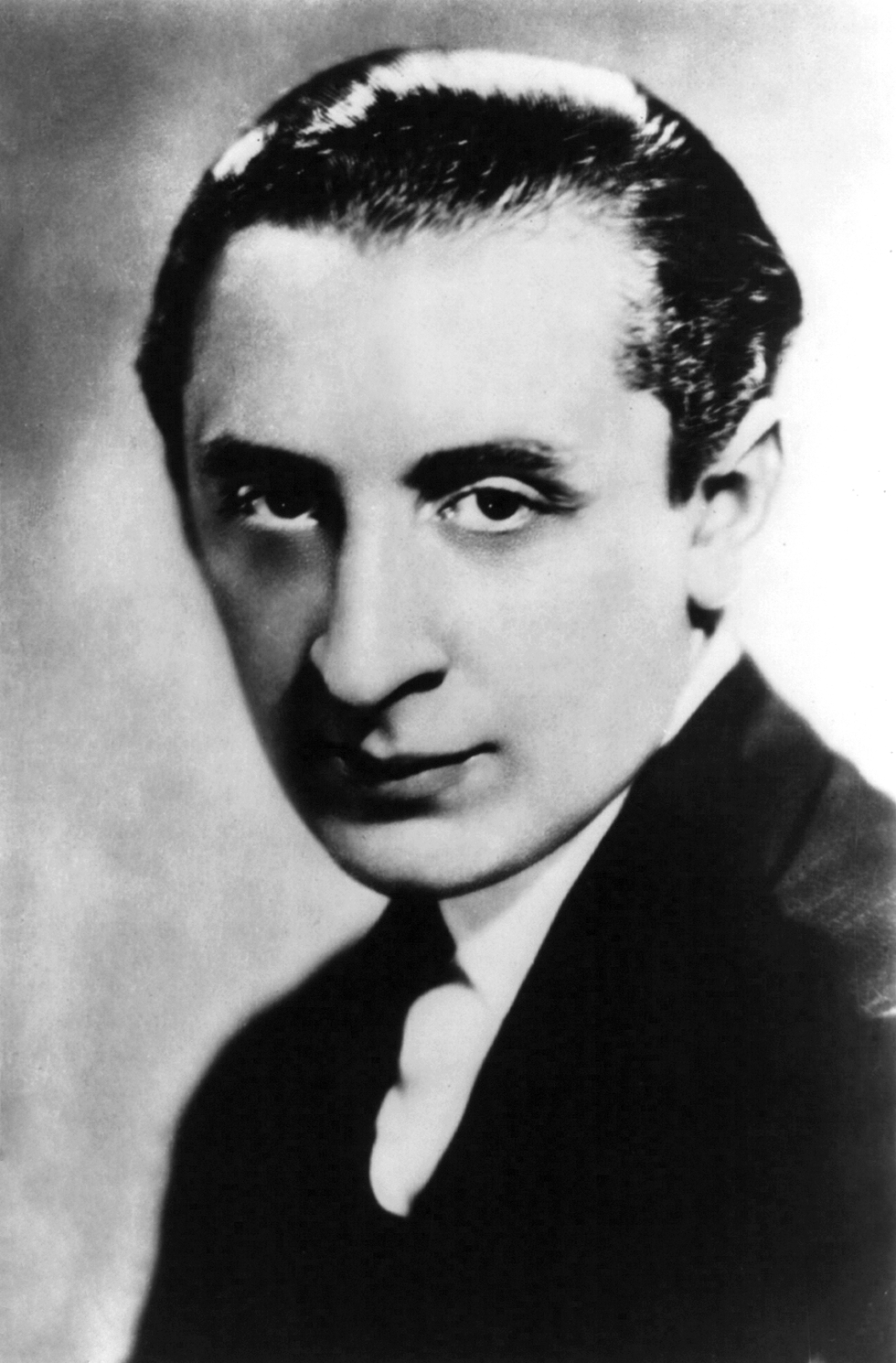
- Born: October 1, 1903; Kiev, Russian Empire
- Died: November 5, 1989 (aged 86); New York City, U.S.
- Resting place: Cimitero Monumentale di Milano
- Education: Kiev Conservatory
- Spouse: Wanda Toscanini (m. 1933)
- Children: 1

Signature
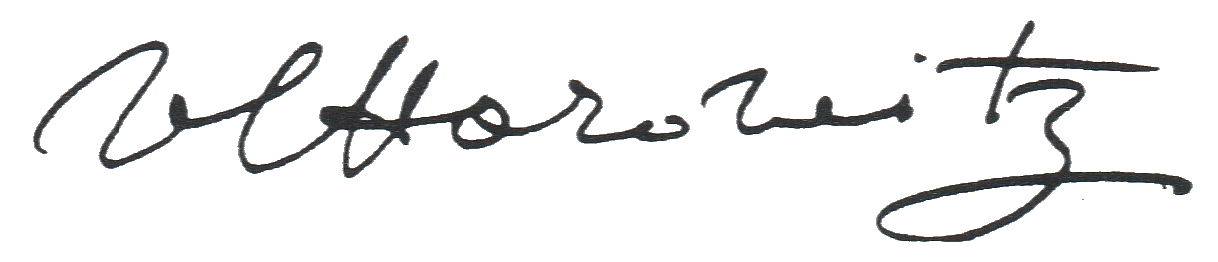

Vladimir Samoylovich Horowitz (Note: /ˈhɒrəvɪts/; Russian: Владимир Самойлович Горовиц, romanized: Vladimir Samoylovich Gorovits; Yiddish: וולאַדימיר סאַמוילאָוויטש האָראָוויץ) (Note: In this name that follows East Slavic naming customs, the patronymic is Samoylovich and the family name is Horowitz.) (October 1 [O.S. September 18], 1903 – November 5, 1989) was a Russian (Note: Attributed to the following sources:) and American pianist. Considered one of the greatest pianists of all time, (Note: Attributed to the following sources:) he was known for his virtuoso technique, timbre, and the public excitement engendered by his playing.

== Life and early career ==
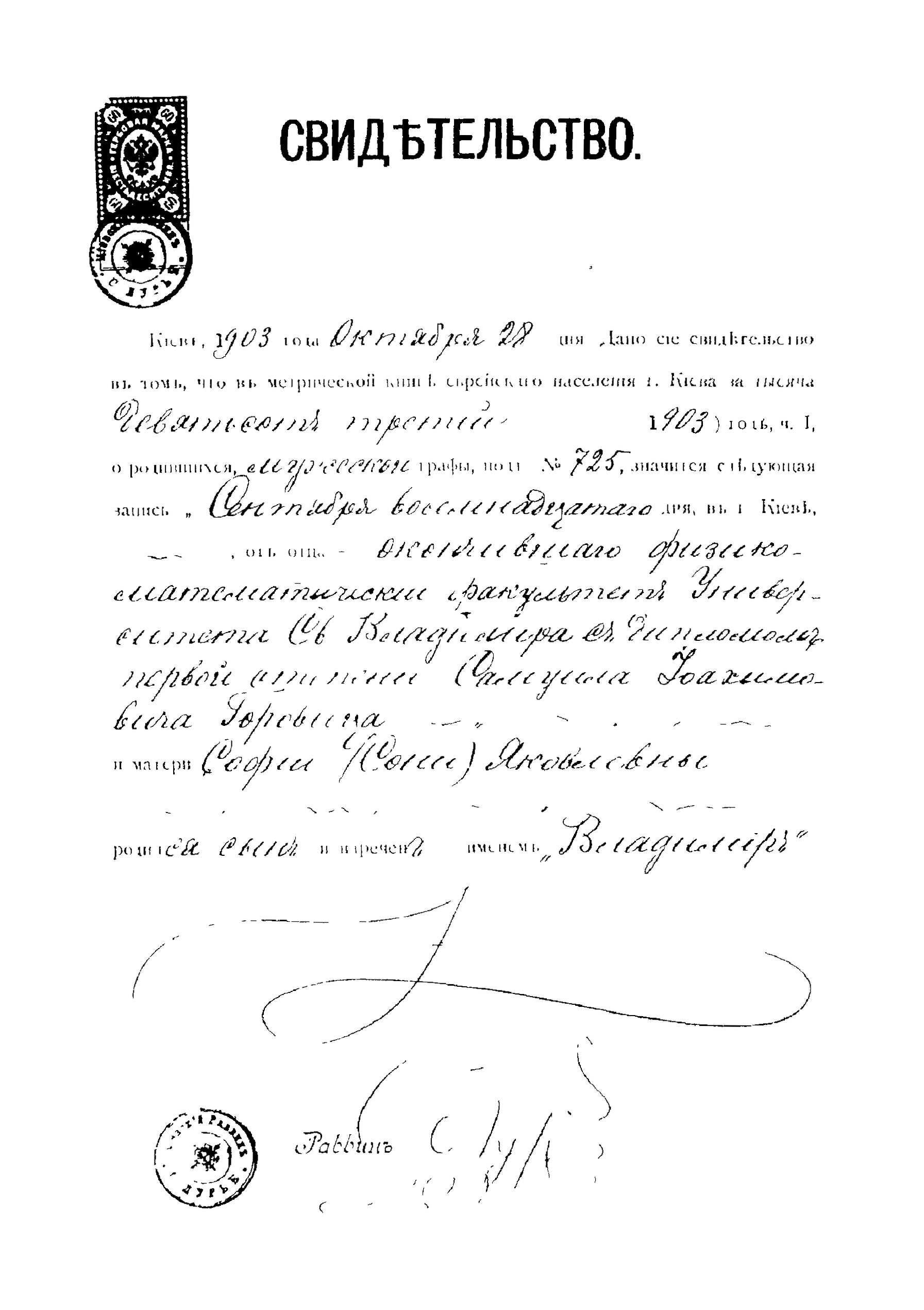
Birth certificate of Vladimir Horowitz

Horowitz was born on October 1, 1903, in Kiev in the Russian Empire (present-day Ukraine). According to Nicolas Slonimsky, Horowitz was born in Berdichev, a city near Zhitomir in the Volhynian Governorate. However, his birth certificate states that Kiev was his birthplace. He was the youngest of four children of Samuil Horowitz and Sophia (née Bodik), who were assimilated Jews.

His uncle Alexander was a pupil and close friend of Alexander Scriabin. When Horowitz was 10, it was arranged for him to play for Scriabin, who told his parents that he was extremely talented.

Horowitz received piano instruction from an early age, initially from his mother, who was herself a pianist. In 1912, he entered the Kiev Conservatory, where he was taught by Vladimir Puchalsky, Sergei Tarnowsky, and Felix Blumenfeld. His first solo recital was in Kiev on May 30, 1920.

Horowitz soon began to tour Russia and the Soviet Union, where he was often paid with bread, butter and chocolate rather than money, due to the economic hardship caused by the Russian Civil War. During the 1922–23 season, he performed 23 concerts of eleven different programs in Petrograd alone. Despite his early success as a pianist, he maintained that he wanted to be a composer and undertook a career as a pianist only to help his family, who had lost their possessions in the Russian Revolution.

In December 1925, Horowitz emigrated to Germany, ostensibly to study with Artur Schnabel in Berlin but secretly intending not to return. He stuffed American dollars and British pound notes into his shoes to finance his initial concerts.

== Career in the West ==
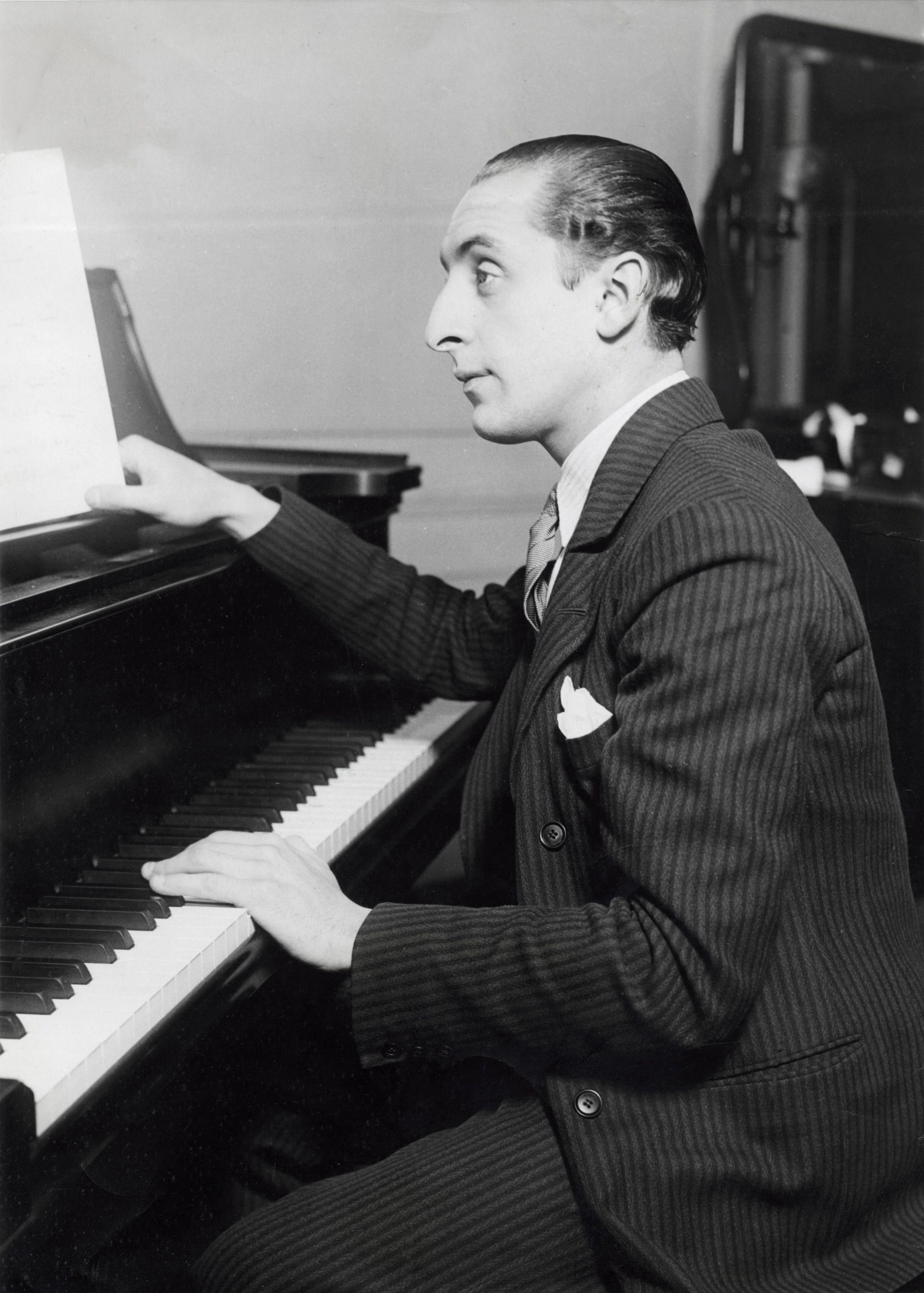
Horowitz in his early career.

On December 18, 1925, Horowitz made his first appearance outside his home country, in Berlin. He later played in Paris, London, and New York City. In 1926, the Soviet Union selected Horowitz to join the delegation of pianists that were to represent the country at the I International Chopin Piano Competition in Poland in 1927, but he decided to remain in the West and did not participate.

Horowitz gave his United States debut on January 12, 1928, in Carnegie Hall. He played Tchaikovsky's Piano Concerto No. 1 under the direction of Sir Thomas Beecham, who was also making his U.S. debut. Horowitz later said that he and Beecham had divergent ideas about tempos and that Beecham was conducting the score "from memory and he didn't know" the piece. Horowitz's rapport with his audience was phenomenal. Olin Downes, writing for The New York Times, was critical about the tug of war between conductor and soloist, but credited Horowitz with both a beautiful singing tone in the second movement and a tremendous technique in the finale, calling his playing a "tornado unleashed from the steppes". In this debut performance, Horowitz demonstrated a marked ability to excite his audience, an ability he maintained for his entire career. Downes wrote: "it has been years since a pianist created such a furor with an audience in this city." In his review of Horowitz's solo recital, Downes characterized the pianist's playing as showing "most if not all the traits of a great interpreter." In 1933, he played for the first time with the conductor Arturo Toscanini in a performance of Beethoven's Piano Concerto No. 5. Horowitz and Toscanini went on to perform together many times, on stage and in recordings. Horowitz settled in the U.S. in 1939 and became an American citizen in 1944. He made his television debut in a concert taped at Carnegie Hall on February 1, 1968, and broadcast nationwide by CBS on September 22 of that year.

Despite rapturous receptions at recitals, Horowitz became increasingly unsure of his abilities as a pianist. On several occasions, the pianist had to be pushed onto the stage. He suffered from depression and withdrew from public performances from 1936 to 1938, 1953 to 1965, 1969 to 1974, and 1983 to 1985.

=== Recordings ===
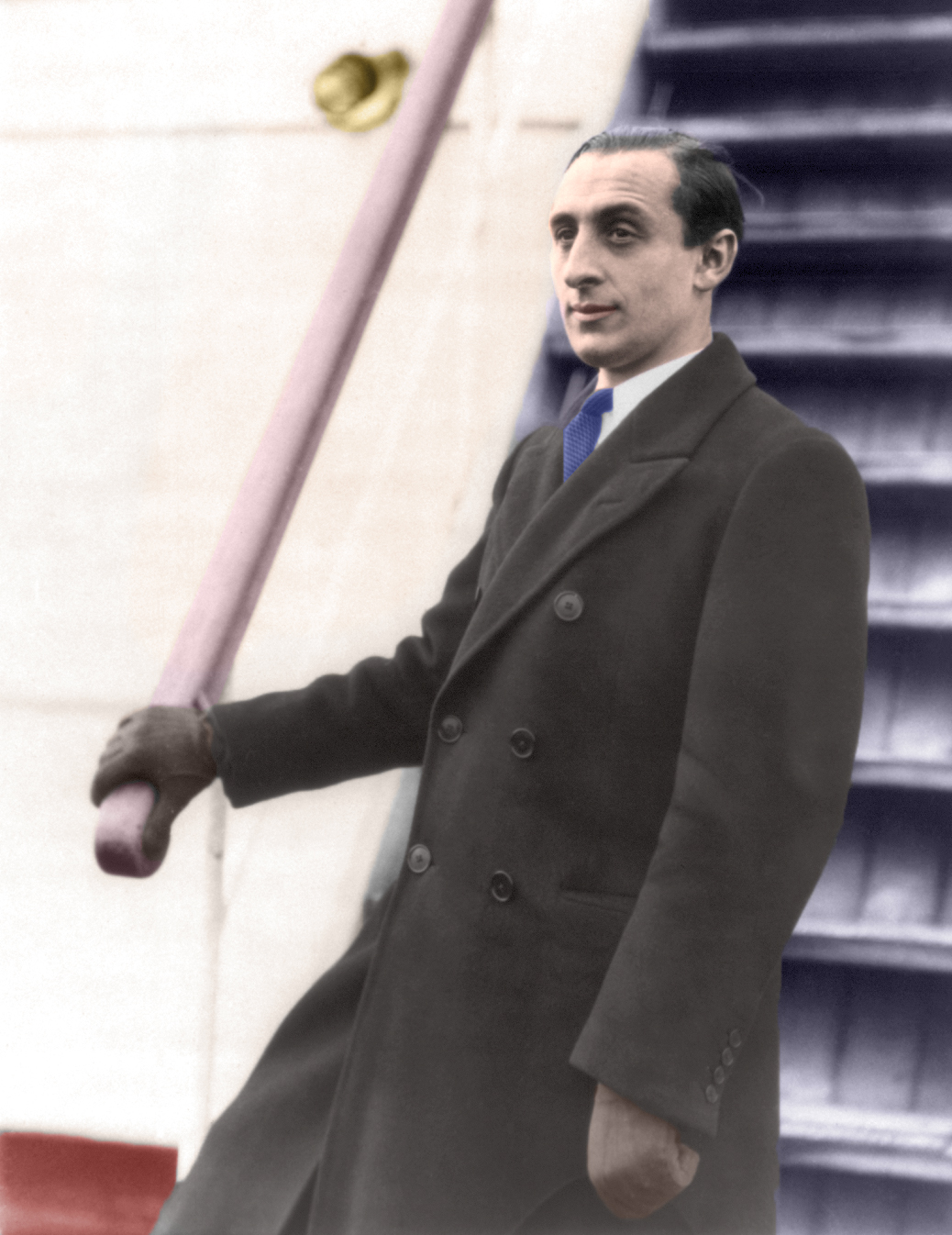
Horowitz in 1931

External audio
- You may hear Vladimir Horowitz performing Johannes Brahms "Piano Concerto No. 2 in B-flat Major" with Arturo Toscanini conducting the NBC Symphony Orchestra in 1940. Link.

In 1926, Horowitz performed on several piano rolls at the Welte-Mignon studios in Freiburg, Germany. His first recordings were made in the United States for the Victor Talking Machine Company in 1928. Horowitz's first European-produced recording, made in 1930 by The Gramophone Company/His Master's Voice RCA Victor's UK based affiliate, was of Rachmaninoff's Piano Concerto No. 3 with Albert Coates and the London Symphony Orchestra, the world premiere recording of that piece. Through 1936, Horowitz continued to make recordings in the UK for HMV of solo piano repertoire, including his 1932 account of Liszt's Sonata in B minor. Beginning in 1940, Horowitz's recording activity was again concentrated for RCA Victor in the US. That year, he recorded Brahms Piano Concerto No. 2, and in 1941, the Tchaikovsky Piano Concerto No. 1, both with Toscanini and the NBC Symphony Orchestra. In 1959, RCA Victor issued a live 1943 performance of the Tchaikovsky concerto with Horowitz and Toscanini; generally considered superior to the 1941 studio recording, it was selected for induction into the Grammy Hall of Fame. During Horowitz's second retirement, which began in 1953, he made a series of recordings for RCA Victor in his New York City townhouse, including LPs of Scriabin and Clementi. Horowitz's first stereo recording, issued by RCA Victor in 1959, was devoted to Beethoven piano sonatas.

In 1962, Horowitz embarked on a series of recordings for Columbia Records. The best known are his 1965 return concert at Carnegie Hall and a 1968 recording from his television special, Vladimir Horowitz: a Concert at Carnegie Hall, televised by CBS. Horowitz continued making studio recordings, including a 1969 recording of Schumann's Kreisleriana, which was awarded the Prix Mondial du Disque. In 1975, Horowitz returned to RCA and made live recordings for the company until 1983. He signed with Deutsche Grammophon in 1985, and made studio and live recordings until 1989, including his only recording of Mozart's Piano Concerto No. 23. Four documentary films featuring Horowitz were made during this period, including the telecast of his April 20, 1986, Moscow recital. His final recording, for Sony Classical (formerly Columbia), was completed four days before his death and consisted of repertoire he had never previously recorded.

All of Horowitz's recordings have been issued on compact disc, some several times. In the years following Horowitz's death, CDs were issued containing previously unreleased performances. These included selections from Carnegie Hall recitals recorded privately for Horowitz from 1945 to 1951.

=== Students ===
Horowitz taught seven students between 1937 and 1965: Nico Kaufmann (1937), Byron Janis (1944–1948), Gary Graffman (1953–1955), Coleman Blumfield (1956–1958), Ronald Turini (1956–1965), Alexander Fiorillo (1960–1962) and Ivan Davis (1961–1962). Janis described his relationship to Horowitz during that period as a surrogate son, and he often traveled with Horowitz and his wife during concert tours. Davis was invited to become one of Horowitz's students after receiving a call from him the day after he won the Franz Liszt Competition. At the time, Davis had a contract with Columbia Records and a national tour planned. According to biographer Glenn Plaskin, Horowitz claimed that he had only taught three students during that period, saying, "Many young people say they have been pupils of Horowitz, but there were only three: Janis, Turini, who I brought to the stage, and Graffman. If someone else claims it, it's not true. I had some who played for me for four months. Once a week. I stopped work with them because they did not progress." Plaskin remarks: "The fact that Horowitz disavowed most of his students and blurred the facts regarding their periods of study says something about the erratic nature of his personality during that period." Horowitz returned to coaching in the 1980s, working with Murray Perahia, who already had an established career, and Eduardus Halim.

== Personal life ==
In 1933, in a civil ceremony, Horowitz married Wanda Toscanini, Arturo Toscanini's daughter. Although Horowitz was Jewish and Wanda was Catholic, this was not an issue, because neither of them was religiously observant. Because Wanda knew no Russian and Horowitz knew very little Italian, their primary language was French.

Horowitz was close to his wife, who was one of the few people from whom Horowitz would accept a critique of his playing, and she stayed with Horowitz when he refused to leave the house during a period of depression. They had one child, Sonia Toscanini Horowitz (1934–1975). She was critically injured in a motorbike accident in 1957 but survived. She died in 1975. It has not been determined whether her death in Geneva, from a drug overdose, was accidental or a suicide.

Despite his marriage, there were persistent rumors of Horowitz's homosexuality. Arthur Rubinstein said of Horowitz that "[e]veryone knew and accepted him as a homosexual." David Dubal wrote that in his years with Horowitz, there was no evidence that the octogenarian was sexually active, but that "there was no doubt he was powerfully attracted to the male body and was most likely often sexually frustrated throughout his life." Dubal felt that Horowitz sublimated a strong instinctual sexuality into a powerful erotic undercurrent communicated in his playing. Horowitz, who denied being homosexual, was said to have joked that "there are three kinds of pianists: Jewish pianists, homosexual pianists, and bad pianists!"

In an article in The New York Times in September 2013, Kenneth Leedom, an assistant of Horowitz for five years before 1955, said he had secretly been Horowitz's lover:

We had a wonderful life together... He was a difficult man, to say the least. He had an anger in him that was unbelievable. The number of meals I've had thrown on the floor or in my lap. He'd pick up the tablecloth and just pull it off the table, and all the food would go flying. He had tantrums, a lot. But then he was calm and sweet. Very sweet, very lovable. And he really adored me.

In the 1940s, Horowitz began seeing a psychiatrist in an attempt to alter his sexual orientation. In the 1960s, and again in the 1970s, the pianist underwent electroshock treatment for depression.

In 1982, Horowitz began using prescribed antidepressant medications; there are reports that he was drinking as well. His playing underwent a perceptible decline during this period, with his 1983 performances in the United States and Japan marred by memory lapses and a loss of physical control. Hidekazu Yoshida, Japanese critic, likened Horowitz to a "cracked rare, gorgeous antique vase." He stopped playing in public for two years.

== Last years ==
Not long before Horowitz died, he called [his manager] Peter Gelb and told him he was like family now and he didn't have to call him "Mr. Horowitz," he could call him "Maestro."

— The New York Times

In 1986, Horowitz announced that he would return to the Soviet Union for the first time since 1925 to give recitals in Moscow and Leningrad. In the new atmosphere of communication and understanding between the USSR and the US, these concerts were seen as events of political, as well as musical, significance. Most of the tickets for the Moscow concert were reserved for the Soviet elite and few sold to the general public. This resulted in a number of Moscow Conservatory students crashing the concert. The recital was televised internationally; in the United States, the concert was broadcast by CBS as part of a special two-hour edition of Sunday Morning, which also followed Horowitz's preparations.

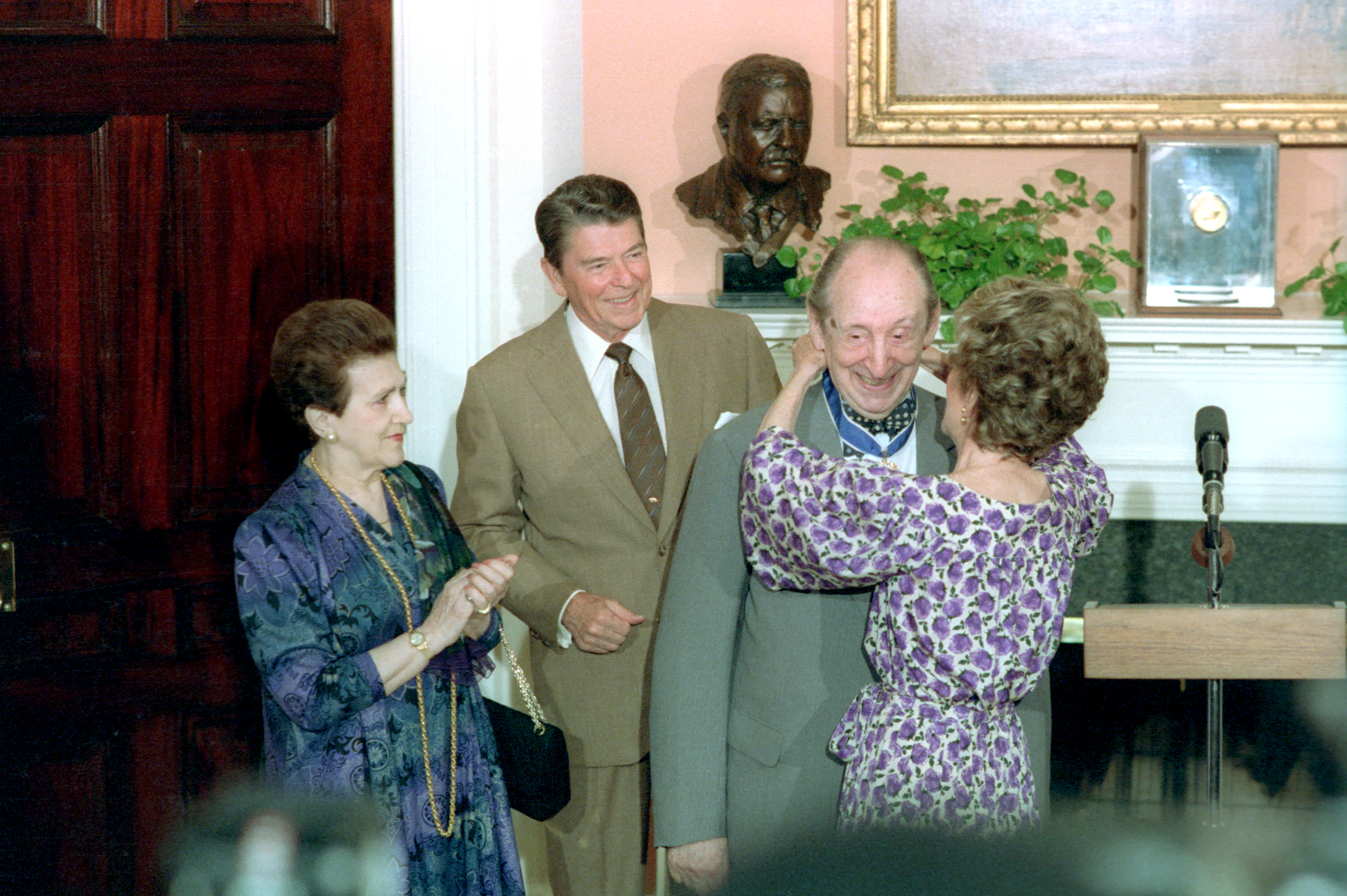
Horowitz, accompanied by his wife Wanda Toscanini, receives the Presidential Medal of Freedom from President Ronald Reagan and First Lady Nancy Reagan (presenting it to him)

Following the Russian concerts, Horowitz toured several European cities, including Berlin, Amsterdam, and London. In June, Horowitz redeemed himself to the Japanese with a trio of well-received performances in Tokyo. Later that year he was awarded the Presidential Medal of Freedom, the highest civilian honor bestowed by the United States, by President Ronald Reagan.

Horowitz's final tour took place in Europe in the spring of 1987. A video recording of his penultimate public recital, Horowitz in Vienna, was released in 1991. His final recital, at the Musikhalle Hamburg, Germany, took place on June 21, 1987. The concert was recorded, but not released until 2008. He continued to record for the remainder of his life.

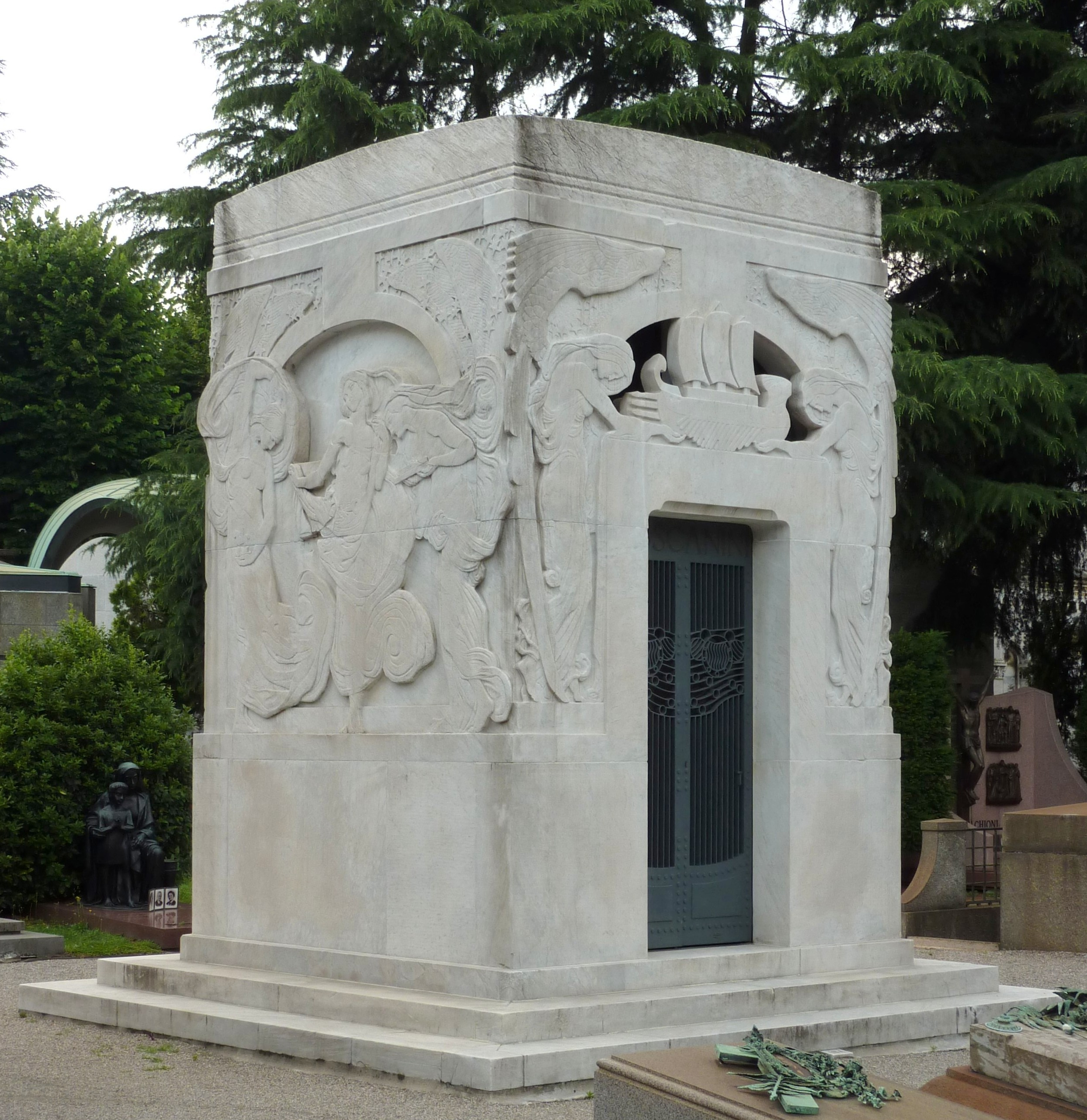
The Toscanini family tomb in Cimitero Monumentale, Milan, Italy, where Horowitz is buried.

== Death ==
Horowitz died on November 5, 1989, in New York City, of a heart attack, aged 86. "I saw him sitting in the chair with still eyes...and boom...and then on the floor, flat on the floor" recounted his wife. She continued: "But the thing that is interesting, that I didn't get rid of that chair. You know, somebody would think get rid of the chair — no. I sit, every day, in that chair" as her eyes watered. He was buried in the Toscanini family tomb in the Cimitero Monumentale, Milan, Italy.

== Repertoire, technique and performance style ==
External audio
- You may hear Vladimir Horowitz performing Pyotr Tchaikovsky's "Piano Concerto No.1 " with George Szell conducting the New York Philharmonic in 1953 Link

Horowitz is best known for his performances of the Romantic piano repertoire. Many consider Horowitz's first recording of the Liszt Sonata in B minor in 1932 to be the definitive reading of that piece, even after over 90 years and more than 100 performances committed to disc by other pianists. Other pieces with which he was closely associated were Scriabin's Étude in D-sharp minor, Chopin's Ballade No. 1, and many Rachmaninoff miniatures, including Polka de W.R.. Horowitz was acclaimed for his recordings of the Rachmaninoff Piano Concerto No. 3, and his performance before Rachmaninoff awed the composer, who proclaimed "he swallowed it whole. He had the courage, the intensity, the daring." Horowitz was also known for his performances of quieter, more intimate works, including Schumann's Kinderszenen, Scarlatti's keyboard sonatas, keyboard sonatas by Clementi and several Mozart and Haydn sonatas. His recordings of Scarlatti and Clementi are particularly prized, and he is credited with having helped revive interest in the two composers, whose works had been seldom performed or recorded during the first half of the 20th century.

During World War II, Horowitz championed contemporary Russian music, giving the American premieres of Prokofiev's Piano Sonatas Nos. 6, 7 and 8 (the so-called "War Sonatas") and Kabalevsky's Piano Sonatas Nos. 2 and 3. Horowitz also premiered the Piano Sonata and Excursions of Samuel Barber.

He was known for his versions of several of Liszt's Hungarian Rhapsodies. The Second Rhapsody was recorded in 1953, during Horowitz's 25th anniversary concert at Carnegie Hall, and he said it was the most difficult of his arrangements. Horowitz's transcriptions of note include his composition Variations on a Theme from Carmen and The Stars and Stripes Forever by John Philip Sousa. The latter became a favorite with audiences, who would anticipate its performance as an encore. Transcriptions aside, Horowitz was not opposed to altering the text of compositions to improve what he considered "unpianistic" writing or structural clumsiness. In 1940, with the composer's consent, Horowitz created his own performance edition of Rachmaninoff's Second Piano Sonata from the 1913 original and 1931 revised versions, which pianists including Ruth Laredo and Hélène Grimaud have used. He substantially rewrote Mussorgsky's Pictures at an Exhibition to make the work more effective on the grounds that Mussorgsky was not a pianist and did not understand the possibilities of the instrument. Horowitz also altered short passages in some works, such as substituting interlocking octaves for chromatic scales in Chopin's Scherzo in B minor. This was in marked contrast to many pianists of the post–19th-century era, who considered the composer's text sacrosanct. Living composers whose works Horowitz played (among them Rachmaninoff, Prokofiev, and Poulenc) invariably praised Horowitz's performances of their work even when he took liberties with their scores.

Horowitz's interpretations were well received by concert audiences, but not by some critics. Virgil Thomson was consistently critical of Horowitz as a "master of distortion and exaggeration" in his reviews appearing in the New York Herald Tribune. Horowitz claimed to take Thomson's remarks as complimentary, saying that Michelangelo and El Greco were also masters of distortion. In the 1980 edition of Grove's Dictionary of Music and Musicians, Michael Steinberg wrote that Horowitz "illustrates that an astounding instrumental gift carries no guarantee about musical understanding." New York Times music critic Harold C. Schonberg countered that reviewers such as Thomson and Steinberg were unfamiliar with 19th-century performance practices that informed Horowitz's musical approach. Many pianists (such as Martha Argerich and Maurizio Pollini) held Horowitz in high regard, and the pianist Friedrich Gulda referred to Horowitz as the "Super-God of the piano".

Horowitz's style frequently involved vast dynamic contrasts, with overwhelming double-fortissimos followed by sudden delicate pianissimos. He was able to produce an extraordinary volume of sound from the piano without producing a harsh tone. He elicited an exceptionally wide range of tonal color, and his taut, precise attack was noticeable even in his renditions of technically undemanding pieces such as the Chopin Mazurkas. He is known for his octave technique; he could play precise passages in octaves extraordinarily quickly. When asked by the pianist Tedd Joselson how he practiced octaves, Horowitz gave a demonstration and Joselson reported, "He practiced them exactly as we were all taught to do." Music critic and biographer Harvey Sachs submitted that Horowitz may have been "the beneficiary—and perhaps also the victim—of an extraordinary central nervous system and an equally great sensitivity to tone color." Oscar Levant, in his book The Memoirs of an Amnesiac, wrote that Horowitz's octaves were "brilliant, accurate and etched out like bullets." He asked Horowitz "whether he shipped them ahead or carried them with him on tour."

Horowitz's hand position was unusual in that the palm was often below the level of the key surface. He frequently played chords with straight fingers, and the little finger of his right hand was often curled up until it needed to play a note; to Harold C. Schonberg, "it was like a strike of a cobra." For all the excitement of his playing, Horowitz rarely raised his hands higher than the piano's fallboard. Byron Janis, one of Horowitz's students, said that Horowitz tried to teach him that technique but it didn't work for him. Horowitz's body was immobile, and his face seldom reflected anything other than intense concentration.

Horowitz preferred to perform on Sunday afternoons, as he felt audiences were better rested and more attentive than on weekday evenings.

== Awards and recognitions ==
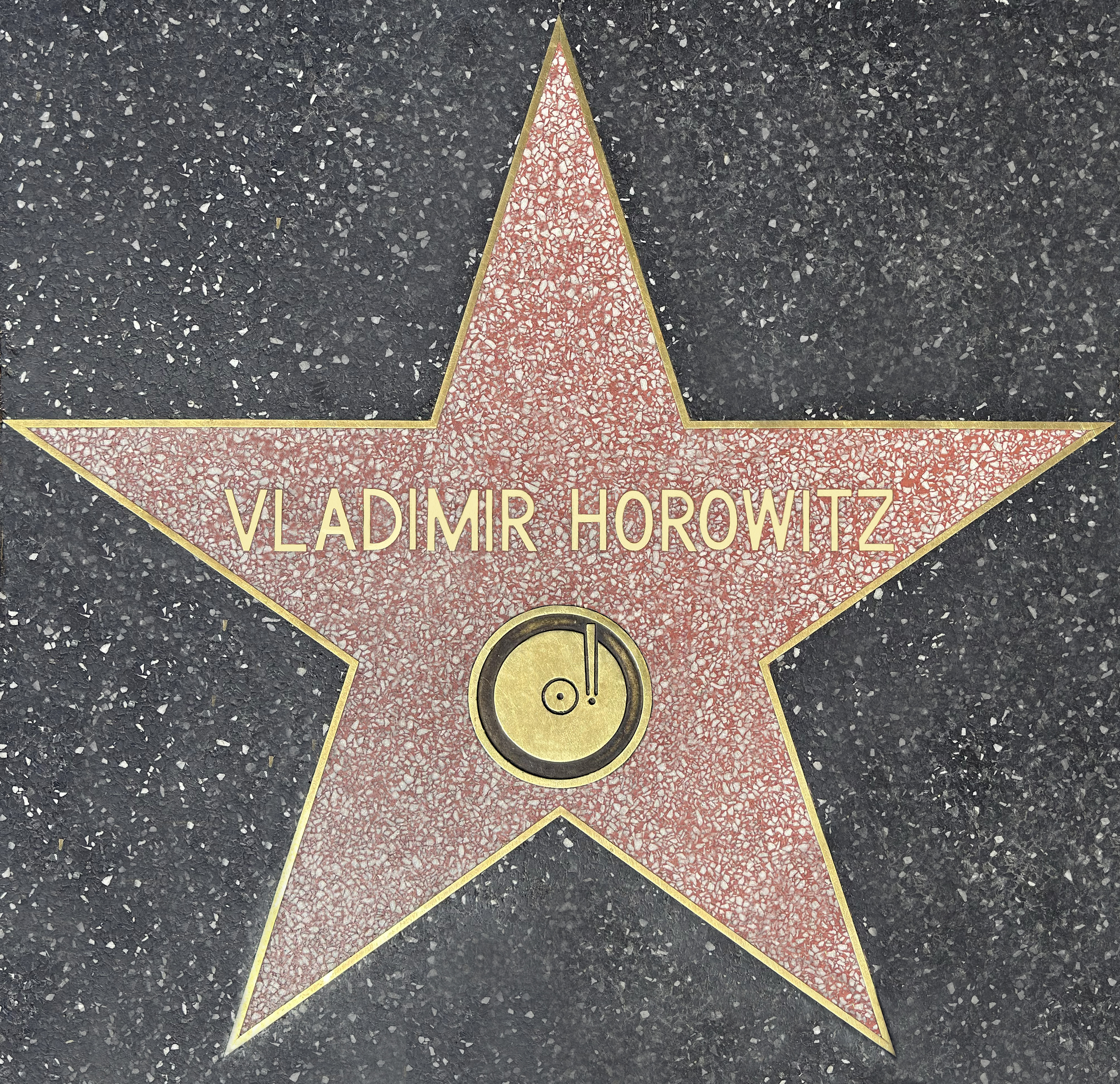
The star for Vladimir Horowitz on the Hollywood Walk of Fame

- Grammy Award for Best Classical Performance – Instrumental Soloist or Soloists (with or without orchestra)
  - 1968 Horowitz in Concert: Haydn, Schumann, Scriabin, Debussy, Mozart, Chopin (Columbia 45572)
  - 1969 Horowitz on Television: Chopin, Scriabin, Scarlatti, Horowitz (Columbia 7106)
  - 1987 Horowitz: The Studio Recordings, New York 1985 (Deutsche Grammophon 419217)
- Grammy Award for Best Instrumental Soloist(s) Performance (with orchestra)
  - 1979 Golden Jubilee Concert, Rachmaninoff: Piano Concerto No. 3 (RCA CLR1 2633)
  - 1989 Horowitz Plays Mozart: Piano Concerto No. 23 (Deutsche Grammophon 423287)
- Grammy Award for Best Instrumental Soloist Performance (without orchestra)
  - 1963 Columbia Records Presents Vladimir Horowitz
  - 1964 The Sound of Horowitz
  - 1965 Vladimir Horowitz plays Beethoven, Debussy, Chopin
  - 1966 Horowitz at Carnegie Hall – An Historic Return
  - 1972 Horowitz Plays Rachmaninoff (Etudes-Tableaux Piano Music; Sonatas) (Columbia M-30464)
  - 1973 Horowitz Plays Chopin (Columbia M-30643)
  - 1974 Horowitz Plays Scriabin (Columbia M-31620)
  - 1977 The Horowitz Concerts 1975/76 (RCA ARL1-1766)
  - 1979 The Horowitz Concerts 1977/78 (RCA ARL1-2548)
  - 1980 The Horowitz Concerts 1978/79 (RCA ARL1-3433)
  - 1982 The Horowitz Concerts 1979/80 (RCA ARL1-3775)
  - 1988 Horowitz in Moscow (Deutsche Grammophon 419499)
  - 1991 The Last Recording (Sony SK 45818)
  - 1993 Horowitz Discovered Treasures: Chopin, Liszt, Scarlatti, Scriabin, Clementi (Sony 48093)
- Grammy Award for Best Classical Album:
  - 1963 Columbia Records Presents Vladimir Horowitz
  - 1966 Horowitz at Carnegie Hall: An Historic Return
  - 1972 Horowitz Plays Rachmaninoff (Etudes-Tableaux Piano Music; Sonatas)
  - 1978 Concert of the Century with Leonard Bernstein (conductor), the New York Philharmonic, Dietrich Fischer-Dieskau, Vladimir Horowitz, Yehudi Menuhin, Mstislav Rostropovich, Isaac Stern, Lyndon Woodside
  - 1987 Horowitz: The Studio Recordings, New York 1985 (Deutsche Grammophon 419217)
  - 1988 Horowitz in Moscow (Deutsche Grammophon 419499)
- Grammy Lifetime Achievement Award, 1990
- Prix Mondial du Disque
  - 1970 Kreisleriana

=== Miscellaneous ===
- 1972 – Honorary Member of the Royal Academy of Music (London)
- 1982 – Wolf Foundation Prize for Music
- 1985 – Commandeur de la Légion d'honneur from the French Government
- 1985 – Order of Merit of the Italian Republic
- 1986 – United States Presidential Medal of Freedom
- 2012 – Gramophone Hall of Fame entrant

== Notes, references and sources ==
=== Sources ===
- Bernhard, Thomas (1991). The Loser: A Novel. Dawson, Jack (trans.). University of Chicago Press. ISBN 0-226-04388-6.
- Dubal, David (1989). The Art of the Piano. Amadeus Press. ISBN 1-57467-088-3.
- Dubal, David (1991). Evenings with Horowitz: A Personal Portrait. Carol Publishers. ISBN 1-57467-086-7.
- Dubal, David (1993). Remembering Horowitz: 125 Pianists Recall a Legend. Schirmer Books. ISBN 0-02-870676-5.
- Epstein, Helen. Music Talks (1988) McGraw-Hill (a long profile that appeared in the New York Times Magazine of Horowitz, 1978)
- Plaskin, Glenn (1983). Horowitz: A Biography of Vladimir Horowitz. New York: William Morrow. ISBN 0-356-09179-1
- Schonberg, Harold C. (1992). Horowitz: His Life and Music. Simon and Schuster. ISBN 0-671-72568-8.
- Toeplitz, Uri (2007). "Horowitz, Vladimir". In Skolnik, Fred; Berenbaum, Michael (eds.). Encyclopaedia Judaica: Her–Int. Vol. 9 (2nd ed.). Macmillan Reference USA. p. 544. ISBN 978-0-02-865937-4.
