= Walter Toscanini =

Italian-American historian and choreographer (1898-1971)

Walter Toscanini (March 19, 1898 — July, 1971) was an Italian-American historian and ballet choreographer. He was the son of Arturo Toscanini and Carla De Martini, and brother to sisters Wanda Toscanini (1908–1998) and Wally Toscanini (1900–1991). He was married to Lucia Fornaroli, a La Scala ballerina. His son was Walfredo Toscanini (1929–2011).

== Collection ==
- Cia Fornaroli and Walter Toscanini papers, 1953

Walter Toscanini and Lucia Fornaroli collected more than 3,300 dance related items, including prints, paintings, writings, which Toscanini then donated to the New York Public Library Jerome Robbins Dance Division, where it is entitled the Cia Fornaroli Collection.
