= Wanda Toscanini Horowitz =

Daughter of Arturo Toscanini

Wanda Giorgina Toscanini Horowitz (December 7, 1907, Milan, Italy, – August 21, 1998) was the daughter of the conductor Arturo Toscanini and the wife of pianist Vladimir Horowitz.

As a child, Wanda studied piano and voice. She never pursued a professional music career, fearing she could never live up to her father's exacting standards. Despite this, she was one of the few people who was willing to stand up to her father. When Arturo Toscanini refused to speak with her sister, Wally, following her affair with a married man, it was Wanda who confronted her father and insisted he reestablish contact. She was equally direct with her husband, whom she married in 1933. In the 1950s, when Horowitz was playing a Schubert sonata, she complained of the work's length, which persuaded the pianist to forgo a repeat. She pointedly declined to accompany her husband for much of his 1983 tour, when he refused to accept that medications were adversely affecting his playing.

== Marriage to Vladimir Horowitz ==
Horowitz met and married Wanda Toscanini in 1933 when her father invited Horowitz to be the soloist in Beethoven's Piano Concerto No. 5. Mrs. Horowitz took a central part in arranging her husband's activities, in fact in nearly all aspects of his life.

In 1934 Wanda gave birth to their only child, daughter Sonia, who died in 1975. Wanda said that Sonia's death was the greatest agony a mother could bear. More than a decade after Sonia's death, she was observed bursting into tears at the mention of Sonia's name.

Wanda and Horowitz separated in 1948. Byron Janis, one of Horowitz's students, has written that he and Wanda were involved in a brief affair during this period. Horowitz and Wanda reconciled in 1951. In the aftermath of Horowitz’s 1953 nervous breakdown, she remained by his side. While she took pride in being married to the legendary virtuoso, she also confided that it was, at times "a cross to bear". However, others have implied that Wanda's stern personality, in part, led to Horowitz's breakdown. Arthur Rubinstein stated that "Wanda was a very hard woman — hard as stone, and this was undoubtedly a factor that led to Volodya's collapse".

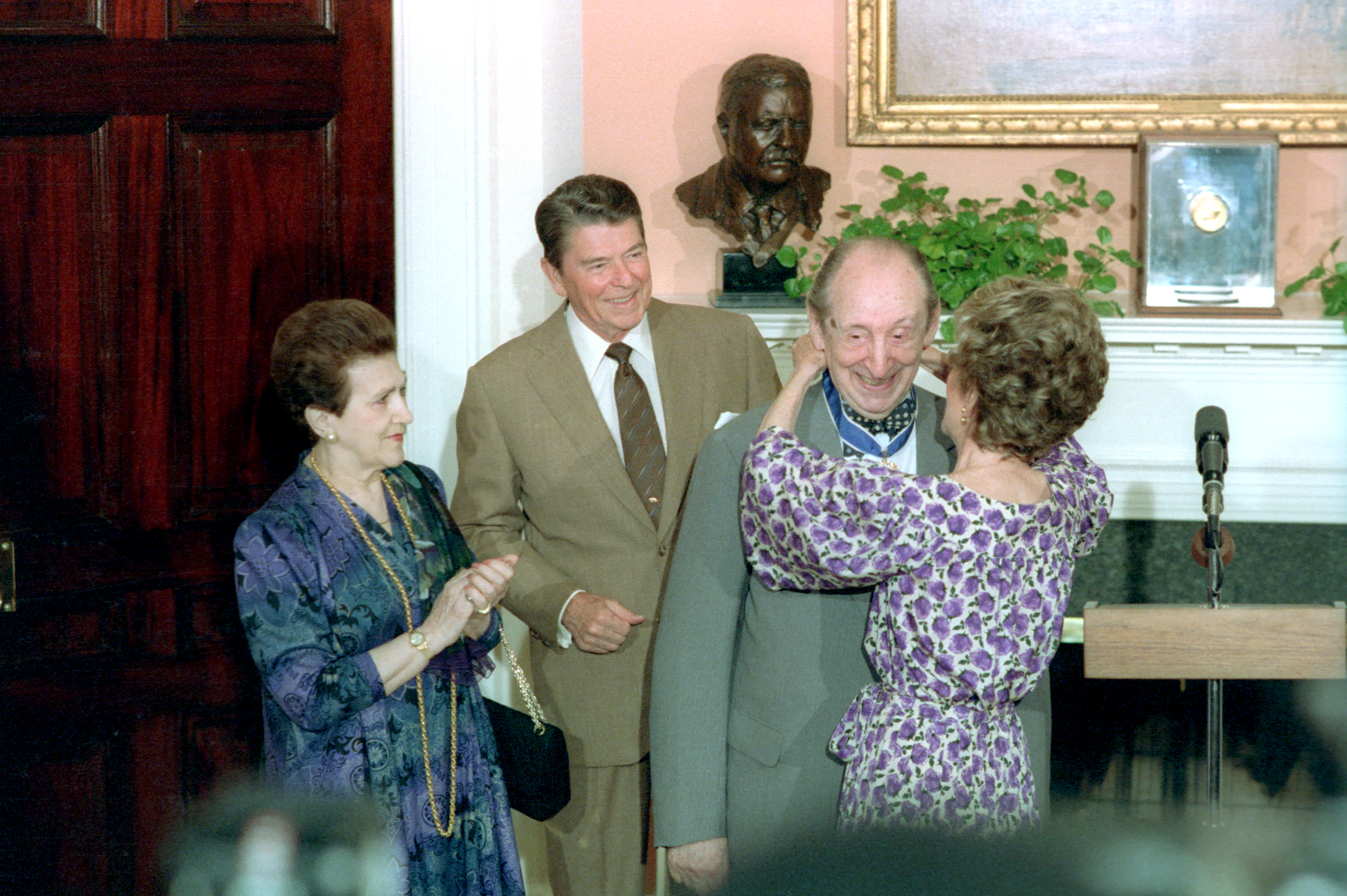
Wanda Toscanini Horowitz looking on, as her husband, Vladimir Horowitz, receives the Presidential Medal of Freedom from President Ronald Reagan and First Lady Nancy Reagan (presenting it to him)

Despite being raised Catholic, Wanda was opposed to the Catholic Church’s positions on many issues including birth control. Like her husband, Wanda held firmly liberal political views. She once referred to Ronald Reagan as "a second-rate actor and a second-rate President".

Horowitz left nearly all of his estate ($6 million to $8 million) to his wife. Wanda bought a 200-year-old farm house that she named "Pinci's Acres" (Pinci was Wanda's nickname for Horowitz) in Ashley Falls, Massachusetts, and stocked it with American antiques and Horowitz memorabilia. She then divided her time between this home and the New York City townhouse. An animal lover who volunteered for the ASPCA, she adopted several stray cats.

Wanda was entombed alongside her husband in the Toscanini family crypt at Cimitero Monumentale in Milan. In May, 2004, vandals broke into the tomb and opened her coffin, possibly searching for jewelry.

About her marriage, Wanda said: "To be the daughter of Toscanini, I didn't have any merit because I could have been born to anybody. But to be the wife of Horowitz, in that I take a little bit of pride".

Wanda Toscanini Horowitz appeared in several filmed documentaries about her husband, most notably The Last Romantic, in which she responded to her husband's artistry and reflected on her life in the world of music as daughter and wife of two incomparable musicians. A friend of Woody Allen, she had a small speaking part in his film Crimes and Misdemeanors (1989).
