= Piano Sonata No. 6 (Prokofiev) =

1940 piano sonata by Sergei Prokofiev

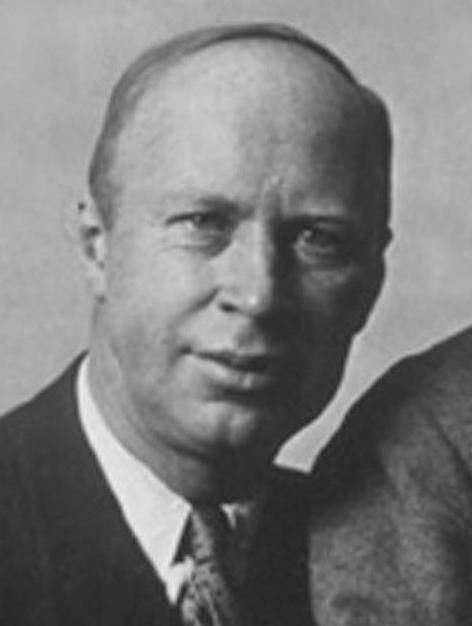
Sergei Prokofiev in 1936

Sergei Prokofiev's Piano Sonata No. 6 in A major, Op. 82 is a sonata for solo piano, the first of the "War Sonatas". It was composed in 1940 and first performed on 8 April of that year in Moscow, with the composer at the piano.

== Music ==
The work is in four movements:

1. Allegro moderato (in A major)
2. Allegretto (in E major)
3. Tempo di valzer lentissimo (in C major)
4. Vivace (in A minor, ending in A major)

=== I. Allegro moderato ===
The first movement introduces the main motto, where the melody is played in minor thirds and parallel major thirds. This makes the movement tonally unstable, since both A major and A minor are established. Also, the motto is accompanied by a rising and falling augmented 4th between notes A and D♯, creating sharp dissonances. Thus, it already introduces the uncertainty of the work. The greater part of it is dominated by grinding dissonances and frequent modulation, further increasing the despair of the work. Throughout most of the piece, there is a lack of key signature.

=== II. Allegretto ===
The second movement has been described as having a march-like sound with staccato chords. There is also a very bouncy, humorous, and jaunty character to the outer sections of the piece. The middle section is more melodic and a little more pensive and mysterious.

=== III. Tempo di valzer lentissimo ===
The third movement is similar to a waltz, slower and romantic in the outer sections, but with a stormy, bell-like middle section.

=== IV. Vivace ===
The closing movement is a headlong rondo. The middle section recalls the opening motto from the first movement, albeit with the first note missing. In the extremely virtuosic coda, the motto, transformed and abbreviated, is hammered out violently amid swirls of harried notes, and then played in full in rapid, stammering descending chords. The chaos stops abruptly in where the pattern of repeated notes sounds in a much slower and determined way, as if asserting control over the proceedings. The willful repetitions of the “motto” motive that opened the sonata bring the work to a violently assertive close.
