= Villa Amalia =

Villa Amalia may refer to:

- Villa Amalia (novel), a novel by Pascal Quignard
- Villa Amalia (film), a 2009 French film based on the novel
- Villa Amalia (Athens), an anti-authoritarian squat in Athens, Greece
