= Valentina Chico =

Italian actress

- Born: 2 May 1976 (age 49); Rome, Italy
- Occupations: Film, theatre and television actress
- Years active: 1994–present

Valentina Chico (born 2 May 1976) is an Italian television, film and theatre actress. She is best known for the lead role of Caterina Masi in the third season of popular Italian drama series Incantesimo and for playing Marta in the 1996 film Follow Your Heart.

== Biography ==
She studied acting in Rome under Pietro Gallina, and later under Pierpaolo Sepe and Geraldine Baron. She also obtained a diploma in solfeggio at the Conservatorio Santa Cecilia in Rome.

Chico made her acting debut in 1994 in the Italo-German film Mario and the Magician by Klaus Maria Brandauer. In 1996 she starred alongside Virna Lisi in Cristina Comencini's Follow Your Heart, based on Susanna Tamaro's novel of the same name. In 1997 she starred in the short films La guerra è finita and Brividi blu, and in 2000 in the feature film Albania Blues, directed by Nico Cirasola. In 2005 she starred in the short film Una giornata nera, for which she won Best Actress in the Corti Pluriel 2005 section of the Venice Film Festival. In 2006 she starred in Matteo Rovere's short Homo homini lupus, 2007 winner of the Nastro d'Argento for best short film. In 2008 she portrayed Iris Cantelli in Larry Weinstein's Toscanini: In His Own Words.

On television, she played the lead role in the TV movie Con gli occhi dell'assassino. In 2000, she was cast in the lead role of Caterina Masi in the third season of Incantesimo. She portrayed the same role in the fourth season of Incantesimo in 2001. In 2003 she returned in some episodes of the series' sixth season as a guest star.

Although continuing to work for television and cinema, Chico has increasingly focused her career on theatre since the early 2000s. Among her notable theatrical works is the lead role in The Last Harem, alongside Serra Yılmaz, which ran for a record 10 years.

In 2022 Chico played a minor role in the Italian TV series Crush - La storia di Stella.

== Filmography ==
=== Film ===
Year	Title	Role	Notes
1994	Mario and the Magician	Silvestra	
1996	Follow Your Heart	Marta	
1997	I Grimaldi		
2005	Taxi Lovers	Linda	
2006	Homo homini lupus	Monica Hotmann	Film won Nastro d'Argento for best short film
2008	Toscanini: In His Own Words	Iris Cantelli	
2012	Canepazzo	Stefano Costa's Wife	
2017	La casa di famiglia	Elisa	

=== Television ===
Year	Title	Role	Notes
2000–2003	Incantesimo	Caterina Masi	Lead role 43 episodes
2001	Con gli occhi dell'assassino	Laura Monti	Television film
2012	Un passo dal cielo	Sara Mayer	1 episode
2013	Che Dio ci aiuti	Manuela	1 episode
2006–2018	Don Matteo	Micol Guarini; Sonia Barani; Norma Gradi	3 episodes
2020	L'allieva		1 episode
2022	Crush - La storia di Stella	Eva	
