= Hanussen =

Hanussen can refer to:

- Erik Jan Hanussen (1889-1933), a clairvoyant, mentalist, occultist, and astrologer
- Hanussen (1955 film), a 1955 German film about Erik Jan Hanussen
- Hanussen (1988 film), a 1988 Hungarian film about Erik Jan Hanussen
