= Con gli occhi dell'assassino =

- Written by: Danielle Stroppa
- Directed by: Corrado Colombo
- Starring: Valentina Chico; Fabio Fulco; Nino Castelnuovo; Patrizia Pellegrino
- Music by: Elio Polizzi
- Country of origin: Italy
- Original language: Italian

Production
- Producers: Maria Désirée Villevielle Bideri; Maria Flavia Villevielle Bideri
- Cinematography: Roberto Girometti
- Editors: Osvaldo Bargero; Francesca Era
- Running time: 90 min

Original release
- Network: Rai 2
- Release: 2001

Con gli occhi dell'assassino (English: With the Killer's Eyes) is an Italian TV movie produced by RAI television. Directed by Corrado Colombo, it stars Valentina Chico, Nino Castelnuovo, Fabio Fulco and Patrizia Pellegrino. The movie was aired on Rai 2 in 2001, and had also remarkable success abroad.

== Plot ==
Laura Monti witnesses firsthand, through the killer's eyes, a series of murders that share common elements: the same weapon, the same type of victim, and the same execution ritual involving lipstick and water. Furthermore, all victims have a connection with wealthy gynecologist Ernesto Longhi. Laura is distraught and unable to cope with this traumatic experience, because in addition to experiencing the crimes firsthand, she is also personally involved. It will be discovered that she was adopted and that she has a twin sister with serious mental health issues. Her adoptive parents rejected her because they feared raising a troubled girl, who will ultimately prove to be responsible for the crimes and who, thanks to facial plastic surgery, will become Laura's unexpected best friend.

== Cast ==
- Valentina Chico as Laura Monti
- Maddalena Maggi as Linda
- Fabio Fulco as Raul Lorenzi
- Sonia Scotti
- Nino Castelnuovo as Ernesto Longhi
- Patrizia Pellegrino as Carla
- Marioletta Bideri
- Valentina Lainati as Blanche Longhi
- Brigitte Christensen
