= La Casa del Buon Ritorno =

1986 film by Beppe Cino

The House of the Blue Shadows
- Directed by: Beppe Cino
- Screenplay by: Beppe Cino
- Story by: Beppe Cino
- Produced by: Remo Angioli; Beppe Cino
- Starring: Amanda Sandrelli
- Cinematography: Antonio Minutolo
- Edited by: Emanuele Foglietti
- Music by: Carlo Siliotto
- Production company: Moviemachine S.r.l.
- Distributed by: C.R.C./Real Film
- Release dates: 31 August 1986 (Venice Film Festival); 13 February 1987 (Italy)
- Running time: 91 minutes
- Country: Italy
- Language: Italian

La Casa del Buon Ritorno (transl. The House of Good Returns) is a 1986 Italian giallo written and directed by Beppe Cino. It is also known as The House of the Blue Shadows. The film was theatrically released in Germany as Das Haus der Blauen Schatten (The House With Blue Shutters).

== Plot ==
A little girl is pushed off a balcony to her death, and her murderer is never found. Fifteen years later, a young man named Luca and his fiancée Margit return to the house for a visit. Memories start returning slowly to Luca, and he begins to unravel the mystery of who killed the little girl. A strange woman named Ayesha turns up and unnerves Luca. Then murders begin to occur.

== Cast ==
- Amanda Sandrelli as Margit
- Stefano Gabrini as Luca
- Lola Ledda as Lola
- Fiammetta Carena as Ayesha
- Francesco Costa as Bruno
- Eleonora Salvadori as Luca's mother
- Stanis Ledda (as Luca as a boy)
- Elvira Castellano

== Production ==
La Casa del Buron Ritorno was budgeted at 300 million Italian lire and was shot in 12 days on 16mm film in and around Rome. Actress Amanda Sandrelli commented that the film was shot quickly, "like pulling a tooth".

== Release ==
La Casa del Buon Ritorno was first exhibited at the Venice Film Festival on August 31, 1986. It was distributed theatrically in Italy by C.R.C./Real Film on 13 February 1987. The film was never dubbed into English and did not receive any theatrical release in the United States or United Kingdom.

== Reception ==
The film received negative reviews on its initial premiere. Lietta Tornabuoni in La Stampa stated that the film was "below an acceptable professional level" and that Stefano Gabrini could not act. Maurizio Porro of Corriere della Sera stated that the film was not clear whether the film wanted to be a "thriller, a horror, a love story. ... or an analysis session: however, the unpleasant thing is that it seems like something already seen, and it wishes to remain deliberately obscure."

Robert Firsching of AllMovie later described the film as an "atmospheric giallo" that "plays with the theme a bit more cleverly than most." The review noted it recycled elements from older films such as Deep Red, Formula for a Murder and Onibaba but that the film was a "clever combination of rip-off and synthesis which has always been a hallmark of the national cinema, creates a unique, seemingly original story."
