= Giuseppe Zeno =

Italian actor

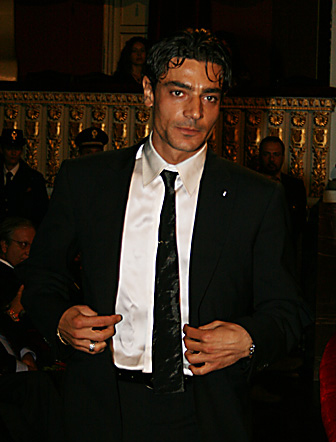
- Giuseppe Zeno in 2007
- Born: May 8, 1976 (age 50); Cercola, Campania, Italy
- Occupation: Actor
- Spouse: Margareth Madè (m. 2016)
- Children: 2

Giuseppe Zeno (born May 8, 1976) is an Italian actor.

== Career ==
Giuseppe Zeno was born in Cercola, Campania, but he lived in Ercolano and in Vibo Marina. He attended the Nautical Institute in Pizzo Calabro and received a diploma as a sea captain, and then attended the Academy of Dramatic Arts in Calabria.

In 1997, he debuted on the stage in the Greek tragedy The Trojan Women of Euripides. He was then cast in theatrical productions in Argentina and other countries in South America.

Zeno also appeared in several television series, such as The Sopranos, Incantesimo, Carabineri, Un Posto al Sole, Gente di mare, St. Giuseppe Moscati: Doctor to the Poor, Rossella, Squadra antimafia – Palermo oggi, Il clan dei camorristi, as the boss Francesco Russo O' Malese, L'onore e il rispetto, where he played the lead role of Santi Fortebracci, and Il paradiso delle signore.

== Personal life ==
On August 20, 2016, Zeno married Italian actress Margareth Madè in a Catholic ceremony. The couple has two daughters: Angelica (born November 8, 2017) and Beatrice (born September 4, 2020).

== Appearances ==
=== Theater ===
- The Trojan Women (1997)
- Non tutti i ladri vengono per nuocere (1998)
- Gli imbianchini non-hanno ricordi (1998)
- La frontiera (1999)
- Babilonia (2000)
- Oresteia (2001)
- A Midsummer Night's Dream (2001)
- Medea (2002)
- A View from the Bridge (2003–2005)
- La lingua pugnalata (2004)
- Il vento (2006)
- Bang! ...ancora un giallo a Fumetti!?! (2011)
- Il compleanno di Baudelaire (2013)

=== Film ===
- My Generation (1996)
- Un mondo d'amore (2002)
- DeKronos – Il demone del tempo (2005)
- Liberarsi – Figli di una rivoluzione minore (2008)
- La fabbrica dei tedeschi (2008)
- Francesco di Paola – La ricerca della verità (2009)
- Il sesso aggiunto (2011)
- Tenderness (2017)
- My Paper Dolls (2023)
- The Ritual Killer (2023)

=== Television ===
- Piccoli angeli (1994)
- La voce del sangue (1999)
- The Sopranos (2000)
- Incantesimo (2002–2003)
- Carabinieri (2003)
- Un Posto al Sole (2004–2005)
- Gente di mare (2005–2007)
- L'onore e il rispetto (2006, 2009)
- Assunta Spina (2006)
- Graffio di tigre (2007)
- St. Giuseppe Moscati: Doctor to the Poor (2007)
- Fuga con Marlene (2007)
- Artemisia Sanchez (2008)
- Pane e libertà (2009)
- Gli ultimi del Paradiso (2010)
- Rossella (2011)
- Squadra antimafia – Palermo oggi (2011)
- Il clan dei camorristi (2013)
- Le mani dentro la città (2014)
- Il paradiso delle signore (2015)
- La sonata del silencio (2016)
- Scomparsa (2017)
- Tutto può succedere (2018)
- Mentre ero vida (2019)
- Imma Tataranni: Deputy Prosecutor (2019)
- Come una madre (2020)
- Mina Settembre (2021)
- Storia di una famiglia per bene (2021)
- Luce dei tuoi occhi (2021)
- Blanca (2021)
- Tutto per mio figlio (2022)
- The Life You Wanted (2024)
