= Follow Your Heart (1996 film) =

1996 film

- Italian: Va' dove ti porta il cuore
- Directed by: Cristina Comencini
- Written by: Roberta Mazzoni; Cristina Comencini
- Based on: Follow Your Heart by Susanna Tamaro
- Starring: Virna Lisi; Margherita Buy; Galatea Ranzi; Valentina Chico; Massimo Ghini; Tchéky Karyo
- Cinematography: Roberto Forza
- Edited by: Nino Baragli
- Music by: Claudio Capponi; Alessio Vlad
- Distributed by: Filmauro
- Release date: 1996
- Country: Italy
- Language: Italian
- Box office: 7.1 billion lira (Italy)

Follow Your Heart (Italian: Va' dove ti porta il cuore) is a 1996 Italian romantic drama film written and directed by Cristina Comencini. It is based on the novel with the same name by Susanna Tamaro.

For her performance Virna Lisi won a Globo d'oro and a Nastro d'Argento for best actress.

== Plot ==
The film follows the unhappy lives of three generations of women – Olga, her late daughter Ilaria and her granddaughter Marta – as recounted by Olga in a letter she is writing to Marta before dying. Written in the form of a diary, the letter is an attempt to expiate the family trauma in order to free Marta from the misery she appears destined to.

Olga starts by recalling her childhood and her first clashes with her middle-class parents as a teenager. She has an affair with a married man, whose identity she does not disclose, falling pregnant with Ilaria shortly before his death. Her daughter also grows up as a turbulent young woman, developing a conflictual relationship with her mother which further deteriorates as she returns from a trip to Turkey pregnant with Marta. During a fight, Olga reveals to Ilaria the identity of her father, upsetting her to the point that, as she drives away, she crashes her car into a tree and is killed.

Through the love she expresses in the letter, Olga manages to relieve Marta's burdensome familial legacy, allowing her to "go where her heart takes her".

== Cast ==
- Virna Lisi as Olga
- Margherita Buy as young Olga
- Sara Sanvincenti as child Olga
- Galatea Ranzi as Ilaria
- Massimo Ghini as Augusto
- Tchéky Karyo as Ernesto
- Valentina Chico as Marta
- Lavinia Guglielman as child Marta
- Luigi Diberti as Olga's father
- Anna Teresa Rossini as Olga's mother
- Valeria Sabel as Elsa Razman
- Maria Grazia Bon as Marta's nanny
- Stefania Graziosi
- Francesca Bortolotti
- Stefano Galante
- Gianfranco Saletta
