= Miracle in Palermo! =

- Directed by: Beppe Cino
- Written by: Beppe Cino
- Produced by: Maurizio Tedesco; Marco Risi
- Cinematography: Adolfo Bartoli
- Music by: Carlo Siliotto
- Release date: 2004
- Language: Italian

Miracle in Palermo! (Italian: Miracolo a Palermo) is a 2004 Italian comedy-drama film written and directed by Beppe Cino.

== Cast ==
- Tony Sperandeo as Sparagna
- Vincent Schiavelli as Federico II
- Luigi Maria Burruano as Fofò
- Maria Grazia Cucinotta as Sara
- Michele Lucchese as Totò
- Valentina Graziano as Lina
- Alessandro Cremona as the Boss

== See also ==
- List of Italian films of 2004
