= Il giudice Mastrangelo =

- Genre: Legal drama
- Directed by: Enrico Oldoini
- Starring: Diego Abatantuono; Antonio Catania; Vittoria Piancastrelli; Nina Soldano; Gennaro Diana; Dino Abbrescia; Elena Cantarone; Riccardo Zinna; Ugo Conti; Luigi Maria Burruano; Amanda Sandrelli; Fabio Fulco; Alessia Marcuzzi
- Composer: Pivio and Aldo De Scalzi
- Country of origin: Italy
- No. of seasons: 2
- No. of episodes: 10

Original release
- Release: December 12, 2005 – May 18, 2007

Il giudice Mastrangelo is an Italian legal comedy-drama television series.

== Plot ==
Diego Abatantuono is judge (actually deputy attorney) Diego Mastrangelo, who has returned to his hometown, Lecce, after years of activity in the North. Together with him there is his sister Cristiana and the trusted driver Uelino, with whom he gives life to tasty gags, and the commissioner Federica Denza. Crime is at the center of the miniseries, with the cases that the judge will have to solve gradually.

== Cast ==
- Diego Abatantuono: Deputy attorney Diego Mastrangelo
- Alessia Marcuzzi: Attorney Claudia Nicolai (season 2)
- Antonio Catania: Uelino
- Amanda Sandrelli: Commissioner Federica Denza
- Luigi Maria Burruano: Attorney De Cesare
- Vittoria Piancastelli: Cristiana Mastrangelo
- Dino Abbrescia: Gerardo
- Fabio Fulco: Commissioner Paolo Parsani (season 2)
- Gennaro Diana: Inspector Naselli
- Riccardo Zinna: Deputy attorney Frappampina
- Elena Cantarone: Giuseppina Finzi
- Ugo Conti: Palmieri

== See also ==
- List of Italian television series
