= Beppe Cino =

Italian film director and screenwriter

- Born: Giuseppe Cino; 3 February 1947 (age 79); Caltanissetta, Italy
- Occupations: Director, screenwriter

Giuseppe "Beppe" Cino (born 3 February 1947), is an Italian director and screenwriter.

== Life and career ==
Born in Caltanissetta, Cino formed at the Centro Sperimentale di Cinematografia in Rome, graduating in 1970. The same year he started as intense activity as documentarist and as assistant director, notably collaborating with Roberto Rossellini, Vittorio De Sica and Steno. He debuted as a director with the experimental drama Il cavaliere, la morte e il diavolo, which he also wrote and produced.

== Selected filmography ==
- Il cavaliere, la morte e il diavolo (1983)
- La Casa del Buon Ritorno/ House of the Blue Shadows (1986)
- Breath of Life (1990)
- Miracle in Palermo! (2004)
