= Vanni Corbellini =

Italian actor and director

Vanni Corbellini (born 15 February 1955) is an Italian actor and director.

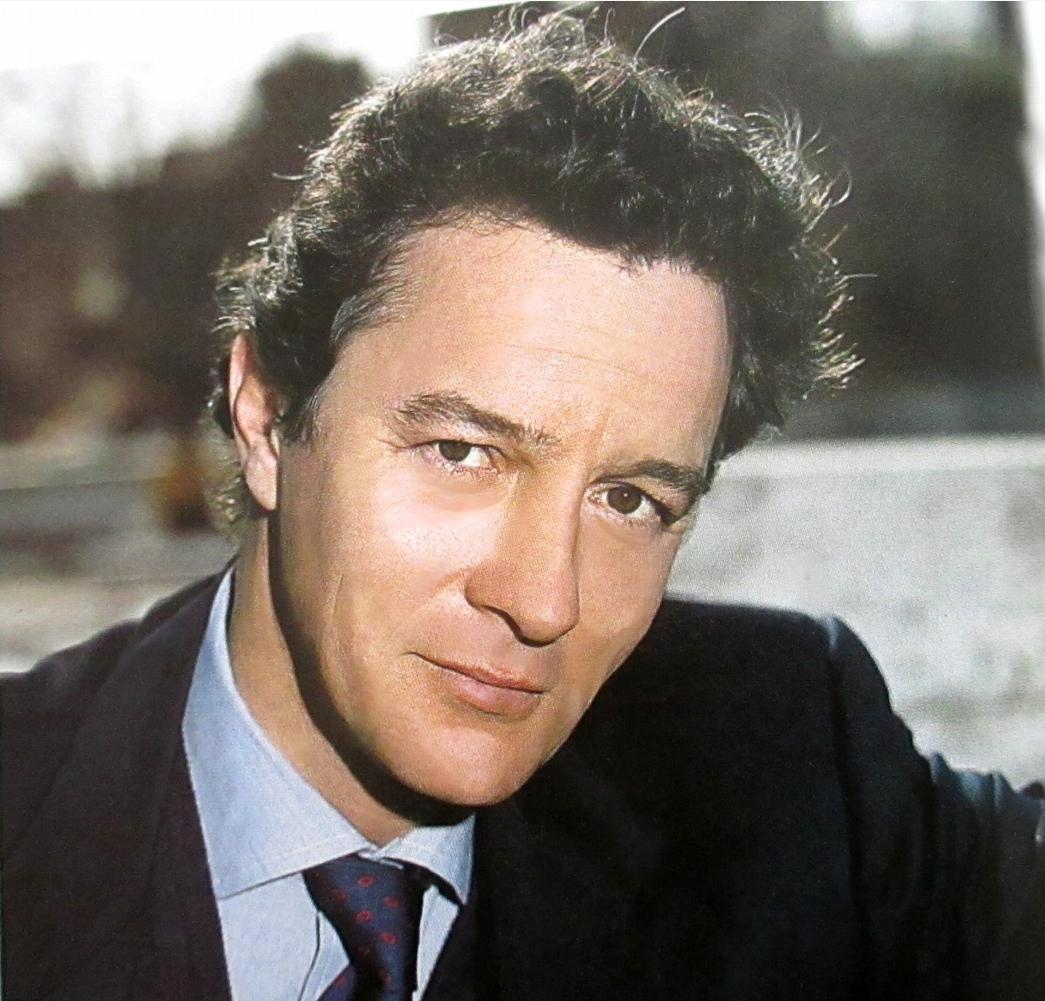
Vanni Corbellini

== Biography ==
Vanni Corbellini was born in Turin, Piedmont, Italy. He is the son of an engineer and a painter who came from Florence. He attended the Faculty of Economics and Business, he practiced competitive skiing and horse riding. He began performing as presenter in a show for disabled people. He became assistant director, after three years he moved to Rome. In 1987, he collaborated with Welsh director and painter Peter Greenaway on the movie The Belly of an Architect. In 1998, he's the protagonist of the drama TV series Incantesimo and he obtained great popularity. He speaks English, French and German and, in his free time, he enjoys swimming, cooking and relaxing in South Africa.

== Filmography ==
=== Film ===
- Paesaggio con figure (1983)
- Colpire al cuore (1983)
- Delirium (1987 film)
- The Belly of an Architect (1987)
- Drowning by Numbers (1988)
- Modì (1990)
- Isimeria (1991)
- La fine dell'intervista (1994)
- Film (2000)
- L'amore è eterno finché dura (2004)
- Statistica (2009)
- Santallegria (2009)
- Posti in piedi in Paradiso (2012)
- Time Raiders (2016)

=== Television ===
- Una questione privata (1982)
- L'Andreana (1982)
- Ugo Foscolo (1983)
- Valentino (1983)
- Caccia al ladro d'autore (1985)
- Paolo e Francesca (1985)
- Symphonie (1986)
- Il Giudice Istruttore (1987)
- Turno di notte (1987)
- Passioni (1989)
- Una verità come un'altra (1989)
- Disperatamente Giulia (1989)
- La Piovra 5 (1990)
- Vita dei castelli (1990)
- La storia spezzata (1990)
- La Ragnatela (1991)
- Un posto freddo in fondo al cuore (1992)
- Edera (1992)
- Schloß Hohenstein (1992)
- Tre passi nel delitto - Cherchez la femme (1993)
- La Ragnatela 2 (1993)
- Charlemagne, le prince à cheval (1993)
- Tre passi nel delitto - Villa Maltraversi (1993)
- Morte di una strega (1995)
- Incantesimo (1998)
- Der Kapitän (2000)
- Una donna per amico 3 (2001)
- Antonia - Zwischen Liebe und Macht (2001)
- Senza confini (2001)
- San Pietro (2005)
- Giovanni Paolo II (2005)
- La buona battaglia - Don Pietro Pappagallo (2006)
- La freccia nera (2006)
- Un posto al sole (2006)
- Eravamo solo Mille (2007)
- Zodiaco (2008)
- La Nuova Squadra (2009)
- Rossella (2011)
- I Cesaroni 5 (2012)

=== Director ===
- Fear of Drowning -short (1988)
