= Chloe Webb =

American actress (born 1956)

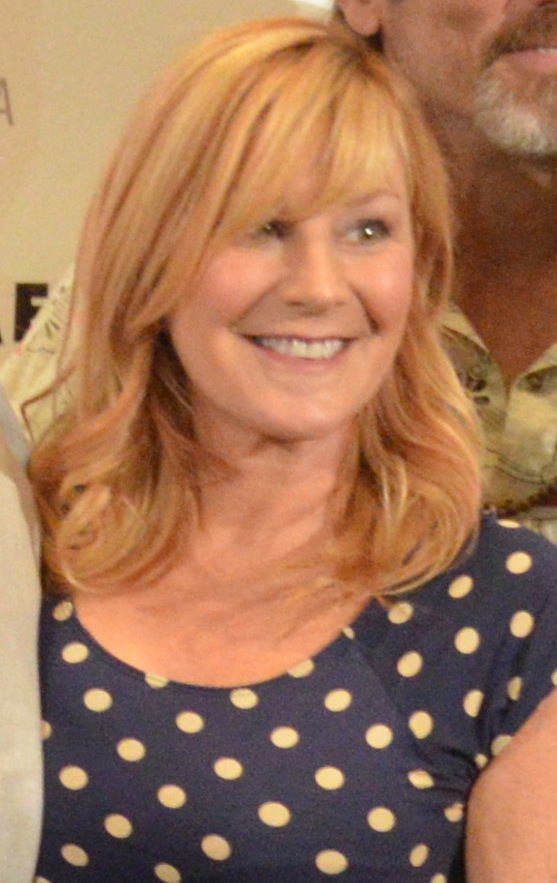
- Webb in 2013
- Born: June 25, 1956 (age 70); New York City, U.S.
- Education: The Boston Conservatory; Berklee College of Music
- Occupation: Actress
- Years active: 1983–present
- Notable work: The Belly of an Architect, China Beach, Sid and Nancy, Tales of the City, Twins, Shameless
- Spouse: J. Thomas Gelder (m. 1975)

Chloe Webb (born June 25, 1956) is an American actress, best known for her roles in the films Sid and Nancy (1986), The Belly of an Architect (1987), Twins (1988), and Heart Condition (1990). She also was nominated for a Primetime Emmy Award for her role as Laurette Barber in the ABC drama series China Beach, and had a recurring role as Monica Gallagher on the Showtime comedy-drama Shameless.

== Early life ==
Webb was born June 25, 1956, in the Greenwich Village neighborhood of Manhattan in New York City. She spent her youth in various locations on the East Coast, depending on where her father, a bridge and road designer, was employed, though she was primarily raised in Syracuse, New York, where she attended Bishop Grimes High School. At age sixteen, she enrolled at The Boston Conservatory and later, Berklee College of Music. Originally, she pursued her passion for singing by singing in bars despite being underaged; she realized that even though she greatly enjoyed singing, she was better at acting.

== Career ==
In April 1982, Webb joined Forbidden Broadway, an Off-Broadway revue parodying musical theatre, particularly Broadway musicals. Four years later, she made her film debut in Alex Cox's Sid & Nancy (1986); she portrayed Nancy Spungen, the mentally ill, heroin-addicted girlfriend of punk rock singer Sid Vicious. Her performance garnered best actress awards from the National Society of Film Critics, the Boston Film Critics and the San Francisco Film Critics.

She also appeared as Brian Dennehy's estranged socialite girlfriend in Peter Greenaway's 1987 drama film The Belly of an Architect and as Laurette, a young woman from Paoli, Pennsylvania who dreams of becoming a successful singer, in ABC's drama television series China Beach. Other roles include the eccentric girlfriend of Danny DeVito's character in the Ivan Reitman comedy Twins (1988), and a cameo as a woman convinced that she had been abducted by aliens in Ghostbusters II (1989). Between roles in motion pictures and television series, Webb frequently appeared in several Los Angeles based stage productions: The House of Blue Leaves, for which she won a Drama-Logue Award, and The Model Apartment; her performance earned her a Los Angeles Drama Critics Circle Award and another Drama-Logue Award.

Webb co-starred alongside Denzel Washington and Bob Hoskins in Heart Condition (1990). In 1991, she played a hairdresser in Queens Logic and a woman with a developmental disability who wins the lottery in ABC's made-for-TV film Lucky Day.

Other roles included the eccentric Mona Ramsey in the first season of Armistead Maupin miniseries Tales of the City (1993).

Webb has appeared on several television series: CBS's Judging Amy (2003), FOX's House (2005), CBS's Two and a Half Men (2005), NBC's Medium (2005), and CBS's CSI: Crime Scene Investigation (2008). Webb reunited with Cox in 2009 for his film Repo Chick; she played Sister Duncan.

In Showtime's comedy-drama TV series Shameless, Webb portrayed Monica Gallagher, the estranged and unstable wife of William H. Macy's character. The performance earned her a nomination for Critics' Choice Television Award for Best Guest Performer in a Drama Series.

== Partial filmography ==
Year	Title	Role	Notes
1983	Remington Steele	Secretary	Episode: "Steele Away with Me: Part 1"
1986	Mary	Actress	Episode: "Steppin' Out with Mary Brenner"
1986	Sid and Nancy	Nancy Spungen	National Society of Film Critics Award for Best Actress; Boston Society of Film Critics Award for Best Actress; Nominated—New York Film Critics Circle Award for Best Actress (3rd Place)
1987	The Belly of an Architect	Louisa Kracklite	
1988	China Beach	Laurette Barber	7 episodes Nominated—Primetime Emmy Award for Outstanding Guest Actress in a Drama Series (1989)
1988	Twins	Linda Mason	
1989	Ghostbusters II	Elaine	
1990	Heart Condition	Crystal Gerrity	
1991	Queens Logic	Patricia	
1991	Lucky Day	Allison	TV movie
1993	Twenty Bucks	Convenience Store Clerk	
1993	Silent Cries	Dinki Denk	
1993	Heart and Souls	Patient in Psychiatric Ward	
1993	A Dangerous Woman	Birdy	
1993	Armistead Maupin's Tales of the City	Mona Ramsey	TV miniseries
1994	Love Affair	Tina Wilson	
1997	She's So Lovely	Nancy Swearingen	
1998	The Newton Boys	Avis Glasscock	
1998	Practical Magic	Carla	
1999	Hey Arnold!	Candy Maldonado	Episode: "Dino Checks Out"
2001	The Ballad of Lucy Whipple	Sophie	TV movie
2003	Judging Amy	Mrs. Goodman	Episode: "Tricks of the Trade"
2005	House	Cora	Episode: "DNR"
2005	Two and a Half Men	Trudy	Episode: "That Old Hose Bag Is My Mother"
2005	Medium	Margaret Folsom	Episode: "Time Out of Mind"
2008	CSI: Crime Scene Investigation	Evelyn Polychronopolous	Episode: "The Theory of Everything"
2009	Repo Chick	Sister Duncan	
2011–2016	Shameless	Monica Gallagher	9 episodes Nominated—Critics' Choice Television Award for Best Guest Performer in a Drama Series (2012)
2019	Law & Order: Special Victims Unit	Rowan Mauer	Episode: S:20, E:17, "Missing"
