= The First King: Birth of an Empire =

2019 film directed by Matteo Rovere

- Italian theatrical release poster
- Directed by: Matteo Rovere
- Written by: Filippo Gravino; Francesca Manieri; Matteo Rovere
- Produced by: Andrea Paris; Matteo Rovere
- Starring: Alessandro Borghi; Alessio Lapice
- Cinematography: Daniele Ciprì
- Edited by: Gianni Vezzosi
- Music by: Andrea Farri
- Production companies: Groenlandia, Gapbusters, Rai Cinema
- Distributed by: 01 Distribution
- Release date: 31 January 2019
- Running time: 127 minutes
- Country: Italy
- Language: Old Latin

The First King: Birth of an Empire (Italian: Il primo re), released as Romulus v Remus: The First King in the UK, is a 2019 Italian historical drama film directed by Matteo Rovere. It stars Alessandro Borghi and Alessio Lapice.

Set in the 8th century BC, it is about the shepherd brothers Romulus and Remus and the founding of Rome. All dialogue is spoken in an early form of Latin. The movie had a budget of 7.5 million euros.

The film was theatrically released in Italy on 31 January 2019 by 01 Distribution.

== Plot ==
In Old Latium in 753 BC, a flash flood causes the two shepherd brothers Romulus and Remus to be stranded and captured as slaves in Alba Longa. They are able to rebel and free the other Latin and Sabine prisoners and take the Vesta priestess Satnei, as a hostage. Romulus steals the sacred fire but is stabbed in the side by an Alban soldier. In a conflict concerning the injured Romulus, Remus ends up killing the Latin leader and becomes the new leader of the tribe.

Rather than face the Alban Army, the group flees into a forest. The group face and defeat a warrior clan and Remus makes himself King over the surviving women, children, and old men of their pagus. During a sacrifice, Satnei predicts that one of the two brothers will become a great king and build an empire larger than what can be imagined, but to do so he will have to kill the other brother. The tribe assume that the prophecy means that Romulus will end up dead for the sake of his brother's greatness.

Remus refuses to accept a divine order that requires him to kill his brother. He extinguishes the sacred fire of Vesta, kills an old priest and leaves Satnei helpless in the middle of a forest. Returning to the pagus, Remus degrades all the inhabitants into slaves. Romulus regains his health and confronts Remus about his actions. Remus, regretful, goes to find Satnei, who while dying from having been attacked by wild animals tells him that sparing Romulus now means that it is Remus who will end up dead at the hands of Romulus.

Romulus is able to rekindle the sacred fire and becomes the new leader of the pagus. He appoints a young woman to watch over the fire so it remains lit, thereby establishing the first Vestal. Remus, trying to escape the prophecy, heads for the Tiber with a group of men, but is attacked by Alban cavalry and only saved by the tribe of Romulus. Remus then claims the tribe for himself, and after threatening to extinguish the sacred flame is confronted by his brother. Remus and Romulus fight and Romulus triumphs, mortally wounding Remus. On his deathbed he makes peace with his brother, recognizes him as his king, and tells him to establish a city on the other side of the river.

The tribe cross the Tiber and burn Remus' body on a pyre. Romulus swears to build the world's largest and most powerful city on his brother's ashes. He gives the city the name of Rome.

During the end credits, an animated map shows the expansion of the territory subject to Rome up to its peak under the emperor Trajan in 117.

== Themes ==
The film portrays a struggle between power and pietas, as represented by the two brothers. Ultimately, power is shown to become order only when submitted to the will of the gods. The director had no intention to comment on contemporary politics, but said that the myth's theme of love and hubris "talks to us through symbols that we can interpret in the light of our current time".

== Cast ==
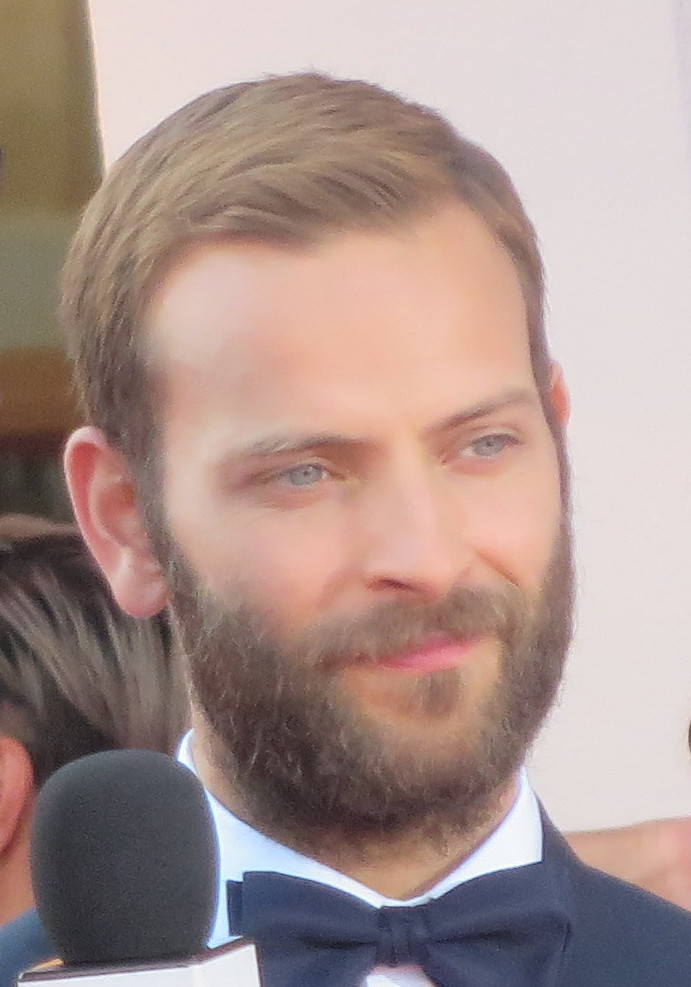
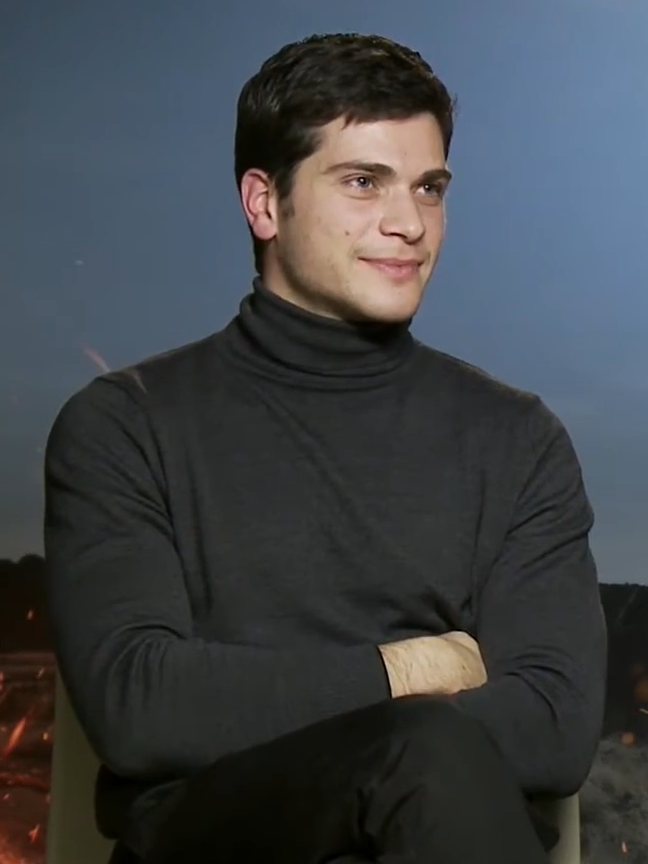
Alessandro Borghi and Alessio Lapice
- Alessandro Borghi as Remus
- Alessio Lapice as Romulus
- Fabrizio Rongione as Lars
- Massimiliano Rossi as Tefarie
- Tania Garribba as Satnei
- Lorenzo Gleijeses as Purtnass
- Vincenzo Crea as Elaxantre
- Max Malatesta as Veltur
- Fiorenzo Mattu as Mamercus
- Gabriel Montesi as Adieis
- Antonio Orlando as Erennis
- Vincenzo Pirrotta as Cai
- Michael Schermi as Aranth
- Ludovico Succio as Marce
- Martinus Tocchi as Lubces
- Marina Occhionero as Acca Larentia
- Nina Fotaras as Ramtha
- Emilio De Marchi as Testa di Lupo
- Luca Elmi as Maccus

== Production ==
The idea to make the film in archaic Latin came from a desire to make the characters sound ancestral, which would help the audience to attune themselves to the story. The language was created by a team from the University Guglielmo Marconi led by professor Luca Alfieri, with the aid of Francesco Pirozzi and Beatrice Grieco. The team studied archaic Latin and "fleshed it out" with help from the reconstructed Proto-Indo-European language.

Two visual influences were the films Valhalla Rising (2009) and Apocalypto (2006).

== Distribution ==
Originally set for a release at the end of 2018, the film was distributed in Italian cinemas by 01 Distribution beginning on 31 January 2019. The film had grossed 2.1 million euros after the first three weeks of screening.

It was released in North America on DVD and Blu-ray Disc by Well Go USA Entertainment on 24 September 2019, with both original audio and an English-dubbed version, while in the United Kingdom by Signature Entertainment on 13 January 2020.

== See also ==
- Duel of the Titans
- Romulus (TV series), Rovere's 2020-2022 TV series spoken in Old Latin.
- List of films based on Greco-Roman mythology
