= Canepazzo =

2012 film

- Directed by: David Petrucci
- Written by: Igor Maltagliati
- Produced by: David Petrucci
- Starring: Franco Nero; Tinto Brass; Vittoria Schisano; Myriam Catania; Franco Trevisi; Valentina Chico; Stefano Fresi
- Edited by: David Petrucci
- Music by: Piero Antolini
- Distributed by: Eagle Pictures
- Release date: 2012
- Running time: 83 minutes
- Country: Italy
- Language: Italian

Canepazzo is a 2012 Italian thriller film directed by David Petrucci. Described as a "low-budget" serial killer thriller, it stars Franco Nero, Tinto Brass, Vittoria Schisano, Myriam Catania and Valentina Chico. It was distributed in Italy by Eagle Pictures.

== Plot ==
Marco hires a criminologist to help him solve the mystery of the murder of his father, killed in the 1980s by the infamous serial killer Canepazzo ("Crazy Dog"). They come close to find out who the killer is, but as they do so "the line between truth and fiction starts to blur".

== Cast ==
- Franco Nero: Alvaro Genta
- Tinto Brass: The Doctor
- Vittoria Schisano: David Moiraghi
- Myriam Catania: Moira
- Franco Trevisi: Cosimo Genta
- Valentina Chico: Stefano Costa's Wife
- Stefano Fresi: Rebel Henchman
- Gian Marco Tavani: Marco Costa
- Marcella Braga: Junkey
- Marta Bifano: Ginevra
- David Petrucci: Renzo Travaglio
- Daniele Miglio: Teo Petralia
- Marco Bonetti: Raul Chinna
- Giorgia Sinicorni: Amina
- Fabrizio Bordignon: Scagnozzo
- Tony Allotta: Stefano Costa
- Andreea Togan: Widow
