= Alessandro Cremona =

Italian actor (born 1969)

- Born: 1969 (age 56–57); Busto Arsizio, Italy
- Occupation: Actor
- Years active: 1997–present

Alessandro Cremona (born 1969) is an Italian actor best known in English language cinema for his role of the henchman Marco Sciarra in the James Bond film, Spectre (2015).

== Biography ==
He was born in Busto Arsizio in the province of Varese. His family were originally from Piazza Armerina, in the province of Enna, in Sicily.

== Selected filmography ==
- Nirvana (1997), as a policeman
- 20 - Venti (2000)
- Malèna (2000)
- Miracle in Palermo! (2004), as the Boss
- I giorni dell'abbandono (2005)
- Taxi Lovers (2005)
- The Bodyguard's Cure (2006), as Spada
- Me and Marilyn (2009)
- L'affare Bonnard (2010), as Mustafà
- Reality (2012)
- Spectre (2015), as Marco Sciarra a Ernst Stavro Blofeld henchman
- Medici (2016), as Ferzetti
- Dolceroma (2019), as Fiore
- Angela and I (2021)
- Ferrari (2023)
