= Villa Amalia (novel) =

2006 novel by Pascal Quignard

Villa Amalia is a novel by the French author Pascal Quignard. It was first published in 2006 by Gallimard, and has appeared in their "folio" series as no. 4588. As of 2024, it has been translated into Russian and English.

== Plot ==
The middle-aged composer Ann Hidden has traced her partner of many years, Thomas, to the house where he is conducting an affair with a younger woman. At the scene she meets, for the first time since their adolescence, an old school friend from her childhood in Brittany, Georges Roehl. She takes the decision to end her former life, and in the space of a few months she leaves her part-time job as a music editor, ends her relationship with Thomas, visits her mother (from whom she is estranged) in Brittany but is not reconciled to her, sells the house in Paris that she has shared with Thomas, and asks Georges to create a place where she can live and compose in the grounds of his house near Sens in Burgundy, and leads him to believe that she will live there.

Georges is eager to re-establish a relationship with her, since he is mourning the death of his gay partner. However, once the sale of her Paris house has been finalised, she leaves without giving any indication of her destination, and after some travelling establishes herself on the Italian island of Ischia near Naples, eventually renting and renovating an old house on a headland. The house is called Villa Amalia and gives the book its name.

While on Ischia she begins an affair with a doctor called Leonhardt Radnitzky, who has recently divorced and has part-time custody of his four-year-old daughter Magdalena (Lena). She spends much of her time swimming in the sea, and on one occasion becomes exhausted and is rescued by a couple in a yacht, Charles and his much younger partner Juliette (also known as Giulia). They are on the point of splitting up, and eventually Ann and Giulia form a profound relationship and live together in the Villa Amalia, and Lena lives with them when Leonhardt's work means that he cannot look after her.

While Ann is out one day, and Giulia is asleep, Lena suffocates on a peanut. Giulia leaves and Ann's life disintegrates. Shortly afterwards, her mother dies; she returns to Brittany for the funeral, which is also attended by Thomas, by her father (a musician of Romanian Jewish origin, who left the family when she was a child) and by her school friend Véri, who has maintained contact between Ann and her mother. Ann refuses to be reconciled with Thomas, is rejected by her father, and quarrels with Véri. She returns to Burgundy and lives with Georges though they have no sexual relationship; at the end of the book he dies, with the implication that he has been suffering from AIDS though this is not stated.

== See also ==
- Villa Amalia (film)
