= Michelle Marquais =

French actress (1926–2022)

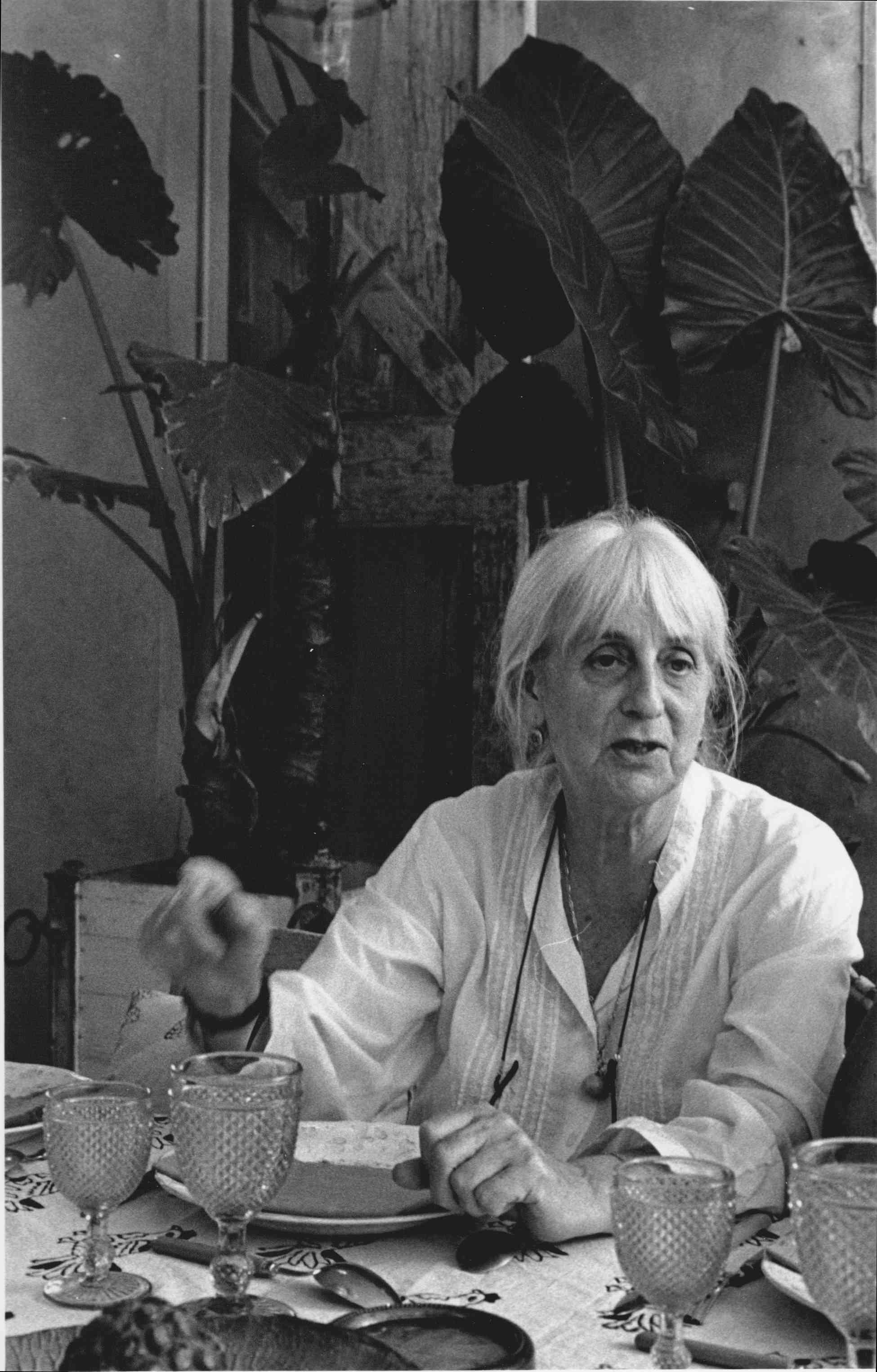
- Born: Michelle Pouvreau; 19 May 1926; Paris, France
- Died: 29 January 2022 (aged 95); Paris, France
- Education: CNSAD
- Occupation: Actress

Michelle Marquais (née Pouvreau; 19 May 1926 – 29 January 2022) was a French actress. She graduated from CNSAD in 1952 and became well known within theatre as well as film. She was married to painter Pierre Lesieur, with whom she had two daughters: Manuelle and Sarah. Marquais died in Paris on 29 January 2022, at the age of 95.

== Filmography ==
- The Taking of Power by Louis XIV (1966)
- Tom Thumb (1972)
- Le Pull-over rouge (1979)
- La Reine Margot (1994)
- Villa Amalia (2009)

== Awards ==
- Officer of the Order of the Arts and the Letters (1986)
