= Burning Secret =

- Theatrical release poster
- Directed by: Andrew Birkin
- Written by: Andrew Birkin; Stefan Zweig
- Produced by: Carol Lynn Greene
- Starring: Faye Dunaway; Klaus Maria Brandauer; Ian Richardson; David Eberts
- Cinematography: Ernest Day
- Edited by: Paul Green
- Music by: Hans Zimmer
- Distributed by: Vestron Pictures
- Release dates: 24 October 1988 (Chicago International Film Festival); 22 December 1988 (USA); 13 April 1989 (London)
- Running time: 106 minutes
- Countries: United Kingdom; West Germany
- Language: English
- Box office: 172,000 (Germany) £9,542 (UK)

Burning Secret is a 1988 drama film, based on the 1913 short story Brennendes Geheimnis by Stefan Zweig, about an American diplomat's son who befriends a mysterious baron while staying at an Austrian spa during the 1920s. This symbol-filled story, filmed with sensuous detail and nuance, is set in Austria in the 1920s. While being treated for asthma at a country spa, an American diplomat's lonely 12-year-old son is befriended and infatuated by a suave, mysterious baron. During a story of his war experiences, the baron reveals the scar of a wound from an American soldier and thrusts a pin through it, saying "see—no feeling." Little does the boy realize that it is his turn to be wounded. But soon his adored friend heartlessly brushes him aside and turns his seductive attentions to his mother. The boy's jealousy and feelings of betrayal become uncontrollable.

The film was written and directed by Andrew Birkin, and stars Klaus Maria Brandauer, Faye Dunaway, and David Eberts. The film won the Young Jury Prize at the Brussels Film Festival in 1989. Birkin was nominated for a Golden Lion award and David Eberts won the Special Jury Prize at the 45th Venice Film Festival.

== Production ==
According to Birkin, the making of the movie "was something of a nightmare" with the two lead actors thoroughly disliking one another and other problems while shooting on location in Mariánské Lázně, Czechoslovakia while directing young David Eberts was "a joy".

The film was composer Hans Zimmer's second feature film scoring.

== Release ==
The film opened the 24th Chicago International Film Festival on October 24, 1988.

The film had a Royal premiere in the United Kingdom on 12 April 1989 at the Cannon cinema on Shaftesbury Avenue in London attended by Diana, Princess of Wales. It opened the following day to the public at the cinema together with Cannon's cinema on Fulham Road.

Lions Gate Home Entertainment has yet to release the film onto DVD, although it is readily available for free on YouTube, as well as many of the original rushes, aka dailies.

== See also ==
- The Burning Secret (1923)
- The Burning Secret (1933)
