= Luna Park (miniseries) =

2021 Italian drama television miniseries

- Genre: Drama
- Created by: Isabella Aguilar
- Written by: Isabella Aguilar
- Directed by: Leonardo D'Agostini; Anna Negri
- Starring: Simona Tabasco; Lia Grieco; Alessio Lapice; Edoardo Coen; Guglielmo Poggi; Giulio Corso; Tommaso Ragno; Milvia Marigliano; Fabrizia Sacchi; Mario Sgueglia; Paolo Calabresi
- Composers: Michele Braga; Emanuele Bossi
- Country of origin: Italy
- Original language: Italian
- No. of episodes: 6

Production
- Executive producer: Ivan Fiorini
- Cinematography: Valerio Azzali
- Editors: Patrizio Marone; Ilaria Fraioli
- Running time: 44–54 minutes
- Production company: Fandango

Original release
- Network: Netflix
- Release: 30 September 2021

Luna Park is a 2021 Italian drama television miniseries created and written by Isabella Aguilar. It was released on Netflix on 30 September 2021.

== Premise ==
At an amusement park in Rome in 1962, fate brings together two young girls. Nora is a fortune teller who belongs to a circus family, and Rosa was born into a wealthy and well-to-do family. Although the girls come from two vastly different walks of life, they soon discover that their past is intertwined.

== Cast ==
- Simona Tabasco as Nora Marini
- Lia Grieco as Rosa Gabrielli
- Alessio Lapice as Simone Baldi
- Edoardo Coen as Matteo Baldi
- Guglielmo Poggi as Gigi Gabrielli
- Giulio Corso as Sandro Ralli
- Tommaso Ragno as Antonio Marini
- Milvia Marigliano as Miranda
- Fabrizia Sacchi as Lucia Gabrielli
- Mario Sgueglia as Ettore Marini
- Lorenza Indovina as Doriana Baldi
- Michele Bevilacqua as Lando Baldi
- Matteo Olivetti as Celeste Petrucci
- Ludovica Martino as Stella
- Lidia Vitale as Daria Dominici
- Gianfranco Gallo as Fausto Minnella
- Paolo Calabresi as Tullio Gabrielli

== Episodes ==
No.	Title	Duration	Original release date
1	"Butterfly" (Farfalla)	54 min	30 September 2021
2	"Mocambo"	50 min	30 September 2021
3	"Photographs" (Fotografie)	51 min	30 September 2021
4	"Stella"	44 min	30 September 2021
5	"Blow-up"	49 min	30 September 2021
6	"Flying" (Volare)	49 min	30 September 2021

== Production ==
Principal photography began in October 2020. The series was filmed in various areas around Rome, including Prati, Torvaianica, and Ostia.
