= Vittoria Schisano =

Italian actress (born 1977)

- Born: 11 November 1977 (age 48); Pomigliano d'Arco, Naples, Italy
- Other name: Giuseppe Schisano
- Occupation: Actress
- Years active: 2005–present

Vittoria Schisano (born 11 November 1977) is an Italian transgender actress and author.

== Biography ==
Schisano grew up in Pomigliano d'Arco in the Metropolitan City of Naples.

In 1998, she moved to Rome to study acting. After acting for several years in the theatre, she made her debut in 2005 in the television film My Son alongside Lando Buzzanca, Caterina Vertova and Giovanni Scifoni. In 2009, she received the award as Best New Actor (fiction and TV section) for the 2008/2009 season [not clear]; in 2010, she reinterpreted the role of Damien in the television series Me and my son - New stories for Commissioner Vivaldi. In the same year, she received the award as a revelation actor at the 40th Edition "Day of Europe" at the Capitol.

On 17 November 2011, during an interview published in the magazine Sette del Corriere della Sera, she declared that she had undertaken the path to correct her sex, at the end of which she took the name of Vittoria Schisano. She then continued her career as an actress, appearing in other films including Tutto tutto niente niente and Outing - Fidanzati per sbaglio.

In February 2016, she became the first woman who has made a gender transition to appear on the cover of the Italian edition of Playboy. On 6 May the same year she participated as godmother at the Ciao Darwin Awards.

== Filmography ==
=== Films ===
Year	Title	Role	Notes
1998	Rose e pistole	Sandra	
2012	Tutto tutto niente niente	Trans woman	Cameo appearance
2012	Canepazzo	David Moiraghi	
2013	Take Five	'A Jannona	
2014	La vita oscena	Prostitute	Cameo appearance
2014	Largo Baracche	Herself	Documentary film
2017	Nove lune e mezza	Secretary	
2019	Nati 2 volte	Marla	
2021	Raya and the Last Dragon	General Atitaya	Italian voice-over role

=== Television ===
Year	Title	Role	Notes
2005	Mio figlio	Damien	Television film
2010	Io e mio figlio - Nuove storie per il commissario Vivaldi	Damien	Main role; 6 episodes
2011	Al di là del lago	Vittoria	Episode: "Il ritorno di Valerio"
2017	Il bello delle donne… alcuni anni dopo	Irina	Episode: "Episode 4"
2018	The Bastards of Pizzofalcone	Mary	Episode: "Souvenir"
2019	Un posto al sole	Carla Parisi	Recurring role (season 24)
2020	Big Mouth	Natalie	Recurring role; 3 episodes
2024	The Life You Wanted	Gloria	Lead role; 6 episodes
