= Patrizia Pellegrino =

Italian actress, television personality, and singer

- Born: 28 July 1962 (age 64); Torre Annunziata, Naples, Italy
- Spouses: Pietro Antisari Vittori (m. 1989) Stefano Todini (m. 2005; div. 2013)
- Partner: Giampaolo Embrione
- Children: 4

Patrizia Pellegrino (born 28 July 1962) is an Italian actress, television personality and singer.

== Life and career ==
Born in Torre Annunziata, Pellegrino graduated in dance at the Teatro di San Carlo in Naples. She made her debut in a minor role in the 1977 film Onore e guapparia. The peak of her career was achieved in the first half of the 1980s, when she was active as lead actress in a number of comedy films as well as a showgirl and a presenter of several variety shows on television. In 1985 she starred in Greydon Clark's Final Justice, while in 1989 she starred as Rita in the Italian TV movie Dinner with a Vampire, alongside George Hilton. From the late 1980s she focused her career on stage, in both brilliant and dramatic works, working with Vittorio Gassman and Pietro Garinei, among others. In 1990 she had a role in Cristina Comencini's The Amusements of Private Life, alongside Gassman, and in 1996 she starred in the second season of Italian TV series Pazza famiglia. In 2001 she had a small role in the television movie With the Killer's Eyes, and in 2012 another minor role in Massimiliano Bruno's Viva l'Italia. In 2014 she portrayed Novella in Pupi Avati's Il bambino cattivo, a television film broadcast on Rai 1. In 2018 she starred in the thriller Le grida del silenzio.

Pellegrino also has a career as a singer, launched by the Italo disco single "Beng!!!". She participated in the second edition of the Rai 2 reality show L'isola dei famosi.

== Personal life ==
She has been married twice, and now she has a partner; she considers herself Roman Catholic.
