= The Life You Wanted =

2024 Italian drama television miniseries

- Netflix poster
- Italian: La vita che volevi
- Genre: Drama
- Written by: Ivan Cotroneo; Monica Rametta
- Directed by: Ivan Cotroneo
- Starring: Vittoria Schisano; Giuseppe Zeno; Pina Turco; Alessio Lapice; Nicola Bello
- Composer: Gabriele Roberto
- Country of origin: Italy
- Original language: Italian
- No. of episodes: 6

Production
- Producer: Massimo Del Frate
- Cinematography: Gian Filippo Corticelli
- Editor: Andrea Montanari
- Running time: 47–50 minutes
- Production company: Banijay Studios

Original release
- Network: Netflix
- Release: 29 May 2024

The Life You Wanted (Italian: La vita che volevi) is a 2024 Italian drama television miniseries starring Vittoria Schisano, Giuseppe Zeno, Pina Turco, Alessio Lapice, and Nicola Bello. It was released on Netflix on 29 May 2024.

== Premise ==
Gloria, a transgender woman, lives happily in Lecce, but her life is turned upside down with the arrival of Marina, her old friend from Naples. Gloria is reluctant to reconnect, as Marina reminds her of her pre-transition days, a time she would like to forget.

== Cast ==
- Vittoria Schisano as Gloria
- Giuseppe Zeno as Sergio
- Pina Turco as Marina
- Alessio Lapice as Pietro
- Nicola Bello as Andrea
- Francesca Pia Di Nola as Arianna
- Michele De Virgilio
- Bellarch as Eva
- Francesco Pellegrino
- Bianca Nappi
- Fabrizia Sacchi
- Antonio Monsellato

== Episodes ==
No.	Title	Duration	Original release date
1	"Episode 1"	48 min	29 May 2024
2	"Episode 2"	50 min	29 May 2024
3	"Episode 3"	47 min	29 May 2024
4	"Episode 4"	49 min	29 May 2024
5	"Episode 5"	47 min	29 May 2024
6	"Episode 6"	48 min	29 May 2024

== Production ==
Speaking about the series, series creator Ivan Cotroneo stated:

We wanted to write a story about a non-cisgender woman, a strong and independent woman, the story of a transgender woman. Often these characters are left on the margins, are collateral, or, in any case, marginalized.

The series was filmed in Lecce and Naples beginning in March 2023. After filming in and falling in love with Apulia, lead actress Vittoria Schisano bought a house in the region.

== Release ==
The series was released on Netflix on 29 May 2024.
