= Il bambino cattivo =

- Written by: Pupi Avati; Tommaso Avati; Claudio Piersanti
- Directed by: Pupi Avati
- Starring: Luigi Lo Cascio; Donatella Finocchiaro
- Music by: Stefano Arnaldi; Lucio Gregoretti
- Original language: Italian

Production
- Producer: Antonio Avati
- Cinematography: Blasco Giurato

Original release
- Network: Rai 1
- Release: 20 November 2013

Il bambino cattivo ("The naughty child") is a television film released in 2013, directed by Pupi Avati and produced by Rai Fiction. It was broadcast on November 20, 2013, on Rai 1 and Rai HD on the occasion of International Children's Day.

The film was made in collaboration with the Autorità Garante per l'Infanzia e l'Adolescenza.

== Plot ==
Brando is an 11-year-old boy whose family has just moved to Rome. His parents, both university professors, are estranged. Brando is exploited by both as they quarrel. His mother, Flora, has depression. Michele, his father, is immature and absent. The situation becomes more complicated when Michele begins dating Lilletta, a girl he has known for years. Brando is asked to be complicit (to accept and manage that betrayal), which makes him very uncomfortable. When Michele finally leaves the house, Flora attempts suicide and will never recover from her psychosis.

Abandoned by his parents, and with his paternal grandmother, incapacitated, Brando is given to a family house (an orphanage). Michele accepts the court's decision: his reasons being that he does not want his son entrusted to his maternal grandparents in Catania, who Michele feels will not provide proper care to the boy, and he also wants to assuage Lilletta, who has recently moved in with Michele, as she feels the same about the grandparents.

Brando falls into deep distress. He develops enuresis, making him a target for other children. Brando finds refuge in idolizing his heroes in Real Madrid and wrestling. One night he decides to visit his sick mother in the hospital. Hallucinating and presumably still wrongly believing that Brando endorses the relationship between his father and Lisetta, she refers to him as a "bad boy". She accuses him of theft in front of a nurse.

After about a year in the family home, Brando receives a proposal to go into foster care with the family of a man he knew while still at home. The couple had a son who had died recently, but the boy rejects them, fearing that he would be abandoned again.

After a few months, Michele visits Brando and reaffirms that he has no interest in him. Brando then agrees to the foster care proposal, stating that he did not want to become just a substitute for their dead son. Surrounded by the love that is in his new family, Brando becomes happy again.

== Cast ==
- Luigi Lo Cascio as Michele
- Donatella Finocchiaro as Flora
- Leonardo Della Bianca as Brando
- Erika Blanc as Giuditta
- Pino Quartullo as Stefano
- Isabella Aldovini as Laura
- Eleonora Sergio as Lilletta
- Augusto Zucchi as Vico
- Mia Benedetta as Marcella
- Patrizia Pellegrino as Novella
- Chiara Sani as Elide
- Rita Carlini as Suntina
- Marina Ninchi as Mina
- Diletta Dalla Casa as Ornella
- Bob Messini as Alioti, the lawyer
- Mariella Valentini as Bartocci

== TV Ratings ==
Airing	Viewers	Share
November 20, 2013	4,812,000	17,87%
