= Rossella (TV series) =

- Genre: Drama
- Created by: Sergio Silva
- Starring: Gabriella Pession; Danilo Brugia; Francesca Cavallin; Giuseppe Zeno; Toni Bertorelli; Monica Guerritore; Teresa Saponangelo; Giulio Forges Davanzati; Anna Melato; Ugo Dighero; Gabriele Bocciarelli; Lucia Lavia; Paolo Mazzarelli; Simone Montedoro
- Country of origin: Italy
- No. of seasons: 2
- No. of episodes: 12

Production
- Running time: 90 minutes

Original release
- Network: Rai 1
- Release: January 9, 2011 – November 26, 2013

Rossella is an Italian drama television series.

The story is set in Genoa late in the nineteenth century. The main character is a beautiful young girl named Rossella from a very wealthy family of high social class. In an accident she meets a journalist named Giuliano and falls in love with him at first sight. In spite of her father's attempt to prevent the marriage, Rossella, who has already been forced to marry Walter Jagaer, elopes with Giuliano in order to get married. It makes the father to reject the daughter with the thought that she has rejected him and because in the atmosphere of such family and society, this kind of act considered to be a great disgrace to the family.
