= Alessio Lapice =

Italian actor (born 1991)

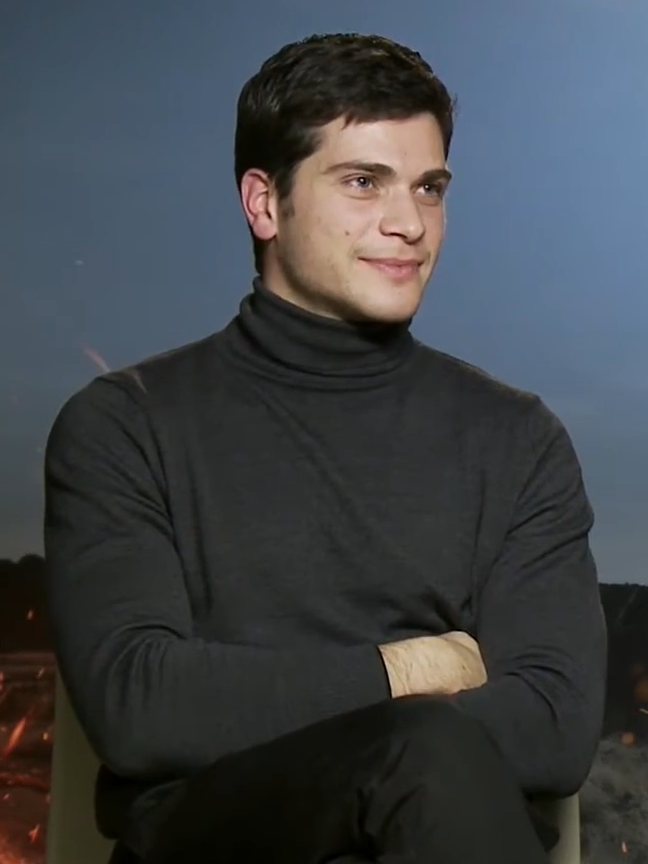
- Lapice in 2019
- Born: Alessio Maria Lapice; 12 August 1991 (age 34); Naples, Italy
- Occupation: Actor
- Years active: 2014–present

Alessio Maria Lapice (born 12 August 1991) is an Italian actor. He is best known for playing Romulus in the historical drama film The First King: Birth of an Empire (2019).

== Biography ==
Lapice grew up in Castellammare di Stabia. At the age of 17, he moved to Rome to pursue acting. He attended the Duse International workshop under Francesca De Sapio and various workshops at the Centro Sperimentale di Cinematografia. He plays the djembe.

== Filmography ==
=== Film ===
Year	Title	Role	Notes	Ref.
2017	There Is a Light: Il padre d'Italia	Fabio Mollo		
2017	Born in Casal Di Principe	Amedeo		
2018	Killer Mosquitos	Umberto		
2019	The First King: Birth of an Empire	Romulus		
2019	Rising Heartbeats	Bartolomeo	Short film	
2020	Io sto bene	Young Antonio		
2020	Weekend	Michele		
2022	Diabolik: Ginko Attacks!	Roller		
2023	Eravamo bambini	Gianluca		
2024	Peripheric Love	Salvatore		
2024	Un mexicano en la luna	Carlo		
TBA	Il protagonista			

=== Television ===
Year	Title	Role	Notes	Ref.
2014	Il peccato e la vergogna	Fabrizietto	7 episodes	
2015	L'onore e il rispetto	Vanni	3 episodes	
2015	Sotto copertura	Rudy	2 episodes	
2016	Fuoco amico TF45 - Eroe per amore	Francesco De Lucia	8 episodes	
2016	Gomorrah	Alfredo Natale	1 episode	
2016	Don Matteo	Francesco Canonico	1 episode	
2019–2025	Imma Tataranni: Deputy Prosecutor	Ippazio Calogiuri	21 episodes	
2020	Natale in casa Cupiello	Vittorio Elia	Television film	
2021	Luna Park	Simone Baldi	6 episodes	
2022	Diversi come due gocce d'acqua	Gaetano Fontana	Television film	
2024	The Life You Wanted	Pietro	6 episodes	
2024	Questi fantasmi!	Alfredo Marigliano	Television film	

=== Music videos ===
Year	Title	Artist	Role	Ref.
2018	"Contatto"	Negramaro	Himself	
2021	"La cura del tempo"	Negramaro	Himself	
