= 20 - Venti =

- 20th
- Directed by: Marco Pozzi
- Cinematography: Alessio Viola
- Music by: Claudio Pelissero
- Release date: 2000
- Running time: 91 minutes
- Country: Italy

20 - Venti (a.k.a. Twenty) is a 2000 Italian comedy-drama film directed by Marco Pozzi.

== Plot ==
The journey of a porn actress and a journalist, through twenty episodes, linked by the continued presence on the scene of cigarettes.

== Cast ==
- Anita Caprioli: Beatriz, pornstar
- Cecilia Dazzi: Eva, journalist
- Ivano Marescotti: Angelo di II classe
- Andrea Pezzi: Hit Boy
- Alessandro Cremona: Robber / Transvestite / Singer
- Sabrina Corabi: Angel
- Marco Salom: Ep7 American actor
- Mike Bongiorno: Himself
