= Breath of Life (1990 film) =

- Promotional poster
- Directed by: Beppe Cino
- Written by: Gesualdo Bufalino; Beppe Cino
- Produced by: Vincent Gallo; Franco Nero; Massimo Vigliar
- Starring: Franco Nero; Vanessa Redgrave; Fernando Rey
- Cinematography: Franco Delli Colli
- Edited by: Emanuele Foglietti
- Music by: Alberto Alessi; Carlo Siliotto
- Release date: 11 October 1990
- Running time: 96 minutes
- Country: Italy
- Languages: Italian; English

Breath of Life (Italian: Diceria dell'untore) is a 1990 Italian drama film directed by Beppe Cino. It is an adaptation of Gesualdo Bufalino's 1981 novel, Diceria dell'untore. The film, starring Franco Nero and Vanessa Redgrave was released in Italy on 11 October 1990.

== Plot ==
In 1946, Gesualdo (Nero) is a recovering Second World War soldier in a Palermo TB clinic. Most of the patients are young yet are aware of their impending death. Gesualdo holds the same bleak expectations. Yet miraculously he recovers while all the others perish, including the medical professionals. Gesualdo is the only survivor that can bear witness to the ordeal in the clinic.

== Cast ==
- Franco Nero as Gesualdo
- Vanessa Redgrave as Sister Crucifix
- Fernando Rey as Doctor
- Salvatore Cascio
- Tiberio Murgia
- Toni Ucci
- Lucrezia Lante della Rovere as Marta
- Remo Girone as Sebastiano
- Gianluca Favilla
- Dalila Di Lazzaro
- Ferdinando Murolo
