= Heart Condition (film) =

1990 film by James D. Parriott

- Theatrical release poster
- Directed by: James D. Parriott
- Written by: James D. Parriott
- Produced by: Steve Tisch
- Starring: Bob Hoskins; Denzel Washington; Chloe Webb
- Cinematography: Arthur Albert
- Edited by: David Finfer
- Music by: Patrick Leonard
- Distributed by: New Line Cinema
- Release date: February 2, 1990
- Running time: 100 minutes
- Country: United States
- Language: English
- Budget: $9–10 million
- Box office: $4,134,992 (US)

Heart Condition is a 1990 American comedy film written and directed by James D. Parriott and starring Bob Hoskins, Denzel Washington and Chloe Webb. Washington plays Napoleon Stone, a lawyer, and Hoskins plays Jack Moony, a racist police officer who hates Napoleon for dating his ex-girlfriend. The two compete in the same work force area in their community to help bring down the drug rate. Their goal would be to find the mysterious men that shot and killed Napoleon Stone.

The film was released by New Line Cinema on February 2, 1990, and grossed over $4 million in the United States. It received negative reviews from critics.

== Plot ==
Hoskins plays police sergeant Jack Moony, a racist bigoted cop; and Washington plays Napoleon Stone, an irresistible persuader and ambulance-chasing lawyer who Moony hates. The feelings are mutual. Stone goes on to date Moony's ex-girlfriend which stirs up the pot between the two. Moony's years of bad habits, such as overeating, smoking, and drinking, finally catch up with him, risking his health and life. At the same time, Stone is killed in an apparent car accident. After suffering a heart attack, Moony wakes up to find out that his new heart was once Stone's, and the dead lawyer's ghost has become his constant companion. Stone takes on the role of a manifested ghost that needs answers to why he was shot and who committed it. He seeks to haunt Moony to help him in this quest because of the relationship they once had that will now continue. Now, Moony will have to solve Stone's murder.

== Cast ==
- Bob Hoskins as LAPD Sgt. Jack Moony
- Denzel Washington as Napoleon Stone
- Lisa Stahl Sullivan as Annie
- Chloe Webb as Crystal Gerrity
- Roger E. Mosley as Captain Warren Wendt
- Alan Rachins as Dr. Greg Posner
- Ray Baker as Harry Zara
- Jeffrey Meek as Graham
- Eva LaRue as Peisha
- Ron Taylor as Bubba
- Clayton Landey as Posner's Assistant

== Production ==
Principal photography commenced in Los Angeles, California, on May 12, 1989, with a budget ranging from $9 to $10 million. Executive producer Robert Shaye, also President of New Line Cinema, asserted that had a major studio been involved, the cost for Heart Condition would have soared by "several million more." This was because New Line opted for non-union crews and eschewed high-profile stars to maintain budgetary discipline. However, the film faced setbacks as the local Teamsters Union staged protests during location shoots, causing delays.

Writer-director James D. Parriott said Denzel Washington insisted on tempering some of the racial elements before accepting the role of "Napoleon Stone." Initially conceived as "a flashy black pimp" by Parriott, the character struggled to attract prominent African-American actors. Gene Hackman, Robert Duvall, Brian Dennehy, and Dennis Hopper were considered to play "Jack Moony;" the part went to Bob Hoskins.

Key scenes were set at a hamburger stand erected on the southwest corner of Hollywood Boulevard and Argyle Street in Hollywood, California, opposite the Pantages Theater. Additional sequences were filmed two blocks north, near the intersection of Argyle and Franklin Avenue. While the exterior of the bowling alley scenes was shot at Hollywood Star Lanes on Santa Monica Boulevard, Hollywood, the interiors were filmed at Montrose Bowl in Montrose, California. Various other locations across Los Angeles, including Beverly Hills and Westwood, provided additional settings for filming.

The film's soundtrack includes the song "Have a Heart" by Bonnie Raitt from her album Nick of Time.

== Reception ==
The movie's reception was largely negative, scoring a 10% approval rating on Rotten Tomatoes based on 10 reviews. Roger Ebert gave the film two stars. In 2021, Vulture ranked 47 Denzel Washington movies, with Heart Condition coming in last place at number 47.
