= Taxi Lovers =

2005 film by Luigi Di Fiore

- Directed by: Luigi Di Fiore
- Written by: Dino Gentili, Filippo Gentili
- Produced by: Massimiliano Caroletti, Alberto Rossi
- Starring: Elisabetta Cavallotti; Edoardo Leo; Massimiliano Caroletti; Paolo Gasparini; Piero Leri; Alberto Di Stasio; Sergio Fiorentini; Giusy Valeri; Valentina Chico; Alessandro Cremona; Ettore Bassi; Alberto Rossi
- Music by: Massimo Filippini
- Release date: 22 April 2005
- Running time: 80 min
- Country: Italy
- Language: Italian

Taxi Lovers is a 2005 Italian thriller film directed by Luigi Di Fiore and produced by Massimiliano Caroletti and Alberto Rossi.

== Plot ==
Massimo, a taxi driver, meets Giovanna during a night ride: a relationship will be created between the two.

== Cast ==
- Paolo Gasparini: Marco
- Edoardo Leo: Massimo
- Massimiliano Caroletti: Carlo
- Elisabetta Cavallotti: Giovanna
- Sergio Fiorentini: Alberto
- Alberto Di Stasio: Anghelos
- Ettore Bassi: ispettore
- Valentina Chico: Linda
- Giusy Valeri: Maria
- Alessandro Cremona: Nurri
- Piero Leri: Luca Mari
- Alberto Rossi: barman

== Awards ==
- 2005 BAFF (B.A. Film Festival) - Casbot best producer
