= My Paper Dolls =

- Italian: Le mie ragazze di carta
- Directed by: Luca Lucini
- Written by: Luca Lucini; Mauro Spinelli; Ilaria Storti; Marta Storti
- Starring: Maya Sansa; Andrea Pennacchi; Alvise Marascalchi; Cristiano Caccamo; Raffaella Di Caprio; Alessandro Bressanello; Christian Mancin; Marta Guerrini; Giuseppe Zeno; Neri Marcorè
- Cinematography: Luan Amelio Ujkaj
- Edited by: Carlotta Cristiani; Matteo Mossi
- Music by: Nicola Piovani
- Release date: 13 July 2023
- Running time: 101 minutes
- Country: Italy
- Language: Italian

My Paper Dolls (Italian: Le mie ragazze di carta) is a 2023 Italian comedy film directed by Luca Lucini.

The film was released in Italy on 13 July 2023. It was shot in the province of Treviso.

== Cast ==
- Maya Sansa as Anna
- Andrea Pennacchi as Primo
- Alvise Marascalchi as Tiberio
- Cristiano Caccamo as Claudio
- Raffaella Di Caprio as Milly d'Italia
- Alessandro Bressanello as Alcide
- Christian Mancin as Giacomo
- Marta Guerrini as Marika
- Giuseppe Zeno as Bastiano
- Neri Marcorè as Don Marcello
