= Mario and the Magician (film) =

1994 film

- Film poster
- Directed by: Klaus Maria Brandauer
- Written by: Thomas Mann; Burt Weinshanker
- Starring: Julian Sands
- Cinematography: Lajos Koltai
- Release date: 15 December 1994
- Running time: 127 minutes
- Countries: Germany; France; Austria
- Language: German

Mario and the Magician (German: Mario und der Zauberer) is a 1994 German-language drama film directed by Klaus Maria Brandauer, based on the 1929 novella of the same name by Thomas Mann. It was entered into the 19th Moscow International Film Festival where Lajos Koltai won the Special Silver St. George for the Director of Photography.

== Cast ==
- Julian Sands as Professor Fuhrmann
- Anna Galiena as Rachel Fuhrmann
- Jan Wachtel as Stephan Fuhrmann
- Nina Schweser as Sophie Fuhrmann
- Klaus Maria Brandauer as Cipolla
- Pavel Greco as Mario
- Valentina Chico as Silvestra
- Elisabeth Trissenaar as Sofronia Angiolieri
- Rolf Hoppe as Prefecto Angiolieri
- Philippe Leroy as Graziano (as Philippe Leroy Beaulieu)
- Ivano Marescotti as Pastore
