= Maria Venturi =

Italian writer (1933–2024)

- Born: 1 August 1933; Venice, Italy
- Died: 21 February 2024 (aged 90); Brescia, Italy
- Occupations: Author; journalist; screenwriter

Maria Venturi (1 August 1933 – 21 February 2024) was an Italian writer, journalist, and screenwriter.

== Life and career ==
Born on 1 August 1933 in Venice, at 7 years old Venturi moved to Lombardy and studied letters at the University of Milan. She started her professional career in 1970, collaborating with Novella as author of short stories and as journalist. She served as editor of several magazines, notably Novella 2000 and Annabella.

In 1984, Venturi released her first novel, Una storia d’amore ("A love story"), which was a best-seller spanning numerous reprints and was adapted into a television miniseries directed by Duccio Tessari and starring Margherita Buy. She later wrote almost 30 novels, of which three were also adapted into television films. Starting from Incantesimo, she also collaborated with RAI as screenwriter of several series, including Orgoglio and Butta la luna. Her last work was the novel Cuore matto. I mantra per una relazione felice ("Crazy heart. The mantras for a happy relationship"), released in 2019. Venturi died on 21 February 2024, at the age of 90.
