= Amanda Sandrelli =

Italian actress (born 1964)

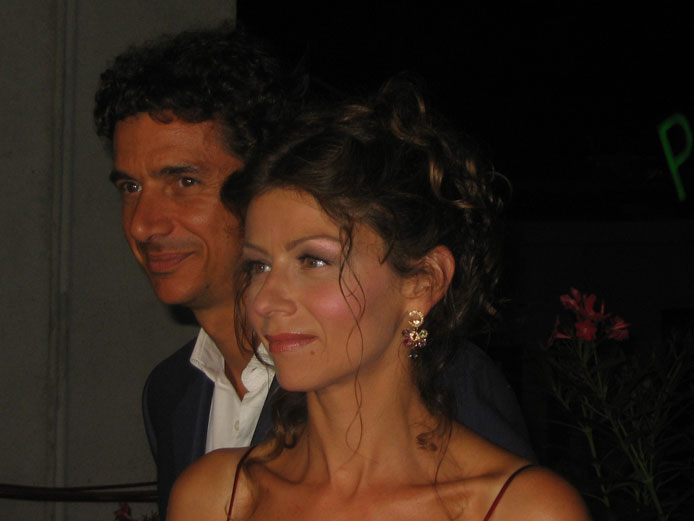
- Born: Amanda Paoli; 31 October 1964 (age 61); Lausanne, Switzerland
- Occupation: Actress
- Years active: 1984–2010
- Spouse: Blas Roca-Rey (m. 1994; div. 2013)
- Children: 2
- Parents: Gino Paoli (father); Stefania Sandrelli (mother)

Amanda Sandrelli (born Amanda Paoli, 31 October 1964) is an Italian actress.

Born in Lausanne, she is the daughter of Italian singer Gino Paoli and actress Stefania Sandrelli. She debuted in Non ci resta che piangere, by Roberto Benigni and Massimo Troisi, in 1984.

== Filmography ==
- Non ci resta che piangere (1984)
- L'attenzione (1984)
- La Casa del Buon Ritorno (1986)
- Strana la vita (1987)
- Saremo felici (1988)
- Da domani (1988)
- Amori in corso (1989)
- Chiodo a tradimento (1990)
- A Violent Life (1990)
- Sedem jednou ranou (The Brave Little Tailor) (1990)
- Il ricatto 2 (1991)
- Donne sottotetto (1992)
- Cinecittà... Cinecittà (1992)
- Stefano Quantestorie (1993)
- 80 metriquadri (1993)
- Olimpo Lupo (1995)
- Bruno aspetta in macchina (1996)
- Ci vediamo in tribunale (1996)
- Nirvana (1997)
- Five Stormy Days (1997)
- Oscar per due (1998)
- Madri (1999)
- Perlasca – Un eroe Italiano (2002)
- Il giudice Mastrangelo (2005)
- Io e mamma (2007)
- Christine Cristina (2009)

== Theatre ==
- Buona notte ai sognatori (1985–1986)
- Né in cielo, né in terra (1992)
- Bruciati (1993)
- Cinque (1994)
- La Chunga (1994)
- Gianni Ginetta e gli altri (1995)
