= The Punisher (2004 score) =

Film score by Carlo Siliotto
- Released: June 15, 2004
- Genres: Orchestral; Film score
- Length: 67:41
- Label: La-La Land
- Producers: Michael Gerhard; Carlo Siliotto

Carlo Siliotto chronology
Julius Caesar (miniseries) (2003)	The Punisher (2004)	Nomad (2005 film) (2005)

Professional ratings
Review scores
Source	Rating
Filmtracks	4/5 stars
Film Score Monthly	4/5 stars

The Punisher or Original Score from the Motion Picture The Punisher is the official score for the film The Punisher and was released in 2004. It was entirely composed by Carlo Siliotto. The score has an Italian and western influence and theme.

== Track list ==
All tracks are written by Carlo Siliotto.

Track listing
No.	Title	Length
1.	"The Punisher"	0:56
2.	"Otto Krieg"	3:14
3.	"Unusual Resurrection"	1:40
4.	"Moving"	3:09
5.	"I Can't Believe I'm Home"	1:23
6.	"His Whole Family"	1:27
7.	"The Massacre"	5:45
8.	"Death and Resurrection of Frank Castle"	1:47
9.	"God's Gonna Sit This One Out"	3:57
10.	"Ice Lolly and Meat"	1:28
11.	"You're Gonna Help Me"	1:24
12.	"Entering the Fort"	1:58
13.	"About Your Family / Setting a Trap"	3:11
14.	"A Bomb for John Saint"	1:08
15.	"Good Memories Can Save Your Life"	1:13
16.	"The Thugs"	1:30
17.	"The Torture"	3:12
18.	"Elevator and Headache"	1:07
19.	"A New Family / Joan's Suffering"	3:34
20.	"Quentin's Glass Home"	1:32
21.	"Killing a Best Friend"	1:43
22.	"You Don't Understand... End of a Dark Lady"	2:34
23.	"She Took the Train / Punishment"	1:47
24.	"The Arrow"	1:48
25.	"Both of Them"	1:32
26.	"The Skull"	2:34
27.	"Castle's Loneliness"	1:35
28.	"Call Me 'The Punisher'"	2:23
29.	"Jealous One" (Performed by J.C. Loader)	3:52
30.	"La donna è mobile" (Performed by Peter Dvorský)	2:06
Total length:		67:41

== Production ==
The score was composed and conducted by composer Carlo Siliotto, who is Italian like most of the characters, including the main character Frank Castle. Wishing the music to be especially emotive, and being made aware of Siliotto's previous work, such as on the film Flight of the Innocent and the miniseries Julius Caesar by Siliottos agent, Tammy Krutchkoff trought Marvels music supervisor, Dave Jordan, director Jonathan Hensleigh approached them, saying that he wanted Siliotto for the job. When working on the film he viewed Frank Castle as a tragic character and stated:

This man, Frank Castle, is somebody who has a slaughtered family. He comes through that slaughter, and becomes a punisher. But he's a sad man - he drinks, and has bad memories always coming to him. There's a lot in the film, and at times it is like a modern version of a classic tragedy - like Othello.

Originally Siliotto thought that it was unusual for an action movie director to want to use an Italian musician for his project and stated that the entire work process was stress free due to Hensleigh being a fan of his work.

Before the film's release, two tracks were already available at the film's website.

== Reception ==
Mike Blanchard of Geekcastradio gave the score mixed review, stating that the music did not immediately grip him but that the main theme is very strong.

Track 1: "The Punisher" is only 0:59 in length, but it gives you the main crux of Frank's character, and a really cool overall theme. This theme can be placed up there with many of the current superheroes themes in the Marvel Cinematic Universe in my opinion. For a anti-hero like The Punisher, I love how Carlo Siliotto has made a main theme that is darkly heroic.

Mark Wallance of Film Score Monthly praised the score highly and expressed that it was the first time in a long time that he had seen a film that was worth watching just for the music. He added that he hoped that the films would inspire other films to put more effort into the score. Wallance also commended Siliotto for composing it in its entirety by himself.

The score for The Punisher wasn't the usual paint by numbers that I've come to expect from such films. From the main titles through the violin solo that makes an unexpected appearance half way through the film, to name just a few moments that have stuck with me, it seems to me that a lot of thought went into the score.
