= The Belly of an Architect =

- Film poster
- Directed by: Peter Greenaway
- Written by: Peter Greenaway
- Produced by: Colin Callender; Walter Donohue
- Starring: Brian Dennehy; Chloe Webb; Lambert Wilson
- Cinematography: Sacha Vierny
- Edited by: John Wilson
- Music by: Wim Mertens
- Distributed by: Recorded Releasing
- Release date: October 16, 1987 (United Kingdom)
- Running time: 118 minutes
- Countries: United Kingdom; Italy
- Language: English
- Budget: £1.8 million

The Belly of an Architect is a 1987 drama film written and directed by Peter Greenaway, featuring original music by Glenn Branca and Wim Mertens. Starring Brian Dennehy and Chloe Webb, it was nominated for the Palme d'Or (Golden Palm) award at the 1987 Cannes Film Festival.

== Plot ==
Stourley Kracklite, a renowned Chicago architect, has been commissioned to construct a major exhibition in Rome's Altare della Patria dedicated to the architecture of his idol, Étienne-Louis Boullée, who until the 20th century remained little known. Kracklite's Italian colleagues express doubts about whether Boullée really belongs in the architectural pantheon; they note that few of his buildings were ever constructed and observe that Boullée was an inspiration for fascist and Nazi architects.

As he works on the exhibition, Kracklite's marriage and health deteriorate. He becomes obsessed with Caesar Augustus, the first emperor of the Roman Empire, after hearing that Augustus's wife, Livia, supposedly poisoned him. Suffering from recurrent stomach pains, he suspects his much younger wife, Louisa, of trying to do the same. Louisa reveals that she is pregnant with Kracklite's child, conceived at the precise moment their train crossed the Italian border. Meanwhile, she has become sexually involved with Caspasian Speckler, the younger co-organiser of the exhibition. Caspasian has been siphoning off funds from the exhibition, even as he and his Italian associates undermine Kracklite's authority and confidence. Kracklite himself is seduced by Caspasian's sister Flavia, a photographer in her apartment across from the Palazzo della Civiltà Italiana. The two are discovered in flagrante by Caspasian, who threatens to tell Louisa.

Louisa leaves Kracklite, who is diagnosed with stomach cancer and given only months to live. Effectively sidelined from the exhibition, he becomes fatalistic and drinks heavily. The film ends at the exhibition's opening ceremony, nine months after the Kracklites' arrival in Italy. Kracklite, now replaced as director by Caspasian, watches from a high vantage point as Louisa cuts the tape. As she suddenly goes into labor, Kracklite, unseen by the guests, jumps to his death.

== Cast ==
- Brian Dennehy as Stourley Kracklite
- Chloe Webb as Louisa Kracklite
- Lambert Wilson as Caspasian Speckler
- Sergio Fantoni as Io Speckler
- Stefania Casini as Flavia Speckler
- Vanni Corbellini as Frederico
- Alfredo Varelli as Julio
- Geoffrey Copleston as Caspetti
- Francesco Carnelutti as Pastarri
- Marino Masé as Trettorio
- Marne Maitland as Battistino
- Claudio Spadaro as Mori
- Rate Furlan as The Violinist
- Julian Jenkins as Old Doctor
- Enrica Maria Scrivano as Mother

== Critical reception ==
Review aggregator website Rotten Tomatoes reports 85% approval of The Belly of an Architect based on 13 reviews, with an average rating of 6.6/10.
