= Maya Sansa =

Italian actress

- Born: 25 September 1975 (age 50); Rome, Italy
- Occupation: Actress

Maya Sansa (born 25 September 1975) is an Italian actress.

== Early life and career ==
Maya Sansa was born in Rome, the daughter of an Iranian father and an Italian mother. When she was 14, she started to study acting at her high school in Rome the "Virgilio". She then moved to London to study at the Guildhall School of Music and Drama. There she graduated in acting and was soon picked by Marco Bellocchio to take part in his new film: La balia. Maya later worked with Bellocchio for a second time, starring in the film Goodmorning, Night. Sansa has also worked with Marco Tullio Giordana in the film The Best of Youth.

On 2 May 2004 The New York Times published an article which named her as the new image of Italian cinema.

On 14 June 2013, she won the David di Donatello for Best Supporting Actress for her role in Dormant Beauty.

== Personal life ==
She has a daughter, Talitha, with her partner Fabrice Scott with whom she lives in Paris.

== Filmography ==
- La balia (1999)
- Lupo mannaro (2000)
- Nella terra di nessuno (2001)
- Gasoline (2001)
- La vita degli altri (2001)
- The Best of Youth (2003)
- Il vestito da sposa (2003)
- Good Morning, Night (2003)
- Stessa rabbia, stessa primavera (2003)
- My father’s garden (2003)
- A Levante... (2004)
- L'amore ritrovato (2004)
- ControNatura (2005)
- In ascolto (The Listening, 2005)
- Jamal (2006, short)
- Sartre, l'âge des passions (2006)
- The Listening (2006)
- Il prossimo tuo (2007)
- Fuori dalle corde (2007)
- Einstein (2008)
- Les Femmes de l'ombre (2008)
- Villa Amalia (2009)
- David Copperfield (2009)
- The Man Who Will Come (2010)
- Un altro mondo (2010)
- La pecora nera (2010)
- Voyez comme ils dansent (2011)
- The First Man (2011)
- Dormant Beauty (2012)
- Cycling With Moliere (Alceste à bicyclette, 2013)
- La Belle Vie (2013)
- Collateral (2018)
- Sisters in Arms (2019)
- The Truth (2019)
- Security (2021)
- Irma Vep (2022, TV)
- Paris Memories (Revoir Paris, 2022)
- My Paper Dolls (2023)
- The Iris Affair (2025)
