= Susanna Tamaro =

Italian novelist (born 1957)

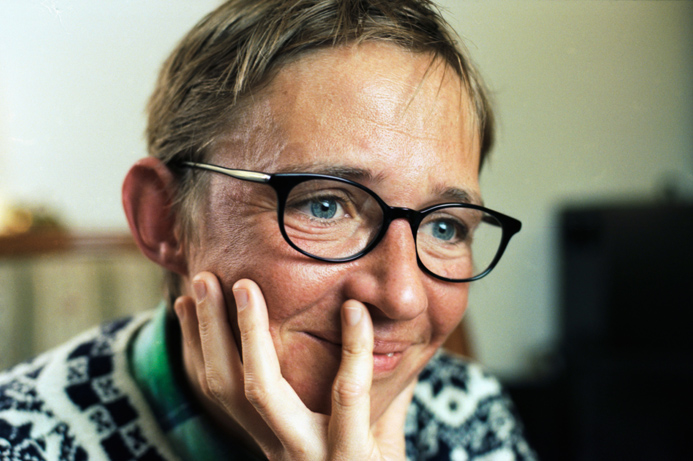
- Tamaro in 1995
- Born: 12 December 1957 (age 68); Trieste, Italy
- Occupations: Novelist, film director
- Known for: Follow Your Heart (1994)
- Website: susannatamaro.it

Susanna Tamaro (Italian pronunciation: [suˈzanna taˈmaːro]; born 12 December 1957) is an Italian novelist and film director. She is an author of novels, stories, magazine articles, and children's literature. Her novel Va' dove ti porta il cuore (Follow Your Heart) was a worldwide bestseller, translated into 44 languages and awarded with the 1994 Premio Donna Città di Roma.

== Early life and education ==
Susanna Tamaro was born in Trieste in 1957 to a family of Jewish origins on her mother's side; she is a distant relative of the Italian writer Italo Svevo. She has described her father as an alcoholic and her mother as "cold and cruel". After her parents separated, she was raised in Trieste by her maternal grandmother and then by a care home.

She received a scholarship to study at the Centro Sperimentale di Cinematografia, an Italian school of cinema located in Rome, where she obtained a diploma in direction in 1977, beginning to work with director Salvatore Samperi. She worked as a writer and editor in the television industry for several years.

== Writing career ==
In 1978, she started writing her first short stories. Her first novel Illmitz was completed in 1981 but rejected by all the publishing houses she approached. It was eventually published in 2013.

In 1989, her novel La testa fra le nuvole (Head in the Clouds) was published by Marsilio. Her second novel Per voce sola (Solo Voice, 1991) won the International PEN prize and was translated into several languages. Federico Fellini said of her second novel, "It has given me the joy of being moved without embarrassing me, as it happened to me when I read Oliver Twist or certain pages of Amerika, by Kafka." In 1991, she wrote a book for children Cuore di ciccia.

Her 1993 novel Va' dove ti porta il cuore (Follow Your Heart) did not receive favorable reception from critics when it was first published, but it became a bestseller and sold 15 million copies by 2008. It is described as the "Italian book most sold in the 20th century"; as of 2008, about 25,000 copies had sold in the United States. The novel won the Premio Donna Citta di Roma award in 1994. By 2002, it was translated into 44 languages. In 1996, the Italian director, Cristina Comencini, made a film of the same name based on the novel.

In 1997, she published the novel Anima Mundi, and was widely criticized for her portrayal of Father Walter in what she described as "a shameful campaign" of "insults, threats and slander". In 1998, she published Dear Matildha – I Can't Wait for Man to Walk, a collection of articles she wrote for Famiglia Cristiana, an Italian magazine.

Her book Rispondimi (Answer Me) was described by Kirkus Reviews as "Holy abstractions brightened by dollops of sex and violence." The book consists of three stories, featuring the daughter of a prostitute, the wife of a businessman, and a jealous husband. A review by World Literature Today states, "The book's title comes from the closing passage of the first story, when Rosa, alone in the world, asks a stray white dog (a white dog appears in each story) if Someone guides us or if we are alone in the world. When the dog just looks at her with its tongue hanging out, she tells it to speak, to answer her: 'Rispondimi'." A review in Library Journal refers to the protagonists in each story and concludes, "Their bitterness at the world and inability to love or be loved is so off-putting that the reader is likely to stop caring long before they reach their moments of truth. Not recommended." A review by Publishers Weekly states, "If Tamaro's view is dark, the care she takes with character development infuses her narratives with a clear and resonant moral vision."

In 2001, she wrote Raccontami. In 2002, she wrote Più fuoco, più vento; in 2003 Fuori. In 2005, she directed the film Nel mio amore, based on a story from Answer Me, titled "Hell Does Not Exist". In 2006, she published Ascolta la mia voce (Listen to My Voice), a sequel of Follow your Heart. This novel was translated in twelve languages. In 2008, she published Luisito – A Love Story.

In September 2018, she announced the release of her next book, anticipating that in it she would discuss how she was affected by Asperger syndrome since the early years of life.

== Documentary ==
In 2021, a documentary about Tamaro titled Inedita was shown at the Rome Film Festival and then on television in Italy on channel Rai 5. In the documentary, she discusses her life with Asperger syndrome, her writing career, and her various interests, including bicycle repair, beekeeping, and the practice of martial arts.

== Awards and honors ==
- Italo Calvino Prize for La testa fra le nuvole (1989)
- Elsa Morante Prize for La testa fra le nuvole (1990)
- International PEN for Per voce sola (1991)
- Rapallo Carige Prize for women writers for Per voce sola (1992)
- Cento Prize for Il cerchio magico (1995)
- Honorary Golden Dante of A.L. "Bocconi d'Inchiostro" – Bocconi University for her outstanding career (2013)
- Donna Città di Roma for Va' dove ti porta il cuore (1994)
- Strega Prize for Salta Bart! (2016)

== Works ==
- La testa tra le nuvole (1989)
- Per voce sola (1991)
  - For Solo Voice ISBN 9781446466506
- Cuore di ciccia (1992) ISBN 9788809874510
- Il cerchio magico (1994)
- Va' dove ti porta il cuore (1994) 2018 2nd edition - ISBN 9788845294747
  - Follow your Heart (1994) ISBN 9780385316576
- Anima Mundi (1997)
  - Anima Mundi (English) (2007) ISBN 9780975444443
- Cara Mathilda. Lettere a un'amica (1997)
- Tobia e l'angelo (1998)
- Verso casa (1999)
- Papirofobia (2000)
- Rispondimi (2001) Rizzoli ISBN 88-17-86726-8
  - Answer Me (2007) ISBN 9780307424846
- Più fuoco più vento (2002)
- Fuori (2003)
- Ogni parola è un seme (2005)
- Ascolta la mia voce (2007)
  - Listen to My Voice (2008) ISBN 9781846550645
- Luisito – Una storia d'amore (2008)
- Il grande albero (2009)
  - El gran árbol tr. by Guadalupe Ramírez Muñoz, (2010) ISBN 978-84-96886-19-3
- Per sempre (2011)
- L'isola che c'è. Il nostro tempo, l'Italia, i nostri figli (2011)
- Ogni angelo è tremendo (2013)
- Via Crucis. Meditazioni e preghiere (2013) (E-book)
- Un'infanzia: adattamento teatrale di Adriano Evangelisti (2013) (E-book)
- Sulle orme di San Francesco (2014) (E-book)
- Illmitz (2014)
- Salta Bart! (2014)
- Un cuore pensante (2015)
- The Tiger and the Acrobat (2017) ISBN 9781786072825
- Il tuo sguardo illumina il mondo (2018)

== Filmography ==
- Nel mio amore (2004)

== Personal life ==
Tamaro described herself as a "strange child", being treated by neurologists and taking medications from an early age; later in her childhood she read about Asperger syndrome and was finally diagnosed with the disorder. She claims to have experienced gender dysphoria since the age of 3.

In a 2002 interview, Tamaro called herself an environmentalist, a vegetarian, and "a Christian more than a Catholic" due to the religious beliefs of her family, including her father's interest in Taoism and her mother's Jewish heritage. As of 2024, she has lived near Orvieto with the writer Roberta Mazzoni for 35 years; she has referred to the relationship as a "spiritual friendship", stating that she is not a lesbian.

Tamaro has expressed her opposition to abortion.
