= Incantesimo =

Television series

- Genre: Medical drama; Soap opera
- Created by: Maria Venturi
- Country of origin: Italy
- Original language: Italian
- No. of seasons: 10
- No. of episodes: 588

Original release
- Network: Rai 2 Rai 1
- Release: June 8, 1998 – July 4, 2008

Incantesimo (English: Enchantment) is a long-running Italian television drama series, originally broadcast on the RAI network from 1998 to 2008. It is mainly set in a hospital called Clinica Life in Rome, Italy, and revolves around the lives of its staff. It is known for having different lead actors who play a different story in almost every of its ten seasons.

In 2001, scriptwriter Maria Venturi published her first "television novel" called Incantesimo aimed at viewers who were unable to keep up with the soap opera on a daily basis.

== Production and release ==
Incantesimo originally premiered in June 1998, on the Italian Rai 2 channel as an alternative prime time programming to the 1998 FIFA World Cup, which was being broadcast live at the time on Rai 1. The plot is written by popular Italian writer Maria Venturi. Gianni Lepre directed the series. The main characters are played by Agnese Nano, Vanni Corbellini and Giovanni Guidelli. The actress Daniela Poggi, who plays the malicious Cristina Ansaldi – one of the most notable characters – was personally called by Gianni Lepre to join the cast as he thought she was perfect for the role.

The first season attracted than 4 million viewers during the broadcasting of its 10 episodes.

In Romania, the series was broadcast on TVR Timişoara.

== Main cast ==
- Agnese Nano: Barbara Nardi
- Vanni Corbellini: Thomas Berger
- Giovanni Guidelli: Roberto Ansaldi
- Paola Pitagora: Giovanna Medici
- Delia Boccardo: Tilly Nardi
- Giuseppe Pambieri: Diego Olivares
- Paolo Malco: Giuseppe Ansaldi
- Daniela Poggi: Cristina Ansaldi
- Linda Batista: Denise Nascimento
- Guia Jelo: Costanza De Nittis
- Ray Lovelock: Hans Rudolph
- Warner Bentivegna: Emilio Dupré
- Caterina Vertova: Myriam Santi
- Kaspar Capparoni: Max Rudolph
- Patrizia La Fonte: Olga Sciarra
- Valentina Chico: Caterina Masi
- Alessio Boni: Marco Oberon
- Hélène Nardini: Rita Oberon
- Vanessa Gravina: Paola Dupré
- Giorgio Borghetti: Michele Massa
- Barbara Livi: Martina Morante
- Lorenzo Flaherty: Andrea Bini
- Antonia Liskova: Laura Gellini
- Lorenzo Ciompi: Luca Biagi
- Samuela Sardo: Giulia Donati
- Walter Nudo: Antonio Corradi
- Sonia Aquino: Rossella Natoli
- Alessandra Acciai: Cora Torrini
- Paolo Lanza: Oscar Sensi
- Orso Maria Guerrini: Ivano Nardi
- Ramona Badescu: Sonya Laris
- Nina Soldano: Luciana Galli
- Angiola Baggi: Anna Danesi
- Roberto Alpi: Giulio De Biase
- Emilio Bonucci: Carlo Giudici
- Luigi Maria Burruano: Vittorio Ajello
- Micaela Esdra: Rosalba Baroni
- Elisabetta Pellini: Dori/Lara Baroni
- Anna Melato: Franca Melli
- Giampiero Bianchi: Guido Morante
- Marzia Ubaldi: Amalia Forti
- Stefania Casini: Carla Ferrini
- Nino Castelnuovo: Ernesto Longhi
- Mirca Viola: Luisa Donati
- Laura Chiatti: Stella Loti
- Benedetta Massola: Ludovica Segre
- Carlotta Miti: Sara Segre
- Ivana Monti: Liliana Donati
- Giacomo Piperno: Renato Corradi
- Erika Blanc: Eleonora Loti
- Benedetta Gargari: Giada Donati
- Luigi Diberti: Edoardo De Nittis
- Eleonora Brigliadori: Viviana Costantini
- Corinne Cléry: Viola Dessi
- Paolo Ferrari: Luciano Mauri
- Ivo Garrani: Umberto Curti
