= Hanussen (1988 film) =

- Film poster
- Directed by: István Szabó
- Written by: Péter Dobai; István Szabó
- Produced by: Artur Brauner; Judit Sugár
- Starring: Klaus Maria Brandauer; Erland Josephson; Walter Schmidinger
- Cinematography: Lajos Koltai
- Edited by: Zsuzsa Csákány; Brigitta Kajdácsi; Bettina Rekuc; Éva Szentandrási
- Music by: György Vukán
- Release date: 6 October 1988
- Running time: 140 minutes
- Countries: Hungary, West Germany, Austria
- Languages: Hungarian, German
- Budget: $59,701
- Box office: $82,635

Hanussen is a 1988 Hungarian film directed by István Szabó, centered around the life of Erik Jan Hanussen. Starring Klaus Maria Brandauer, the German-language film received an Academy Award nomination for Best Foreign Language Film. It was also featured at the 1988 Cannes Film Festival.

== Plot ==
During World War I, Klaus Schneider, a train conductor, is hospitalized for head injuries. His doctor, Dr. Bettelheim, discovers Schneider's clairvoyant abilities. Post-war, he reconnects with Captain Nowotny, who becomes his advisor. Schneider, now known as Erik Jan Hanussen, becomes a successful variety star after Nowotny's guidance. He gains fame for predicting a cruise ship's sinking but faces arrest and trial for fraud. However, he's acquitted after showcasing his abilities in court.

In Berlin, where he resides with his girlfriend Valery (Wally) and Nowotny, he socializes with the elite. Despite his earlier claims of being apolitical, he predicts Adolf Hitler's rise to Chancellor, causing tension with Nowotny and Wally. When he foresees the Reichstag fire, the Nazis brand him a traitor, leading to his murder by the SA on March 24-25, 1933, likely influenced by his Jewish background.

== Cast ==
- Klaus Maria Brandauer – Klaus Schneider / Erik Jan Hanussen
- Erland Josephson – Dr. Bettelheim
- Ildikó Bánsági – Sister Betty
- Walter Schmidinger – Propaganda chief
- Károly Eperjes – Captain Tibor Nowotny
- Grażyna Szapołowska – Valery de la Meer
- Colette Pilz-Warren – Dagma
- Adrianna Biedrzyńska – Wally
- György Cserhalmi – Count Trantow-Waldbach
- Michał Bajor - Becker
- Jiří Adamíra - Rattinger
- Róbert Rátonyi - Prof. Gábor
- Kalina Jędrusik – Baroness Stadler
- Gabriela Kownacka – Propaganda chief's wife
- Ewa Błaszczyk – Henni Stahl

== Awards ==
Year	Award	Event	Recipient	Category	Result
1988	Golden Palm	Cannes Film Festival	István Szabó		Nominated

== See also ==
- List of submissions to the 61st Academy Awards for Best Foreign Language Film
- List of Hungarian submissions for the Academy Award for Best Foreign Language Film
