= Villa Amalia (film) =

2009 film

- Film poster
- Directed by: Benoît Jacquot
- Written by: Benoît Jacquot; Julien Boivent; Pascal Quignard
- Based on: Villa Amalia by Pascal Quignard
- Produced by: Edouard Weil
- Starring: Isabelle Huppert
- Cinematography: Caroline Champetier
- Edited by: Luc Barnier
- Music by: Bruno Coulais
- Distributed by: EuropaCorp. Distribution
- Release date: 8 April 2009
- Running time: 94 minutes
- Country: France
- Language: French
- Budget: $4.1 million
- Box office: $4.8 million

Villa Amalia is a 2009 French drama film adapted from the novel Villa Amalia by Pascal Quignard. It is directed by Benoît Jacquot and stars Isabelle Huppert.

== Plot ==
Ann (Isabelle Huppert) is a gifted and brilliant musician whose sense of security falls to pieces when she witnesses her husband kissing another woman. Without hesitation, she abandons him and takes a headlong rush into the arms of a new beginning, embarking on a transnational journey that ultimately takes her to an isolated villa on the secluded island of Ischia, Italy. Once settled, Ann insists on goading herself to fresh extremes, and takes it upon herself to swim out as far into the ocean as possible. Fainting under the scorching summer rays, her floating body is pulled out of the water by local woman Giulia (Maya Sansa), with whom Ann begins to explore a whole new facet of life.

== Cast ==
- Isabelle Huppert as Ann
- Jean-Hugues Anglade as Georges
- Xavier Beauvois as Thomas
- Maya Sansa as Giula
- Clara Bindi as Marion
- Viviana Aliberti as Veri
- Michelle Marquais as La mère d'Ann
- Peter Arens as Ann's father
- Ignazio Oliva as Carlo
- Jean-Pierre Gos as The real-estate
- Jean-Michel Portal as Piano buyer
