= Erik Jan Hanussen =

Austrian publicist and clairvoyant (1889–1933)

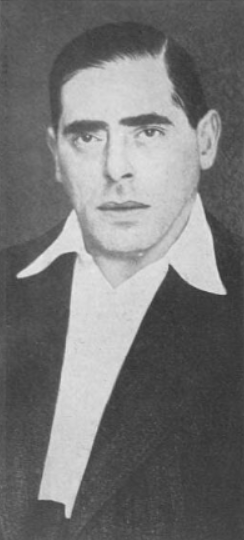
- Born: Hermann Steinschneider; 2 June 1889; Vienna, Austria-Hungary (present-day Austria)
- Died: 25 March 1933 (aged 43); Berlin, Germany
- Occupations: publicist, clairvoyant performer, hypnotist, mentalist, occultist, and astrologer

Erik Jan Hanussen (born Hermann Steinschneider; 2 June 1889 – 25 March 1933) was an Austrian publicist and clairvoyant performer. Acclaimed in his lifetime as a hypnotist, mentalist, occultist and astrologer, Hanussen was active in Weimar Republic Germany and also at the beginning of Nazi Germany. He is said to have instructed Adolf Hitler in performance and the achievement of dramatic effect, and for treating Hitler during his depression. He was assassinated in 1933, likely by members of the Sturmabteilung in an internal power struggle.

== Early years ==
Throughout his life, Hanussen would claim to be a Danish aristocrat, but he was in fact of Moravian Jewish descent, born as Hermann (Herschel Chaim) Steinschneider. Hanussen's Jewish background was either concealed or a nominally-tolerated open secret when he began to associate himself with the Nazi movement.

Steinschneider was born to Siegfried Steinschneider and Juli Kohn in the Ottakring district of Vienna in 1889. Hanussen's parents travelled constantly through Austria and Italy with acting and musical troupes, taking Hanussen with them.

His mother died when he was ten years old, and his father remarried to a widow named Berta Pick, with whom he had two children. Three years later, Hanussen dropped out of school and ran away from home.

== Career ==
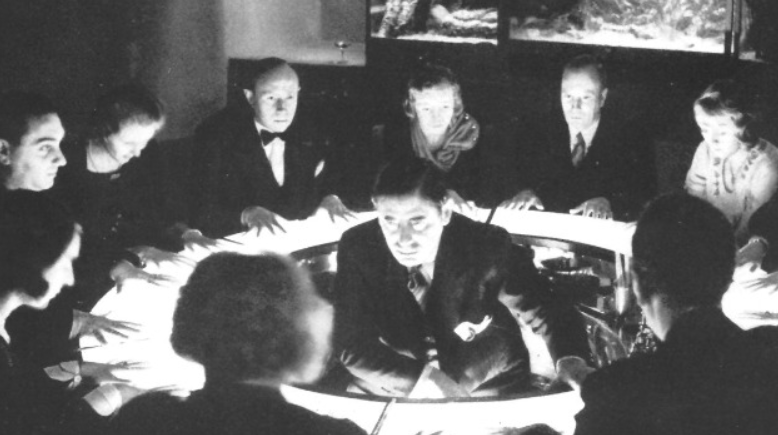
Erik Jan Hanussen (middle) conducting an illuminated séance.

At the age of 20, Hanussen became a chief reporter for the newspaper Der Blitz He was later drafted into the army during World War I. During this time, he used mentalism to entertain the other troops. In 1917, he adopted the name Erik Jan Hanussen, or sometimes Erik van Hanussen, and joined a circus. He soon wrote two booklets dealing with subjects including telepathy, clairvoyance, and mind-reading, which he labelled as fraudulent practices. However, he later treated these practices as genuine and claimed to have supernatural abilities.

Hanussen performed a mind reading and hypnosis act at Scala (Berlin) (former Berliner Eispalast) that catapulted him to stardom. At his height, he enjoyed the company of Germany's military and business elite. It is claimed he was a supporter of the Nazis despite his Jewish ancestry, which was an open secret. Hanussen converted from Judaism to Protestantism in order to join the Nazi Party. He became close with members of the SA ("Brownshirts"). He also published anti-Semitic propaganda.

Stories abound of meetings between Hanussen and Hitler, including an encounter shortly before the election of November 1932, during which Hanussen taught Hitler his crowd control techniques of using gestures and dramatic pauses. Hanussen was also quite close to other important Nazi officials, to whom he had often lent money, including Wolf-Heinrich Graf von Helldorff, Karl Ernst, and Friedrich Wilhelm Ohst.

Dr. Walter C. Langer, a psychoanalyst, prepared a psychological profile of Hitler for the United States' Office of Strategic Services (OSS) in 1943. The profile included a reference to Hanussen: "...during the early 1920s Hitler took regular lessons in speaking and in mass psychology from a man named [Hanussen] who was also a practising astrologer and fortune-teller. He was an extremely clever individual who taught Hitler a great deal concerning the importance of staging meetings to obtain the greatest dramatic effect."

In 1931 Hanussen purchased a Breslau printing firm and began publishing an occult journal, Hanussen Magazin and Bunte Wochenschau, a popular bi-weekly Berlin tabloid which included astrological columns. He used the proceeds from his publishing ventures and stage shows to purchase a mansion which became known as "The Palace of the Occult", which he renovated and turned into a luxurious interactive theatre for fortune telling games. Guests would sit around a large circular table and place their palms on glass with symbols lit from beneath; the room lights would be lowered in a séance-like fashion; and various gimmicks would highlight Hanussen's dramatic verbal presentation of prophecies to the guests. He predicted events in the lives of the individuals present, but controversy arose when he predicted the future of Germany. He became successful, was always in demand in various venues, and had a full-time valet.

Alfred Neubauer, a famous motor racing team manager, refers to Hanussen in his autobiography, Speed Was My Life (first published in English in 1960). In the chapter 'A Prophecy Comes True', he describes a prediction made by Hanussen before the race at AVUS in Germany in May 1932. While at the Roxy Bar with other drivers, Neubauer challenged Hanussen to predict the winner of the following day's race. After some 'leg pulling', Hanussen wrote two names on a piece of paper, which he folded, and put in an envelope. This was placed in the custody of the barman. He had strict instructions that it be left unopened until after the race. Hanussen announced, 'One of us at this table will win tomorrow, another will die. The two names are in this envelope.' During the race, driver Georg Christian of Lobkowicz was killed, and Manfred von Brauchitsch won. After the race, Neubauer states he opened the envelope and found those names inside. Several days later, a Berlin newspaper reported that Hanussen had urged the German Automobile Club to persuade Prince Lobkowicz not to take part in the race, but Club officials had taken no action.

=== Reichstag fire and assassination ===
Predicting the Reichstag fire, a decisive event that allowed recently appointed Chancellor of Germany Adolf Hitler to seize absolute power in 1933, was Hanussen's most famous feat of clairvoyance. It also was possibly a miscalculated use of inside information that led to his death shortly thereafter.

Hanussen was assassinated on 25 March 1933, probably by a group of SA men, and was hastily buried in a field on the outskirts of Berlin, near Stahnsdorf. He was potential competition to Hermann Göring and Joseph Goebbels for the attention of their Führer, which may also have led to his murder. Other theories have implicated Wolf-Heinrich Graf von Helldorff as ordering Hanussen's death, suggesting that Helldorff believed Jewish background a liability, or owed him money; or SA leader Karl Ernst. Hanussen's body was discovered over a month later.

There are unsubstantiated claims that he may have been involved in the Reichstag fire, hypnotizing and directing Marinus van der Lubbe, the convicted arsonist, to commit the act.

Erik Jan Hanussen is buried in the Südwestkirchhof, Stahnsdorf, near Berlin.

== Personal life ==
Hanussen's daughter, Erika Fuchs Steinschneider, was born to his first wife Theresia Luksch in 1920.

== In fiction ==
=== Films ===
- Hypnose (1919), starring Erik Jan Hanussen
- Der rätselhafte Tod (1921), starring Erik Jan Hanussen
- Hanussen (1955), played by O. W. Fischer
- Hanussen (1988), played by Klaus Maria Brandauer, director Istvan Szabo. The film fictionalizes many aspects of Hanussen's life, including his name ('Klaus Schneider' in the film) and various details of his early life.
- Invincible (2001), played by Tim Roth, director Werner Herzog. The film depicts a largely-fictional professional relationship between Hanussen and Jewish strongman Zishe Breitbart.
- The Illusionist (2006), the protagonist Eisenheim, played by Edward Norton, is based loosely on Hanussen. He has a similar Jewish background and comes to prominence for a magic show that incorporates elements of spiritualism and the occult, a fictionalized version of Hanussen's act.
- The King's Man (2021) includes Hanussen as a character played by Daniel Brühl.

=== Theatre ===
- Palace of the Occult (2015), written and performed by Neil Tobin

=== Novel ===
- El mentalista de Hitler (2016), a "historical noir" novel written in Spanish by the Uruguayan author Gervasio Posadas, closely based on Erik Jan Hanussen's true biography.

=== Other mentions in popular media ===
- In the Japanese television drama Laughing Matryoshka (2024), a politician is heavily influenced by a former classmate, now his secretary. A reporter who is investigating him finds a connection between the secretary and Hanussen.

== See also ==
- 1920s Berlin
- Karl Maria Wiligut
- Arthur Trebitsch
- List of unsolved murders (1900–1979)

== Sources ==
- Bernauw, Patrick, Guy Didelez, and Mirjam Pressler. 1997. Brennende Sterne. Bindlach: Loewe.
- Cziffra, Géza von. 1978. Hanussen, Hellseher des Teufels: d. Wahrheit über d. Reichstagsbrand. München: Herbig.
- Frei, B. (1980) Der Hellseher: Leben und Sterben des Erik Jan Hanussen, Prometh-Verlag: Koln.
- Gauding, Daniela. 2006. Siegmund Sische Breitbart: Eisenkönig, stärkster Mann der Welt: Breitbart versus Hanussen. Teetz: Hentrich & Hentrich.
- Gordon, M. (2001) Hanussen: Hitler's Jewish Clairvoyant, Feral House. ISBN 0922915687.
- Hanussen, Erik Jan. 1992. Manuale di lettura del pensiero: corso pratico in 12 lezioni. Roma: Edizioni Mediterranee.
- Hanussen, Erik J. 1990. Der Untergang von New York: Roman. Köln: Smaragd-Verl.
- Hanussen, Erik Jan. 1989. La notte dei maghi: autobiografia di un veggente. Roma: Edizioni Mediterranee.
- Hanussen, Erik Jan. 1979. Unser zweites Leben. Klosterneuburg/Wien: Aktuell-Verlag. Spiritualist ZauberkuÌnstler Oesterreich Deutschland.
- Hanussen, Erik Jan. 1932. Berliner Woche (5-27: Erik Jan Hanussen's Berliner Wochenschau; 28-40: Hanussens Bunte Wochenschau; 41-44: Die Hanussen-Zeitung; 45: Bunte Wochenschau; 46. 47: Astropolitische Rundschau). Berlin: (Hanussen).
- Eng, Peter, and Erik Jan Hanussen. 1930. Lache Medusa. Berlin: Gurlitt-Verl.
- Hanussen, Erik Jan, and Heinrich Wissiak. 1930. Der Leitmeritzer Hellseher-Prozess Hanussen; ausführliche Wiedergabe der sensationellen Gerichts-Verhandlung mit zahlreichen bisher unveröffentlichten Dokumenten. Teplitz-Schönau: Im Selbstverlage.
- Hanussen, Erik Jan. 1930. Meine Lebenslinie. Berlin: Universitas.
- Hanussen, Erik Jan. 1920. Schließen Sie die Augen! Brettelieder. Wien: Nestroy-Verlag.
- Hanussen, Erik Jan. 1920. Das Gedankenlesen: Telepathie. Wien: Waldheim-Eberle.
- Hanussen, Erik Jan. 1915. Was so über's Brettl ging Poetika aus Musentempeln, die ohne Vorhang spielen. Olmütz: Groak.
- Kugel, Wilfried. 1998. Hanussen: die wahre Geschichte des Hermann Steinschneider. Düsseldorf: Grupello.
- Magida, A. (2011) The Nazi Seance: The Strange Story of the Jewish Psychic in Hitler's Circle Palgrave Macmillan Books.
- Müller, Delia. 2006. Das bittere Erbe: Erika Fuchs, Tochter des Hellsehers Hanussen, erzählt. Bolzano: Athesia Spectrum.
- Palacios, J. (2005) Erik Jan Hanussen, la vida y los tiempos del mago de Hitler, Barcelona: Oberón.
