= Klaus Maria Brandauer =

Austrian actor and director

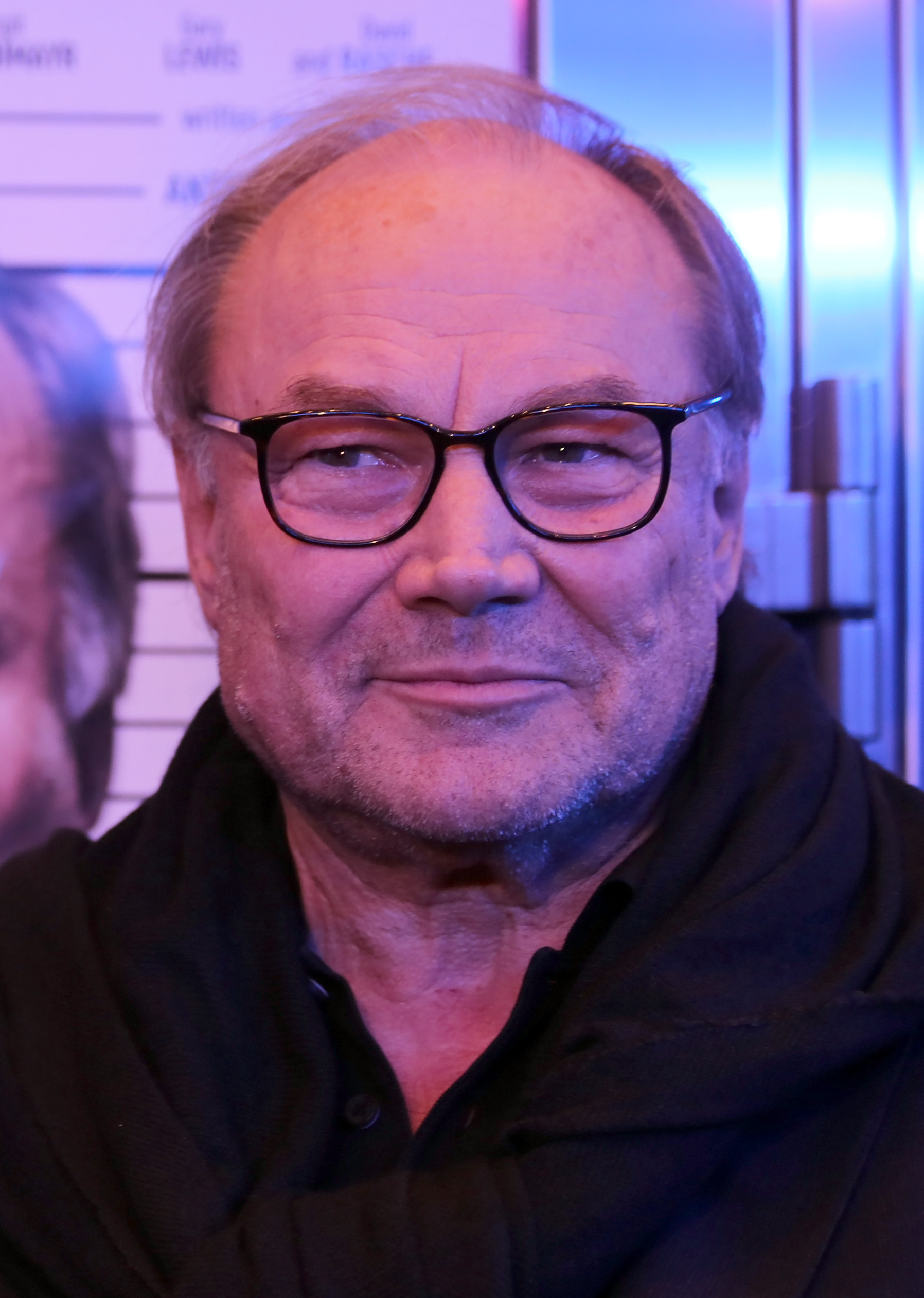
- Brandauer at the Vienna International Film Festival 2012
- Born: Klaus Georg Steng; 22 June 1943 (age 83); Bad Aussee, Styria, Austria
- Occupations: Actor, director
- Years active: 1962–present
- Spouse(s): Karin Mueller (m. 1963; died 1992) (1 child) Natalie Krenn (m. 2007)
- Children: 1

Klaus Maria Brandauer (Austrian German: [klaʊs maˈriːa ˈbrandaʊɐ]; born Klaus Georg Steng; 22 June 1943) is an Austrian actor and director. He is also a professor at the Max Reinhardt Seminar.

Brandauer is known internationally for his roles in Mephisto (1981), Never Say Never Again (1983), Streets of Gold (1986), Hanussen (1988), Burning Secret (1988), The Russia House (1990), and White Fang (1991).

For his supporting role as Bror von Blixen-Finecke in Out of Africa (1985), he was nominated for an Academy Award and won a Golden Globe Award.

Brandauer has a working knowledge of and has acted in at least five languages including German, Italian, Hungarian, English and French.

== Personal life ==
Brandauer was born as Klaus Georg Steng in Bad Aussee, Austria (then part of the German Reich). He is the son of Maria Brandauer and Georg Steng (or Stenj), a civil servant. He subsequently took his mother's name as part of his professional name, Klaus Maria Brandauer.

His first wife was Karin Katharina Müller (14 October 1945 – 13 November 1992), an Austrian film and television director and screenwriter, from 1963 until her death in 1992, aged 47, from cancer. They married in 1963 and had one son, Christian. Brandauer married Natalie Krenn in 2007.

== Career ==
Brandauer began acting on stage in 1962. After working in national theatre and television, he made his film debut in English in 1972, in The Salzburg Connection. In 1975, he played in Derrick – in Season 2, Episode 8 called "Pfandhaus". His starring and award-winning role in István Szabó's Mephisto (1981) playing a self-absorbed actor, launched his international career. (He would later act in Szabó's 1985 Oberst Redl.)

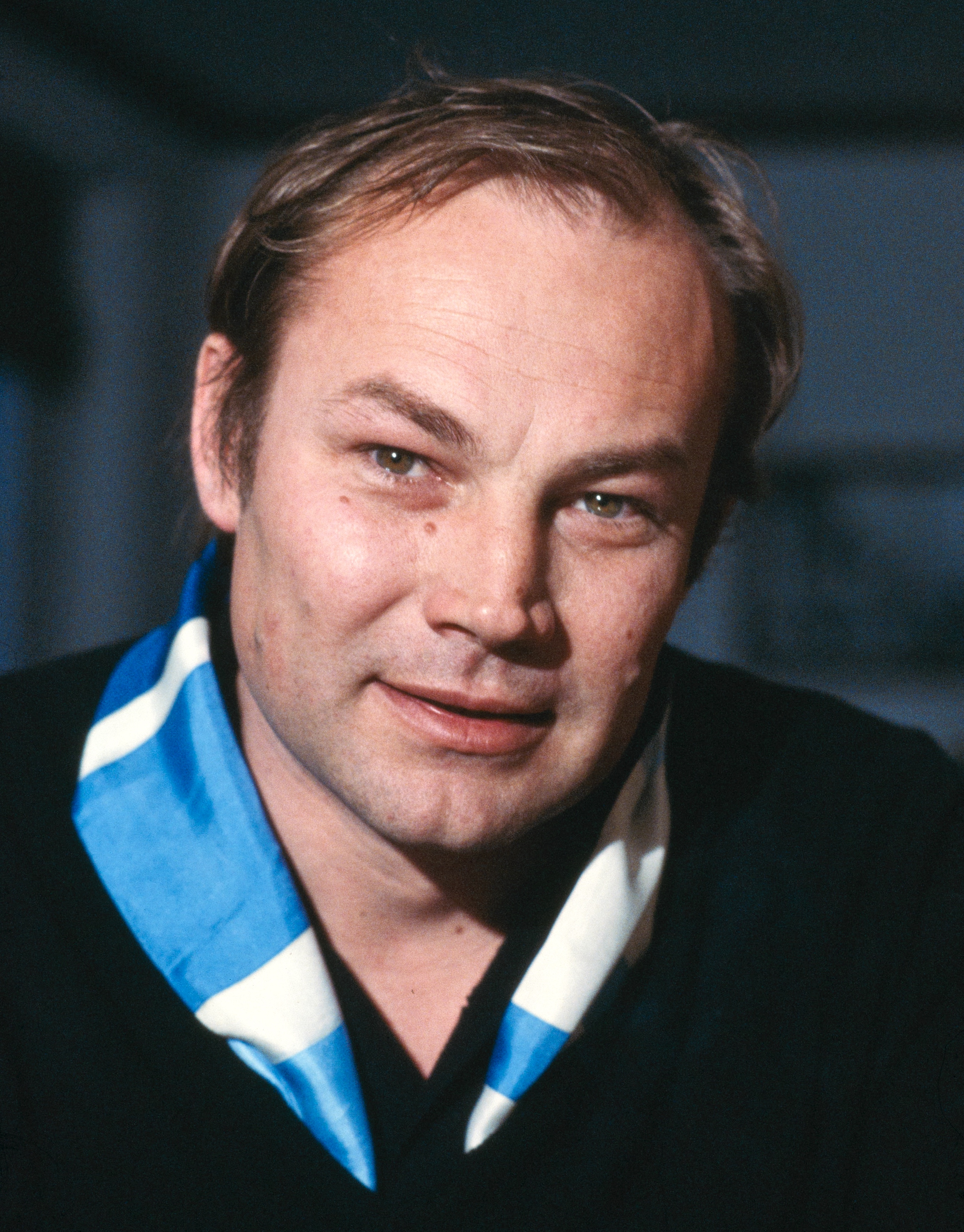
Brandauer in 1982

Following his role in Mephisto, Brandauer appeared as Maximillian Largo in Never Say Never Again (1983), a remake of the 1965 James Bond film Thunderball. Roger Ebert said of his performance: "For one thing, there's more of a human element in the movie, and it comes from Klaus Maria Brandauer, as Largo. Brandauer is a wonderful actor, and he chooses not to play the villain as a cliché. Instead, he brings a certain poignancy and charm to Largo, and since Connery always has been a particularly human James Bond, the emotional stakes are more convincing this time."

He starred in Out of Africa (1985), opposite Meryl Streep and Robert Redford. Brandauer was nominated for an Oscar and won a Golden Globe for the performance. In 1987, he was the Head of the Jury at the 37th Berlin International Film Festival. In 1988, he appeared in Hanussen opposite Erland Josephson and Ildikó Bánsági.

Brandauer was originally cast as Marko Ramius in The Hunt for Red October. That role eventually went to Sean Connery, who played James Bond to Brandauer's Largo in Never Say Never Again. He co-starred with Connery again in The Russia House (1990).

His other film roles have been in The Lightship (1986), Streets of Gold (1986), Burning Secret (1988), White Fang (1991), Becoming Colette (1991), Introducing Dorothy Dandridge (1999, as director Otto Preminger), and Everyman's Feast (2002). In 1989, he participated in TF1's two-part historical film La Révolution française, playing the role of Georges Danton. He has also appeared as King Nebuchadnezzar II in 1998, in Time Life's Jeremiah, from The Bible Collection: The Old Testament.

Brandauer has directed two films: Seven Minutes (1989), in which he starred as attempted Hitler assassin Georg Elser; and Mario and the Magician (1994), based on the 1929 novella by Thomas Mann, in which he starred as Cipolla, a magician with hypnotic powers.

In August 2006, Brandauer's much-awaited production of The Threepenny Opera gained a mixed reception. Brandauer had resisted questions about how his production of Bertolt Brecht and Kurt Weill's classic musical comedy about the criminal MacHeath would differ from earlier versions, and his production featured Mack the Knife in a three-piece suit and white gloves, stuck to Brecht's text, and avoided any references to contemporary politics or issues.

In March 2013, Brandauer starred in a Peter Stein production of Samuel Beckett's Krapp's Last Tape.

== Filmography ==
Year	Title	Role	Notes
1970	Friede den Hütten! Krieg den Palästen!	Georg Büchner	TV film
1972	The Salzburg Connection	Johann Kronsteiner	
1975	Derrick	Erich Forster	TV series Episode: "Pfandhaus"
1979	A Sunday in October	Hoffmann	
1981	Mephisto	Hendrik Höfgen	
1983	Never Say Never Again	Maximilian Largo	
1985	Colonel Redl	Alfred Redl	
1985	Quo Vadis?	Nero	TV miniseries
1985	The Lightship	Captain Miller	
1985	Out of Africa	Baron Bror Blixen	Golden Globe Award for Best Supporting Actor – Motion Picture; Nominated—Academy Award for Best Supporting Actor
1986	Streets of Gold	Alek Neuman	
1988	Hanussen	Erik Jan Hanussen	
1988	Burning Secret	Baron Alexander von Hauenstein	
1989	Spider's Web	Benjamin Lenz	
1989	Seven Minutes	Georg Elser	Also director
1989	La Révolution française	Georges Danton	TV miniseries
1990	The Russia House	Dante	
1991	White Fang	Alex Larson	
1991	Becoming Colette	Henry Gauthier-Villars	
1994	Felidae	Pascal/Claudandus	Voice only
1994	Mario and the Magician	Cipolla	Also director
1998	Jeremiah	King Nebuchadnezzar	TV film
1999	Rembrandt	Rembrandt	
1999	Introducing Dorothy Dandridge	Otto Preminger	TV film
2000	Dykaren	Orlov	
2001	Druids	Julius Caesar	
2002	Everyman's Feast	Jan Jedermann	
2002	Between Strangers	Alexander Bauer	
2003	Entrusted	Gregor Lämmle	TV film
2006	Kronprinz Rudolfs letzte Liebe	Emperor Franz Joseph	TV film
2009	Tetro	Carlo Tetrocini	
2011	Manipulation	Urs Rappold	
2013	The Strange Case of Wilhelm Reich	Wilhelm Reich	
2013	Blank	Ernst Lemden	TV film
2020	Zárójelentés	S doktor	
2021	Enemies	Konrad Biegler	TV film

== Awards ==
- 1982: BAFTA Award for Most Promising Newcomer to Leading Film Roles – Mephisto (nominated)
- 1985: Kansas City Film Critics Circle Award for Best Supporting Actor – Out of Africa (won)
- 1985: National Board of Review Award for Best Supporting Actor – Out of Africa (won)
- 1985: NYFCC Award for Best Supporting Actor – Out of Africa (won)
- 1986: Golden Globe Award for Best Supporting Actor - Motion Picture – Out of Africa (won)
- 1986: Academy Award for Best Supporting Actor – Out of Africa (nominated)
- 1987: BAFTA Award for Best Actor in a Supporting Role – Out of Africa (nominated)
- 1988: European Film Award for Best Actor – Hanussen (nominated)
- 1988: Golden Ciak for Best Actor – Hanussen (won)
- 1989: Bavarian Film Awards for Best Actor – Burning Secret (won)
- 1995: Andrei Tarkovsky Award for Mario and the Magician (won)
- 1995: Golden St. George for Mario and the Magician (nominated)
- 2000: Golden Globe Award for Best Supporting Actor – Series, Miniseries or Television Film – Introducing Dorothy Dandridge (nominated)
- 2000: Primetime Emmy Award for Outstanding Supporting Actor in a Limited Series or Movie – Introducing Dorothy Dandridge (nominated)

== See also ==
- List of German-speaking Academy Award winners and nominees
