= Carlo Siliotto =

Italian film composer (born 1950)

- Born: January 10, 1950 (age 76); Rome, Italy
- Genres: Film score, Italian Folk
- Occupation: Film composer,
- Years active: 1972–present
- Label: La-La Land Records
- Website: carlosiliotto.com

Carlo Siliotto (born 10 January 1950) is an Italian film composer.

== Early life and career ==
Carlo Siliotto was born in Rome in 1950. He began playing guitar and violin at an early age, and pursued formal studies in composition at the Conservatory of Frosinone under the direction of Maestro Daniele Paris.

He was among the founders of the popular folk band Canzoniere del Lazio (1973-1980). The group released six albums, revisiting traditional songs and music from Southern Italy and mixing musical styles, particularly combining rock, jazz and classical music with Mediterranean and ethnic music. Over the course of its lifespan Canzoniere del Lazio went on several national and international tours, performing across Europe and in several African countries, such as Somalia, Tanzania, Mozambique, Zambia, Kenya.

After the dissolution of Canzoniere, Siliotto released a concept album Ondina (Polygram), and took a leading role as violinist and composer for Carnascialia, a project involving several prominent artists in the Italian folk scene of the period. In 1980 he founded a new ensemble, Gramigna, performing on tour in Greece, Italy, Hungary, Germany, Nigeria and Mozambique. Between 1980 and 1984 Siliotto worked as violinist, composer and arranger on many albums by artists such as Domenico Modugno, Antonello Venditti, Francesco De Gregori and others.

== Film scoring ==
In 1984 Siliotto decided to dedicate his career on writing music for film and television. Since the early '80s, he has worked on more than a hundred scores including theatrical features, documentaries and television series. Carlo collaborated with directors such as Patricia Riggen, Eugenio Derbez, Carlo Lizzani, Jonathan Hensleigh, Maurizio Nichetti, Robert Markowitz, Ricky Tognazzi, Carlos Saura-Medrano, Clive Donner, Sergei Bodrov, Ivan Passer, Carlo Carlei, Joseph Sargent, Roger Young, Uli Edel, Stefano Rulli, Sergio Sanchez Suarez, Robert Allan Ackermann, Gabriela Tagliavini and many others.

In 2007 he received a Golden Globe nomination for his work on Nomad: The Warrior (Bodrov-Passer), and in 2011 he was nominated by the Italian critics for the “Nastro d’Argento” for the music of Il Padre e lo Straniero (Tognazzi). In 2004 was nominated for Best Music by the International Film Music Critics Association (IFMCA) for The Punisher. In 2014 was nominated for Best Music for comedy by the IFMCA, and won the “Colonne Sonore” award for Best Original Score for a foreign film, both for his work on Instruction Not Included (No Se Aceptan Devoluciones) by Eugenio Derbez. Carlo's latest work, Miracles From Heaven (Riggen), was released on March 16 Sony/Columbia Pictures.

Carlo is also a prolific composer of stage theater music. Through the years, he has collaborated with directors like Otello Sarzi, Marco Parodi, Carlo Cecchi to name a few. His music has also been used by several choreographers including Fiorenza D'Alessandro and Adriana Borriello.

Carlo currently lives and works in Los Angeles, California.

== Credits ==
=== 1980s ===
- Mino (1986)

=== 1990s ===
- Breath of Life (1990)
- Fluke (1995)
- Uninvited (1999)

=== 2000s ===
- Paul the Apostle (2000)
- The Good War (2002)
- Julius Caesar (2002)
- The Punisher (Score) (2004)
- Nomad (2005)
- Under the Same Moon (2007)
- The Ramen Girl (2008)

=== 2010s ===
- The Father and the Foreigner (2010)
- Without Men (2011)
- Tequila: Historia de una Pasión (2011)
- Vivaldi (2013 film; 2010 is a different film, scored by Klaus Badelt)
- Instructions Not Included (2013)
- Miracles from Heaven (2016)
