= Follow Your Heart (novel) =

1994 book by Susanna Tamaro

Follow Your Heart (Italian: Va' dove ti porta il cuore) is a book written by Susanna Tamaro in 1994, originally published in Italian by Baldini & Castoldi. The book has been translated into at least 44 languages, including English, and has sold over 18 million copies.

== Plot ==
This book is an epistolary novel in which an elderly woman writes letters to her granddaughter who has left Italy for America. She writes about the poor choices she has made, which have led to several lives being ruined.
