= Villa Amalia (Athens) =

Coordinates: 37°59′36.77″N 23°43′37.51″E

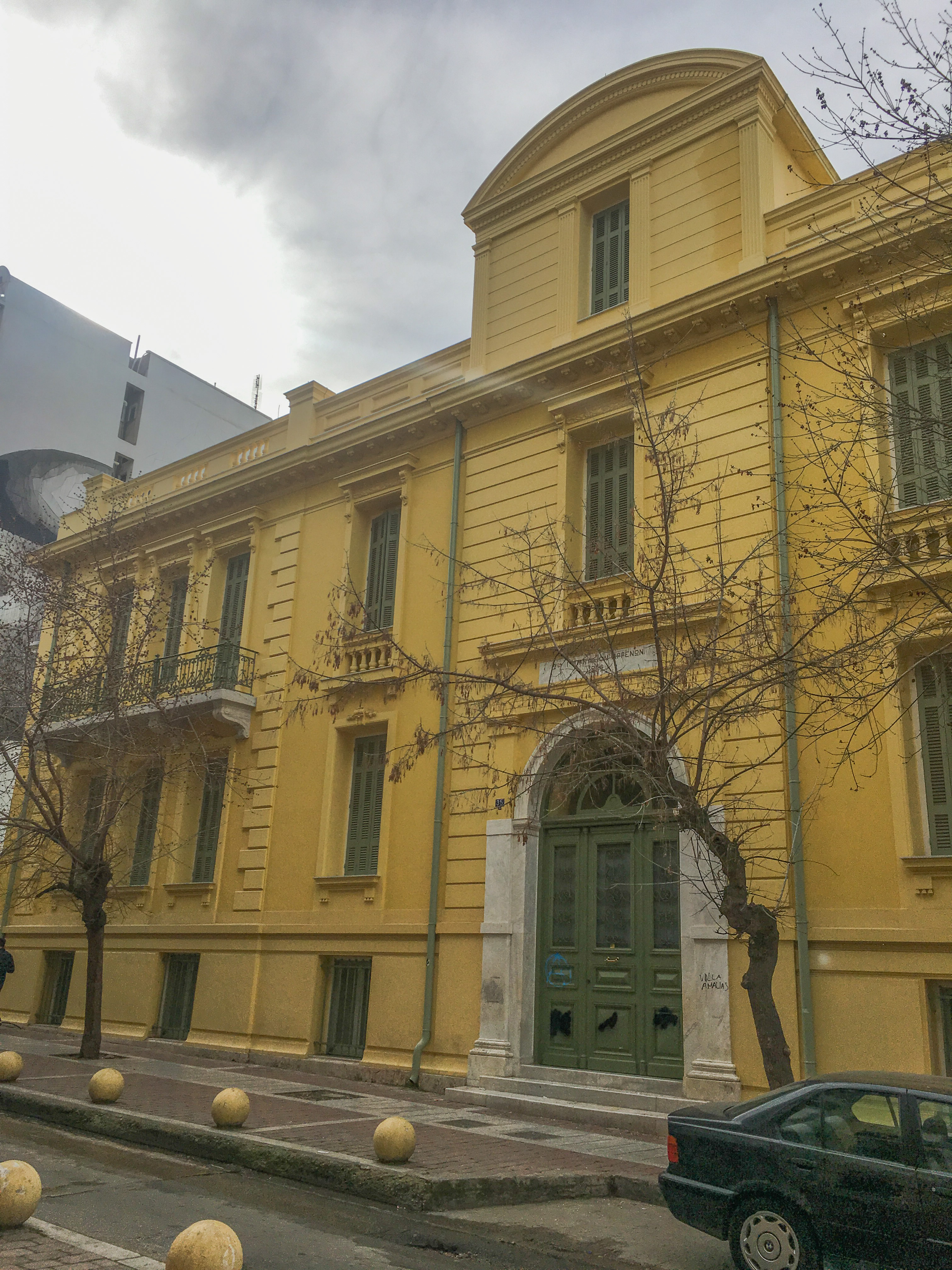
Villa Amalia, exterior view, March 2019

Villa Amalia is the name of the building that hosted the former Second High School of Athens in Greece. It is located on the corner of Acharnon and Heiden streets, near Victoria metro station. It was an anarchist squat before its eviction in 2012. It reopened as a school in 2016.

== Social center ==
Villa Amalia was occupied since 1990, making it one of the oldest Greek squats.

In its lifetime as a squat, the center organized cultural events such as political debates, film screenings and concerts. The authorities claimed that violent protesters were protected within the villa after anti-austerity demonstrations.

Villa Amalia was evicted in December 2012. The police claimed to have found materials to make 1500 molotov cocktails. The center was one target in a police campaign to evict up to 40 known squats throughout Greece. SYRIZA was critical of the eviction, blaming the government for using it as a distraction from bigger scandals.

150 anarchists attempted to reoccupy the building on January 9, 2013. They temporarily regained possession but were then evicted by the police, with 92 arrests. Protesters gathered with banners pledging solidarity and occupied the offices of Greek social-democratic party DIMAR. The police then raided a nearby squat and in response people blockaded the entrance of a building where Prime Minister Antonis Samaras was supposed to give a talk.

Thousands of people soon took to the streets in support of the arrestees. The crowd, estimated at 8,000 people by the organizers and at 3,000 by the police, marched through central Athens to the law courts. All 92 arrestees were charged with trespassing on public property and then released.

== School ==
The Mayor of the City of Athens Giorgos Kaminis announced in February 2013 that the building would be transformed back into a school or cultural center. It had been sealed off to prevent reoccupation by anarchists.

It reopened as a high school in September 2016.
