= Fabio Fulco =

Italian actor (born 1970)

- Born: 4 August 1970 (age 54); Naples, Italy
- Other names: Fabio Bifulco
- Occupation(s): Actor, Film director
- Years active: 1996–present
- Height: 1.90 m (6 ft 3 in)
- Partner: Veronica Papa
- Children: 1

Fabio Fulco (Bifulco) (born August 4, 1970, in Naples, Italy) is an Italian actor.

== Biography ==
Born August 4, 1970 in San Giuseppe Vesuviano, Naples, Italy.

He started as an actor of Italian TV. Since 1998 — in the movies. He played in 30 films and television series.

He appeared in films of famous directors — Franco Zeffirelli, Dino Risi, Ruggero Deodato.
