= Filippo Scicchitano =

Italian actor (born 1993)

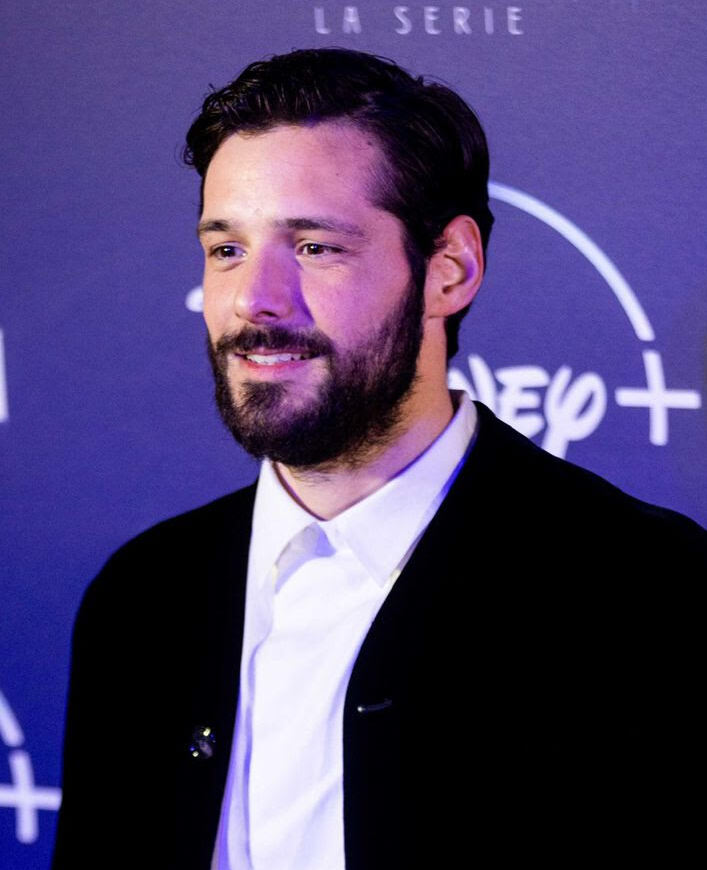
- Scicchitano in 2022
- Born: 13 October 1993 (age 32); Rome, Italy
- Occupation: Actor

Filippo Scicchitano (Italian pronunciation: [fiˈlippo ʃʃikkiˈtaːno]; born 13 October 1993) is an Italian film and television actor.

== Life and career ==
Born in Rome into a family of Calabrian origins, Scicchitano made his film debut at 16 years old, winning an audition for the role of Luca in Francesco Bruni's Easy!. The following year, he had the leading role in Francesca Comencini's A Special Day, which was entered into the competition at the 69th Venice International Film Festival. In 2013, he received the Biraghi Award at the Nastro d'Argento Awards. In the following years he worked in several high-profile films by Ferzan Özpetek, Giovanni Veronesi and Giacomo Campiotti.

Scicchitano is also active on television, with main roles in numerous series, notably Lolita Lobosco and The Ignorant Angels.

== Filmography ==
=== Film ===
Year	Title	Role(s)	Notes
2011	Easy!	Luca	
2012	A Special Day	Marco	
2013	White as Milk, Red as Blood	Leo	
2013	Il mondo fino in fondo	Davide	
2014	Fasten Your Seatbelts	Fabio	
2017	No Country for Young Men	Sandro	
2018	Il confine	Bruno Furian	
2019	An Almost Ordinary Summer	Sandro	
2020	Weekend	Giulio	
2022	(Im)perfetti criminali	Riccardo	
2023	Cattiva coscienza	Filippo	
2024	Finché notte non ci separi	Valrio Di Castro	

=== Television ===
Year	Title	Role(s)	Notes
2015	Sotto copertura: La cattura di Iovine	Emilio	2 episodes
2021–2024	Lolita Lobosco	Danilo Martini	Main role (season 1-2), guest star (season 3); 11 episodes
2022	The Ignorant Angels	Luciano	Main role
2025	Balene – Amiche per sempre	Emanuele	Series

=== Music videos ===
Year	Title	Artist(s)	Notes
2013	"Se si potesse non morire"	Modà	
