= Killing of Carlo Giuliani =

Death during an anti-globalization demonstration outside the 2001 G8 summit in Italy

Carlo Giuliani
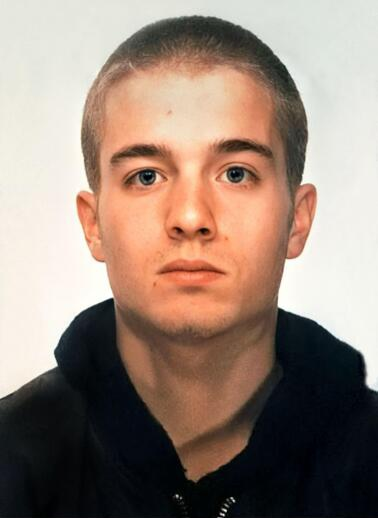
- Born: March 14, 1978; Rome, Italy
- Died: July 20, 2001 (aged 23); Genoa, Italy
- Cause of death: Gunshot wound
- Resting place: Monumental Cemetery of Staglieno
- Occupation: Student
- Known for: Shot and killed by Carabinieri while participating in riot during the 27th G8 summit
- Movement: Anti-globalization

Carlo Giuliani was an Italian anti-globalization protester who was shot dead while attacking a Carabinieri van with a fire extinguisher, by an officer who was inside the van, during the anti-globalization riots outside the July 2001 G8 summit in Genoa, Italy, making his the first death during an anti-globalization demonstration since the movement's rise from the 1999 Seattle WTO protests.

Photographs showed Giuliani, a 23-year-old Roman living in Genoa, throwing a fire extinguisher towards the van, a pistol firing a shot in return from the van, and Giuliani's body having been run over by the van. Charges against the officer were initially dropped without trial as a judge ruled that the ricocheted bullet was fired in self-defense, but the incident became a point of public scrutiny.

Eight years after the incident, the European Court of Human Rights ruled that the Italian forces had acted within their limits, but awarded damages for the state's procedural handling of the case. Appeals upheld the ruling, and Giuliani's family later filed a civil suit.

Giuliani was memorialized in music tributes, such as Jaye Muller's CARLO and public monuments, and is remembered as a symbol of the 2001 G8 protests. The 2002 documentary Carlo Giuliani, Boy, recounts the incident.

== Incident ==
Giuliani moments before (left) and after being fatally wounded. The gun that fired the fatal shot can be seen in the top right corner of the first photograph.

In July 2001, anti-globalization demonstrators protested the 27th G8 summit in Genoa, Italy, where leaders of the world's major industrialized nations met. Among these protesters was Carlo Giuliani, a 23-year-old Roman Italian and resident of Genoa, whom a police officer shot and killed during what had become a riot two miles from the summit. It was the first death in an anti-globalization demonstration since its rise from the 1999 Seattle WTO protests. According to a Reuters photographer, who took photographs of the incident, Giuliani and several other young, male protesters had surrounded and attacked a police van with rocks and other weapons. Italian television broadcast several photographs, in which Giuliani threw a fire extinguisher at the van. A hand from inside the van then fired a pistol in response, and Giuliani collapsed behind the van. Further photographs and reports show that the van had run over his legs twice after he was shot. The Italian interior minister confirmed that Giuliani had been hit by a bullet fired in self-defense by a police officer, who was later hospitalized for his injuries.

The New York Times said it was unclear why the riot police had live ammunition, whereas other Genoa riot police used water cannons, riot sticks, and tear gas elsewhere in the city. About 1,000 people attended Giuliani's funeral in Genoa, his coffin ornamented in ferns and A.S. Roma's flag.

== Investigations ==
In the case against Carabiniere Mario Placanica, evidence was given by a ballistics expert that the fatal bullet had "ricocheted off plaster". All charges against Mario Placanica were dropped when Judge Daloiso, who presided over the case, concluded that the fatal bullet that struck Giuliani was not directly aimed at Giuliani, and ruled that Placanica had acted in self-defense. The case was not taken to trial.

However, during a later trial in Genoa of some demonstrators allegedly involved in clashes the same day Giuliani was killed, the same forensic doctor, professor Marco Salvi, who had been a consultant to Silvio Franz, the prosecutor who led the case against Mario Placanica, testified that Giuliani had been the victim of a "direct hit", thus contradicting the evidence previously given and laying doubt on the decision made based on the alleged change of direction of the bullet. Medics tending to Giuliani after he was run over testified that his heart was still beating, and this was confirmed by professor Salvi during the trial in Genoa. To confuse the situation further, in late 2003 Placanica told the Bologna daily Il Resto Del Carlino that "I've been used to cover up the responsibility of others." He claimed that the bullet found in Giuliani's body was not of the caliber or type fired by the pistols of the Carabinieri, and claimed the deadly shot had come from somewhere in the piazza outside. After making this statement, Placanica was involved in a car accident that his lawyer claimed was "very suspicious." Placanica was allegedly kept in seclusion following the incident, and his parents were not allowed to visit him in the hospital.

On August 25, 2009, the European Court of Human Rights notified in writing its judgement in the case of Giuliani and Gaggio vs. Italy. It ruled that no excessive force was used and it was not established that Italian authorities had failed to comply with their positive obligations to protect Carlo Giuliani's life. However, the Court also ruled that Italy had not complied with its procedural obligations in connection with the death of Carlo Giuliani and awarded a total of €40,000 in non-pecuniary damages to the three applicants. In 2010, the case was referred to the Court's Grand Chamber on appeals from both sides; the Grand Chamber has held in 2011, that there had been no violation of the European Convention, although seven judges from seventeen dissented.

== Legacy ==
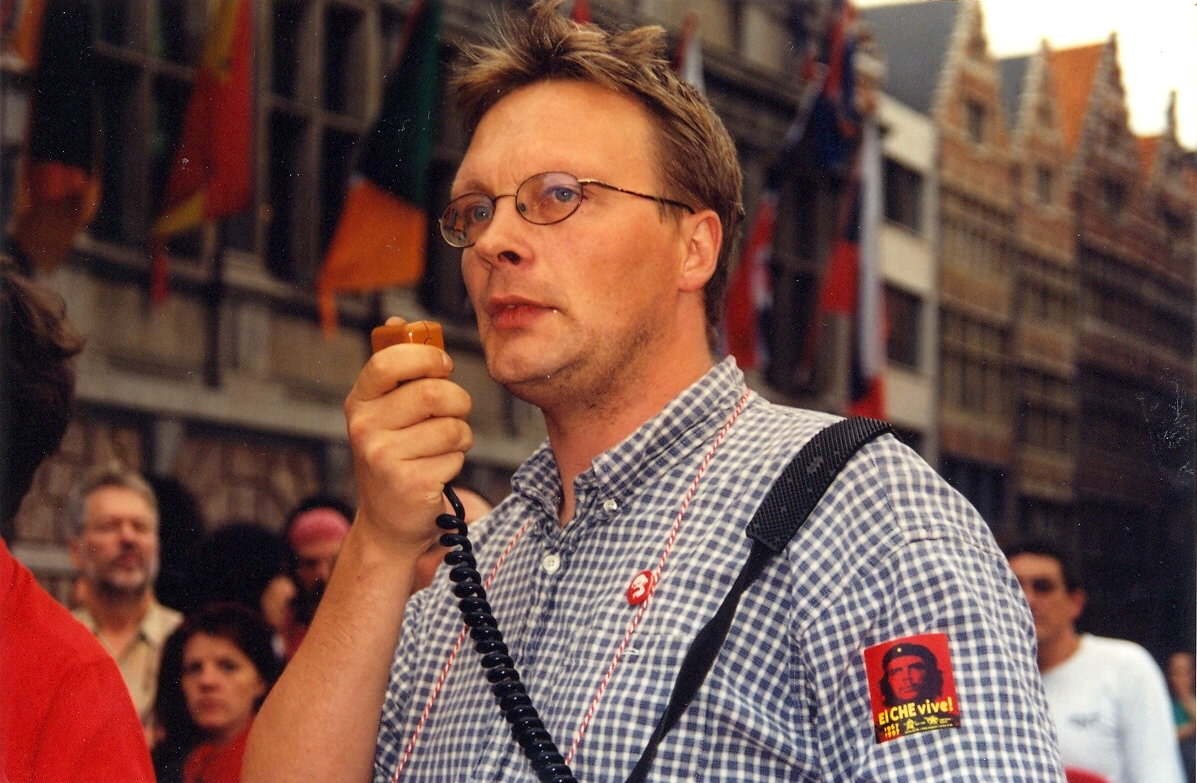
Peter Mertens, future party leader of the Workers' Party of Belgium, during a commemoration in honor of Giuliani in Antwerp in 2001.

Giuliani's' death had an immediate effect of quelling the 2001 G8 protests and the longer-term effect of reducing the public profile of the next summit. The Saturday protest in Genoa was expected to be its largest, with 100,000 participants, but turnout was halved after the killing as groups withdrew. Nonviolent demonstrators, in hindsight, distanced themselves from groups whose battles with police they blamed for ruining their peaceful message. The G8 announced that the next summit would instead be held at a remote resort at a fifth of the 2001 summit's size to reduce opportunities for violent protest.

In 2002, Francesca Comencini directed a documentary film titled Carlo Giuliani, ragazzo about the shooting. It was screened out of competition at the 2002 Cannes Film Festival. Multiple songs have paid tribute to Giuliani's memory.
