= Counterpart (TV series) =

2017 science fiction thriller television series

- Genre: Thriller; Science fiction
- Created by: Justin Marks
- Starring: J. K. Simmons; Olivia Williams; Harry Lloyd; Nazanin Boniadi; Sara Serraiocco; Ulrich Thomsen; Nicholas Pinnock; Betty Gabriel; James Cromwell
- Composer: Jeff Russo
- Country of origin: United States
- Original languages: English; German
- No. of seasons: 2
- No. of episodes: 20

Production
- Executive producers: Amy Berg; Justin Marks; Bard Dorros; Keith Redmon; Morten Tyldum; Jordan Horowitz; Gary Gilbert
- Production locations: Los Angeles; Berlin
- Cinematography: Luc Montpellier; Martin Ruhe; Philipp Blaubach; Tobias Datum; Hagen Bogdanski
- Camera setup: Single-camera
- Running time: 52–60 minutes
- Production companies: Gilbert Films; Anonymous Content; Gate 34; MRC; Studio Babelsberg; Starz Originals

Original release
- Network: Starz
- Release: December 10, 2017 – February 17, 2019

Counterpart is a science fiction thriller television series starring J. K. Simmons. It was created by Justin Marks and was first broadcast on the premium cable network Starz. The series ran for 20 episodes across two seasons. It premiered on December 10, 2017, and aired its final episode on February 17, 2019.

== Premise ==
Howard Silk, a gentle, quiet office worker, has been working for a Berlin-based United Nations agency, the Office of Interchange (OI), for thirty years. His position is too low for him to be told what his work—exchanging apparently nonsensical messages—really involves. The OI oversees a checkpoint below its headquarters between parallel Earths (the "Alpha" and "Prime" worlds). The parallel Earths were created in 1987 during an experiment by East Germany when only a scientist named Yanek was on-site. The "Alpha world" Yanek met his "Prime world" counterpart, and they soon began studying how the initially identical Earths diverge.

The differences between the two worlds become more pronounced after 1996, when a flu pandemic killed hundreds of millions in the Prime world, setting back the world technologically but advancing it in life sciences. The virus was suspected of being purposely released by the Alpha world into the Prime world, which resulted in a tense cold war between the two worlds, with counterparts used as spies and sleeper agents. Silk's Alpha world continues to resemble ours, but the Prime world becomes quite different. Howard Silk Prime is a ruthless intelligence operative. Matters escalate during the series when a powerful rogue faction on Prime executes long-simmering plans to get revenge on Alpha.

== Cast and characters ==
=== Main ===
- J. K. Simmons as Howard Silk, an Interface employee at the Alpha world's Office of Interchange (OI), and as Howard Silk Prime, an accomplished agent for Section 2 (clandestine operations) of OI in the Prime world
- Olivia Williams as Emily Burton-Silk, Howard's wife in the Alpha world and an employee of Housekeeping (the counterintelligence function) at OI, and as Emily Burton, Prime Howard's ex-wife and also an employee of OI Housekeeping
- Harry Lloyd as Peter Quayle, OI Director of Strategy in the Alpha world
- Nazanin Boniadi as Clare, Baldwin's handler.
- Sara Serraiocco as Nadia Fierro/Baldwin, a mysterious assassin from the Prime world
- Ulrich Thomsen as Josef Aldrich (season 1), OI Director of Housekeeping in the Alpha world
- Nicholas Pinnock as Ian Shaw, an aggressive OI Housekeeping operative and watchdog in the Prime world, and Emily Prime's lover after her marriage broke down
- Mido Hamada as Cyrus (season 1), an OI Housekeeping operative under Aldrich
- Betty Gabriel as Naya Temple (season 2), a former FBI agent hired by the OI in the Alpha world to clean house
- James Cromwell as Yanek (season 2), the warden of Echo, an underground facility in the Prime world, the scientist from Alpha in 1987 (played by Samuel Roukin) whose inattentive moment allowed an experiment to run amok and create Prime and the single corridor connecting the two worlds

=== Recurring ===
- Ken Duken as Spencer, Clare's childhood boyfriend and infiltrator from the Prime world
- Kenneth Choi as Bob Dwyer, OI Director of Strategy in the Prime world
- Guy Burnet as Claude Lambert, the Prime ambassador to the Alpha world, later revealed to have a close personal relationship with Claude (Alpha)
- Stephen Rea as Alexander Pope (season 1), Howard Prime's mentor and an influential associate of the Indigo program
- Bernhard Forcher as Andrei, Howard Alpha's friend and Go partner and Emily Alpha's lover
- Sarah Bolger as Anna Burton-Silk, Howard and Emily Prime's daughter
- Bjorn Johnson as Heinrich, an expatriate from the Prime world and part of Howard Prime's contact network
- Lotte Verbeek as Helen Mueller ("Ringleader"), one of a trio of infiltrators from the Prime world
- Karim Saleh as Marcel, an OI Interface employee in the Alpha world
- Whoopie Van Raam as Maria ("Young Mother"), Spencer's associate who leads the Indigo operatives
- Richard Schiff as Roland Fancher, OI Director of Diplomacy and Quayle's father-in-law
- Nolan Gerard Funk as Angel Eyes, one of a trio of infiltrators from the Prime world
- Liv Lisa Fries as Greta, a barista in the Alpha world who becomes involved with Baldwin
- Jacqueline Bisset as Charlotte Burton, Emily's mother
- Christiane Paul as Mira, the head of the Indigo program's school in the Prime world, daughter of Yanek, and briefly appears as Mira (Alpha)
- Stefan Kapičić as Lieber, Ian Shaw's right-hand man
- Jacqueline Antaramian as Ava Fancher, Roland's wife
- Ingo Rademacher as Friedrich, Quayle's best friend
- Marco Khan as Raash, Howard Prime's right-hand man, a loyal and reliable operative

== Episodes ==
Season	Episodes	Originally released	
Season	Episodes	First released	Last released
1	10	December 10, 2017	April 1, 2018
2	10	December 9, 2018	February 17, 2019

=== Season 1 (2017–18) ===
No. overall	No. in season	Title	Directed by	Written by	Original release date	U.S. viewers (millions)
1	1	"The Crossing"	Morten Tyldum	Justin Marks	December 10, 2017 (Note: The pilot episode was later re-aired on January 21, 2018.)	0.394
Howard Silk is a low-level bureaucrat in a Berlin-based UN agency called the Office of Interchange, where he works in the Interface division, exchanging coded call-and-response messages with another agent. Despite his long tenure, Howard has never learned the purpose of Interface or OI. Peter Quayle, OI's Director of Strategy, denies Howard a promotion to his department, citing Howard's age and lackluster career. After work, Howard visits his comatose wife Emily, who had been struck by a car and is now in hospital. The next day, Howard is taken to a room with Quayle and Aldrich, the Director of Housekeeping. A man identical to Howard is brought in: Howard Silk (Prime). (Note: Per series creator Justin Marks, the "other" Howard is referred to as Howard Prime, and "our" Howard is referred to as Howard Alpha, or simply Howard.) Quayle explains that during the final years of the Cold War, the East Germans accidentally created a portal to a divergent parallel universe in the basement of what would become the OI building. Howard Prime explains that a female assassin from the Prime world codenamed Baldwin has crossed over with a kill list that includes Howard's wife. That night, Howard Prime impersonates Howard Alpha at Emily's hospital and ambushes Baldwin before she can harm Emily Alpha, but she escapes. Howard Prime returns to his world and visits a bar where he encounters Emily Prime - who is still alive, contrary to what he had told Howard Alpha, that she had died from cancer.
2	2	"Birds of a Feather"	Stephen Williams	Justin Marks	January 28, 2018	0.506
After Howard Prime's estranged wife tells him of a rendition order against him, he kills the contractors sent to bring him in and then meets with Alexander Pope, his mentor and an influential member of Prime OI, to discuss whether the rendition order was official or a rogue assassination attempt. Pope gets him a 36-hour visa to the Alpha side. Meanwhile, Howard Alpha has been promoted to the Analysis division, and later meets with Aldrich and Prime to discuss Baldwin. Prime tells them her real name is Nadia Fierro, and her Alpha version is a virtuoso violinist. Baldwin (Nadia Prime) meets with her handler Clare, who orders her to kill Nadia Alpha. Emily Prime is revealed to be in a relationship with Ian Shaw, a fellow operative. Baldwin goes to kill Nadia Alpha, but is unable to follow through. Alpha OI agents corner Baldwin, resulting in Nadia Alpha's death and Baldwin (Nadia Prime)'s arrest. Afterwards, Howard Alpha fumes over Nadia Alpha's unnecessary death and punches Aldrich. Emily Prime meets with Pope and declares she wants to keep the peace between both worlds. Pope answers, "I wonder when we've ever had peace" and "if there will ever come a reckoning for what they did to us".
3	3	"The Lost Art of Diplomacy"	Jennifer Getzinger	Amy Berg	February 4, 2018	0.299
Upon learning of imminent negotiations for Baldwin's return, Howard Prime visits Prime world ambassador Claude Lambert to have him stall for time while Aldrich and Howard Alpha interrogate Baldwin. Lambert dismisses Howard Prime's request, and Emily Prime and Ian cross over to question him about the Baldwin fiasco. At the negotiations between Lambert and Alpha OI Diplomacy director Roland Fancher, lingering tensions over the cause of a deadly pandemic that devastated the Prime world initially block progress. Emily Prime explains to Howard Prime that Pope had ordered his rendition, while Howard Prime reveals his source on the schism in Prime OI's Management is from the Alpha world. The negotiations wrap up, but Baldwin fails to crack and is later freed in an ambush engineered by Clare. Howard Prime realizes the negotiations were a ploy and suspects Lambert's involvement. To circumvent the revocation of his crossing privileges, Howard Prime decides to switch identities with Howard Alpha. In the Prime world, Emily Prime discovers Howard Prime's source was Emily Alpha, who had asked Howard Prime to reach out to her husband if she was harmed. At her apartment, Emily Prime is drugged by intruders, who stage the drugging to look like a self-inflicted overdose.
4	4	"Both Sides Now"	Alik Sakharov	Erin Levy	February 11, 2018	0.360
Howard Alpha and Howard Prime discuss their routines. Baldwin denies to Clare that she revealed anything to her captors. Howard Alpha crosses over to the other side and is taken to Prime's apartment by Raash, an associate of Howard Prime, who locks him in the apartment. Howard Prime arrives at Alpha OI to work, but leaves when he finds the position is drudge work. Howard Alpha discovers that Howard Prime has an estranged daughter, Anna Burton-Silk, and learns from her that Emily Prime is still alive but hospitalized due to an apparent overdose. Lambert secretly meets with Clare, relaying her superiors' dissatisfaction and orders to remove Baldwin. With Quayle in tow, Howard Prime visits an old contact, Heinrich, who reveals that both Pope and Lambert are with a faction of fanatics who have been smuggling crossers to the Alpha world for years. Among the crossers was a mole who has been placed high-up in Alpha OI's Strategy. Emily catches on that Howard is really from the Alpha world. After having sex with Baldwin, Clare sends an assassin to dispose of her, but Baldwin kills him. Howard Alpha and Emily Prime get along well, and decide to work together to aid Howard Prime. Howard Prime concludes that he must live Howard Alpha's life until Quayle can smoke out the mole.
5	5	"Shaking the Tree"	Stephen Williams	Zak Schwartz	February 18, 2018	0.416
Three infiltrators cross over from the Prime world. Clare confronts Heinrich over Howard Prime. Howard Alpha encounters Pope, who is aware that Alpha and Prime switched and attempts to sow distrust between Howard Alpha and Emily Prime; Howard Alpha informs Emily Prime, who believes Pope was behind her "overdose". They seek out a diplomatic courier linked to the fanatics and Lambert. Emily elaborates that the Prime world's pandemic was a form of flu that killed half a billion people in the mid-1990s. Prime world defector Alice (who lives with her Alpha world counterpart) explains to Quayle and Aldrich that Prime OI's Strategy implemented an unauthorized program called Indigo, which set up "the School" to train sleeper agents from childhood; Indigo was funded off-the-books by Prime OI staff who blamed Alpha OI for the pandemic. Alice also mentions that an agent codenamed Shadow may have been sent to infiltrate Alpha OI five years ago. When Howard Alpha's friend and Go partner Andrei tries to visit Emily Alpha under another name, Howard Prime breaks into his apartment and uncovers Emily Alpha's research, but discovers Andrei is only a civilian who had been having an affair with Emily. Clare gives the three infiltrators their orders, unaware that Baldwin is stalking her. Howard Alpha tries to forge a relationship with Howard Prime's daughter Anna.
6	6	"Act Like You've Been Here Before"	Jennifer Getzinger	Justin Britt-Gibson	February 25, 2018	0.429
Angel Eyes, an infiltrator, experiences Berlin's nightlife. When questioned by his compatriot, Ringleader, he reassures her that he still thinks that the people of the Alpha world are "filthy" and deserve to die. Anna discusses her father's odd behavior with her mother, Emily Prime. Ian is told of Emily and Howard Alpha's encounter with the courier and subjects him to a lie exam, which Howard Alpha "beats" because he has no knowledge of Howard Prime's activities. Emily Prime shares a Potsdam address which she gleaned from the courier with Ian. They, Howard Alpha, and a squad of agents travel there, but Pope is tipped off by the lie exam administrator and alerts the building's residents. Baldwin (Nadia Prime) attends the funeral of her other, Nadia Fierro Alpha, then strikes a bargain with Clare to finish her contract. She later develops feelings for Greta, a barista. Howard Prime confirms Emily Alpha's research consists of photocopied Alpha OI Strategy documents that had been passed to Prime OI, and asks Quayle to identify the documents' origin. When Heinrich is found dead, Howard Prime deduces that the mole is somehow getting intel directly from Quayle. While Aldrich concludes from his own investigation that Quayle is Shadow, Quayle notices the documents are from his personal files, leading him to suspect his wife, Clare.
7	7	"The Sincerest Form of Flattery"	Alik Sakharov	Gianna Sobol	March 4, 2018	0.268
In 1997 in the Prime world, Clare Fancher is taken in by the School after her parents succumb to the flu epidemic. She is ruthlessly molded into a copy of her other, and taught by supervisor Mira to hate the Alpha world for unleashing the flu virus. In 2013, Clare crosses over after her other becomes engaged to Quayle, then a Deputy Director in OI, and observes her in preparation for assuming her identity. When Clare Alpha breaks the engagement off after Quayle cheats on her, Clare Prime kills her, replaces her, and sets the marriage back on track. In the present, Quayle sends Clare on an errand and has Howard Prime search his house for evidence of her duplicity. They find a cyanide capsule in Clare's medicine cabinet, and realize Clare has been tracking Quayle's whereabouts through his phone. Since Clare is unaware she has been exposed, Quayle is forced to play innocent during his birthday party, but drinks heavily. After the guests depart, an agitated Quayle openly accuses his wife of being a spy and tries to get her to swallow the cyanide, but Clare confesses that she let the pill expire because of her baby, the first thing in her life which is truly hers.
8	8	"Love the Lie"	Alik Sakharov	Amy Berg	March 11, 2018	0.310
Ian's team raids the School. The fanatics fight to the end while Mira escapes. Howard Alpha finds the students' bodies, all of whom were poisoned to prevent their capture. While most evidence was destroyed, Ian and Emily Prime deduce the School's purpose. Howard Alpha uses Howard Prime's clout to obtain the identities of the three infiltrators, and the two arrange to meet in an Interface room. After Howard Alpha shares the intel, he and Howard Prime clash over their growing dislike for each other. Emily Alpha wakes up, but remains unresponsive, and her mother Charlotte informs Howard Prime that she'll be taking up residence in Berlin to supervise Emily's care. Baldwin kills the first of her three remaining targets. Kept handcuffed in their bedroom, Clare (Fancher/Prime) reveals some details of her infiltration and her faction's plans to husband Quayle, but dissuades him from turning her in because of how it would affect him and their infant daughter. Aldrich visits, and uses the story of how he had driven his counterpart mad to deprive Prime OI of his talents in order to convey that Quayle should surrender himself. That night, Quayle admits to Aldrich he leaked the documents, but claims that Howard Prime was the true mastermind all along.
9	9	"No Man's Land, Part One"	Stephen Williams	Erin Levy	March 18, 2018	0.342
Howard Prime eludes capture by Aldrich, as well as a clumsy attempt by Quayle to capture or kill him. Aldrich is skeptical that either Quayle or Howard Prime is Shadow. Ian and Emily Prime apprehend Kaspar, the informant who had told Pope of the Potsdam raid, before Pope's operatives can silence him. While being pressured to flip, Kaspar reveals that Pope arranged Emily Alpha's accident to end her snooping. Howard Alpha decides to return to the Alpha world. Baldwin passes various ID items and personal effects from her victims to the three infiltrators, who then take up their dead counterparts' roles in Alpha OI. Clare orders Baldwin to assassinate Howard Prime and Emily Alpha. Quayle deliberately crashes his car with Clare in the passenger seat. Howard Prime turns himself in to Aldrich to expose Clare as Shadow and warn about the infiltrators. Having smuggled weapons past security, the infiltrators massacre nearly a dozen Alpha OI staff. Aldrich and Howard Prime kill two infiltrators, but Angel Eyes manages to enter the neutral territory of the crossing before succumbing to his wounds. Aldrich refrains from pursuing him, noting "we can't touch him now".
10	10	"No Man's Land, Part Two"	Jennifer Getzinger	Gianna Sobol & Justin Britt-Gibson	April 1, 2018	0.383
Security forces monitor the wounded Angel Eyes in the neutral zone from both sides of the crossing. Quayle and Clare survive the collision with minimal injuries. Clare explains that the attack was just the beginning. The Management departments of both OIs order their staff to leave Angel Eyes untouched; Alpha OI wants Prime OI to claim him in order to demand reparations, while Prime OI wants to avoid culpability for the unsanctioned Indigo program. When Angel Eyes dies unclaimed, Alpha OI seals off the crossing. Howard Alpha begs Pope for help crossing back, but he kills Pope when the latter pulls a gun on him, and Ian uses the opportunity to have Howard put in solitary confinement. Greta rejects Baldwin after connecting her to the late Nadia Fierro, Baldwin's other. Aldrich uses Emily Alpha as bait to trap both Howard Prime and Baldwin, but Prime outwits him and bribes Baldwin into walking away from the contract killing. Baldwin then kills Aldrich to avenge Nadia. Meanwhile, Clare kills Cyrus, an OI Housekeeping operative, in her house when he confronts her. Howard Prime calls a truce with Quayle, agreeing to keep Clare's secret in exchange for Emily Alpha's safety. Later, as Howard Prime takes up Howard Alpha's life in earnest, Emily Alpha regains consciousness.

=== Season 2 (2018–19) ===
No. overall	No. in season	Title	Directed by	Written by	Original release date	U.S. viewers (millions)
11	1	"Inside Out"	Charles Martin	Erin Levy	December 9, 2018	0.248
The crossing remains closed. Alpha Management informs former FBI agent Naya Temple about the parallel worlds and hires her to work with Quayle to identify possible Prime sleepers in Alpha. With Aldrich gone, Clare assassinates both Alices. Roland tells Management that all Prime citizens in Alpha who could be found have been detained, but some are hiding. Howard Prime brings Emily home from the hospital as she tries to recover her memory after awakening, but she struggles with Howard's unexpected impatience and her own aphasia and memory flashes. After a family dinner, Quayle presses Clare for information to bolster his position against Temple. Clare leads Quayle to Edgar Brandt, but Brandt is then assassinated in OI custody. In a planned meeting, fugitive former ambassador Lambert tells Clare to activate the first sleeper cell. Howard Prime arrives home after work to find Clare visiting Emily. Quayle makes a tape detailing Clare's real identity, which he locks in his work safe. Using computer links, Management discusses the Indigo plot and Mira.
12	2	"Outside In"	Kyle Patrick Alvarez	Justin Britt-Gibson	December 16, 2018	0.206
Mira and Aldus arrive at a safehouse after the Indigo school escape, where Mira indicates that the plan must continue. Howard Alpha is interrogated after his killing of Pope, and his interrogator reveals that Management thinks Emily Alpha was involved with Indigo. Emily attends a meeting with Diplomacy, including the stranded Alpha diplomats and, after the meeting, questions the strategy of lying to them about Indigo. Mira finds and kills a member of Management, who, before his death, tells her that she will never find his communication case. Ian meets an acquaintance named Nomi. Alpha Management offers to reopen the crossing in return for Mira, and Management assigns Emily the task of locating her, promising that Howard Alpha will be freed if she does and promoting her to Deputy Director of Strategy. With Ian's help, Emily locates Aldus, who kills himself after apparently recognizing her. Among his files, she finds a ten-year-old picture of Emily Alpha in the Prime world. Mira kills two parents from Indigo who had provided Emily with information. Later Mira is told by the interrogator, an Indigo agent, that Howard Alpha has been assigned to a "black site" called Echo, as she requested.
13	3	"Something Borrowed"	Kyle Patrick Alvarez	Tom Pabst	December 23, 2018	0.176
While watching Greta from a distance, Baldwin is drugged and kidnapped. Lambert Prime tells Clare to activate the last Indigo cell, then returns to an apartment that he shares with Lambert Alpha. An Indigo agent adds a hidden tracking device inside the medications given to Howard Alpha before his transfer to Echo. Quayle has bugged Clare's shoe. Howard Prime is approached by three fellow section two agents stranded in Alpha; they captured Baldwin and are seeking Lambert. Howard Prime secretly makes a deal with Baldwin to kill Lambert but to spare the agents. Howard Alpha arrives at Echo, a secret prison that houses the counterparts of Quayle and many former OI co-workers. Yanek, who is both in charge of Echo and a prisoner, is annoyed because Howard Alpha refuses to spy on his wife. Yanek states that any man confronted with two versions of his life will have one destroy the other. Naya visits Emily Alpha, who tells her that Aldrich could not be Shadow, because Shadow is a woman. Clare finds that her childhood boyfriend Spencer is the leader of the last Indigo cell. Ian digs out the missing communication case. Emily Prime tracks Emily Alpha's former OI contact in Prime, who explains her discovery that Alpha management had developed and spread the pandemic flu in Prime, and mentions having a childhood secret hiding place in Prime. Howard Prime discusses Lambert with Quayle and Clare. Howard Alpha is beaten in Echo.
14	4	"Point of Departure"	Lukas Ettlin	Gianna Sobol	December 30, 2018	0.181
Howard Prime, Quayle and Clare must unite against a common enemy. Emily Prime continues her investigation tracking Emily Alpha's work prior to the accident that put her in a coma. Yanek probes Howard Alpha's past. Clare learns that her parents did not die of the virus, but rather were poisoned by Pope in order to obtain her for the school.
15	5	"Shadow Puppets"	Lukas Ettlin	Maria Melnik	January 6, 2019	0.244
A new revelation puts Howard Prime and Quayle in jeopardy. Life at Echo is disrupted. Clare reconnects with her past.
16	6	"Twin Cities"	Justin Marks	Justin Marks	January 20, 2019	0.267
In 1987 East Berlin, Yanek, a scientist, agrees to take clandestine photographs of a device in his workplace in order to secure his family's escape to the West. In an accident, he creates duplicate parallel worlds. Assembling a group of scientists, both Yaneks begin conducting cause-and-effect experiments between the two worlds. Yanek Alpha's home is raided by the Stasi, and his son dies during the raid. Devastated, Yanek Alpha begins regular secret crossings to Yanek Prime's home, eventually killing him. Alpha Management hands Yanek Alpha over to Prime Management as a prisoner. Yanek Alpha insists that the incident proves one side will ultimately destroy the other, if the Crossing is left open. Juma from Alpha Management creates a biological weapon, as a precaution, which, by accident or on purpose, is released into the Prime world. In the present, Mira Prime tells Yanek about Indigo, and she issues an ultimatum to Management, demanding the Crossing be closed.
17	7	"No Strings Attached"	Hanelle M. Culpepper	Maegan Houang	January 27, 2019	0.262
18	8	"In from the Cold"	Hanelle M. Culpepper	Erin Levy	February 3, 2019	0.235
Howard must both work with Emily to figure out Indigo's plans and accept the truth about his wife. Meanwhile Clare and Quayle focus on their futures.
19	9	"You to You"	Charlotte Brändström	Gianna Sobol	February 10, 2019	0.207
20	10	"Better Angels"	Charlotte Brändström	Maegan Houang & Justin Marks	February 17, 2019	0.260
The threat of Mira causes some unexpected team-ups.

== Production ==
The series was ordered in April 2015 with J. K. Simmons announced to star. Production began in December 2016 in Los Angeles. The series would also be filmed in additional locations across the U.S. and Europe in 2017, including Berlin, where the series is set, and in Potsdam at Babelsberg Studio, which co-produced the series. Amy Berg served as showrunner, executive producer, and writer for the first season, but departed before season two. While the reasons for her departure were never publicly stated, Berg implied it was due to conflicts with creator Marks who wanted full control of the series and to be the sole showrunner. Production began on the second season in February 2018 in Berlin. After Starz canceled the series after two seasons, the series' production company, Media Rights Capital, sought another home for the show; however, the effort was not successful. Starz COO Jeffrey Hirsch commented on the cancellation, saying Counterpart was "a very male show" and that "we had picked that show up and made a two-season commitment before we'd honed in on this premium female strategy".

== Reception ==
=== Critical response ===
Counterpart was well received by critics. The first season has a 100% approval rating on Rotten Tomatoes with an average rating of 8.4 out of 10 based on 49 reviews. The site's critical consensus reads, "Tense and gripping, Counterpart is an absorbing thrill-fest led by J. K. Simmons' multi-faceted dual lead performance." On Metacritic, the first season has a score of 76 out of 100 based on 15 critics.

The second season also received positive reviews. On Rotten Tomatoes, it has a 100% approval rating with an average rating 8 out of 10 based on 23 reviews. The site's critical consensus reads, "Double the J.K. Simmons brings double the aplomb in the second season of Counterpart, which finds time to deliver relevant societal critiques while deepening its labyrinthine lore." On Metacritic, it has a score of 75 out of 100 based on seven critics. Alan Sepinwall of Rolling Stone was less favorable with the second season and noted how the series had become too convoluted and difficult to follow.

=== Ratings ===
==== Season 1 ====
Viewership and ratings per episode of Counterpart
No.	Title	Air date	Rating (18–49)	Viewers (millions)	DVR viewers (millions)	Total viewers (millions)
1	"The Crossing"	December 10, 2017	0.1	0.394	—N/a	—N/a
2	"Birds of a Feather"	January 28, 2018	0.1	0.506	0.510	1.016
3	"The Lost Art of Diplomacy"	February 4, 2018	0.1	0.299	0.532	0.831
4	"Both Sides Now"	February 11, 2018	0.1	0.360	0.484	0.844
5	"Shaking the Tree"	February 18, 2018	0.1	0.416	—N/a	—N/a
6	"Act Like You've Been Here Before"	February 25, 2018	0.1	0.429	—N/a	—N/a
7	"The Sincerest Form of Flattery"	March 4, 2018	0.1	0.268	0.485	0.753
8	"Love the Lie"	March 11, 2018	0.1	0.310	0.344	0.654
9	"No Man's Land, Part One"	March 18, 2018	0.1	0.342	0.333	0.675
10	"No Man's Land, Part Two"	April 1, 2018	0.1	0.383	0.364	0.747

==== Season 2 ====
Viewership and ratings per episode of Counterpart
No.	Title	Air date	Rating (18–49)	Viewers (millions)	DVR viewers (millions)	Total viewers (millions)
1	"Inside Out"	December 9, 2018	0.04	0.248	0.260	0.508
2	"Outside In"	December 16, 2018	0.02	0.206	0.230	0.436
3	"Something Borrowed"	December 23, 2018	0.03	0.176	0.170	0.346
4	"Point of Departure"	December 30, 2018	0.02	0.181	0.248	0.429
5	"Shadow Puppets"	January 6, 2019	0.04	0.244	0.173	0.417
6	"Twin Cities"	January 20, 2019	0.08	0.267	0.197	0.464
7	"No Strings Attached"	January 27, 2019	0.05	0.262	0.173	0.436
8	"In from the Cold"	February 3, 2019	0.07	0.235	0.199	0.434
9	"You to You"	February 10, 2019	0.06	0.207	0.196	0.403
10	"Better Angels"	February 17, 2019	0.07	0.260	0.138	0.398

=== Accolades ===
Year	Award	Category	Nominee(s)	Result	Ref.
2018	Primetime Creative Arts Emmy Awards	Outstanding Main Title Design	Karin Fong, creative director; Jake Ferguson, lead designer/animator; Felipe Carvalho, designer; Nathan Lee, designer; Kiyoon Nam, animator; Zach Kilroy, editor	Won	
2018	TCA Awards	Outstanding New Program	Counterpart	Nominated	
2019	Satellite Awards	Best Actor in a Drama / Genre Series	J. K. Simmons	Nominated	
2019	Saturn Awards	Best Science Fiction Television Series	Counterpart	Nominated	

== Home media ==
The first season was released on Blu-ray and DVD on July 31, 2018, in region 1. The set includes all 10 episodes plus two behind-the-scenes featurettes. The second season was released on DVD only on July 23, 2019.
