= The Words of My Father =

2001 film

- Directed by: Francesca Comencini
- Written by: Francesca Comencini; Francesco Bruni; Richard Nataf
- Produced by: Donatella Botti; Serge Lalou
- Starring: Fabrizio Rongione
- Cinematography: Luca Bigazzi
- Edited by: Francesca Calvelli
- Music by: Ludovico Einaudi
- Release date: May 2001
- Running time: 85 minutes
- Country: Italy
- Language: Italian

The Words of My Father (Italian: Le parole di mio padre) is a 2001 Italian drama film directed by Francesca Comencini. It was screened in the Un Certain Regard section at the 2001 Cannes Film Festival.

== Cast ==
- Fabrizio Rongione - Zeno Cosini
- Chiara Mastroianni - Ada
- Mimmo Calopresti - Giovanni Malfenti
- Claudia Coli - Alberta
- Viola Graziosi - Augusta
- Toni Bertorelli - Zeno's father
- Camille Dugay Comencini - Anna
