= Maria Chiara Giannetta =

Italian actress (born 1992)

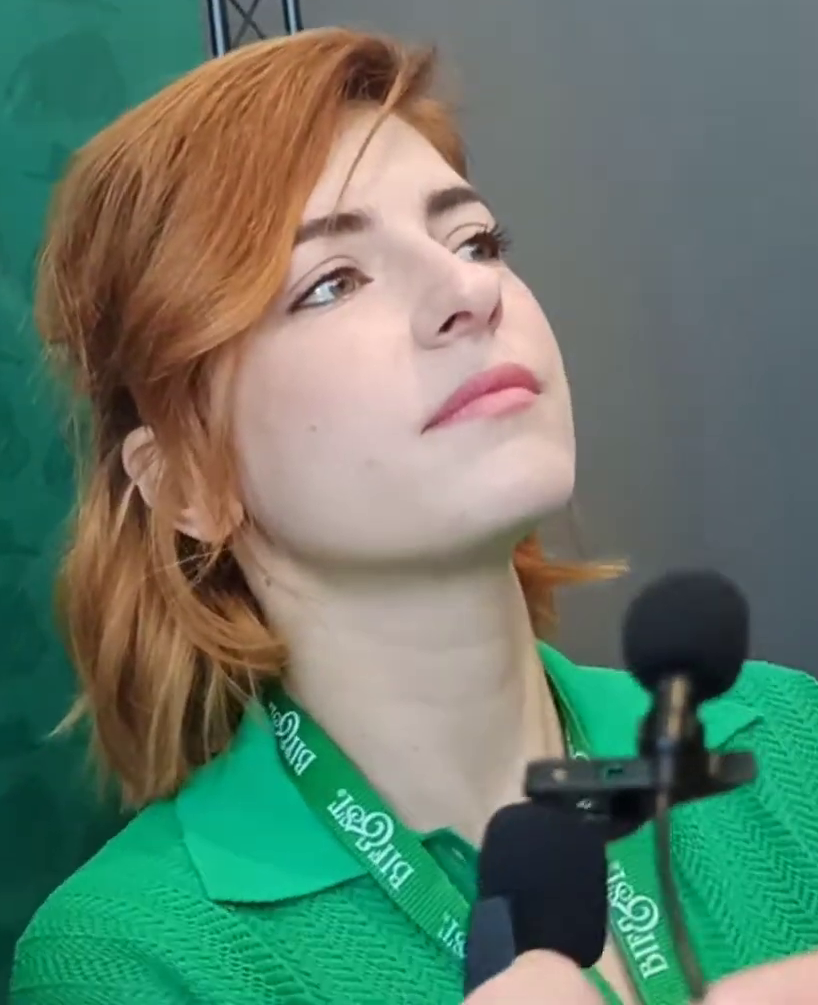
- Giannetta at the 2022 Bari International Film Festival
- Born: 20 May 1992 (age 34); Foggia, Italy
- Occupation: Actress

Maria Chiara Giannetta (born 20 May 1992) is an Italian actress. She is best known for her roles in the Italian TV series Don Matteo and Blanca.

== Early life and education ==
At the age of 10 Giannetta took part in her first theatrical performance, albeit at an amateur level, in Sant'Agata di Puglia, where she spent her childhood. She then began to attend theatre workshops.

She began studying acting at the Teatro dei Limoni in Foggia and, at the age of 19, entered the Experimental Center of Cinematography in Rome.

== Career ==
In 2014 Giannetta played a small role in the twenty-fifth episode of the ninth season of the series Don Matteo. In 2016 she appeared in the miniseries Baciato dal sole, in the role of Angela. The same year she made her film debut with Worldly Girl, directed by Marco Danieli, in the role of Loretta.

In 2017 she played Mariella Santorini in the fourth season of the series Un passo dal cielo and joined the cast of the fourth season of the series Che Dio ci aiuti, in the role of Asia.

In 2018, from the eleventh season of Don Matteo and onwards, she was chosen to play the Carabinieri captain Anna Olivieri, a role for the first time in the series assigned to a woman. The same year she played in two films, Ricordi?, directed by Valerio Mieli, and Tafanos, directed by Riccardo Paoletti.

In 2019 she played Elena in the film Mollami, directed by Matteo Gentiloni, and Alice in Bentornato Presidente, directed by Giancarlo Fontana and Giuseppe G. Stasi. Since 2021 she has taken part in the series Buongiorno, mamma!

In 2021 Giannetta became lead actress in a TV series for the first time: in Blanca, an Italian series based on the novels by Patrizia Rinaldi. She plays Blanca Ferrando, a blind young woman who becomes a police consultant. For this role, she was awarded the 2022 Nastro d'Argento for Great Series (Grandi Serie) as best lead actress.

== Filmography ==
=== Film ===
Year	Title	Role(s)	Notes
2016	Worldly Girl	Loretta	
2016	Fusa	Federica	Short film
2018	Tafanos	Christine	
2019	Mollami	Elena	
2019	Welcome Back Mr. President!	Agent De Nicola	
2025	Madly	Scheggia	

=== Television ===
Year	Title	Role(s)	Notes
2014–2024	Don Matteo	Anna Olivieri	Main role (season 11-14); guest star (season 9 episode 25)
2016	Baciato dal sole	Angela	Miniseries
2016	L'allieva	Giulia Valenti	Episode: "L'allieva"
2017	Un passo dal cielo	Mariella Santorini	Recurring role (season 4)
2017–2019	Che Dio ci aiuti	Asia	6 episodes
2021–2023	Buongiorno, mamma!	Anna Della Rosa	Main role
2021–present	Blanca	Blanca Ferrando	Lead role
2025	Hotel Costiera	Adele	Main role

=== Music videos ===
Year	Title	Artist(s)	Notes
2020	"Sembro matto"	Max Pezzali	

== Awards ==
- 2022 – Nastro d'argento per le Grandi Serie for her lead role in Blanca
- 2022 – Telegatto for her role in Don Matteo
