= Blanca (TV series) =

Italian television series

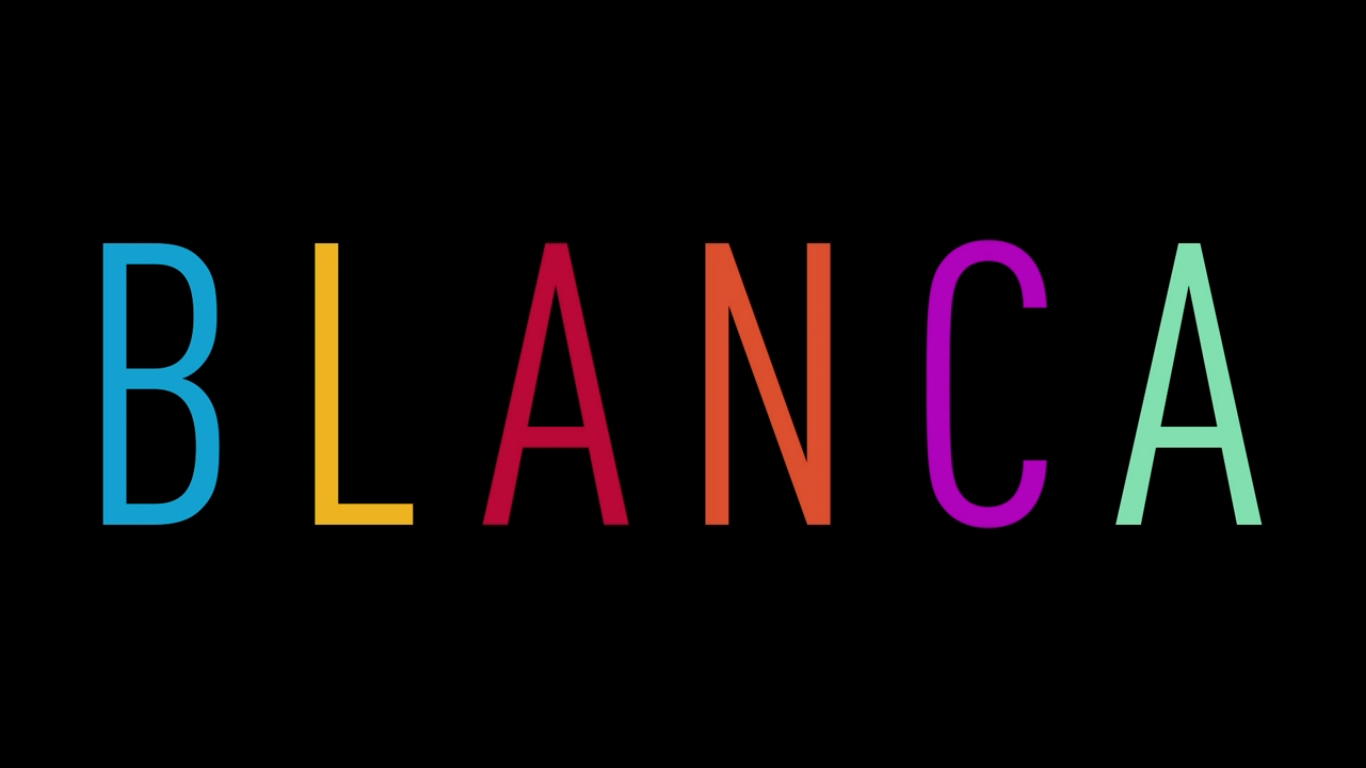
- Italian: Blanca
- Genre: Drama; Police procedural
- Created by: Francesco Arlanch, Mario Ruggeri
- Based on: Blanca by Patrizia Rinaldi
- Directed by: Jan Maria Michelini, Giacomo Martelli
- Starring: Maria Chiara Giannetta; Giuseppe Zeno; Enzo Paci; Pierpaolo Spollon; Antonio Zavattieri; Gualtiero Burzi; Federica Cacciola; Sara Ciocca; Ugo Dighero; Michela Cescon; Stefano Dionisi; Chiara Baschetti
- Country of origin: Italy
- Original language: Italian
- No. of seasons: 3
- No. of episodes: 18

Production
- Running time: 50 min
- Production company: Lux Vide

Original release
- Network: Rai 1
- Release: November 22, 2021 – present

Blanca is an Italian police procedural drama television series, which was broadcast on Rai 1 from 22 November 2021. It is based on the eponymous book series by Patrizia Rinaldi, first published in 2009. The TV series is set in Genoa and stars Maria Chiara Giannetta as the titular character: a blind intern aspiring to become a consultant profiler at the fictitious San Teodoro police station. Co-stars are Giuseppe Zeno as her mentor Michele, a detective and Enzo Paci as Mauro, the Deputy Commissioner. The first season comprises 12 single episodes or six double-length episodes. Each double-length episode details a major story arc where Blanca assists in resolving a crime. The series also follows Blanca's personal life, how she became blind, and her older sister's murder. The second season, also with 12 single episodes or six double-length episodes, began broadcast on Rai 1, in Italy, from 5 October 2023. For this season Blanca is promoted to police consultant; she deals with a bomber targeting police and the return of Sebastiano (Pierpaolo Spollon) in her life.

== Premise ==
Blanca became blind at twelve, after witnessing a fire in which her older sister Beatrice died. Blanca testified that Beatrice's boyfriend, Sebastiano, had run off just before the fire. 15 years later, Blanca is decoding audio files for court cases before returning to Genoa to work as an intern police consultant. Her uncle Alberto disapproves but allows her to stay for six months. Blanca is assisted by Linneo, her guide dog, and by her best friend Stella. While overcoming work-related challenges, she assists Michele with criminal investigations using her heightened non-visual senses. Blanca considers developing a romantic relationship with Michele, but shifts her focus to Nanni. However, Nanni is secretly Sebastiano, who is stalking her, eventually imprisons and tortures her in revenge for her incriminating testimony.

== Cast ==
- Maria Chiara Giannetta as Blanca Ferrando: blind woman (since 12 years old), intern police consultant, previously court transcriber of sound files (décodage). Beatrice's younger sister, Leone's second daughter, Alberto's niece. Her guide dog is Linneo. Promoted to police consultant, exonerates Sebastiano of any maltreatment.
  - Roberta Volponi as Blanca Ferrando: young girl.
- Giuseppe Zeno as Michele Liguori: San Teodoro police detective inspector, noble descendant (as Michelangelo Agilulfo dei conti Liguori), Blanca's mentor, Mauro's subordinate.
  - Giovannino Esposito as Michele Liguori: young boy.
- Enzo Paci as Mauro Bacigalupo: San Teodoro police Deputy Commissioner, bureaucratic, wants straightforward solutions, Michele's superior.
- Pierpaolo Spollon as Nanni Busalla (née Sebastiano Russo): poses as a restaurant cook and former sailor. Actually, Beatrice's ex-boyfriend – imprisoned for her murder. He blames Blanca's testimony for his conviction. Sebastiano supposedly died at sea, however, he assumed the real drowned cook Nanni's identity. As Nanni, he becomes Blanca's lover but spies on her, then drugs and tortures her. At his new trial, Blanca denies any maltreatment by Sebastiano, he is freed.
  - Simone Fumagalli as Sebastiano Russo: Beatrice's teen boyfriend.
- Antonio Zavatteri as Alberto Repetto: Beatrice and Blanca's uncle, magistrate, previously prosecutor. Revealed to be Beatrice's killer and framed Sebastiano; he is killed by Michele to protect Blanca.
- Gualtiero Burzi as Nello Carità: San Teodoro police officer, works for Mauro and Michele.
- Federica Cacciola as Stella Musso: beautician, Blanca's best friend, encourages Blanca to develop personal relationships: first with Michele and then with Nanni.
- Sara Ciocca as Lucia Ottonello: young teen, school student, Margherita Canepa (dead) and Gianni Ottonello's daughter, becomes Blanca's friend. After being abandoned by Gianni, Blanca calls in child protection services, which transfers her to a convent school-orphanage.
- Ugo Dighero as Leone Ferrando: Blanca and Beatrice's father, supports Blanca while dealing with her blindness.
- Michela Cescon as Nadia Repetto/Elena: Blanca's long-estranged mother, Alberto's sister. Pretends to be a housekeeper to work for Blanca. She is the police bomber's lover.
- Isabella Mottinelli as Beatrice "Bea" Ferrando: Blanca's 16-year-old sister, Leone's daughter, died in fire.
- Stefano Dionisi as Raffaele Randi / "Polibomber": the police's main enemy, sets off numerous bombs injuring and killing police.

=== Season 1 additional cast ===
- Fiorenza Pieri as Marinella Fabbri: journalist, Michele's sometime girlfriend, Gabriele's mother.
- Rocco Gottlieb as Gabriele: Marinella's young teen son.
- Sandra Ceccarelli as Timperi: high-priced lawyer, Michele's long-estranged mother.

=== Season 2 additional cast ===
- Chiara Baschetti as Veronica Alberici: a lawyer who works at Timperi's firm, Michele's childhood friend.
- Raffaele Esposito as Paolo Sivori: head of Special Operations Division (DIGOS), leads Crisis Unit set up to solve "Polibomber" case.
- Carlo Sciaccaluga as Ivan Scarabotti: young police officer, target of Nello's jokes.

== Production ==
Initially the titular role of Blanca was offered to Giulia Michelini, but she was replaced by Maria Chiara Giannetta (also in Don Matteo and Buongiorno, mamma!). Filming primarily took place in the northern Italian region of Liguria, mostly in its capital city of Genoa. Other locations used were Monte Argentario (Tuscany) and Formello (Lazio).

== Episode guide ==
No.	Title	Directed by	Written by	Original release date
1	"Without Eyes Part 1" (Senza Occhi Parte Uno)	Jan Michelini	Patrizia Rinaldi, Francesco Arlanch, Mario Ruggeri	22 November 2021
Blanca and Linneo enter San Teodoro Police Station. Nello tells her to wait; she sits next to Margherita. Margherita receives a call; walks out. Blanca follows but loses her. Blanca meets Michele, who introduces her to Mauro. Mauro complains to Michele about having to train Blanca. Back in her flat, Blanca unpacks. She remembers dancing while Beatrice played guitar. Alberto calls: too dangerous to work for the police. Overnight, Margherita's running while on the phone to emergency: someone's chasing her. She is stabbed to death. Michele shows Blanca to her desk. She feels his face to establish visualisation. Nello tells Michele that Margherita's dead. She's been found under a bridge. Michele, Mauro and Nello attend the corpse – her eyes are gouged out. When they return, Blanca tells them about her encounter with Margherita, and they listen to the emergency call. Michele gives Margherita's background. Nello: Gianna's here and has a criminal record. Blanca listens to the call again; Lucia enters and they exchange information. Mauro deduces Gianni killed Margherita due to his jealousy over her higher income and association with dockworkers. Blanca to Mauro: Margherita did not die under the bridge. Mauro disbelieves her. Michele to Blanca: Gianna killed his wife. Blanca visits Gianni's flat, he protests his innocence. Lucia tells Blanca: Margherita was seeing another man. Stella tells Blanca to ask Michele for a date. Someone watches as Blanca enjoys standing in the rain. Michele researches other women killed near the docks.
2	"Without Eyes Part 2" (Senza Occhi Parte Due)	Jan Michelini	Patrizia Rinaldi, Francesco Arlanch, Mario Ruggeri	22 November 2021
Stella to Blanca: find out if Michele's single. Nanni meets Blanca; berates her for a negative food review. Lucia throws a rock through Blanca's window; she's upset Gianni's been arrested. Blanca consoles Lucia: keep hope; invites her to stay. Blanca explains that Beatrice died. Michele has a girlfriend. Blanca's father visits: concerned about her hunting a killer. Michele and Nello install bugs inside the ship; later, he asks Blanca to listen in when the captain talks to his ex-wife. Michele enters and is found by the ship's security guard. Mauro is annoyed that Michele entered without getting his permission and has him apologise to the captain. Blanca finds Andrea's cabin, he uses vanilla scented incense. Nanni returns, apologises to Blanca, and hands her a new meal to review. Blanca to Michele: Andrea is a killer but she will meet him tonight. Michele drives her to the venue. Andrea to Blanca: Margherita loved books and poetry. Andrea takes Blanca outside, where she hails a taxi. Upon entering her flat, she senses someone else. Andrea stalks her and tries to kill her. Michele rescues her and arrests Andrea. Andrea confesses to four murders but not Margherita. Margherita was killed by Andrea's mother, Rita.
3	"The Ghosts Part 1" (Fantasmi Parte Uno)	Jan Michelini	Patrizia Rinaldi, Francesco Arlanch, Mario Ruggeri	29 November 2021
Camilo, Arianna and Bartelomeo race on scooters through the streets. They crash into cafe patrons who chase them. They hide in Michele's uncle Edoardo's home. Michele and Nello find Camilo's corpse there. Carmine confronts Blanca about Sebastiano's suicide. She relives early hospitalisation, learning of Beatrice's death and becoming totally blind. Arianna and Bartelomeo lie about Camilo. Michele has flashbacks of his father's suicide. Edoardo tells Michele that ghosts hid Camilo's wallet. Blanca and Linneo find Arianna hiding; she maintains her story. Michele does not mention ghosts or finding Camilo's wallet. Mauro tells Michele and Blanca that: youths were drug couriers, surveilled by the Drug Squad's Achilli and Stefania. Blanca tells Stella about Carmine. Lucia arrives; father cannot pay for guitar lessons. Carmine complains on TV about Blanca working for the police. Mauro bars Blanca from interviews. Achilli and Mauro accuse Arianna and Bartelomeo of being dealers. They sold methadone for drug addict Nicola; encountered Edoardo, who chased them off. Camilo tripped and fell. Mauro and Nello question Edoardo, who describes a ghost with red eyes. Blanca determines it was a smoker. Arianna wants Bartelomeo to tell the police the truth. Arianna phones Blanca to meet up, where she will explain what really happened.
4	"The Ghosts Part 2" (Fantasmi Parte Due)	Jan Michelini	Patrizia Rinaldi, Francesco Arlanch, Mario Ruggeri	29 November 2021
Michele asks Timperi to represent Edoardo as lawyer: she refuses. Blanca finds comatose Arianna at their meeting place: looks like an overdose. Mauro to Michele: find Nicola. Someone installs bugs inside Blanca's flat. Blanca visits Sebastiano's gravesite. Carmine asks her to re-investigate Beatrice's murder. Blanca recalls Sebastiano asking Beatrice for sex but Beatrice refused. Michele and his former lover Stefania catch Nicola. He denies selling heroin to Arianna. Blanca invites Michele to dinner and asks Nanni to cook. Michele stands up Blanca; Alberto arrives with Beatrice's casefile. Alberto: Sebastiano's death was accidental. Bartelomeo burns evidence of drug sales. Blanca to Lucia: found your dad a job with Nanni. Mauro calls a press conference, Blanca hears caller's voice. Michele and Blanca visit Arianna's bedside to talk to Bartelomeo. Bartelomeo tells her what really happened at Edoardo's. Bartelomeo asks three dealers, Achilli and Stefania, to meet at Edoardo's. Michele and Blance covertly attend; Blanca identifies Achilli, phone caller and Stefania. Michele moves in, Blanca phones for assistance and then confronts Achilli and Stafania. Michelle to Edoardo: ghosts were corrupt police. Blanca meets Marinella. Someone in Blanca's flat moves her things around. Outside, Blanca to Carmine: Sebastiano was guilty.
5	"I Dance Alone Part 1" (Io ballo da sola Parte Uno)	Jan Michelini	Patrizia Rinaldi, Francesco Arlanch, Mario Ruggeri	6 December 2021
Marinella's son Gabriele's kidnapped. Lucia avoids school camp. Mauro to Marinella: Gabriele wondered off. From listening to Gabriele's call, Blanca: he was kidnapped. Blanca's stalker observes her. She calls Nanni to clean up her cut foot. CCTV shows Vittorio forcing Gabriele into a car. Vittorio's father Marzio and mother Cleleia do not know Vittorio's whereabouts. Nello bugs their home. Marinella riles about using Blanca. Flashback: Blanca walks Genoa streets using her white cane. Present: Marzio's secretary Debora wants him to sign documents. Blanca hears Cleleia talking to kidnapper Italo. Police arrest Marzio and Cleleia. Italo assaults Vittorio and then calls Cleleia. Kidnapper2 feeds Gabriele and Vittorio. Cleleia to Italo: police know about kidnapping. Italo to kidnapper2: kill Gabriele; he saw my face. Lucia visits Blanca at police station. Marzio: Italo warned us not to contact police. Debora advises Marzio: use your slush fund for ransom. Gianni fired by Nanni: unreliable. Gianni's drinking again; Lucia's afraid to leave him alone. Cleleia warns Italo not to harm hostages. Flashback: Leone introduces Linneo. Italo calls; Blanca recognises motorcycle idling. Cleleia phones kidnapper2: Italo's followed by police. Kidnapper2 puts hostages in van, warns Italo. Italo and kidnapper2 shoot police car injuring Linneo and escape.
6	"I Dance Alone Part 2" (Io ballo da sola Parte Due)	Jan Michelini	Patrizia Rinaldi, Francesco Arlanch, Mario Ruggeri	6 December 2021
Vet to Blanca: operated on Linneo; now wait. Blanca to Marinella: Gabriele lives. Michele sees Nanni with Blanca. Michele: kidnappers were warned. Italo fumes at Cleleia. Italo threatens Gabriele but Vittorio volunteers to have his ear cut. Lucia consoles Blanca. Blanca remembers Cleleia's ringtone. Marzio receives envelope with Vittorio's ear. Marzio to Cleleia: pay ransom; do not tell police. Blanca: Cleleia has another phone. Michele calls from kidnapper's phone. Cleleia hired Italo to kidnap Vittorio; wanted Marzios money to pay Vittorio's debts. Marzio's having affair with Debora. Kidnapper2 fights Italo; Italo's killed. Cleleia phones kidnapper2: we have ransom. Kidnapper2: Italo's dead, all will die. Gabriele stole Vittorio's digital camera, which Vittorio uses to livestream. Nello recognises location. Kidnapper2 turns on gas cylinders. Police surround location, kidnapper2 threatens to kill hostages. Blanca approaches with white cane. Police fire at kidnapper2 but Blanca pushes him way. Once inside she smells gas cylinders. Blanca and Gabriele convince kidnapper2 to give up. Marinella arrives to collect Gabriele. Marzio apologises to Vittorio for not immediately paying ransom. Blanca sees Lucia off on her school camp. Blanca visits Linneo. Marinella asks Michele to move in but he refuses. Blanca and Nanni socialise; stalker's cameras are unattended.
7	"Deep Blue Part 1" (Blu profondo Parte Uno)	Giacomo Martelli	Francesco Arlanch, Mario Ruggeri, Giulia Cavazza	13 December 2021
Scuba diver approaches sunken Nazi U-boat. Vet to Blanca: Linneo too injured for guide work; leave dog with handler. Alberto and Savelli ask Blanca to investigate Nazi paraphernalia sellers. She joins diving centre owned by father Claudio, daughter Fulvia and son Bernardo. Police suspect Fulvia's fiancé Lorenzo. Blanca enjoys her dive. Lorenzo sinks underwater as another diver swims away. Michele: split from Marinella. Blanca notices an odd smell near Lorenzo's corpse. Blanca learns Fulvia's pregnant. Flashback: Leone bans Beatrice from seeing Sebastiano. Present: Lucia asks to stay with Blanca while Gianni is away. Lorenzo put to sleep by CO_{2} in tanks. He was trapped underwater; revived and cut his own hand off but died from blood loss. Bernardo traffics Nazi goods. Michele and Nello see Carolina run from Lorenzo's flat. Lorenzo had hidden money. At diving centre Blanca finds caustic soda baths to clean Nazi items; also rectangular packages. Fulvia visits police station, learns Blanca watched diving centre. Mauro to Fulvia: Lorenzo had another woman; he trafficked Nazi items. Flashback: Beatrice defies Leone's orders, rides with Sebastiano on motorcycle. Present: Lucia enters Blanca's flat; stalker's inside. Nello finds Carolina. Carolina: no longer junkie, came to collect money.
8	"Deep Blue Part 2" (Blu profondo Parte Due)	Giacomo Martelli	Francesco Arlanch, Mario Ruggeri, Giulia Cavazza	13 December 2021
Bernardo to Camorra buyer: too many customers at centre; deliver more tomorrow. Blanca to Fulvia: help find Lorenzo's killer. Fulvia takes Blanca to Lorenzo's dive site. Bernardo approaches in boat. Fulvia radios Blanca: found U-boat. Bernardo holds gun on Blanca but Fulvia surfaces. Police investigate U-boat; find paraphernalia and TNT, which Camorra wants. Dive centre closed; Claudio to Fulvia: this is Lorenzo's fault. Bernardo delivers TNT to Camorra. Mauro: find Lorenzo's accomplices. Blanca and Lucia update Stella on Blanca's love life. Nello: Carolina found in Milan. Fulvia asks Bernardo about smuggling. Her car's rammed off road: her baby dies. Linneo's escaped into woods. Nanni sees Michele comforting Blanca. Bernardo begs comatose Fulvia to forgive him. Marinella to Michele: do not hurt Blanca. Carolina: having an affair with Lorenzo. Confronted by Fulvia; Carolina left for Milan before collision. Police arrest Bernardo for selling Nazi goods and TNT. Bernardo denies killing Lorenzo or causing Fulvia's collision. Police find Camorra's TNT. Flashback: Blanca sees Beatrice's bruises but is warned off. Present: Blanca takes Lucia home; rebukes Gianni for neglecting Lucia. Carolina killed Lorenzo. Gianni takes Lucia's guitar away. Blanca apologises to Nanni; he kisses her. Linneo returns home. Nanni revealed as stalker.
9	"Stains Part 1" (Macchie Parte Uno)	Giacomo Martelli	Patrizia Rinaldi, Francesco Arlanch, Mario Ruggeri	20 December 2021
Caterina to professor Balduzzi: cannot turn on camera; not presentable. Timperi argues with Caterina. Nanni stalks Blanca. Nanni drugs Blanca's coffee. Caterina's boyfriend Valerio reports her missing. Mauro: not our problem. Blanca and Valerio go to Caterina's father Annibale. Annibale: Caterina paid his gambling debts. In Caterina's room Blanca smells petrol-infused plastic. Valerio finds another address. Concierge complains of unexplained visitors, they find Caterina's corpse. Michele: killed two days ago. Annibale: Caterina would not dress like a prostitute. Picoil CEO Giorgio owned flat. Giorgio and Timperi arrive; make statement. Blanca feels dizzy. Giorgio: Caterina's flat to work as lab researcher. Flashback: Michele sees Timperi and Giorgio passionately kissing. Present: Blanca believes Giorgio not murderer; has firm, steady voice. Timperi to Giorgio: go to wife, let me handle police. Nanni watches: Lucia refuses to tell Blanca about missing guitar. Blanca to Stella: want to go to music concert. Nanni has concert tickets, drugs Blanca's juice. Blanca and Valerio talk to Balduzzi about Caterina. Balduzzi warns Timperi that Blanca suspects their involvement. Blanca: Caterina cleaned for Cargo Genua. Same company fired Annibale. Caterina looking for evidence to exonerate Annibale. Nello: Caterina worked as camgirl. Bianca witnesses Michele picking a fight with Giorgio.
10	"Stains Part 2" (Machie Parte Due)	Giacomo Martelli	Patrizia Rinaldi, Francesco Arlanch, Mario Ruggeri	20 December 2021
Blanca and Stella discuss concert date with Nanni but Blanca does not feel well. Nanni arrives; happy to forgo concert. Nanni helps prepare meal; drugs Blanca's tea. Internal Affairs investigates Michele's fracas with Giorgio. Blanca: Michele pushed Giorgio first. Michele's taken off Caterina's case. Blanca works with Mauro. Flashback: Michele finds father's corpse: suicide by hanging. Present: Blanca and Mauro update Valerio and Annibale. Blanca talks to Caterina's fellow cleaners. They describe Cargo Genua's accountant Emilio, who wore a beret. Emilio admits to pursuing relationship. Caterina seduced Fornari to obtain cargo records. Blanca to Giorgio: your phone's hacked. Nanni visits Blanca's flat while she showers. Guitar teacher to Blanca: Lucia's missed lessons. Lucia admits Gianni broke her guitar. Blanca agrees to meet Giorgio, while Nello and Mauro listen. Giorgio: Picoil transfers poisons via old cargo ships, which sink. Balduzzi's on Picoil's payroll. Caterina's investigations into Balduzzi found out. Blanca figures: Caterina was killed by Valerio to prevent outing Balduzzi's corruption: result in Valerio losing job. Timperi to Michele: father's suicide not her fault. Flashback: Michele tells father about Timperi kissing Giorgio. Blanca gives Lucia her guitar. Blanca feels listless. Nanni's built sound-proof room with metal chair and shackles.
11	"Going Back Home Part 1" (Tornando a casa Parte Uno)	Giacomo Martelli	Patrizia Rinaldi, Francesco Arlanch, Mario Ruggeri	21 December 2021
Blanca's sleeping with Nanni when Carmine calls. Nanni continues drugging Blanca. Carmine's killed in his room. Nello: looks like suicide. Carmine's wife: separated, he was obsessed with Sebastiano's innocence. Flashback: Blanca warns Beatrice not to visit Sebastiano. Present: Mauro refuses to consider Carmine's murder. Blanca listens to CCTV footage: footsteps after shooting. Drugging affects Blanca's senses; she falls downstairs. Nanni visits in hospital; he recognises Alberto and leaves. Doctor: inner ear malfunction caused by infections, medications or Ménière's disease. Could result in total deafness. Flashback: Roberto drives nieces to beach. Present: Michele: no sign of Carmine's call. Nanni: did not hear call. Lucia to Blanca: help with conservatorium registration. Blanca fears stairs. Nanni takes Lucia to registration. Flashback: Leone trains Blanca to navigate Genoa streets. Present: Nanni refuses to take Blanca to Carmine's. Blanca takes Lucia to read Carmine's research to Blanca: white four-wheel drive; witness Dominico not officially recorded. Lucia finds Beatrice's earring. Carmine's wife: earring from Beatrice's other man. Mauro does not believe Blanca; she faints. Mauro sends Blanca home: internship ends. Blanca tells Nanni: never noticed Beatrice's other man. Blanca to Nanni: Carmine had no photos of Sebastiano. She starts phoning Michele when Nanni knocks her out.
12	"Going Back Home Part 2" (Tornando a casa Parte Due)	Giacomo Martelli	Patrizia Rinaldi, Francesco Arlanch, Mario Ruggeri	21 December 2021
Nanni ties Blanca, while Linneo's trapped on balcony. Lucia arrives but no answer; she reports Blanca missing to police. Michele finds blood spatters; releases Linneo. Blanca's strapped into iron chair. Nello to Michele: Carmine did phone Blanca. Michele: only Nanni could have deleted her phone. Police enter Nanni's flat, find surveillance of Blanca, drugs and real Nanni's id. Nanni tells Blanca he's Sebastiano and assumed Nanni's life after he drowned. Flashback: Carmine sees Sebastiano leave Blanca's flat. Present: Sebastiano: did not kill Carmine. Blanca asks for forgiveness; she was only 12. Sebastiano leaves her tied. Ganni to Lucia: forget Blanca, she dumped you because you are shit. Sebastiano sees Blanca's room flooding with stormwater. Sebastiano phones Michele: Blanca's location. Chair falls over, she's underwater. Michele rescues Blanca. Mauro apologises for not believing Blanca. Alberto: will catch Sebastiano. Blanca: Sebastiano not enough time to kill Carmine. Michele and Blanca interview Dominico: he saw white car. Blanca: Alberto drove such a car. Nello: Sebastiano at Punta Crena. Alberto chases Sebastiano; Michele and Blanca arrive. Blanca encounters Alberto who eventually confesses to killing Beatrice but demeans Blanca. Sebastiano saves Blanca being pushed off. Michele shoots Alberto, who falls off cliff; arrests Sebastiano.
