= The Ignorant Angels =

2022 Italian television series

- Italian poster
- Italian: Le Fate Ignoranti
- Genre: Drama; Romance
- Created by: Ferzan Özpetek; Gianni Romoli
- Written by: Ferzan Özpetek; Gianni Romoli; Carlotta Corradi; Massimo Bacchini
- Directed by: Ferzan Özpetek; Gianluca Mazzella
- Starring: Cristiana Capotondi; Eduardo Scarpetta; Serra Yılmaz; Ambra Angiolini; Anna Ferzetti; Paola Minaccioni; Burak Deniz; Filippo Scicchitano; Edoardo Purgatori; Carla Signoris; Edoardo Siravo; Lilith Primavera; Luca Argentero
- Composer: Pasquale Catalano
- Country of origin: Italy
- Original language: Italian
- No. of seasons: 1
- No. of episodes: 8

Production
- Producers: Tilde Corsi; Gianni Romoli
- Production location: Rome
- Cinematography: Luigi Martinucci
- Editor: Pietro Morana
- Running time: 41–60 minutes
- Production companies: R&C Produzioni

Original release
- Network: Disney+
- Release: 13 April 2022

The Ignorant Angels (Italian: Le Fate Ignoranti) is an Italian romantic-drama television series produced by R&C Produzioni. The series was created by Ferzan Özpetek, who was also responsible for the 2001 Italian film The Ignorant Fairies, on which the series is based. The series premiered on 13 April 2022 in Italy and select additional countries on Star via Disney+ as an Original.

== Plot ==
Antonia's picture perfect life takes an unexpected and tragic turn when her husband Massimo dies in a serious traffic accident. After his death, Antonia finds out that Massimo had an affair during their marriage. But contrary to what was initially assumed, not with a woman, but with a man named Michele. Devastated by the news, Antonia meets with Michele and his group of friends. Michele lives in his house with his friends from different backgrounds. Each of his friends is individual and has his own story and problems. No matter where you come from, no matter how you look, no matter how you are and no matter what sexuality you have, everyone lives in the best possible harmony with one another. An unexpected and moving friendship develops between Antonia and Michele. And all of them go through a time of change in which they grow with their problems and broaden their personal horizons.

== Cast ==
- Cristiana Capotondi as Antonia is a medical executive. She has formed a special and strong bond with her husband Massimo. When a sudden tragedy completely changes her life and leads to the meeting of Michele and his group of friends, Antonia begins to undergo a profound psychological and emotional change.
- Eduardo Scarpetta as Michele is a stage and scenery painter for operas. His house is the center of life for a group of friends who form an extended family. The meeting, or rather the clash with Antonia to cope with their common grief, calls into question their entire love life.
- Luca Argentero as Massimo is a handsome and seductive export-import manager who is in love with Antonia and Michele at the same time. He is the narrative voice of the story. His sudden death leads to a constant presence in the feelings of others and determines their behavior.
- Carla Signoris as Veronica is Antonia's mother and the widow of a general. She is a spoiled, cheerful and reactionary woman who belongs to the bourgeoisie. Veronica is pushy, but nice. Through her daughter Antonia, she also manages to open up to a way of thinking and living that she did not even suspect existed.
- Serra Yılmaz as Serra assumes the role of caretaker and mediator in Michele's house. She is the moral center of the house and everyone's 'mother hen'. Despite her coarse sincerity, she doesn't mince words and spares no one. An old pain leads Serra to try to untie an emotional knot from her past.
- Burak Deniz as Asaf is the nephew of Serra. He is a well-known fashion and war photographer who moves like a hurricane through the house of Michele, trying to swirl in particular the life of Antonia. Naturally handsome, charming and nomadic, Asaf soon becomes a lifeline for some of the house's inhabitants.
- Paola Minaccioni as Luisella is the owner of a fruit and vegetable store and lives temporarily with Vera. She believes herself to be a reincarnation of Brigitte Bardot. Luisella deliberately enters into disastrous relationships with the wrong men and thus also risks, if she finds the partner for life, not recognizing him. She is a nice, cheerful and electrifying woman who acts a little naively.
- Ambra Angiolini as Annamaria is an astrologer and cartomancer. She is in a relationship with Roberta and they live together in the same house as Michele and Serra. However, after a revelation on the part of Roberta, she is forced to deal with a new kind of love. After making a difficult decision, Annamaria goes through a period of evolution full of emotions, realizing that every love relationship has different phases of transformation and growth.
- Anna Ferzetti as Roberta is a psychologist and Annamaria's partner. She is rational and very caring towards the group, but suffers from having to hide her weaknesses and her need for emotional care. This presents Roberta with a great emotional challenge, which makes her question the rules of love and betrayal.
- Edoardo Purgatori as Riccardo is a bank employee and, together with Luciano, forms the most constant and 'normal' couple in Michele's house. But behind this facade of normality hides a man full of insecurity, as well as a hidden and denied jealousy that forces him to make a decision he would never have made otherwise.
- Filippo Scicchitano as Luciano is young and works as an accountant. With Riccardo he formed such a symbiotic couple that it is almost impossible to tell them apart. He is super organized, he has friends in every field and is ready to call on them when the residents of the house need them. Luciano knows how to get what he wants.
- Lilith Primavera as Vera is the owner of a laundry. After fleeing her family, who couldn't all handle the fact that she is trans, Vera feels forced to deal with her own pain alone, especially when confronted with her biggest enemy: her mother. Vera is not afraid of anything and faces the prejudices and discrimination of others in a courageous and often surprising way.
- Edoardo Siravo as Valter has long since retired and taught Michele the trade of scenery painter. He is the Jiminy Cricket in the house of Michele. Cynical but never critical, he interferes in everything with a biting and often relentless humor that hides a melancholy aftertaste. Valter eagerly feeds on the stories of others.
- Samuel Garofalo as Sandro works in the opera's carpentry shop while finishing his studies. Unrequitedly in love, he has found a second family in Michele's house, where he can develop without fear that his feelings will be judged. He is the youngest of them all, but also the most technically proficient. Everyone considers him the 'puppy' of the house.
- Maria Teresa Baluyot as Nora is the Filipino-born domestic helper in Antonia's house, with whom she maintains a formal relationship of mutual respect and sympathy. She suffers with Antonia, but at the same time is pleased by her development. Nora is often sought out by the intrusive Veronica, through whom she monitors or finds out her daughter Antonia's secrets.
- Patrizia Loreti, Giulia Greco, and Mimma Lovoi as the three Maries are three ladies who usually sit on their favorite bench in front of Michele's house. They know everything about everyone and comment in a cheerful but also shameless way on everything they suspect is going on in Michele's house. Likeable, funny and irrepressible, the ladies form a kind of chorus outside the main plot.

== Episodes ==
| No. overall | No. in season | Title | Directed by | Written by | Original release date |
|---|---|---|---|---|---|
| 1 | 1 | "Love" (L'Amore) | Ferzan Özpetek | Gianni Romoli | April 13, 2022 |
Antonia is married to Massimo; their life is good and their relationship seems perfect. However, Antonia doesn’t know that Massimo is cheating on her with a young opera house stage designer, Michele. An unexpected event will radically change all three lives.
| 2 | 2 | "The Absence" (L'assenza) | Ferzan Özpetek | Gianni Romoli | April 13, 2022 |
Antonia is devastated by the accident, but her mother, Veronica, and Nora are no comfort to her. Michele is devastated too, but he can count on the support of his friends, his extended family. Antonia's pain takes a new turn when she discovers an object owned by Massimo, which gives her a new goal: find out who her husband's lover is.
| 3 | 3 | "The Secret" (Il segreto) | Gianluca Mazzella | Gianni Romoli | April 13, 2022 |
Antonia and Michele meet again thanks to his friends; a complicated relationship is born that will lead them to bond more and more. The other group members also deal with the void left by Massimo in their own way, retreating into their memories. Meanwhile, Riccardo and Luciano face a health problem.
| 4 | 4 | "The Betrayal" (Il tradimento) | Gianluca Mazzella | Gianni Romoli & Carlotta Corradi | April 13, 2022 |
As Michele and Antonia spend time together, they share secrets, memories of Massimo and intimate details, and they find things in common in the grief they share. They feel a connection, although their emotions are complicated. Annamaria is also facing a difficult period; Roberta has confessed she was cheating on her. The group encourages Annamaria to react.
| 5 | 5 | "The Family" (La famiglia) | Gianluca Mazzella | Gianni Romoli e Massimo Bacchini | April 13, 2022 |
Asaf, Serra's nephew, arrives in Rome. He is a seductive man who charms the entire group. Michele and Antonia spend more time together and get to know each other better. Vera walks away from her family who won’t accept her gender identity, but she decides to challenge her mother's prejudices.
| 6 | 6 | "The Outside World" (Il mondo fuori) | Gianluca Mazzella | Gianni Romoli & Massimo Bacchini | April 13, 2022 |
While Michele watches on in concern, Antonia and Asaf begin to feel something for each other. Luciano would like to make his relationship with Riccardo official, but the topic opens up debate. The group of friends react to the grave injustice suffered by Sandro.
| 7 | 7 | "The Trip" (Il viaggio) | Ferzan Özpetek | Gianni Romoli & Carlotta Corradi | April 13, 2022 |
The love/hate relationship between Antonia and Michele continues. Asaf makes an unexpected suggestion to Antonia. Veronica asks Antonia to take her to a party, where her secret lover will be as well. Luisella is there too and wreaks havoc with her unpredictable temperament. Riccardo and Luciano organise a party to formalise their civil partnership. Luisella receives a declaration of love.
| 8 | 8 | "Somewhere Else" (L'altrove) | Ferzan Özpetek | Gianni Romoli & Ferzan Özpetek | April 13, 2022 |
Serra has to deal with her past, opening herself up to intense memories of love. Antonia leaves for Istanbul with Asaf and Michele is suffering in her absence. Almost a month has passed since their last meeting, and the two did not part on good terms. Meanwhile Istanbul gives Antonia a new lease of life and her bond with Asaf becomes closer than ever.

== Reception ==
=== Critical response ===
Margaret Lyons of The New York Times stated, "This gorgeous Italian drama (in Italian, with English subtitles) is the pleasurable kind of sad, not the miserable kind; prepare to shed sensual, pensive tears, perhaps over the real estate alone. When Massimo (Luca Argentero) dies in a motorcycle crash, he leaves behind both a stunned widow and a devastated boyfriend. They form a wary but potent bond, bound by a mutual grief they both want to see reflected back to themselves." Mikelle Street of Out, asserted, "Over eight episodes in its first season, we are invited into the home of this family, sometimes through the eyes of Antonia who finds even herself under the house's seductive gravitational pull. While watching you will find yourself laughing, throwing up your hands at the choices being made, and maybe even shedding a tear or two."

=== Accolades ===
The Ignorant Angels was nominated for Outstanding Limited or Anthology Series at the 34th GLAAD Media Awards. For her role, Anna Ferzetti won the Nastro d'argento Grandi Serie for Best Supporting Actress and the Premio Fraiano for Best Supporting Performance.
