= Thou Shalt Not Hate =

2020 Italian-Polish drama film

- Directed by: Mauro Mancini
- Screenplay by: Davide Lisino; Mauro Mancini
- Produced by: Mario Mazzarotto
- Starring: Alessandro Gassmann; Sara Serraiocco
- Cinematography: Mike Stern Sterzyński
- Music by: Pivio and Aldo De Scalzi
- Release date: September 10, 2020 (Venice Film Festival)
- Running time: 96 minutes
- Country: Italy
- Language: Italian

Thou Shalt Not Hate (Italian: Non odiare, Polish: Pod tym samym niebem) is a 2020 Italian-Polish drama film co-written and directed by Mauro Mancini, at his feature film debut.

It premiered at the 77th edition of the Venice Film Festival, in the Venice International Critics' Week sidebar.

== Cast ==
- Alessandro Gassmann as Simone Segre
- Sara Serraiocco as Marica
- Luka Zunic as Marcello
- Lorenzo Buonora as Paolo
- Lorenzo Acquaviva as Rocco
- Cosimo Fusco as Simone's Father
- Gabriele Sangrigoli as Dario

== Production ==
The film is loosely based on real events. It was produced by Movement Film with Rai Cinema, in association with Notorious Pictures.

== Release ==
The film had its world premiere in the Venice International Critics' Week section of the 77th Venice International Film Festival, where Alessandro Gassmann was awarded the Pasinetti Award for Best Actor, and the film received the Sorriso Diverso Venezia Award as Best Italian Film. It was later theatrically released in Italy on 10 September 2020.

== Accolades ==
Award	Date of ceremony	Category	Recipient(s)	Result	Ref.
Ciak d'oro	20 November 2021	Best Actor	Alessandro Gassmann	Nominated	
Ciak d'oro	20 November 2021	Best First Work	Mauro Mancini	Nominated	
David di Donatello	11 May 2021	Best New Director	Mauro Mancini	Nominated	
David di Donatello	11 May 2021	Best Score	Pivio and Aldo De Scalzi	Nominated	
David di Donatello	11 May 2021	Best Original Song	Pivio and Aldo De Scalzi, Ginevra Nervi	Nominated	
Nastro d'Argento	22 June 2021	Best Supporting Actress	Sara Serraiocco	Won	
Nastro d'Argento	22 June 2021	Best Actor	Alessandro Gassmann	Nominated	
Nastro d'Argento	22 June 2021	Best New Director	Mauro Mancini	Nominated	
Nastro d'Argento	22 June 2021	Best Score	Pivio and Aldo De Scalzi	Nominated	
Premio Flaiano	4 July 2021	Best Actor	Alessandro Gassmann	Won	
Venice International Film Festival	12 September 2020	Pasinetti Award for Best Actor	Alessandro Gassmann	Won	
Venice International Film Festival	12 September 2020	Sorriso Diverso Venezia Award	Thou Shalt Not Hate	Won	
