= The Ruthless =

2019 drama film

- Film poster
- Italian: Lo spietato
- Directed by: Renato De Maria
- Written by: Renato De Maria; Valentina Strada
- Starring: Riccardo Scamarcio; Sara Serraiocco; Alessio Praticò; Alessandro Tedeschi; Marie-Ange Casta
- Distributed by: Nexo Digital
- Release date: 8 April 2019
- Running time: 111 minutes
- Countries: Italy; France
- Languages: Italian, Lombard and Sicilian

The Ruthless (Italian: Lo spietato) is a 2019 Italian-French crime drama film directed by Renato De Maria and starring Riccardo Scamarcio. The film premiered in Italy on 8 April 2019, and was released on Netflix on 19 April 2019.

== Plot ==
At the age of sixteen, Santo Russo leaves Calabria with his mother and younger brother to join his father, a former member of the 'Ndrangheta who was expelled from the organization due to a transgression. The family settles in Romano Banco, a suburb of Milan, where Santo begins working as a porter and befriends Mario Barbieri, the son of the local deli owner. During this time, he also starts learning the Milanese dialect. However, Santo finds himself surrounded by key figures in Milan's criminal underworld, including 'Ndrangheta affiliates from his hometown, operating under the control of the powerful Gaetani family.

On New Year's Eve, while his family celebrates at home with new friends, also from Calabria, Santo and Mario wander drunkenly through the streets of Milan. They are stopped by the police near a stolen Lambretta scooter and become suspects. After proving their innocence, the police contact their parents, but Santo's father refuses to acknowledge him, leading to Santo spending four months in the Beccaria juvenile detention center. There, he befriends "Slim", another young Calabrian inmate serving time for robberies, forging a strong relationship that evolves into a partnership in criminal ventures.

From robberies to kidnappings and heroin production, Santo rises through the criminal ranks, forging ties with the 'Ndrangheta in Lombardy. His ascent ultimately ends when he chooses to cooperate with law enforcement.

== Cast ==
- Riccardo Scamarcio as Santo Russo
- Sara Serraiocco as Mariangela
- Alessio Praticò as Salvatore 'Slim' Mammone
- Alessandro Tedeschi as Mario Barbieri
- Marie-Ange Casta as Annabelle
- Sara Cardinaletti as Suor Giuseppina
- Angelo Libri as Pantaleone Russo
- Adele Tirante as Caterina Russo
- Michele De Virgilio as Avvocato Giovanni Bova
- Aram Kian as Nuri
- Sebastian Gimelli Morosini as Giampi
- Pietro Pace as Spadafora
- Fabio Pellicori as Ciccio Gaetani
- Giuseppe Percoco as Paolino Gaetani
- Marco Ripoldi as Cameriere
