= Lolita Lobosco =

- Genre: Detective fiction; Comedy-drama; Mystery
- Based on: Lolita Lobosco series by Gabriella Genisi
- Directed by: Luca Miniero; Renato De Maria
- Starring: Luisa Ranieri; Giovanni Ludeno; Jacopo Cullin; Bianca Nappi; Filippo Scicchitano; Lunetta Savino; Maurizio Donadoni; Giulia Fiume; Aldo Ottobrino; Francesco De Vito; Corrado Nuzzo; Mauro Sgueglia
- Composers: Santi Pulvirenti; Tommy Caputo
- Country of origin: Italy
- Original language: Italian
- No. of seasons: 3
- No. of episodes: 14

Original release
- Network: Rai 1
- Release: 21 February 2021 – present

Lolita Lobosco (Italian: Le indagini di Lolita Lobosco) is an Italian mystery comedy-drama series, produced by Rai Fiction. The series stars Luisa Ranieri in the title role. It is based on the Lolita Lobosco series of crime novels by Gabriella Genisi.

Broadcast on Rai 1 since 2021, the series is set in Bari, Apulia. In the United Kingdom, it is broadcast by Channel 4. In the United States and in Canada, it is available on PBS Masterpiece Prime Video Channel.

== Cast ==
- Luisa Ranieri as Lolita Lobosco
- Lunetta Savino as Nunzia
- Filippo Scicchitano as Danilo Martini
- Giovanni Ludeno as Antonio Forte
- Jacopo Cullin as Lello Esposito
- Bianca Nappi as Marietta Carrozza
- Giulia Fiume as Carmela Lobosco
- Francesco De Vito as Professor Introna
- Corrado Nuzzo as Tonio
- Aldo Ottobrino as Nicola "Petresine" Lobosco
- Camilla Diana as Caterina
- Claudia Lerro as Porzia Forte
- Maurizio Donadoni as Trifone
- Ninni Bruschetta as Police Commissioner Iacovella
- Vincenzo De Michele as Agent Scivittaro
- Gian Piero Rotoli as Agent Silente
- Giovanni Trombetta as Agent Calopresti
- Nunzia Schiano as Andreina
- Mario Sgueglia as Angelo
- Susy Del Giudice as Vincenzina

== Series overview ==
Series	Episodes	Originally released	
Series	Episodes	First released	Last released
1	4	21 February 2021	14 March 2021
2	6	8 January 2023	12 February 2023
3	4	4 March 2024	25 March 2024
