= A Special Day (2012 film) =

2012 film

- Film poster
- Directed by: Francesca Comencini
- Starring: Giulia Valentini; Filippo Scicchitano
- Cinematography: Luca Bigazzi
- Edited by: Massimo Fiocchi; Chiara Vullo
- Music by: Ratchev & Carratello
- Release date: 7 September 2012 (Venice)
- Running time: 89 minutes
- Country: Italy
- Language: Italian

A Special Day (Italian: Un giorno speciale) is a 2012 Italian drama film directed by Francesca Comencini. The film was selected to compete for the Golden Lion at the 69th Venice International Film Festival.

== Cast ==
- Filippo Scicchitano as Marco
- Giulia Valentini as Gina
- Roberto Infascelli as warehouse driver
- Antonio Zavatteri as On. Balestra
- Daniela Del Priore as Marta
- Rocco Miglionicco as Rocco
