= Worldly Girl =

- Film poster
- Directed by: Marco Danieli
- Written by: Marco Danieli; Antonio Manca
- Produced by: Fabio Piscopo
- Starring: Sara Serraiocco; Michele Riondino
- Cinematography: Emanuele Pasquet
- Music by: Umberto Smerilli
- Release date: September 7, 2016 (Venice Film Festival)
- Country: Italy
- Language: Italian

Worldly Girl (Italian: La ragazza del mondo) is a 2016 Italian drama film co-written and directed by Marco Danieli, at his feature film debut.

The film was screened at the 73rd edition of the Venice Film Festival in the Venice Days section, in which it was awarded the Lizzani Award and the Brian Award.

== Cast ==
- Sara Serraiocco as Giulia
- Michele Riondino as Libero
- Marco Leonardi
- Stefania Montorsi
- Pippo Delbono
- Maria Chiara Giannetta

== See also ==
- List of Italian films of 2016
