= Chlorine (2015 film) =

- Directed by: Lamberto Sanfelice
- Written by: Elisa Amoruso; Sara Lazzaro; Lamberto Sanfelice
- Produced by: Ginevra Elkann; Damiano Ticconi
- Starring: Sara Serraiocco
- Cinematography: Michele Paradisi
- Music by: Piernicola Di Muro
- Release date: 26 January 2015 (SFF)
- Running time: 98 minutes
- Country: Italy
- Language: Italian

Chlorine (Italian: Cloro) is a 2015 drama film written and directed by Lamberto Sanfelice and starring Sara Serraiocco. It was entered into the World Cinema Dramatic competition at the 2015 Sundance Film Festival. Sanfelice was nominated for Best New Director at the 2015 David di Donatello Awards.

== Plot ==
Girl, who dreams to be a synchronized swimmer, puts her training on hold when she has to take care of her little brother and sick father after her mother suddenly dies.

== Cast ==
- Sara Serraiocco as Jenny
- Piera Degli Esposti as Preside
- Giorgio Colangeli as Tondino
- Ivan Franek as Ivan
- Anatol Sassi as Fabrizio
- Andrea Vergoni as Alfio

== See also ==
- List of Italian films of 2015
