= Carlo Giuliani, Boy =

2002 film

- Directed by: Francesca Comencini
- Produced by: Mauro Berardi
- Edited by: Linda Taylor
- Music by: Ennio Morricone
- Release date: 12 June 2002
- Running time: 75 minutes
- Country: Italy
- Language: Italian

Carlo Giuliani, Boy (Italian: Carlo Giuliani, ragazzo) is a 2002 Italian documentary film directed by Francesca Comencini. It was screened out of competition at the 2002 Cannes Film Festival. It details the death of Carlo Giuliani, who was shot dead by a police officer during the demonstrations against the Group of Eight in 2001.
