= The First Day of My Life =

2023 Italian film

- Theatrical release poster
- Directed by: Paolo Genovese
- Written by: Paolo Genovese; Paolo Costella; Rolando Ravello; Isabella Aguilar
- Starring: Toni Servillo; Valerio Mastandrea; Margherita Buy; Sara Serraiocco
- Cinematography: Fabrizio Lucci
- Music by: Maurizio Filardo
- Distributed by: Medusa Film
- Release date: 26 January 2023
- Running time: 121 minutes
- Country: Italy
- Language: Italian

The First Day of My Life (Italian: Il primo giorno della mia vita) is a 2023 Italian comedy-drama film co-written and directed by Paolo Genovese. It is based on his homonymous 2018 book.

The movie tells the story of four people with different life experiences who all fall into a low point in their lives and decide to commit suicide. And at this moment, a mysterious person appeared and told them: in the next week, they will have the opportunity to be reborn, and the story of how their lives will change after being reborn.

== Plot ==
In Rome in January 2021, four people are committing suicide:

- Adriadne, a police officer, whose 16-year-old daughter died from a sudden illness;
- Daniele, a bullied child with diabetes, who intentionally eats 48 doughnuts without taking any insulin;
- Emilia, an Olympic gymnast, who became a paraplegic. She is going to commit suicide by falling from a hotel roof; and
- Napoléon, a motivator, and is married. He is suffering from depression.

On a rainy night, they all find themselves together as "guests" of a mysterious individual who rescued them just moments before each of them was about to make the final decision of their life. Each is asked for a wish.

At the end of the week, all are asked: to continue their plight, or to live.

== Cast ==
- Toni Servillo as the man
- Valerio Mastandrea as Napoléon
- Margherita Buy as Arianna
- Sara Serraiocco as Emilia
- Gabriele Cristini as Daniele
- Vittoria Puccini as the woman
- Lino Guanciale as Tommaso
- Elena Lietti as Greta
- Thomas Trabacchi as Zeno
- Lidia Vitale as Daniele's mother
- Antonio Gerardi as Daniele's father
- Giorgio Tirabassi as Max
- Davide Combusti (it) as Nicolas
- Alessandro Tiberi (it) as the nurse.

== Production ==
On 9 November 2019, it was announced that Hollywood Gang, Leone Film Group and Lotus Productions will co-produce the Genovese's The First Day Of My Life from a screenplay by Kirk Jones, Marco Belardi, Andrea Leone and Raffaella Leone. Principal photography began on 18 January 2021 and was scheduled to conclude on 19 March 2021 in Rome, Italy.

== See also ==
- A Man Called Otto, 2022 US film, where intended suicide by a man interrupted by new neighbours.
- It's a Wonderful Life, 1946 US Christmas film, where a guardian angel intervenes.
