= No Country for Young Men =

2017 Italian comedy film

- Film poster
- Italian: Non è un paese per giovani
- Directed by: Giovanni Veronesi
- Written by: Giovanni Veronesi; Ilaria Macchia; Andrea Paolo Massara
- Starring: Filippo Scicchitano; Giovanni Anzaldo; Sara Serraiocco; Sergio Rubini; Nino Frassica
- Cinematography: Giovanni Canevari
- Edited by: Patrizio Marone
- Music by: Giuliano Sangiorgi
- Distributed by: 01 Distribution
- Release date: 23 March 2017
- Running time: 105 minutes
- Country: Italy
- Language: Italian

No Country for Young Men (Italian: Non è un paese per giovani) is a 2017 Italian comedy film directed by Giovanni Veronesi.

== Cast ==
- Filippo Scicchitano as Sandro
- Giovanni Anzaldo as Luciano
- Sara Serraiocco as Nora
- Sergio Rubini as Sandro's father
- Nino Frassica as Salvatore
- Claudio Corinaldesi as Felipe
- Linda Messerklinger as Cinzia
- Barbara Clara as Gilda Arancio
- Isabel Cutrim as Ector
- Clarita Gatto as Signora Cimpanelli
