= Sara Serraiocco =

Italian actress (born 1990)

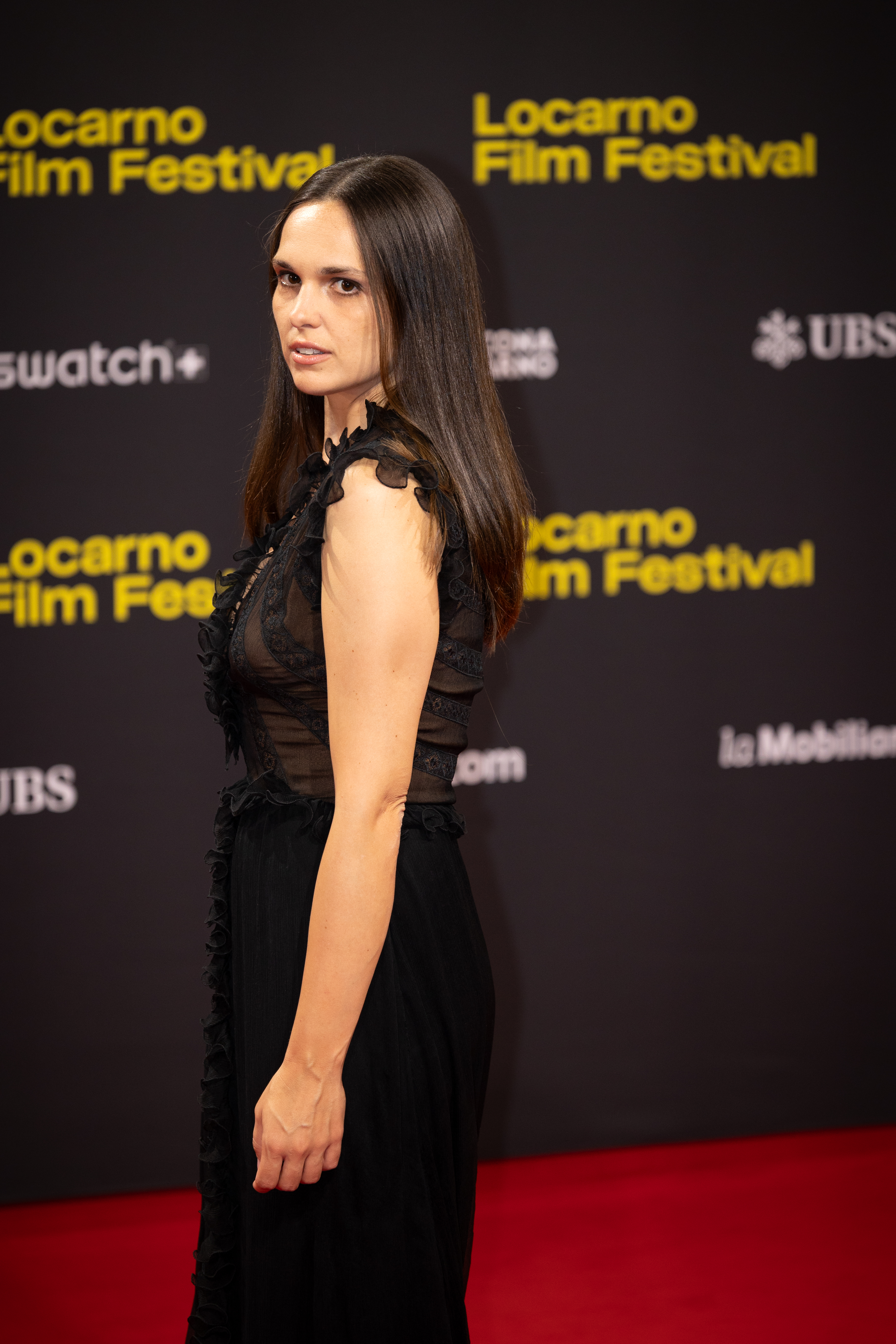
- Sara Serraiocco
- Born: 13 August 1990 (age 36); Pescara, Abruzzo, Italy
- Occupation: Actress
- Years active: 2013–present
- Height: 1.64 m (5 ft 5 in)
- Spouse: Maurilio Mangano
- Children: 1

Sara Serraiocco (born 13 August 1990) is an Italian actress, best known for her roles in the American sci-fi thriller TV series Counterpart and Maura Delpero's Vermiglio, which is nominated for awards in the upcoming 2025 Golden Globes and the European Film Awards.

== Life and career ==
Born in Pescara, Serraiocco developed a passion for dance and cinema, from a young age, initially working as a dance teacher before pursuing acting. She attended the Centro Sperimentale di Cinematografia Italian National Film School.

After appearing in an episode of the hit crime series R.I.S. Roma, Serraiocco made her film debut in 2013, starring in Salvo, which received The Critics' Week Grand Prix at 2013 Cannes Film Festival. Her performance as Rita, a blind teenager brought up in the suburbs of Palermo, earned her several awards, including the Globo D'oro (Italian Golden Globe) for best actress and the "Guglielmo Biraghi" Nastro d'Argento as best new talent.

In 2014, director Liliana Cavani chose Serraiocco for the role of Saint Clare of Assisi in the miniseries Francesco.

Serraiocco then starred in the 2015 film Cloro, directed by Lamberto Sanfelice, which was selected for the Sundance Film Festival and the 65th Berlin International Film Festival (Generation section). Her performance earned her an Italian Golden Globe nomination for Best Actress. Also in 2015, Serraiocco starred as Tecla in Enrico Pau's film Accabadora and served on the jury of the Independent section at the Rome Film Festival.

In 2016, Serraiocco was awarded the Shooting Stars Award as best European talent during the 66th Berlin International Film Festival. Meanwhile, she landed the lead role in Marco Danieli's debut feature film Worldly Girl, which was selected in the GdA review during the Venice Film Festival. Her performance in this film granted her several recognitions: the "Premio Pasinetti" (the National guild of Film critics' award) as Best Actress and two additional nominations for Best Actress at the Italian Golden Globes and Nastri d'Argento. She also won the Golden Ciak, with Michele Riondino, for Best Acting Duo of the Year.

In 2017, Serraiocco took on the role of Nora, the lead female role in Giovanni Veronesi's No Country for Young Men a film about a radio show hosted by Danieli on Radio 2. Her performance earned her a nomination for Best Lead Actress at the Nastri d'Argento. She also starred in Cosimo Gomez's debut film Brutti e Cattivi, which was presented in the "Orizzonti" section of the Venice Film Festival. That same year, she was cast as Baldwin in the TV series Counterpart, where she acted alongside Academy Award winner J. K. Simmons. Her performance earned her a Best Supporting Actress nomination at the Autostraddle TV Awards.

Between seasons of Counterpart, Serraiocco returned to Italy to shoot Alessandro Capitani's debut film In Viaggio con Adele (Travelling with Adele), which was selected for the 2018 Rome Film Festival. She was also tapped by director Renato De Maria to play the lead female role in Lo Spietato.

In 2019, Serraiocco played Marica in Thou Shalt Not Hate, directed by Mauro Mancini. The film was selected for the 2020 Venice Film Festival (Critic's Week). For her performance, Serraiocco was awarded the prestigious Nastro d'Argento for Best Supporting Actress. She also appeared in Lo Sto Bene, directed by Donato Rotunno, which was selected for the 2020 Rome Film Festival.

In 2022 she was chosen as a member of the jury at the 72nd annual Berlin International Film Festival (Shooting Stars award). That year, she also played the female lead role in Il signore delle formiche (The Lord of the Ants, directed by Gianni Amelio, which was selected for the Venice Film Festival 79 in Official Competition. She also took on the role of Giulia in Siccità (Dry, directed by Paolo Virzì), which was selected for the Venice Film Festival 79, Out of Competition, and earned her the prestigious Premio Pasinetti award for Best Ensemble Cast.

She appeared in the films Il primo giorno della mia vita (The First Day of My Life, directed by Paolo Genovese) and Il ritorno di Casanova (The Return of Casanova, directed by Oscar-winner Gabriele Salvatores), as well.

In 2023, Serraiocco starred in Sulla Terra Leggeri (Weightless), a film by Sara Fgaier, which was selected for the International Competition at the 77th Locarno Film Festival. Also in 2023, she joined the cast of the French TV series, "Becoming Karl Lagerfeld", directed by Jérôme Salle which premiered worldwide at Canneseries 2024.

In 2024, Serraiocco starred in Maura Delpero's Vermiglio, which won the 81st Venice Film Festival's Silver Lion. The film is nominated for Best International Film at the 2025 Golden Globe Awards and for the European Film Awards in the categories of Best Feature and Best Direction. Serraiocco then starred as the female lead in Giorgia Farina's Ho visto un re, which has been selected for the 2025 Torino Film Festival and in Sergio Castro San Martín's Il Cileno, which had its world premiere in Piazza Grande at the 79th Locarno Film Festival in 2026.

In 2025 Sara has been a member of the Jury of the Locarno Film Festival 78, Pardi Di Domani.

In the same year, Serraiocco took part as executive producer in the development of Ciao Warsaw, a short film directed by Diletta Di Nicolantonio and presented at Alice Nella Città, the autonomous section of the Rome Film Festival. The film was awarded the Andromeda Award for Best Short Film and received a nomination at the 2026 David di Donatello Awards.

Serraiocco later joined the main cast of The Resurrection of the Christ: Part One and The Resurrection of the Christ: Part Two, directed by Mel Gibson and scheduled for theatrical release on April 27, 2027. Alongside her acting career, she has continued to work as an executive producer on several film projects, including La Paris, directed by Diletta Di Nicolantonio, and Eden Sonate, directed by Ronny Trocker, in which she also stars.

== Filmography ==
=== Film ===
Year	Title	Role	Notes
2013	Salvo	Rita	
2015	Chlorine	Jenny	
2015	L'accabadora	Tecla	
2015	Lazzaro vieni fuori	Sara	Short film
2016	Worldly Girl	Giulia	
2017	No Country for Young Men	Nora	
2017	Ugly Nasty People	Rosabella "Ballerina" Terzi	
2018	In viaggio con Adele	Adele	
2018	A Jacket	Giorgia	Short film
2019	The Ruthless	Mariangela	
2020	Thou Shalt Not Hate	Marica	
2020	Io sto bene	Leo	
2020	The Italian Boys	Sara	
2022	Lord of the Ants	Graziella	
2022	Dry	Giulia	
2023	The First Day of My Life	Emilia	
2023	Il ritorno di Casanova	Silvia	
2024	Sulla terra leggeri	Miriam	
2024	Vermiglio	Anna Pennisi	
2024	Ho visto un re	Regina	
2026	Il cileno	Luciana	
2026	Linea di difesa – Europa	TBA	In production
2026	Linea di difesa – Gaza	TBA	In production
2027	The Resurrection of the Christ: Part One †	Mary Heli	In production
2027	The Resurrection of the Christ: Part Two †	Mary Heli	In production
TBA	'Eden Sonate' †	TBA	In production
TBA	'Audrey la mer' †	TBA	Post-production

=== Production ===
Title	Director
Ciao Warsaw	Diletta Di Nicolantonio
La Paris	Diletta Di Nicolantonio
Eden Sonate	Ronny Trocker

=== Television ===
Year	Title	Role	Notes
2014	Francesco	Clare of Assisi	Two-parts television movie
2017–2019	Counterpart	Nadia Fierro / Baldwin	Main role
2024	Becoming Karl Lagerfeld	Graziella Fontana	Episode: "Mercenaire du prêt-à-porter"

== Awards ==
Nastro d'argento
Year	Title	Category	Result
2014	Salvo	Newcomer of the year	Won
2017	Worldly Girl and No Country for Young Men	Best Actress	Nominated
2018	Brutti e cattivi	Best Actress in a comedy	Nominated
2021	Though shall not hate	Best supporting actress	Won
2023	Il primo giorno della mia vita	Best Supporting Actress	Nominated

Italian Golden Globe
Year	Title	Category	Result
2014	Salvo	Best Actress	Won
2015	Cloro	Best Actress	Nominated
2017	Worldly Girl	Best Actress	Nominated

Berlin Film Festival
Year	Title	Category	Result
2016	Cloro	Best European talent	Won

Venice film festival
Year	Title	Category	Result
2016	Worldly Girl	Premio Pasinetti, Best Actress	Won
2022	Siccità	Premio Pasinetti, Best Ensemble Cast	Won
2014	Salvo	Premio Kineo, Best Actress	Won

Ciak d'oro
Year	Title	Category	Result
2017	Worldly Girl	Best Actress and Best Actor(Michele Riondino)	Won

Festival du film d' Annecy
Year	Title	Category	Result
2015	Cloro	Best Actress	Won
2016	Worldly Girl	Best Actress	Won

Flaiano Award
Year	Title	Category	Result
2013	Salvo	Best Actress Debut	Won
2023	The First Day of My Life	Best Female Performance	Won

Autostraddle TV Award
Year	Title	Category	Result
2018	Counterpart	Outstanding Supporting Actress Playing an LGBTQ+ Character in a Sci-Fi Series	Nominated

Leffest - LIsboa Film Festival
Year	Title	Category	Result
2024	Vermiglio	Best Female Ensamble	Won
