= Francesca Comencini =

Italian film director

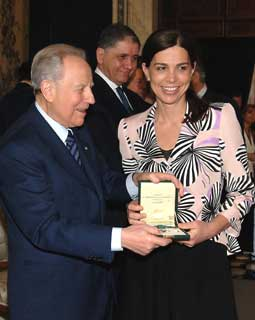
- Francesca Comencini (right) with Carlo Azeglio Ciampi (left)
- Born: 19 August 1961 (age 64); Rome, Italy
- Occupations: Film director, screenwriter
- Years active: 1984–present
- Spouse: Daniel Toscan du Plantier (divorced)
- Father: Luigi Comencini
- Relatives: Cristina Comencini (sister); Carlo Calenda (nephew)

Francesca Comencini (Italian pronunciation: [franˈtʃeska komenˈtʃiːni]; born 19 August 1961) is an Italian film director and screenwriter. She attended the Lycée français Chateaubriand school with her sisters. She has directed 14 films since 1984. Her film The Words of My Father was screened in the Un Certain Regard section at the 2001 Cannes Film Festival. In 2012, her film A Special Day was selected to compete for the Golden Lion at the 69th Venice International Film Festival. She was married to French producer Daniel Toscan du Plantier.

== Filmography ==
- Pianoforte (1984)
- La lumière du lac (1988)
- Annabelle partagée (1991)
- Elsa Morante (1997)
- The Words of My Father (2001)
- Un altro mondo è possibile (2001)
- Carlo Giuliani, Boy (2002)
- Firenze, il nostro domani (2003)
- I Like to Work (Mobbing) (2004)
- Visions of Europe (2004)
- Our Country (2006)
- In fabbrica (2007)
- L'Aquila 2009 - Cinque registi tra le macerie (2009)
- The White Space (2009)
- A Special Day (2012)
- Gomorrah (from 2014) (TV series)
- Stories of Love That Cannot Belong to This World (2017)
- Django (TV series) (also creative director) (2023)
- The Time It Takes (2024)
