= David di Donatello for Best Actress =

Annual Italian film award

David di Donatello for Best Actress in a Leading Role
- Awarded for: Best Performance by a Leading Actress in a Film
- Country: Italy
- Presented by: Accademia del Cinema Italiano
- First award: 1956 (for female lead acting in films released during the 1955/1956 film season)
- Currently held by: Aurora Quattrocchi — Sweetheart (2025)
- Website: daviddidonatello.it

The David di Donatello Award for Best Actress (Italian: David di Donatello per la migliore attrice protagonista) is a film award presented annually by the Accademia del Cinema Italiano (ACI, Academy of Italian Cinema) to recognize the outstanding performance in a leading role of an actress who has worked within the Italian film industry during the year preceding the ceremony. Nominees and winner are selected via run-off voting by all the members of the Accademia.

The award was first given in 1956. Sophia Loren is the record holder in this category, with seven awards, followed by Margherita Buy and Monica Vitti, with five awards each.

== Winners and nominees ==
Below, winners are listed first in the colored row, followed by other nominees.

=== 1950s ===
Year	Actor	Role(s)	Film
1955/56 (1st)
1955/56 (1st)	Gina Lollobrigida	Lina Cavalieri	Beautiful But Dangerous
1956/57 (2nd)
1956/57 (2nd)	Not awarded		
1957/58 (3rd)
1957/58 (3rd)	Anna Magnani	Gioia	Wild Is the Wind
1958/59 (4th)
1958/59 (4th)	Anna Magnani	Egle	...And the Wild Wild Women

=== 1960s ===
Year	Actor	Role(s)	Film
1959/60 (5th)
1959/60 (5th)	Not awarded		
1960/61 (6th)
1960/61 (6th)	Sophia Loren	Cesira	Two Women
1961/62 (7th)
1961/62 (7th)	Not awarded		
1962/63 (8th)
1962/63 (8th)	Gina Lollobrigida	Pauline Bonaparte	Imperial Venus
1962/63 (8th)	Silvana Mangano	Edda Mussolini	The Verona Trial
1963/64 (9th)
1963/64 (9th)	Sophia Loren	Adelina Sbaratti / Anna Molteni / Mara	Yesterday, Today and Tomorrow
1964/65 (10th)
1964/65 (10th)	Sophia Loren	Filumena Marturano	Marriage Italian-Style
1965/66 (11th)
1965/66 (11th)	Giulietta Masina	Giulietta Boldrini	Juliet of the Spirits
1966/67 (12th)
1966/67 (12th)	Silvana Mangano	Gloria / Fast Lady / Assurdina Caì / Nunzia / Giovanna	The Witches
1967/68 (13th)
1967/68 (13th)	Claudia Cardinale	Rosa Nicolosi	The Day of the Owl
1968/69 (14th)
1968/69 (14th)	Gina Lollobrigida	Carla Campbell	Buona Sera, Mrs. Campbell
1968/69 (14th)	Monica Vitti	Assunta Patanè	The Girl with the Pistol

=== 1970s ===
Year	Actor	Role(s)	Film
1969/70 (15th)
1969/70 (15th)	Sophia Loren	Giovanna	Sunflower
1970/71 (16th)
1970/71 (16th)	Florinda Bolkan	Valeria	The Anonymous Venetian
1970/71 (16th)	Monica Vitti	Maria Campi / Ninì Tirabusciò	Ninì Tirabusciò: la donna che inventò la mossa
1971/72 (17th)
1971/72 (17th)	Claudia Cardinale	Carmela	A Girl in Australia
1972/73 (18th)
1972/73 (18th)	Florinda Bolkan	Giulia Bonanni	Dear Parents
1972/73 (18th)	Silvana Mangano	Antonia	The Scientific Cardplayer
1973/74 (19th)
1973/74 (19th)	Sophia Loren	Adriana De Mauro	The Voyage
1973/74 (19th)	Monica Vitti	Dea Dani	Polvere di stelle
1974/75 (20th)
1974/75 (20th)	Mariangela Melato	Officer Giovanna Abbastanzi	Policewoman
1975/76 (21st)
1975/76 (21st)	Monica Vitti	Lisa Stefani	Duck in Orange Sauce
1976/77 (22nd)
1976/77 (22nd)	Mariangela Melato	Mara Castelli	Caro Michele
1977/78 (23rd)
1977/78 (23rd)	Sophia Loren	Antonietta	A Special Day
1977/78 (23rd)	Mariangela Melato	Ofelia Pegoraro	The Cat
1978/79 (24th)
1978/79 (24th)	Monica Vitti	Anna Rossi / Lisa Bianchi	Amori miei

=== 1980s ===
Year	Actor	Role(s)	Film
1979/80 (25th)
1979/80 (25th)	Virna Lisi	Wilma Malinverni	The Cricket
1980/81 (26th)
1980/81 (26th)	Valeria D'Obici	Fosca	Passion of Love
1980/81 (26th)	Mariangela Melato	Francesca	Help Me Dream
1980/81 (26th)	Elena Fabrizi	Teresa	Bianco, rosso e Verdone
1981/82 (27th)
1981/82 (27th)	Eleonora Giorgi	Nadia Vandelli	Talcum Powder
1981/82 (27th)	Ornella Muti	Cass	Tales of Ordinary Madness
1981/82 (27th)	Marina Suma	Rosa	The Opportunities of Rosa
1982/83 (28th)
1982/83 (28th)	Giuliana De Sio	Chiara	The Pool Hustlers
1982/83 (28th)	Giuliana De Sio	Marta Vitale	Sciopèn
1982/83 (28th)	Mariangela Melato	Marta	The Good Soldier
1982/83 (28th)	Hanna Schygulla	Eugenia	The Story of Piera
1983/84 (29th)
1983/84 (29th)	Lina Sastri	Luciella Picone	Where's Picone?
1983/84 (29th)	Laura Morante	Bianca	Sweet Body of Bianca
1983/84 (29th)	Monica Vitti	Laura	Flirt
1984/85 (30th)
1984/85 (30th)	Lina Sastri	Laura	Secrets Secrets
1984/85 (30th)	Giuliana De Sio	Chiara	Casablanca, Casablanca
1984/85 (30th)	Lea Massari	Marta	Secrets Secrets
1984/85 (30th)	Julia Migenes	Carmen	Carmen
1985/86 (31st)
1985/86 (31st)	Ángela Molina	Nunziata	Camorra
1985/86 (31st)	Giulietta Masina	Amelia Bonetti / Ginger	Ginger and Fred
1985/86 (31st)	Liv Ullmann	Elena	Let's Hope It's a Girl
1986/87 (32nd)
1986/87 (32nd)	Liv Ullmann	Ida Nudel	Farewell Moscow
1986/87 (32nd)	Valeria Golino	Bruna Assecondati	A Tale of Love
1986/87 (32nd)	Stefania Sandrelli	Beatrice	The Family
1987/88 (33rd)
1987/88 (33rd)	Elena Safonova	Anna Sergeyevna	Dark Eyes
1987/88 (33rd)	Valeria Golino	Nora Treves	The Gold Rimmed Glasses
1987/88 (33rd)	Ornella Muti	Silvia Piergentili	Io e mia sorella
1988/89 (34th)
1988/89 (34th)	Stefania Sandrelli	Laura	Mignon Has Come to Stay
1988/89 (34th)	Ornella Muti	Anna	Private Access
1988/89 (34th)	Marina Vlady	Chantal	Splendor

=== 1990s ===
Year	Actor	Role(s)	Film
1989/90 (35th)
1989/90 (35th)	Elena Sofia Ricci	Alma	Ne parliamo Lunedì
1989/90 (35th)	Anna Bonaiuto	Carla	Donna d'ombra
1989/90 (35th)	Virna Lisi	Elvira	Happy Christmas Happy New Year
1989/90 (35th)	Stefania Sandrelli	Evelina	Evelina e i suoi figli
1989/90 (35th)	Lina Sastri	Francesca	Little Misunderstandings
1990/91 (36th)
1990/91 (36th)	Margherita Buy	Flavia	The Station
1990/91 (36th)	Nancy Brilli	Giulia	Italia-Germania 4-3
1990/91 (36th)	Margherita Buy	Gloria	The Week of the Sphinx
1990/91 (36th)	Angela Finocchiaro	Martina	To Want to Fly
1990/91 (36th)	Ingrid Thulin	Adelina	The House of Smiles
1991/92 (37th)
1991/92 (37th)	Giuliana De Sio	Emilia Schmidt	The Wicked
1991/92 (37th)	Margherita Buy	Camilla Landolfi	Damned the Day I Met You
1991/92 (37th)	Francesca Neri	Cecilia	Pensavo fosse amore, invece era un calesse
1992/93 (38th)
1992/93 (38th)	Antonella Ponziani	Paola	Verso Sud
1992/93 (38th)	Margherita Buy	Stefania	Cominciò tutto per caso
1992/93 (38th)	Carla Gravina	Carla Aldrovandi	The Long Silence
1993/94 (39th)
1993/94 (39th)	Asia Argento	Arianna	Let's Not Keep in Touch
1993/94 (39th)	Chiara Caselli	Elena Setti	Where Are You? I'm Here
1993/94 (39th)	Barbara De Rossi	Mara	Sentimental Maniacs
1994/95 (40th)
1994/95 (40th)	Anna Bonaiuto	Delia	Nasty Love
1994/95 (40th)	Sabrina Ferilli	Mirella	Living It Up
1994/95 (40th)	Anna Galiena	Gina	No Skin
1995/96 (41st)
1995/96 (41st)	Valeria Bruni Tedeschi	Lisa Venturi	The Second Time
1995/96 (41st)	Virna Lisi	Olga	Follow Your Heart
1995/96 (41st)	Laura Morante	Cecilia Sarcoli	August Vacation
1995/96 (41st)	Lina Sastri	Anna Magnani	Celluloide
1996/97 (42nd)
1996/97 (42nd)	Asia Argento	Cora	Traveling Companion
1996/97 (42nd)	Margherita Buy	Franca Nava	An Eyewitness Account
1996/97 (42nd)	Iaia Forte	Luna di Capua / Ombretta	Luna e l'altra
1996/97 (42nd)	Claudia Gerini	Iris Blond	I'm Crazy About Iris Blond
1996/97 (42nd)	Monica Guerritore	Gnà Pina	La lupa
1997/98 (43rd)
1997/98 (43rd)	Valeria Bruni Tedeschi	Angela	Notes of Love
1997/98 (43rd)	Anna Bonaiuto	Luisella Cielo	Rehearsals for War
1997/98 (43rd)	Valeria Golino	Maria	The Acrobats
1998/99 (44th)
1998/99 (44th)	Margherita Buy	Sister Caterina	Not of this World
1998/99 (44th)	Francesca Neri	Giulia	Marriages
1998/99 (44th)	Giovanna Mezzogiorno	Liliana	Of Lost Love

=== 2000s ===
Year	Actor	Role(s)	Film
1999/00 (45th)
1999/00 (45th)	Licia Maglietta	Rosalba Barletta	Bread and Tulips
1999/00 (45th)	Lorenza Indovina	Sara	A Love
1999/00 (45th)	Francesca Neri	Sofia	The Sweet Sounds of Life
1999/00 (45th)	Francesca Neri	Andrea	Io amo Andrea
1999/00 (45th)	Isabella Rossellini	Katchen Einstein	Il cielo cade
2000/01 (46th)
2000/01 (46th)	Laura Morante	Paola	The Son's Room
2000/01 (46th)	Margherita Buy	Antonia	The Ignorant Fairies
2000/01 (46th)	Giovanna Mezzogiorno	Giulia	The Last Kiss
2001/02 (47th)
2001/02 (47th)	Marina Confalone	Patrizia Aiello	A Neapolitan Spell
2001/02 (47th)	Sandra Ceccarelli	Maria	Light of My Eyes
2001/02 (47th)	Licia Maglietta	Irene	Red Moon
2002/03 (48th)
2002/03 (48th)	Giovanna Mezzogiorno	Giovanna	Facing Windows
2002/03 (48th)	Donatella Finocchiaro	Angela	Angela
2002/03 (48th)	Valeria Golino	Grazia	Respiro
2002/03 (48th)	Laura Morante	Giulia Ristuccia	Remember Me, My Love
2002/03 (48th)	Stefania Rocca	Stefania	Casomai
2003/04 (49th)
2003/04 (49th)	Penélope Cruz	Itala	Don't Move
2003/04 (49th)	Michela Cescon	Sonia	First Love
2003/04 (49th)	Licia Maglietta	Agata Torregiani	Agata and the Storm
2003/04 (49th)	Violante Placido	Carmen	What Will Happen to Us
2003/04 (49th)	Maya Sansa	Chiara	Good Morning, Night
2004/05 (50th)
2004/05 (50th)	Barbora Bobuľová	Irene Ravelli	Sacred Heart
2004/05 (50th)	Sandra Ceccarelli	Laura	The Life That I Want
2004/05 (50th)	Valentina Cervi	Silvia Battaglia	Smalltown, Italy
2004/05 (50th)	Maria De Medeiros	Eleonora Fonseca Pimentel	The Remains of Nothing
2004/05 (50th)	Maya Sansa	Maria	An Italian Romance
2005/06 (51st)
2005/06 (51st)	Valeria Golino	Giulia	Mario's War
2005/06 (51st)	Margherita Buy	Paola Bonomo / Aidra	The Caiman
2005/06 (51st)	Cristiana Capotondi	Claudia Martinelli	Notte prima degli esami
2005/06 (51st)	Giovanna Mezzogiorno	Sabina	The Beast in the Heart
2005/06 (51st)	Ana Caterina Morariu	Cecilia De Bellis	My Best Enemy
2006/07 (52nd)
2006/07 (52nd)	Ksenia Rappoport	Irena	The Unknown Woman
2006/07 (52nd)	Donatella Finocchiaro	Bona di Gravina	The Wedding Director
2006/07 (52nd)	Margherita Buy	Angelica	Saturn in Opposition
2006/07 (52nd)	Giovanna Mezzogiorno	Chiara	Flying Lessons
2006/07 (52nd)	Laura Morante	Monica	The Ball
2007/08 (53rd)
2007/08 (53rd)	Margherita Buy	Elsa	Days and Clouds
2007/08 (53rd)	Anna Bonaiuto	Sanzio's Wife	The Girl by the Lake
2007/08 (53rd)	Antonia Liskova	Mara	Riparo
2007/08 (53rd)	Valentina Lodovini	Mara	The Right Distance
2007/08 (53rd)	Valeria Solarino	Emma	Miss F
2008/09 (54th)
2008/09 (54th)	Alba Rohrwacher	Giovanna Casali	Giovanna's Father
2008/09 (54th)	Donatella Finocchiaro	Lucia Rizzo	The Brave Men
2008/09 (54th)	Claudia Gerini	Adele	Different from Whom?
2008/09 (54th)	Valeria Golino	Giulia	Giulia Doesn't Date at Night
2008/09 (54th)	Ilaria Occhini	Gemma	Mar nero

=== 2010s ===
Year	Actor	Role(s)	Film
2009/10 (55th)
2009/10 (55th)	Micaela Ramazzotti	Young Anna Michelucci	The First Beautiful Thing
2009/10 (55th)	Margherita Buy	Maria	The White Space
2009/10 (55th)	Giovanna Mezzogiorno	Ida Dalser	Vincere
2009/10 (55th)	Stefania Sandrelli	Old Anna Michelucci	The First Beautiful Thing
2009/10 (55th)	Greta Zuccheri Montanari	Martina	The Man Who Will Come
2010/11 (56th)
2010/11 (56th)	Paola Cortellesi	Alice Bottini	Escort in Love
2010/11 (56th)	Sarah Felberbaum	Laura Aliprandi	The Jewel
2010/11 (56th)	Angela Finocchiaro	Silvia Colombo	Benvenuti al Sud
2010/11 (56th)	Isabella Ragonese	Elena	La nostra vita
2010/11 (56th)	Alba Rohrwacher	Alice Della Rocca	The Solitude of Prime Numbers
2011/12 (57th)
2011/12 (57th)	Zhao Tao	Shun Li	Shun Li and the Poet
2011/12 (57th)	Donatella Finocchiaro	Giulietta	Terraferma
2011/12 (57th)	Claudia Gerini	Monica	Il mio domani
2011/12 (57th)	Valeria Golino	Rosaria Sansone	Kryptonite!
2011/12 (57th)	Micaela Ramazzotti	Gloria	A Flat for Three
2012/13 (58th)
2012/13 (58th)	Margherita Buy	Irene	A Five Star Life
2012/13 (58th)	Valeria Bruni Tedeschi	Danielle	Long Live Freedom
2012/13 (58th)	Tea Falco	Olivia	Me and You
2012/13 (58th)	Thony	Antonia	Every Blessed Day
2012/13 (58th)	Jasmine Trinca	Augusta	There Will Come a Day
2013/14 (59th)
2013/14 (59th)	Valeria Bruni Tedeschi	Carla Bernaschi	Human Capital
2013/14 (59th)	Paola Cortellesi	Luisa Tombolini	Sotto una buona stella
2013/14 (59th)	Sabrina Ferilli	Ramona	The Great Beauty
2013/14 (59th)	Kasia Smutniak	Elena	Fasten Your Seatbelts
2013/14 (59th)	Jasmine Trinca	Irene 'Miele'	Miele
2014/15 (60th)
2014/15 (60th)	Margherita Buy	Margherita	Mia Madre
2014/15 (60th)	Paola Cortellesi	Serena Bruno	Do You See Me?
2014/15 (60th)	Virna Lisi	Rita Crispo	Latin Lover
2014/15 (60th)	Alba Rohrwacher	Mina	Hungry Hearts
2014/15 (60th)	Jasmine Trinca	Delia	You Can't Save Yourself Alone
2015/16 (61st)
2015/16 (61st)	Ilenia Pastorelli	Alessia	They Call Me Jeeg
2015/16 (61st)	Àstrid Bergès-Frisbey	Nadine	Alaska
2015/16 (61st)	Juliette Binoche	Anna	The Wait
2015/16 (61st)	Paola Cortellesi	Luciana Colacci	The Last Will Be the Last
2015/16 (61st)	Sabrina Ferilli	Marina Baldi	Me, Myself and Her
2015/16 (61st)	Anna Foglietta	Carlotta	Perfect Strangers
2015/16 (61st)	Valeria Golino	Anna Ruotolo	Per amor vostro
2016/17 (62nd)
2016/17 (62nd)	Valeria Bruni Tedeschi	Beatrice Morandini Valdirana	Like Crazy
2016/17 (62nd)	Matilda De Angelis	Giulia De Martino	Italian Race
2016/17 (62nd)	Angela and Marianna Fontana	Viola / Daisy	Indivisible
2016/17 (62nd)	Micaela Ramazzotti	Donatella Morelli	Like Crazy
2016/17 (62nd)	Daphne Scoccia	Daphne	Fiore
2017/18 (63rd)
2017/18 (63rd)	Jasmine Trinca	Fortunata	Fortunata
2017/18 (63rd)	Paola Cortellesi	Monica	Like a Cat on a Highway
2017/18 (63rd)	Valeria Golino	Emma	Il colore nascosto delle cose
2017/18 (63rd)	Giovanna Mezzogiorno	Adriana / Isabella	Naples in Veils
2017/18 (63rd)	Isabella Ragonese	Eli	Sun, Heart, Love
2018/19 (64th)
2018/19 (64th)	Elena Sofia Ricci	Veronica Lario	Loro
2018/19 (64th)	Anna Foglietta	Miriam	If Life Gives You Lemons
2018/19 (64th)	Marianna Fontana	Lucia	Capri-Revolution
2018/19 (64th)	Alba Rohrwacher	Lucia Revi	Lucia's Grace
2018/19 (64th)	Pina Turco	Maria	The Vice of Hope
2019/20 (65th)
2019/20 (65th)	Jasmine Trinca	Annamaria Muscarà	The Goddess of Fortune
2019/20 (65th)	Valeria Bruni Tedeschi	Elena	The Summer House
2019/20 (65th)	Isabella Ragonese	Katia	My Brother Chases Dinosaurs
2019/20 (65th)	Linda Caridi	Lei	Remember?
2019/20 (65th)	Lunetta Savino	Rosa	Rosa
2019/20 (65th)	Valeria Golino	Elena Masato	Volare

=== 2020s ===
Year	Actor	Role(s)	Film
2020/21 (66th)
2020/21 (66th)	Sophia Loren	Madame Rosa	The Life Ahead
2020/21 (66th)	Paola Cortellesi	Sara	Figli
2020/21 (66th)	Vittoria Puccini	Elisa	18 Presents
2020/21 (66th)	Micaela Ramazzotti	Gemma	The Best Years
2020/21 (66th)	Alba Rohrwacher	Vanda	The Ties
2021/22 (67th)
2021/22 (67th)	Swamy Rotolo	Chiara	A Chiara
2021/22 (67th)	Miriam Leone	Eva Kant	Diabolik
2021/22 (67th)	Aurora Giovinazzo	Matilde	Freaks Out
2021/22 (67th)	Rosa Palasciano	Giulia	Giulia
2021/22 (67th)	Maria Nazionale	Rosa De Filippo–Scarpetta	The King of Laughter
2022 (68th)
2022 (68th)	Barbara Ronchi	Francesca	September
2022 (68th)	Margherita Buy	Eleonora Chiavarelli	Exterior Night
2022 (68th)	Penélope Cruz	Clara Borghetti	L'immensità
2022 (68th)	Claudia Pandolfi	Sara	Dry
2022 (68th)	Benedetta Porcaroli	Amanda	Amanda
2023 (69th)
2023 (69th)	Paola Cortellesi	Delia	There's Still Tomorrow
2023 (69th)	Linda Caridi	Viviana	Last Night of Amore
2023 (69th)	Isabella Ragonese	Stefania/Vera	Like Sheep Among Wolves
2023 (69th)	Micaela Ramazzotti	Desiré Mazzoni	Felicità
2023 (69th)	Barbara Ronchi	Marianna Mortara	Kidnapped
2024 (70th)
2024 (70th)	Tecla Insolia	Modesta Spataro	The Art of Joy
2024 (70th)	Barbara Ronchi	Licia Licino	Familia
2024 (70th)	Romana Maggiora Vergano	Francesca Comencini	The Time It Takes
2024 (70th)	Celeste Dalla Porta	Parthenope	Parthenope
2024 (70th)	Martina Scrinzi	Lucia Graziadei	Vermiglio
2025 (71st)
2025 (71st)	Aurora Quattrocchi	Gela	Sweetheart
2025 (71st)	Valeria Bruni Tedeschi	Eleonora Duse	Duse
2025 (71st)	Barbara Ronchi	Elisa Zanetti	Elisa
2025 (71st)	Valeria Golino	Goliarda Sapienza	Fuori
2025 (71st)	Anna Ferzetti	Dorotea De Santis	La grazia
2025 (71st)	Tecla Insolia	Cecilia	Primavera

== See also ==
- Nastro d'Argento for Best Actress
- European Film Award for Best Actress
- Academy Award for Best Actress
- BAFTA Award for Best Actress
- César Award for Best Actress
- Goya Award for Best Actress
- Lumière Award for Best Actress
- Cinema of Italy
