= List of Italian films of 2009 =

A list of films produced in Italy in 2009 (see 2009 in film):

Title	Director	Cast	Genre	Notes
2009
18 Years Later	Edoardo Leo	Edoardo Leo, Marco Bonini, Sabrina Impacciatore	comedy-drama	
Baaria - La porta del vento	Giuseppe Tornatore	Francesco Scianna, Margareth Madè, Ficarra e Picone	drama	Set to open the 66th Venice International Film Festival
Barbarossa	Renzo Martinelli	Rutger Hauer, Raz Degan, F. Murray Abraham	Historical	
Bets and Wedding Dresses	Vincenzo Terracciano	Sergio Castellitto, Martina Gedeck	drama	screened at the 66th Venice International Film Festival
The Big Dream	Michele Placido	Luca Argentero, Riccardo Scamarcio, Jasmine Trinca	drama	entered the 66th Venice International Film Festival
The Case of Unfaithful Klara	Roberto Faenza	Laura Chiatti, Claudio Santamaria, Iain Glen	Drama	
Cosmonaut	Susanna Nicchiarelli	Claudia Pandolfi, Sergio Rubini	Coming-of-age	
The Double Hour (La doppia ora)	Giuseppe Capotondi	Filippo Timi, Kseniya Rappoport, Lucia Poli, Giorgio Colangeli	Thriller/Romance	Debut of Giuseppe Capotondi. Golden Lion nomination. Volpi Cup at the 66th Venice International Film Festival.
Un'estate ai Caraibi	Carlo Vanzina	Gigi Proietti, Martina Stella, Carlo Buccirosso	comedy	
The Front Line	Renato De Maria	Riccardo Scamarcio, Giovanna Mezzogiorno	crime-drama	
Generation 1000 Euros	Massimo Venier	Alessandro Tiberi, Carolina Crescentini, Valentina Lodovini	comedy	
Giulia Doesn't Date at Night	Giuseppe Piccioni	Valerio Mastandrea, Valeria Golino	Romance	
Good Morning Aman	Claudio Noce	Valerio Mastandrea, Anita Caprioli	Drama	
I Am Love	Luca Guadagnino	Tilda Swinton, Gabriele Ferzetti, Marisa Berenson	Drama	Nomination at 68th Golden Globe Awards.
Imago Mortis	Stefano Bessoni	Geraldine Chaplin, Oona Chaplin, Alberto Amarilla	Horror	English language
The Ladies Get Their Say	Enzo Monteleone	Paola Cortellesi, Isabella Ferrari, Margherita Buy	comedy-drama	
Many Kisses Later	Fausto Brizzi	Alessandro Gassman, Claudia Gerini, Cristiana Capotondi, Silvio Orlando	Romantic comedy	
The Man Who Will Come	Giorgio Diritti	Maya Sansa, Alba Rohrwacher	Drama	
La matassa	Giambattista Avellino, Ficarra e Picone	Ficarra e Picone, Anna Safroncik, Claudio Gioè, Pino Caruso	comedy	
Purple Sea	Donatella Maiorca	Valeria Solarino, Isabella Ragonese, Ennio Fantastichini, Maria Grazia Cucinotta	Drama	
A Question of the Heart	Francesca Archibugi	Antonio Albanese, Kim Rossi Stuart, Micaela Ramazzotti	comedy-drama	
The Red Shadows	Francesco Maselli	Ennio Fantastichini, Arnoldo Foà, Roberto Herlitzka, Lucia Poli	Political drama	
The Sicilian Girl	Marco Amenta	Veronica D'Agostino, Gérard Jugnot	Drama	
Smile	Francesco Gasperoni	Armand Assante, Antonio Cupo	Horror	English language
Ten Winters	Valerio Mieli	Isabella Ragonese, Michele Riondino	romance	
Ultimatum	Alain Tasma	Gaspard Ulliel, Jasmine Trinca	drama	
Videocracy	Erik Gandini	Fabrizio Corona	Documentary	shown at the 66th Venice International Film Festival
Vincere	Marco Bellocchio	Giovanna Mezzogiorno, Filippo Timi	Drama	In competition at the 2009 Cannes Film Festival.
The White Space	Francesca Comencini	Margherita Buy, Giovanni Ludeno	Drama	In competition at the 66th Venice Festival
