= 63rd David di Donatello =

2018 Italian film awards

- Date: 21 March 2018
- Site: De Paolis Studios, Rome, Italy
- Hosted by: Carlo Conti

Highlights
- Best Picture: Love and Bullets
- Most awards: Love and Bullets (5)
- Most nominations: Love and Bullets (15)

Television coverage
- Network: Rai 1

The 63rd David di Donatello ceremony, presented by the Accademia del Cinema Italiano, was held on 21 March 2018 to honor the best in Italian cinema in 2017.

The nominations were announced on 14 February 2018. The films that obtained the highest number of nominations were the romantic crime musical Love and Bullets which earned 15 nominations and was also the most awarded film with 5 statuettes, and Naples in Veils with 11 nominations.

== Winners and nominees ==
Best Film: Love and Bullets – directed by Manetti Bros‡; A Ciambra – directed by Jonas Carpignano; Cinderella the Cat – directed by Alessandro Rak, Ivan Cappiello, Marino Guarnieri and Dario Sansone; Nico, 1988 – directed by Susanna Nicchiarelli; Tenderness – directed by Gianni Amelio	Best Producer: Cinderella the Cat – Luciano Stella and Maria Carolina Terzi, producers; Mad Entertainment and Rai Cinema, production companies‡; A Ciambra – Jon Copolon and Paolo Carpignano, producers; Stayblack Productions and Rai Cinema, production companies; I Can Quit Whenever I Want: Masterclass, I Can Quit Whenever I Want: Ad Honorem – Domenico Procacci and Matteo Rovere, producers; Rai Cinema, production company; Love and Bullets – Carlo Macchitella and Manetti Bros., producers; Rai Cinema, production company; Nico, 1988 – Marta Donzelli, Gregorio Paonessa, Joseph Rouschop, Valérie Bournonville, producers; Vivo Film, Rai Cinema and Tarantula, production companies
Best Director: Jonas Carpignano – A Ciambra‡; Gianni Amelio – Tenderness; Paolo Genovese – The Place; Manetti Bros. – Love and Bullets; Ferzan Özpetek – Naples in Veils	Best New Director: Donato Carrisi – The Girl in the Fog‡; Roberto De Paolis – Pure Hearts; Andrea De Sica – Children of the Night; Cosimo Gomez – Ugly Nasty People; Andrea Magnani – Easy
Best Actor: Renato Carpentieri – Tenderness as Lorenzo‡; Antonio Albanese – Like a Cat on a Highway as Giovanni; Alessandro Borghi – Naples in Veils as Andrea Galderisi / Luca; Valerio Mastandrea – The Place as The Mysterious Man; Nicola Nocella – Easy as Easy	Best Actress: Jasmine Trinca – Fortunata as Fortunata‡; Paola Cortellesi – Like a Cat on a Highway as Monica; Valeria Golino – Il colore nascosto delle cose as Emma; Giovanna Mezzogiorno – Naples in Veils as Adriana / Isabella; Isabella Ragonese – Sun, Heart, Love as Eli
Best Supporting Actor: Giuliano Montaldo – Friends by Chance as Giorgio Gherarducci‡; Peppe Barra – Naples in Veils as Pasquale; Alessandro Borghi – Fortunata as Chicano; Carlo Buccirosso – Love and Bullets as Don Vincenzo Strozzalone; Elio Germano – Tenderness as Fabio	Best Supporting Actress: Claudia Gerini – Love and Bullets as Donna Maria‡; Sonia Bergamasco – Like a Cat on a Highway as Luce; Anna Bonaiuto – Naples in Veils as Adele; Giulia Lazzarini – The Place as Marcella; Micaela Ramazzotti – Tenderness as Michela
Best Original Screenplay: Nico, 1988 – Susanna Nicchiarelli‡; A Ciambra – Jonas Carpignano; Friends by Chance – Francesco Bruni; The Girl in the Fog – Donato Carrisi; Love and Bullets – Manetti Bros. and Michelangelo La Neve	Best Adapted Screenplay: Sicilian Ghost Story – Fabio Grassadonia and Antonio Piazza; based on the story "Un cavaliere bianco" by Marco Mancassola‡; The Place – Paolo Genovese and Isabella Aguilar; based on the television series The Booth at the End by Christopher Kubasik; Rainbow: A Private Affair – Paolo and Vittorio Taviani; based on the novel A Private Matter by Beppe Fenoglio; Tenderness – Gianni Amelio and Alberto Taraglio; based on the novel The Temptation to Be Happy by Lorenzo Marone; The War of the Yokels – Barbara Alberti, Davide Barletti, Lorenzo Conte and Carlo D'Amicis; based on the novel La guerra dei cafoni by Carlo D'Amicis
Best Cinematography: Naples in Veils – Gian Filippo Corticelli ‡; A Ciambra – Tim Curtin; Malarazza - Una storia di periferia – Gianni Mammolotti; The Place – Fabrizio Lucci; Sicilian Ghost Story – Luca Bigazzi	Best Production Design: Naples in Veils – Deniz Gokturk Kobanbay and Ivana Gargiulo‡; Bloody Richard – Luca Servino; The Girl in the Fog – Tonino Zera; Love and Bullets – Noemi Marchica; Tenderness – Giancarlo Basili; Ugly Nasty People – Maurizio Sabatini
Best Score: Love and Bullets – Pivio and Aldo De Scalzi‡; Cinderella the Cat – Antonio Fresa and Luigi Scialdone; Naples in Veils – Pasquale Catalano; Nico, 1988 – Gatto Ciliegia contro il Grande Freddo; Tenderness – Franco Piersanti	Best Original Song: "Bang Bang" from Love and Bullets – Music by Pivio and Aldo De Scalzi; lyrics by Nelson; performed by Serena Rossi, Franco Ricciardi and Giampaolo Morelli‡; "A chi appartieni" from Cinderella the Cat – Music and lyrics by Dario Sansone; performed by Foja; "Fidati di me" from Bloody Richard – Music and lyrics by Mauro Pagani; performed by Massimo Ranieri and Antonella Lo Coco; "Italy" from Sicilian Ghost Story – Music by Soap&Skin and Anton Spielmann; lyrics and performed by Soap&Skin; "The Place" from The Place – Music by Marco Guazzone, Giovanna Gardelli, Matteo Curallo, Stefano Costantini and Edoardo Cicchinelli; lyrics by Marco Guazzone and Giovanna Gardelli; performed by Marianne Mirage
Best Editing: A Ciambra – Affonso Gonçalves‡; The Girl in the Fog – Massimo Quaglia; Love and Bullets – Federico Maria Maneschi; Nico, 1988 – Stefano Cravero; The Place – Consuelo Catucci	Best Sound: Nico, 1988 – Adriano Di Lorenzo, Alberto Padoan, Marc Bastien, Éric Grattepain and Franco Piscopo‡; A Ciambra – Giuseppe Tripodi, Florian Fèvre, Julien Pérez; Cinderella the Cat – Andrea Cutillo, Timeline Studio and Giorgio Molfini; Love and Bullets – Lavinia Burcheri, Simone Costantino, Claudio Spinelli, Gianluca Basili, Sergio Basili, Antonio Tirinelli and Nadia Paone; Naples in Veils – Fabio Conca, Giuliano Marcaccini, Daniele De Angelis, Giuseppe D'Amato, Antonio Giannantonio, Dario Calvari and Alessandro Checcacci
Best Costumes: Bloody Richard – Massimo Cantini Parrini‡; Love and Bullets – Daniela Salernitano‡; Naples in Veils – Alessandro Lai; Agadah – Nicoletta Taranta; Ugly Nasty People – Anna Lombardi	Best Digital Effects: Cinderella the Cat – Mad Entertainment‡; Addio fottuti musi verdi – Chromatica, Wonderlab and Hive Division; Love and Bullets – Palantir Digital; Monolith – Frame by Frame; Ugly Nasty People – Autre Chose
Best Make-up Artist: Nico, 1988 – Marco Altieri‡; Bloody Richard – Luigi Ciminelli, Emanuele De Luca and Valentina Iannuccilli; Fortunata – Maurizio Fazzini; Love and Bullets – Veronica Luongo; Naples in Veils – Roberto Pastore; Ugly Nasty People – Frédérique Foglia	Best Hairstylist: Nico, 1988 – Daniela Altieri‡; Bloody Richard – Paola Genovese; Fortunata – Mauro Tamagnini; Love and Bullets – Antonio Fidato; Ugly Nasty People – Sharim Sabatini
Best Documentary: Marco Ferreri: Dangerous But Necessary – directed by Selma Dell'Olio‡; '78: The Getaway – directed by Alice Filippi; Evviva Giuseppe – directed by Stefano Consiglio; The Italian Jobs – directed by Marco Spagnoli; Saro – directed by Enrico Maria Artale	Best Short Film: Bismillah – directed by Alessandro Grande‡; Confino – directed by Nico Bonomolo; La giornata – directed by Pippo Mezzapesa; Mezzanotte zero zero – directed by Nicola Conversa; Pazzo & Bella – directed by Marcello Di Noto
Best European Film: The Square (Sweden / Germany / France / Denmark) – directed by Ruben Östlund‡; Borg vs McEnroe (Sweden / Denmark / Finland) – directed by Janus Metz Pedersen; BPM (Beats per Minute) (France) – directed by Robin Campillo; Elle (France / Germany) – directed by Paul Verhoeven; Loving Vincent (Poland / United Kingdom) – directed by Dorota Kobiela and Hugh Welchman	Best Foreign Film: Dunkirk (United Kingdom / United States / France / Netherlands) – directed by Christopher Nolan‡; The Insult (Lebanon / France) – directed by Ziad Doueiri; La La Land (United States) – directed by Damien Chazelle; Loveless (Russia / France / Belgium / Germany) – directed by Andrey Zvyagintsev; Manchester by the Sea (United States) – directed by Kenneth Lonergan
David Youth Award: Friends by Chance – directed by Francesco Bruni‡; Cinderella the Cat – directed by Alessandro Rak, Ivan Cappiello, Marino Guarnieri, Dario Sansone; Gramigna – directed by Sebastiano Rizzo; The Place – directed by Paolo Genovese; Sicilian Ghost Story – directed by Fabio Grassadonia and Antonio Piazza	Special David Awards: Diane Keaton; Stefania Sandrelli; Steven Spielberg
