= Stefano Abbati =

Italian actor (born 1955)

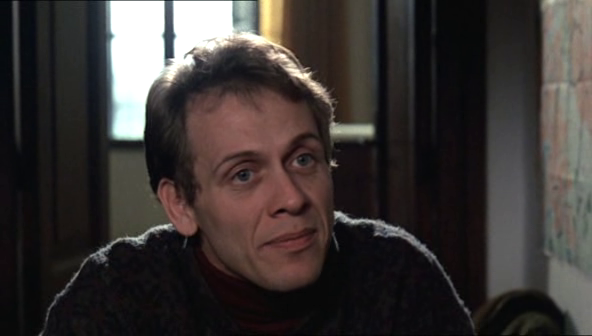
- Stefano Abbati in The Moro Affair, 1986
- Born: 23 February 1955 (age 71); Rimini, Italy
- Occupation: Actor
- Years active: 1983-present

Stefano Abbati (born 23 February 1955) is an Italian actor. He has appeared in more than sixty films since 1983.

== Selected filmography ==
Year	Title	Role	Notes
1986	Devil in the Flesh		
1986	The Moro Affair	Brigadist	
1991	Ask for the Moon		
1993	Where Are You? I'm Here		
1993	Condannato a nozze		
1998	Ecco fatto	Principal	
1998	The Second Wife	Uncle Umberto	
1999	Not of this World		
2000	Against the Wind	Attilio	
2001	The Son's Room		
2003	The Best of Youth	Pusher	
2004	I Can See It in Your Eyes	Sandro	
2015	Mia Madre	Federico	
2024	The Great Ambition	Umberto Terracini	
