= Ninchi =

Ninchi is a surname. Notable people with the surname include:

- Annibale Ninchi (1887–1967), Italian actor, playwright and drama teacher
- Arnaldo Ninchi (1935–2013), Italian actor, voice actor, and basketball player
- Ave Ninchi (1915–1997), Italian actress
- Carlo Ninchi (1897–1974), Italian actor
