= List of Italian films of 2000 =

A list of films produced in Italy in 2000 (see 2000 in film):

Title	Director	Cast	Genre	Notes
2000
20 - Venti	Marco Pozzi	Anita Caprioli, Cecilia Dazzi	Comedy-drama	
Against the Wind (Controvento)	Peter Del Monte	Margherita Buy, Valeria Golino, Ennio Fantastichini	Drama	
All the Love There Is (Tutto l'amore che c'è)	Sergio Rubini	Damiano Russo, Vittoria Puccini, Margherita Buy, Sergio Rubini, Gérard Depardieu	Drama	
Almost Blue	Alex Infascelli	Lorenza Indovina, Andrea Di Stefano, Claudio Santamaria	Thriller	
Body Guards - Guardie del corpo	Neri Parenti	Christian De Sica, Massimo Boldi, Cindy Crawford	Comedy	
Bread and Tulips (Pane e tulipani)	Silvio Soldini	Licia Maglietta, Bruno Ganz, Giuseppe Battiston, Marina Massironi	Comedy	9 David di Donatello. 5 Nastro d'Argento
Canone inverso	Ricky Tognazzi	Hans Matheson, Mélanie Thierry, Gabriel Byrne	Drama	Five David di Donatello (Best Cinematography, Best Editing, Best Production Design, Best Score and a special "Scuola David Award"), three Silver Ribbons (Best Cinematography, Best Editing and Best Score), Best Feature Film award and Audience Award for Best Feature at 2001 Newport Beach Film Festival.
La Carbonara	Luigi Magni	Lucrezia Lante della Rovere, Valerio Mastandrea, Nino Manfredi, Pierfrancesco Favino	Historical comedy-drama	
Denti	Gabriele Salvatores	Sergio Rubini, Anita Caprioli, Paolo Villaggio, Fabrizio Bentivoglio	Comedy-drama	entered the 57th Venice Film Festival
Fantozzi 2000 – La clonazione	Domenico Saverni	Paolo Villaggio, Milena Vukotic, Anna Mazzamauro	Comedy	
First Light of Dawn	Lucio Gaudino	Laura Morante, Gianmarco Tognazzi	Drama	entered the 50th Berlin Film Festival
Free the Fish	Cristina Comencini	Michele Placido, Laura Morante	Comedy	
Freewheeling	Vincenzo Salemme	Vincenzo Salemme, Sabrina Ferilli	Comedy	
Golem	Louis Nero	Moni Ovadia	Drama	
Gostanza da Libbiano	Paolo Benvenuti	Lucia Poli	Drama	
Holy Tongue	Carlo Mazzacurati	Antonio Albanese, Fabrizio Bentivoglio, Isabella Ferrari	Comedy	entered the 57th Venice Film Festival
Io amo Andrea	Francesco Nuti	Francesco Nuti, Francesca Neri, Agathe de La Fontaine	Romantic comedy	
I Prefer the Sound of the Sea	Mimmo Calopresti	Silvio Orlando, Andrea Occhipinti	Drama	Screened at the 2000 Cannes Film Festival
Johnny the Partisan	Guido Chiesa	Stefano Dionisi, Fabrizio Gifuni, Claudio Amendola	War-drama	entered the 57th Venice Film Festival
Joseph of Nazareth	Raffaele Mertes	Tobias Moretti, Ennio Fantastichini, Ida Di Benedetto	Biblical	
Malèna	Giuseppe Tornatore	Monica Bellucci, Giuseppe Sulfaro, Luciano Federico	Drama	2 Academy Award nominations
Mirka	Rachid Benhadj	Vanessa Redgrave, Gérard Depardieu, Sergio Rubini, Franco Nero	Drama	
Nightwatchman	Francesco Calogero	Diego Abatantuono, Marco Messeri	Thriller	
Una noche con Sabrina Love	Alejandro Agresti	Cecilia Roth, Tomás Fonzi, Giancarlo Giannini	Comedy-drama	
I nostri anni	Daniele Gaglianone	-	Documentary	
One Hundred Steps	Marco Tullio Giordana	Luigi Lo Cascio, Luigi Maria Burruano, Tony Sperandeo	Drama	4 David di Donatello
Picasso's Face	Massimo Ceccherini	Massimo Ceccherini, Alessandro Paci, Marco Giallini	Comedy	
Placido Rizzotto	Pasquale Scimeca	Marcello Mazzarella, Vincenzo Albanese, Carmelo Di Mazzarelli	Drama	
The Prince's Manuscript	Roberto Andò	Michel Bouquet, Jeanne Moreau	Biographical drama	
Rosa and Cornelia	Giorgio Treves	Stefania Rocca, Chiara Muti, Athina Cenci	Drama	
Scarlet Diva	Asia Argento	Asia Argento, Jean Shepard, Selen	Erotic drama	
This Is Not Paradise	Gianluca Maria Tavarelli	Fabrizio Gifuni, Valerio Binasco	Crime	
Titanic: The Legend Goes On	Camillo Teti	Mickey Knox, Edmund Purdom	Animation	
Zora the Vampire	Manetti Bros	Micaela Ramazzotti, Toni Bertorelli, Carlo Verdone, Valerio Mastandrea	Horror-comedy	based on the eponymous comic

== See also ==
- 2000 in Italy
- 2000 in Italian television
