= Enzo Monteleone =

Italian film director and screenwriter (born 1954)

- Born: 13 April 1954 (age 72); Padua, Italy

Enzo Monteleone (born 13 April 1954 in Padua, Italy) is an Italian film director and screenwriter.

== Career ==
Enzo Monteleone made his professional debut as a screenwriter with the screenplay of Hotel Colonial, an Italian-American co-production directed by Cinzia TH Torrini, and starring Robert Duvall, John Savage, Rachel Ward and Massimo Troisi. He has written four screenplays for director Gabriele Salvatores: Kamikazen: Last Night in Milan, Marrakech Express, Mediterraneo, which won an Oscar in 1992 for Best Foreign Film, and Puerto Escondido, as well as films for such directors as Carlo Mazzacurati, Giuseppe Piccioni, Alessandro D'Alatri, Maurizio Sciarra and Carlos Saura (¡Dispara!, starring Antonio Banderas and Francesca Neri.)

Monteleone's first film as a director was a biopic of the actor Alessandro Haber, The True Life of Antonio H., which was shown at the Venice Film Festival and which won the Italian Nastro d'Argento award for Best Actor.

The next film he directed was Outlaw (1999), which starred Stefano Accorsi and which was presented in competition at the 21st Moscow International Film Festival, received an award at the Annecy film festival in France, and was nominated for a 2000 Italian David di Donatello award.

In 2002 he directed the World War II drama El Alamein: The Line of Fire, which won three David di Donatello Awards (Best Cinematography, Best Editing, Best Sound), and one Nastro d'Argento for Best Sound.

In 2004, he directed Il Tunnel della Libertà (The Tunnel of Freedom), a television film for Canale 5 starring Kim Rossi Stuart, based on the true story of two Italian students who dug a tunnel under the Berlin Wall in 1962 and helped thirty East German citizens escape to the West. In 2007 he shot another project for Canale 5, the six part TV miniseries Il Capo dei Capi.

In 2009, he directed a comedy, The Ladies Get Their Say, written by Cristina Comencini and starring Margherita Buy, Isabella Ferrari, Paola Cortellesi and Marina Massironi and, in 2011, he directed a two-part TV series -- Walter Chiari - Fino all'Ultima Risata—for Rai Uno, starring Alessio Boni and based on the adventurous life of the well-known Italian actor Walter Chiari.

== Awards ==
=== Locarno Film Festival ===
- 2001: Pardo d'Oro for best film - Off to the Revolution by a 2CV

=== Fice Award ===
- 1994: Award for best direction - The True Life of Antonio H.

=== De Sica Award ===
- 2002: Award for best direction - El Alamein: The Line of Fire

== Filmography ==
=== Screenwriter ===
- Hotel Colonial, directed by Cinzia TH Torrini (1986)
- Kamikazen: Last Night in Milan, directed by Gabriele Salvatores (1987)
- Marrakech Express, directed by Gabriele Salvatores (1988)
- The Handsome Priest, directed by Carlo Mazzacurati (1989)
- La cattedra, directed by Michele Sordillo (1990)
- Mediterraneo, directed by Gabriele Salvatores (1991)
- Ask for the Moon, directed by Giuseppe Piccioni (1991)
- Red American, directed by Alessandro D'Alatri (1991)
- Puerto Escondido, directed by Gabriele Salvatores (1992)
- Bonus malus, directed by Vito Zagarrio (1993)
- ¡Dispara!, directed by Carlos Saura (1994)
- Free the Fish, directed by Cristina Comencini (1999)
- Off to the Revolution by a 2CV, directed by Maurizio Sciarra (2001)

=== Director ===
- The True Life of Antonio H. (1994)
- Interviste d'autore: Ettore Scola (1996)
- Beer & cigarettes, short film (1997)
- Wine & cigarettes, short film (1997)
- Outlaw (1999 film) (1999)
- Piazza Vittorio, documentary (2000)
- Sono solo un artigiano - Intervista a Suso Cecchi d'Amico, documentary (2001)
- I ragazzi di El Alamein, documentary (2001)
- El Alamein: The Line of Fire (2002)
- Tunnel della libertà, TV movie (2004)
- Il Capo dei Capi, 6 TV episodes (2007)
- The Ladies Get Their Say (2009)
- Walter Chiari - Fino all'ultima risata, TV miniseries (2012)
- Io Non Mi Arrendo (2016)
