= Bits and Pieces (1996 film) =

- Directed by: Antonello Grimaldi
- Cinematography: Alessandro Pesci
- Music by: Enzo Favata
- Distributed by: Columbia TriStar Films Italia
- Release date: 1996
- Running time: 110 minutes
- Country: Italy
- Language: Italian

Bits and Pieces, originally Il cielo è sempre più blu, is a 1996 Italian comedy-drama film directed by Antonello Grimaldi. The title of the film is a reference to a song by Rino Gaetano. The film depicts several short stories set in a single day in Rome.

== Cast ==
- Asia Argento
- Dario Argento
- Luca Lionello
- Luca Barbareschi
- Monica Bellucci
- Claudio Bisio
- Margherita Buy
- Antonio Catania
- Roberto Citran
- Iaia Forte
- Enrico Lo Verso
- Daniele Luchetti
- Ivano Marescotti
- Margaret Mazzantini
- Francesca Neri
- Andrea Occhipinti
- Silvio Orlando
- Sergio Rubini
- Gigio Alberti
- Carlo Croccolo
- Cecilia Dazzi
- Giannina Facio
- Nicola Farron
- Alessandro Haber
- Lucrezia Lante della Rovere
- Marino Masé
- Giulio Scarpati
- Gabriele Salvatores
- Monica Scattini
- Gianmarco Tognazzi
- Sergio Endrigo
- Alessandro Baricco
- Giuseppe Piccioni
- Massimo Wertmüller
- Gaia Zucchi
