= Giulio Scarpati =

Italian actor

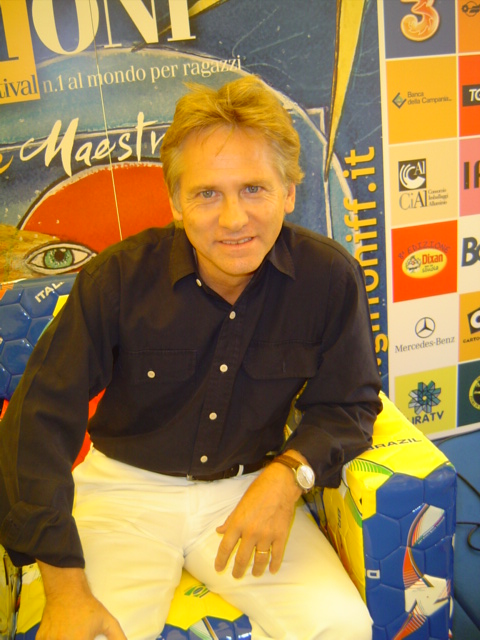
- Born: 20 February 1956 (age 70); Rome
- Occupation: Actor

Giulio Scarpati (born 20 February 1956) is an Italian actor.

== Life and career ==
Born in Rome, pretty active on stage, after several small film roles Scarpati had his breakout role in 1991 as Marco, the main character in the Giuseppe Piccioni's drama film Ask for the Moon. In 1994 he won a David di Donatello for best actor for his performance in Alessandro Di Robilant's Law of Courage. Scarpati later obtained a large popularity with the role of Lele Martini in the Rai Uno television series Un medico in famiglia.

Scarpati is married to the stage director Nora Venturini and has a son, Edoardo (27–05–1988), and a daughter, Lucia (27–11–1994). He also writes the sports column "Tribuna d'onore" for the newspaper La Repubblica.

== Selected filmography ==
- Ask for the Moon (1990)
- The Raffle (1991)
- Who Wants to Kill Sara? (1992)
- Gangsters (1992)
- Mario, Maria and Mario (1993)
- Law of Courage (1994)
- Who Killed Pasolini? (1995)
- Penniless Hearts (1996)
- Bits and Pieces (1996)
- Resurrection (2001)
- A luci spente (2004)
- Magical Nights (2018)
- Tutti per 1 - 1 per tutti (2020)
