= Against the Wind (2000 film) =

2000 film

- Italian: Controvento
- Directed by: Peter Del Monte
- Written by: Gloria Malatesta; Claudia Sbarigia; Peter Del Monte
- Starring: Margherita Buy; Valeria Golino; Ennio Fantastichini
- Cinematography: Saverio Guarna
- Edited by: Simona Paggi
- Music by: Paolo Silvestri
- Release date: 2000
- Country: Italy
- Language: Italian

Against the Wind (Italian: Controvento) is a 2000 Italian drama film co-written and directed by Peter Del Monte. It entered the Panorama section at the 51st Berlin International Film Festival.

== Plot ==
An unstable actress (Nina) and her repressed child-psychiatrist sister (Clara) fall in love with the same man (Leo).

== Cast ==
- Margherita Buy as Clara
- Ennio Fantastichini as Leo
- Valeria Golino as Nina
- Maria Monti as Mother
- Stefano Abbati as Attilio

== See also ==
- List of Italian films of 2000
