= Days and Clouds =

2007 Italian drama film

- Theatrical release poster
- Directed by: Silvio Soldini
- Written by: Silvio Soldini; Doriana Leondeff; Francesco Piccolo
- Produced by: Lionello Cerri
- Starring: Antonio Albanese; Margherita Buy; Alba Rohrwacher; Giuseppe Battiston
- Cinematography: Ramiro Civita
- Edited by: Carlotta Cristiani
- Music by: Giovanni Venosta
- Production companies: Lumiere & Co; Amka Films; RTSI Televisione svizzera
- Distributed by: Warner Bros. Pictures
- Release dates: 12 September 2007 (TIFF); 26 October 2007 (Italy)
- Running time: 118 minutes
- Country: Italy
- Language: Italian

Days and Clouds (Italian: Giorni e nuvole) is a 2007 Italian drama film directed by Silvio Soldini. It was entered into the 30th Moscow International Film Festival where Margherita Buy won the award for Best Actress.

== Plot ==
Set in Genoa, the film concerns the financial struggles and emotional strain that occur after Michele (Antonio Albanese) loses his job. He and his wife Elsa (Margherita Buy) are forced to give up their affluent lifestyle and cope with the tensions of moving into a smaller home, finding new work, and making sacrifices.

== Cast ==
- Margherita Buy as Elsa
- Antonio Albanese as Michele
- Giuseppe Battiston as Vito
- Alba Rohrwacher as Alice
- Carla Signoris as Nadia
- Fabio Troiano as Riki
- Paolo Sassanelli as Salviati
- Arnaldo Ninchi as Padre di Michele
- Teco Celio as Ragionier Terzetti
- Antonio Carlo Francini as Luciano
- Carlo Scola as Fabrizio
- Alberto Giusta as Roberto
