= The Ladies Get Their Say =

- Directed by: Enzo Monteleone
- Written by: Cristina Comencini; Enzo Monteleone
- Produced by: Marco Chimenz; Giovanni Stabilini; Riccardo Tozzi
- Starring: Margherita Buy; Isabella Ferrari; Marina Massironi; Paola Cortellesi; Carolina Crescentini; Valeria Milillo; Claudia Pandolfi; Alba Rohrwacher
- Cinematography: Daniele Nannuzzi
- Music by: Giuliano Taviani
- Distributed by: 01 Distribution
- Release date: 2009
- Running time: 94 minutes
- Country: Italy
- Language: Italian

The Ladies Get Their Say (Italian: Due partite) is a 2009 Italian comedy-drama film directed by Enzo Monteleone. It is based on the Cristina Comencini's stage play with the same name. It was nominated to four Silver Ribbon Awards (for best producer, best costumes, best set design, and to the whole cast for best supporting actresses) and to two David di Donatello (for best makeup and for best hairstyling).

== Plot ==
In two different eras, the film represents the feminine universe, as seen through the eyes of four women. Sofia, Beatrice, Claudia, and Gabriella, bourgeois housewives in Rome in 1966, meet each Thursday evening to play cards and talk about their problems and fears. Thirty years later, in 1996, their daughters (Rossana, Sara, Giulia, Cecilia) reunite after the death of Beatrice, who committed suicide as she claimed to be alone. Despite the modernity and emancipation, the fears and anguishes of the women aren't much different than 30 years prior.

== Cast ==
- Paola Cortellesi as Sofia
- Isabella Ferrari as Beatrice
- Marina Massironi as Claudia
- Margherita Buy as Gabriella
- Claudia Pandolfi as Rossana
- Alba Rohrwacher as Giulia
- Valeria Milillo as Cecilia
- Carolina Crescentini as Sara

== See also ==
- List of Italian films of 2009
