= An Eyewitness Account =

- Directed by: Pasquale Pozzessere
- Written by: Giacomo Scarpelli; Furio Scarpelli
- Starring: Fabrizio Bentivoglio; Claudio Amendola; Margherita Buy
- Cinematography: Luca Bigazzi
- Music by: Franco Piersanti
- Distributed by: Medusa
- Release date: 7 February 1997 (Italy)
- Running time: 90 minutes
- Language: Italian

An Eyewitness Account (Italian: Testimone a rischio, also known as Risking Witness and Witness in Danger) is a 1997 thriller-drama film directed by Pasquale Pozzessere. It is based on real life events of Sicilian Mafia hit eyewitness Piero Nava. For his performance Fabrizio Bentivoglio won the David di Donatello Award for best actor and the Ciak d'oro in the same category.

== Cast ==
- Fabrizio Bentivoglio as Pietro Nava
- Claudio Amendola as Sandro Nardella
- Margherita Buy as Franca Nava
- Pierfrancesco Pergoli as Luca Nava
- Maurizio Donadoni as Vincenzo Turrini
- Arnaldo Ninchi as Cataldi
- Sara Franchetti as Franca's Mother
- Biagio Pelligra as Police Commissioner De Lio

== Reception ==
The film opened in Italy on 26 screens and grossed $107,929 for the weekend, placing 14th at the box office.
