= Facciamo paradiso =

- Directed by: Mario Monicelli
- Written by: Mario Monicelli; Suso Cecchi d'Amico; Leonardo Benvenuti; Piero De Bernardi
- Starring: Margherita Buy; Lello Arena; Aurore Clément; Philippe Noiret
- Cinematography: Tonino Delli Colli
- Edited by: Ruggero Mastroianni
- Release date: 1995
- Running time: 108 minutes
- Country: Italy
- Language: Italian

Facciamo paradiso (also known as Looking for Paradise) is a 1995 Italian comedy-drama film directed by Mario Monicelli. It is based on a short story by Giuseppe Pontiggia.

== Plot ==
The film tells the story of Claudia Bertelli, a young Italian girl born after World War II, who takes place contestating in '68, along with the Communists, and then mother full of contradictions and doubts over the years of modernism. She dies in 2011, in an era full of crisis.

== Cast ==
- Margherita Buy: Claudia Bertelli
- Lello Arena: Calabrone
- Philippe Noiret: Padre di Claudia
- Aurore Clément: Madre di Claudia
- Dario Cassini: Lucio
- Barbara Marciano: Anita
- Gianfelice Imparato: Bellocchio
- Moni Ovadia: Adamo
- Marilù Prati: Teresa
- Mattia Sbragia: Detective
