= The Shadow of the Day =

Italian drama film

- Directed by: Giuseppe Piccioni
- Screenplay by: Giuseppe Piccioni; Gualtiero Rosella; Annick Emdin
- Produced by: Riccardo Scamarcio
- Starring: Riccardo Scamarcio; Benedetta Porcaroli
- Cinematography: Michele D'Attanasio
- Edited by: Esmeralda Calabria
- Music by: Michele Braga
- Production companies: Lebowski; Rai Cinema
- Release date: 24 February 2022 (Italy)
- Running time: 128 minutes
- Country: Italy
- Language: Italian
- Budget: €3.1 million

The Shadow of the Day (Italian: L'ombra del giorno) is a 2022 Italian romantic drama film written and directed by Giuseppe Piccioni, starring Riccardo Scamarcio and Benedetta Porcaroli, set in Italy in 1938. Piccioni wrote the screenplay with Gualtiero Rosella and Annick Emdin. It is produced by Scamarcio through his Lebowski production company, in association with Rai Cinema.

== Premise ==
Luciano (Scamarcio) runs a restaurant in a small Italian town. He is a decorated veteran of World War I, but was badly wounded and walks with a limp. He seems to sympathize with the Fascist regime but he is not a member of the party, and although he reprimands his kitchen staff for political insubordination he does not report them. A young educated Jewish woman Anna (Porcaroli) arrives at his restaurant begging him for work, but things get complicated when her husband, on run from the regime, arrives.

== Cast ==
- Riccardo Scamarcio as Luciano
- Benedetta Porcaroli as Anna
- Lino Musella as Osvaldo
- Vincenzo Nemolato as Giovanni
- Sandra Ceccarelli as Madre Corrado
- Valeria Bilello as Amelia
- Waël Sersoub as Emile

== Production ==
Writer-director Giuseppe Piccioni wrote the screenplay with Gualtiero Rosella and Annick Emdin. Riccardo Scamarcio stars and produces. The film was made on a €2.8 million ($3.1 million) budget, and produced by Scamarcio through Lebowski in association with Rai Cinema.

=== Filming ===
In January 2021, principal photography was announced to be concentrated in the Italian city of Ascoli Piceno. Filming began in March 2021. Filming locations include the Caffè Meletti which overlooks the Piazza del Popolo, the Via delle Stelle, the garden of Palazzo Saladini Pilastri, Tufillo Bridge and the Riserva Naturale Regionale Sentina.

== Release ==
The film had a premiere in the city of Ascoli Piceno on 23 February 2022, and was released national wide in Italy on February 24, 2022.

== Reception ==
Peter Bradshaw in The Guardian described it as “involving” and praised the performances of the lead actors. Bradshaw commented that it showed a “traditional kind of moviemaking, robustly made“.
