= It's Happening Tomorrow =

1988 film

- Film poster
- Directed by: Daniele Luchetti
- Written by: Franco Bernini; Daniele Luchetti
- Produced by: Marco Alfieri
- Starring: Paolo Hendel; Giovanni Guidelli; Margherita Buy; Claudio Bigagli; Quinto Parmeggiani; Giacomo Piperno; Gianfranco Barra; Angela Finocchiaro; Agnese Nano; Antonio Petrocelli; Nanni Moretti; Ugo Gregoretti
- Cinematography: Franco Di Giacomo
- Edited by: Angelo Nicolini
- Music by: Nicola Piovani
- Release date: 1988
- Running time: 87 minutes
- Country: Italy
- Language: Italian

It's Happening Tomorrow (Italian: Domani accadrà) is a 1988 Italian comedy film directed by Daniele Luchetti. It was screened in the Un Certain Regard section at the 1988 Cannes Film Festival.

== Cast ==
- Paolo Hendel as Lupo
- Giovanni Guidelli as Edo
- Margherita Buy as Vera
- Claudio Bigagli as Diego Del Ghiana
- Quinto Parmeggiani as Enea Silvio Di Lampertico
- Giacomo Piperno as Cesare Del Ghiana
- Dario Cantarelli as Abbé Flambert
- Gianfranco Barra as Biagio
- Angela Finocchiaro as Lady Rowena
- Agnese Nano as Allegra
- Antonio Petrocelli as Terminio
- Nanni Moretti as Matteo, the charcoal burner
- Ugo Gregoretti as Marquis Lucifero
- Peter Willburger as Katowitz
- Ciccio Ingrassia as Gianloreto Bonacci
