= Mia Madre =

2015 film

Mia madre
- Film poster
- Directed by: Nanni Moretti
- Screenplay by: Nanni Moretti; Valia Santella; Francesco Piccolo
- Story by: Gaia Manzini; Nanni Moretti; Valia Santella; Chiara Valerio
- Produced by: Nanni Moretti; Domenico Procacci
- Starring: Margherita Buy; John Turturro; Nanni Moretti; Giulia Lazzarini
- Cinematography: Arnaldo Catinari
- Edited by: Clelio Benevento
- Production companies: Arte France Cinéma; Fandango; Ifitalia; Le Pacte; Rai Cinema; Sacher Film
- Distributed by: 01 Distribution (Italy); Le Pacte (France)
- Release dates: 16 April 2015 (Italy); 16 May 2015 (Cannes); 2 December 2015 (France)
- Running time: 107 minutes
- Countries: Italy; France
- Languages: Italian; English

Mia madre (lit. '"My Mother"') is a 2015 internationally co-produced drama film directed by Nanni Moretti. It was selected to compete for the Palme d'Or at the 2015 Cannes Film Festival. It was screened in the Special Presentations section of the 2015 Toronto International Film Festival.

== Plot ==
Margherita is a director working on a social-realist film about a factory strike called Noi siamo qui (We Are Here), starring American actor Barry Huggins as the factory owner. Huggins consistently fails to deliver his lines properly and the fraught nature of the shoot is exacerbated by unhelpful advice from Margherita to her actors. She breaks up with her boyfriend, an actor in the film, and is divorced from the father of her daughter, Livia. Her brother Giovanni has taken time off work to help care for their ailing mother, Ada, a retired classics teacher who has been hospitalised. Margherita comes to feel guilty for not taking on more responsibility for her mother and reflects on her often cold relations with her family, friends and colleagues.

== Cast ==
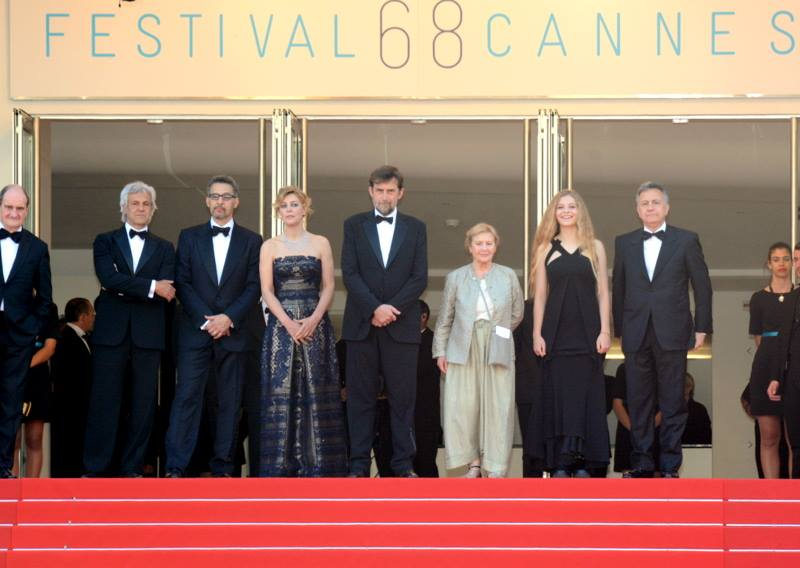
Cast and director at the 2015 Cannes Film Festival

- Margherita Buy as Margherita
- John Turturro as Barry Huggins
- Giulia Lazzarini as Ada
- Nanni Moretti as Giovanni
- Beatrice Mancini as Livia
- Stefano Abbati as Federico
- Enrico Ianniello as Vittorio
- Anna Bellato as Actor
- Toni Laudadio as Producer

== Reception ==
=== Critical response ===
Mia Madre has an approval rating of 84% on review aggregator website Rotten Tomatoes, based on 92 reviews, and an average rating of 7.3/10. The website's critical consensus states: "Mia Madre explores thought-provoking themes with director/co-writer Nanni Moretti's reliably skillful blend of comedy and pathos". Metacritic assigned the film a weighted average score of 70 out of 100, based on 25 critics, indicating "generally favorable reviews".

Les Cahiers du cinéma placed the film 1st in their 2015 Top Ten chart and featured Nanni Moretti on their November's cover.

=== Awards and nominations ===
Awards and nominations
Award	Category	Recipients and nominees	Result
70th Silver Ribbon Awards	Best Director	Nanni Moretti	Nominated
70th Silver Ribbon Awards	Best Producer	Nanni Moretti and Domenico Procacci	Nominated
70th Silver Ribbon Awards	Best Screenplay	Nanni Moretti, Valia Santella, and Francesco Piccolo	Nominated
70th Silver Ribbon Awards	Best Actress	Margherita Buy	Won
70th Silver Ribbon Awards	Best Editing	Clelio Benevento	Nominated
70th Silver Ribbon Awards	Best Sound	Alessandro Zanon	Nominated
70th Silver Ribbon Awards	Special Nastro d'Argento	Giulia Lazzarini	Won
68th Cannes Film Festival	Palme d'Or	Nanni Moretti	Nominated
68th Cannes Film Festival	Prize of the Ecumenical Jury		Won
60th David di Donatello Awards	Best Film	Nanni Moretti and Domenico Procacci	Nominated
60th David di Donatello Awards	Best Director	Nanni Moretti	Nominated
60th David di Donatello Awards	Best Script	Nanni Moretti, Valia Santella and Francesco Piccolo	Nominated
60th David di Donatello Awards	Best Producer	Nanni Moretti and Domenico Procacci	Nominated
60th David di Donatello Awards	Best Actress	Margherita Buy	Won
60th David di Donatello Awards	Best Supporting Actress	Giulia Lazzarini	Won
60th David di Donatello Awards	Best Supporting Actor	Nanni Moretti	Nominated
60th David di Donatello Awards	Best Makeup	Enrico Iacoponi	Nominated
60th David di Donatello Awards	Best Editing	Clelio Benevento	Nominated
60th David di Donatello Awards	Best Sound	Alessandro Zanon	Nominated
55th Globi d'oro	Best Film	Nanni Moretti	Nominated
55th Globi d'oro	Best Script	Nanni Moretti, Valia Santella, and Francesco Piccolo	Nominated
55th Globi d'oro	Best Actress	Margherita Buy	Nominated
30th Ciak d'oro	Best Director	Nanni Moretti	Won
30th Ciak d'oro	Best Actress	Margherita Buy	Won
30th Ciak d'oro	Best Supporting Actor	Nanni Moretti	Nominated
30th Ciak d'oro	Best Supporting Actress	Giulia Lazzarini	Won
30th Ciak d'oro	Best Producer	Nanni Moretti and Domenico Procacci	Nominated
30th Ciak d'oro	Best Screenwriter	Nanni Moretti, Valia Santella, and Francesco Piccolo	Nominated
30th Ciak d'oro	Best Sets and Decorations	Paola Bizzarri	Nominated
30th Ciak d'oro	Best Movie Poster	Internozero comunicazione	Nominated
28th European Film Awards	Best Director	Nanni Moretti	Nominated
28th European Film Awards	Best Actress	Margherita Buy	Nominated
