= These Days (film) =

2016 film

- Italian: Questi giorni
- Directed by: Giuseppe Piccioni
- Written by: Giuseppe Piccioni; Pierpaolo Pirone; Chiara Ridolfi
- Starring: Marta Gastini; Laura Adriani
- Cinematography: Claudio Cofrancesco
- Edited by: Alice Roffinengo
- Music by: Valerio C. Faggioni
- Release dates: 8 September 2016 (Venice); 15 September 2016 (Italy)
- Running time: 120 minutes
- Country: Italy
- Language: Italian

These Days (Italian: Questi giorni) is a 2016 Italian drama film directed by Giuseppe Piccioni. It was selected to compete for the Golden Lion at the 73rd Venice International Film Festival.

== Cast ==
- Laura Adriani as Angela
- Margherita Buy as Adria
- Giulio Corso as Valerio
- Marta Gastini as Caterina
- Caterina Le Caselle as Caterina
- Maria Roveran as Liliana
- Filippo Timi as Professor Mariani
- Sergio Rubini as Angela's father

== Reception ==
David Rooney of The Hollywood Reporter praised the role by Margherita Buy, saying that "[the film] makes you long for the clear-eyed introspection of the Nico song". Jay Weissberg of Variety wrote: "Four young women on the brink of adulthood make a road trip to Belgrade in this cliché-riddled piece of banality".
