= Penniless Hearts =

- Directed by: Giuseppe Piccioni
- Written by: Gualtiero Rosella; Giuseppe Piccioni
- Starring: Giulio Scarpati; Margherita Buy; Gene Gnocchi
- Cinematography: Camillo Bazzoni
- Music by: Daniele Silvestri
- Release date: 1996
- Country: Italy
- Language: Italian

Penniless Hearts (Italian: Cuori al verde, also known as Love, Money and Philosophy and Broke Hearts) is a 1996 Italian romantic comedy film written and directed by Giuseppe Piccioni.

== Cast ==
- Margherita Buy as Lucia
- Giulio Scarpati as Stefano
- Gene Gnocchi as Giulio
- Gaia De Laurentis as Martina
- Antonio Catania as Piero
- Delphine Telesio as Rebecca
- Piero Natoli as Marcello
- Paolo Maria Scalondro as Direttore banca
- Katarina Vasilissa as Caterina
