= Luca Bigazzi =

Italian cinematographer (born 1958)

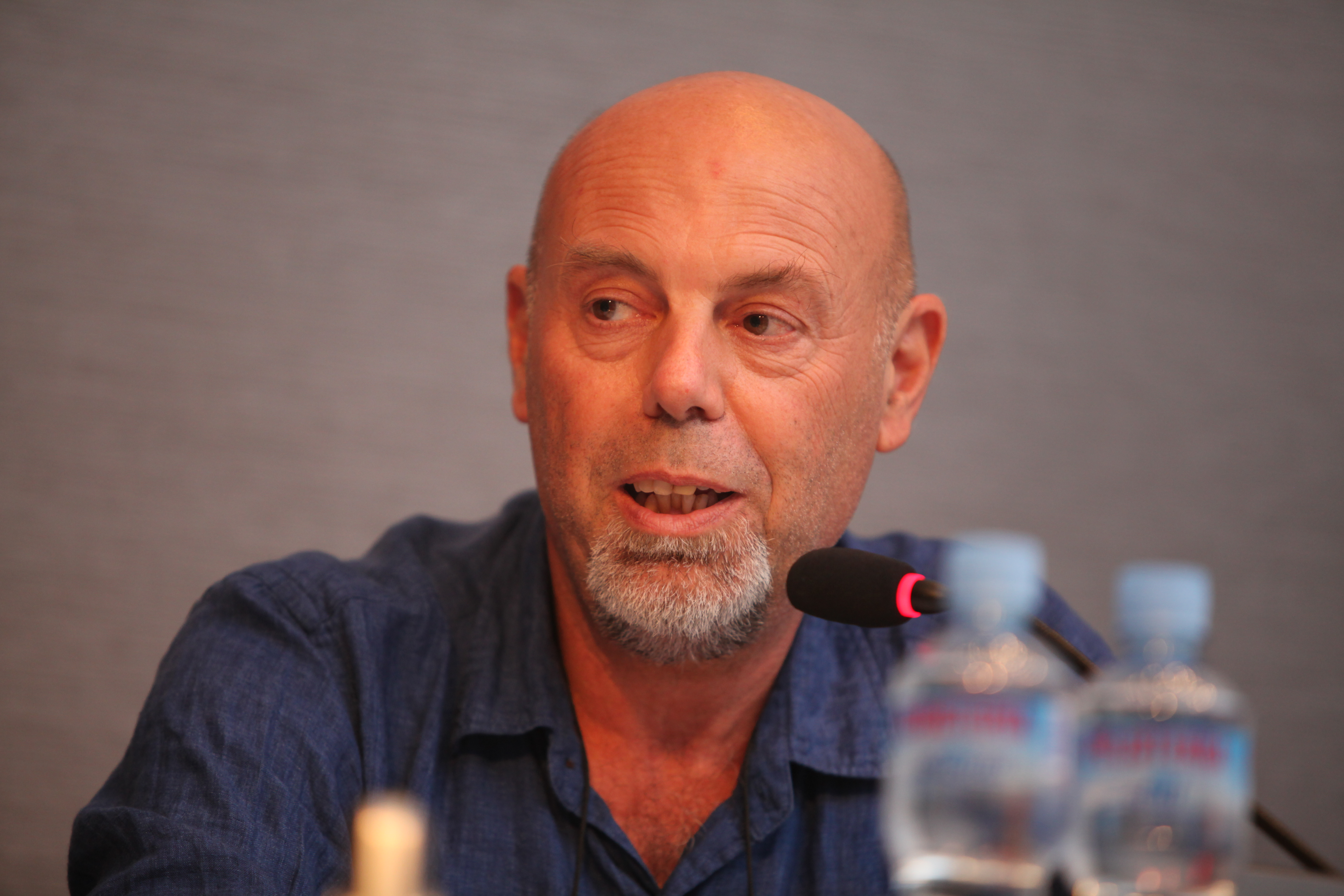
- Bigazzi in 2014
- Born: 9 December 1958 (age 67); Milan, Italy
- Occupation: Cinematographer
- Years active: 1977–present

Luca Bigazzi (born 9 December 1958) is an Italian cinematographer. He has won seven David di Donatello for Best Cinematography awards and received fourteen nominations, making him the highest awarded artist in this category. He is the first Italian cinematographer to be nominated for the Primetime Emmy Award in the Outstanding Cinematography for a Limited Series or Movie category, for the 2016 series The Young Pope by Paolo Sorrentino. He has worked with directors such as Silvio Soldini, Mario Martone, Felice Farina, Gianni Amelio, Francesca Archibugi, Michele Placido, Abbas Kiarostami, and Paolo Sorrentino.

== Career ==
Bigazzi started working in the advertising field in 1977 as assistant director, and at the same time he cultivated his passion for photography. He shifted to working in cinema in 1983, and his debut as director of photography was in that year's Silvio Soldini film Paesaggio con figure, which was screened at the Locarno Film Festival. Gradually, Bigazzi devoted himself more and more to cinema, abandoning the advertising field. His partnership with Soldini would continue in many other films, and he won his second David di Donatello award for 2000's Bread and Tulips. In 1994, he worked with Gianni Amelio on Lamerica, which won him his first David di Donatello as well as a Nastro d'Argento. In 1999, he was awarded the Osella d'oro award in Venice for The Way We Laughed by Amelio and Shooting the Moon by Francesca Archibugi. He has also collaborated with Mario Martone, Giuseppe Piccioni, and Ciprì & Maresco.

Bigazzi followed his early successes with work on Paolo Sorrentino's films, beginning with The Consequences of Love, for which he won the Nastro d'Argento in 2005, then The Family Friend (2006), Il divo (2008), This Must Be the Place (2011), for which he won a David di Donatello in 2012, The Great Beauty, winner of the Academy Award for Best International Feature Film in 2014, and finally Youth, which won best film at the European Film Awards in 2015.

Bigazzi collaborated with Francesca Comencini in 2001 on The Words of My Father and again in 2002 on the creation of the documentary Carlo Giuliani, Boy, which screened out of competition at the Cannes Film Festival that same year. The film addresses the death of Carlo Giuliani, who was killed in Genoa by a police officer during the demonstrations against the G8 in 2001.

== Selected filmography ==
- Paesaggio con figure (1983)
- The Peaceful Air of the West (1990 – L'aria serena dell'ovest)
- Death of a Neapolitan Mathematician (1992)
- A Soul Split in Two (1993 – Un'anima divisa in due)
- Lamerica (1994)
- Nasty Love (1995 – L'amore molesto)
- The Uncle from Brooklyn (1995)
- Un eroe borghese (1995)
- Luna e l'altra (1996)
- The Vesuvians (1997 – I vesuviani)
- An Eyewitness Account (1997 – Testimone a rischio)
- The Acrobats (1997)
- The Way We Laughed (1998 – Così ridevano)
- Shooting the Moon (1998 – L'albero delle pere)
- Fuori Dal Mondo (1999)
- Bread and Tulips (2000 – Pane e tulipani)
- I Prefer the Sound of the Sea (2000 – Preferisco il rumore del mare)
- The Words of My Father (2001 – Le parole di mio padre)
- Tomorrow (2001 – Domani)
- Burning in the Wind (2002 – Brucio nel vento)
- A Journey Called Love (2002 – Un viaggio chiamato amore)
- Carlo Giuliani, Boy (2002 – Carlo Giuliani, ragazzo)
- The Consequences of Love (2004 – Le conseguenze dell'amore)
- The Keys to the House (2004 – Le chiavi di casa)
- An Italian Romance (2004 – L'amore ritrovato)
- I Like to Work (Mobbing) (2004 – Mi piace lavorare (Mobbing))
- Ovunque sei (2004)
- Romanzo Criminale (2005)
- Mario's War (2005 – La guerra di Mario)
- Our Country (2006 – A casa nostra)
- The Family Friend (2006 – L'amico di famiglia)
- The Missing Star (2006 – La stella che non c'è)
- The Right Distance (2007 – La giusta distanza)
- The Trial Begins (2007 – L'ora di punta)
- Il Divo (2008)
- Giulia Doesn't Date at Night (2009 – Giulia non esce la sera)
- The White Space (2009 – Lo spazio bianco)
- Certified Copy (2010 – Copia conforme)
- La passione (2010)
- The Jewel (2011 – Il gioiellino)
- Shun Li and the Poet (2011 – Io sono Li)
- Kryptonite! (2011 – La kryptonite nella borsa)
- This Must Be the Place (2011)
- A Special Day (2012)
- First Snowfall (2013 – La prima neve)
- The Great Beauty (2013 – La grande bellezza)
- L'intrepido (2013)
- The Chair of Happiness (2013 – La sedia della felicità)
- Youth (2015 – Youth – La giovinezza)
- One Kiss (2016 – Un bacio)
- The Young Pope (2016)
- Tenderness (2017 – La tenerezza)
- Sicilian Ghost Story (2017)
- The Leisure Seeker (2017 – Ella & John – The Leisure Seeker)
- Loro (2018)
- Io sono Tempesta (2018)
- The New Pope (2019)
- Felicità (2023)

== Awards and recognition ==
- Primetime Emmy Award for Outstanding Cinematography for a Limited Series or Movie
  - The Young Pope (2017)
- David di Donatello for Best Cinematography
  - Lamerica (1995)
  - Bread and Tulips (2000)
  - The Consequences of Love (2005)
  - Romanzo Criminale (2006)
  - Il Divo (2009)
  - This Must Be the Place (2012)
  - The Great Beauty (2014)
- Nastro d'Argento for Best Cinematography
  - Lamerica (1995)
  - Burning in the Wind
  - The Keys to the House, The Consequences of Love, Ovunque sei (2005)
  - This Must Be the Place (2012)
  - The Great Beauty (2013)
  - Youth (2015)
  - Tenderness, Sicilian Ghost Story (2017)
- Giuseppe Rotunno award for best cinematography
  - Il Divo (2009)
  - The White Space (2010)
  - Shun Li and the Poet, This Must Be the Place, The Jewel (2012)
- Ciak award for best cinematography
  - Death of a Neapolitan Mathematician (1993)
  - Lamerica (1995)
  - Nasty Love, Lo zio di Brooklyn (1996)
  - The Way We Laughed, Fuori Dal Mondo (1999)
  - Bread and Tulips (2000)
  - The Family Friend, The Missing Star (2007)
  - This Must Be the Place, Shun Li and the Poet, Kryptonite! (2012)
  - The Great Beauty (2014)
  - Youth, One Kiss (2016)
  - Sicilian Ghost Story (2018)
- Globo d'oro award for best cinematography
  - Death of a Neapolitan Mathematician (1993)
  - Burning in the Wind (2002)
  - The Great Beauty (2013)
  - The Leisure Seeker – nomination (2018)
