= Paolo Hendel =

Italian actor, playwright and comedian

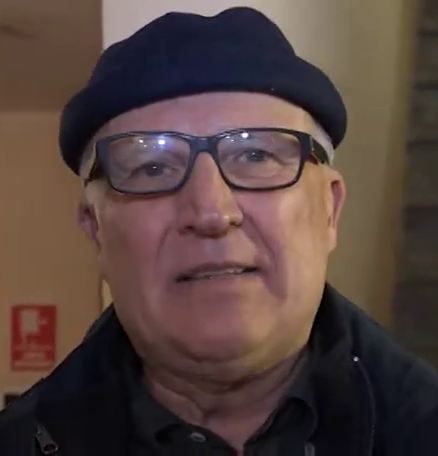
- Born: 2 January 1952 (age 73); Florence, Italy
- Occupation: Actor
- Height: 1.76 m (5 ft 9 in)

Paolo Hendel (born 2 January 1952) is an Italian actor, playwright and comedian.

== Life and career ==
Born in Florence, at a young age Hendel worked in several jobs, including gamekeeper, guardian of a garage and detective. He debuted as a comedian in early 1980s, as the sidekick of David Riondino. Shorty later he began an intense theatrical activity as author and actor of comic monologues, characterized by a satirical and surreal style.

Hendel started appearing on television in 1985. He gained popularity in 1996 with the Italia 1 variety show Mai dire Gol. There he created the successful character of "Carcarlo Pravettoni" a cynical capitalist who was candidate for mayor of Milan. Hendel also appeared in several films. He had a lead role in two films directed by Daniele Luchetti: It's Happening Tomorrow and The Week of the Sphinx.
