= The Place (film) =

- Theatrical release poster
- Directed by: Paolo Genovese
- Screenplay by: Paolo Genovese, Isabella Aguilar
- Based on: The Booth at the End by Christopher Kubasik
- Produced by: Marco Belardi
- Starring: Valerio Mastandrea; Marco Giallini; Alba Rohrwacher; Vittoria Puccini; Rocco Papaleo; Silvio Muccino; Silvia D'Amico; Vinicio Marchioni; Alessandro Borghi; Sabrina Ferilli; Giulia Lazzarini
- Cinematography: Fabrizio Lucci
- Edited by: Consuelo Catucci
- Music by: Maurizio Filardo
- Production companies: Medusa Film; Lotus Productions; Leone Film Group; Tornante Company
- Distributed by: Medusa Distribuzione
- Release date: 9 November 2017 (Italy)
- Running time: 105 minutes
- Country: Italy
- Language: Italian
- Box office: $5.8 million

The Place is a 2017 Italian neo-noir drama film directed by Paolo Genovese, who also co-authored the script. The film is a cinematographic adaptation of the 2010 American television series The Booth at the End created by Christopher Kubasik. The movie stars Marco Giallini, Alessandro Borghi, Sabrina Ferilli, Giulia Lazzarini, Vinicio Marchioni, Valerio Mastandrea, Silvio Muccino, Rocco Papaleo, Vittoria Puccini, and Alba Rohrwacher. The plot centers on a seemingly random group of nine people who want to fulfill their greatest wishes, so they enter into a Faustian pact with a mysterious man who is able to give them what they want in exchange for fulfilling his own requests.

== Plot ==
A mysterious man dressed in a business suit sits at the table in a cheap restaurant called "The Place" and is ready to listen to requests and wishes of various people coming to him. In return for the fulfillment of their requests, he makes his own demands, which often sound terrible or sometimes directly interfere with what he demanded from other visitors. While interviewing people, the man always keeps a thick, leather-covered notebook at ready, reading from it and writing the visitors' wishes with an expensive pen. Although the man declares that he does not set impossible tasks, each of his demands implies going against a number of basic ethical principles. The wishmaker also comments that the people are free to cancel the deal anytime they want.

Police officer Ettore, who needs to find the money stolen in a burglary, is asked to beat someone to blood. The nun Chiara, who has lost her faith in God and desperately wants to find it again, is invited to get pregnant. Mechanic Odoacre, in exchange for a night of sex with a model, is required to protect a child. Gigi is asked to kill this little girl to save the life of a seriously ill child. Old Marcella, in exchange for healing her husband's Alzheimer, must perpetrate a massacre in a crowded place with an explosive device that she must assemble herself. Young Martina has to commit a burglary for an exact value of 100,000 euros and 5 cents if she wants to become more beautiful. Blind Fulvio wants to regain his sight and is assigned to rape a woman. Azzurra must break up a married couple if she wants her husband to come back to her. Young Alex, the burglar whom police officer Ettore searches for, enters the deal with the man without taking it seriously and asks for his father (Ettore) to leave him alone forever.

Gradually, the lives of all the participants intertwines, sometimes making them to help each other and other times to fight with each other. The ultimate goal of the mysterious man, however, remains unknown until the café waitress Angela gets involved in the events, trying to understand the man's identity and motivation. The film ends with an episode in which the man confesses to Angela that he wants to stop doing what he does as he is very tired of his duty. Angela says that this is possible, takes his notebook, pulls out a pen, and starts writing—obviously assuming the man's role. In the last moments of the movie, the same table is shown at which the man sat the entire film. However, now the table is empty, and a page torn out from his notebook is burning in an ashtray as a symbol of his completed mission.

== Cast ==
- Valerio Mastandrea as The Mysterious Man
- Marco Giallini as Ettore
- Alba Rohrwacher as Chiara
- Vittoria Puccini as Azzurra
- Rocco Papaleo as Odoacre
- Silvio Muccino as Alex
- Silvia D'Amico as Martina
- Vinicio Marchioni as Gigi
- Alessandro Borghi as Fulvio
- Sabrina Ferilli as Angela
- Giulia Lazzarini as Marcella

== Release ==
The film premiered at the Rome Film Festival in 2017 and was released on Italian screens on 9

== Reception ==
Vittoria Scarpa of Cineuropa wrote "It’s been one of the most anticipated films of the season. Following the overwhelming success of Perfect Strangers, Paolo Genovese was in a position to do something daring and that he did, pulling an ambitious and metaphorical film out of his hat, which may not be for everyone, but in which he truly leaves comedy behind for the first time... A dialogue film, a test for its actors, and a conceptual "huis clos," which asks the audience one single yet weighty question: how far would you go to get what you want?"
