= The Ignorant Fairies =

2001 film by Ferzan Özpetek

- Directed by: Ferzan Özpetek
- Written by: Ferzan Özpetek; Gianni Romoli
- Produced by: Tilde Corsi; Gianni Romoli
- Starring: Margherita Buy; Stefano Accorsi; Serra Yilmaz; Gabriel Garko; Erika Blanc; Andrea Renzi; Koray Candemir
- Music by: Andrea Guerra
- Distributed by: Strand Releasing
- Release date: March 16, 2001 (Italy)
- Running time: 106 minutes
- Country: Italy
- Language: Italian
- Box office: $6 million (Italy)

The Ignorant Fairies (Italian: Le fate ignoranti; released on DVD in the US as His Secret Life) is a 2001 Italian drama film directed by Turkish-Italian film director Ferzan Özpetek.

The story follows a woman who discovers that her recently deceased husband had been having an affair with another man.

In 2022, Disney+ released a TV serialization of the film, directed once more by Özpetek.

== Plot ==
Antonia, a doctor specializing in AIDS treatment, and her husband Massimo live a seemingly perfect life. Antonia's quiet everyday life is irreparably changed when Massimo suddenly dies, run over by a car. Her violent detachment from her husband throws her into deep mourning that prevents her from working and challenges her relationship with her mother, also a long-time widow, even more difficult. Antonia receives personal objects from Massimo's office and discovers a painting, The Ignorant Fairy, with a declaration of love on the back. This leads her to search for the gift-giver, whose existence Antonia was unaware of.

Antonia discovers a reality very far from her imagination: Massimo was bisexual and had a clandestine relationship with a man, Michele. The impact with Massimo's secret life is dramatic for At first disbelieving, Michele pretends to be ignorant. Then he blames Antonia for all the sacrifices he made in order to be with Massimo. Antonia decides to meet Michele again to understand Massimo's life. An ambiguous friendship is established between the two, through which Antonia comes into contact with the colorful community to which Michele belongs: gay friends, a transgender woman, a Turkish refugee, the Turkish singer Emir and a true Neapolitan woman; a kind of extended family that lives in the attic of a public building located in one of the most characteristic neighborhoods of Rome, Ostiense.

Antonia begins to interact with the group constantly with the excuse of assisting Ernesto, a young friend of Michele's, who's HIV positive. Through the contact and impact with the reality represented by the group, mitigated by sharing the memory of Massimo, Antonia undergoes a process of personal maturation and liberation from her previous routine. She shares memories of Massimo with Michele. Both discover through the other the numerous lies that Massimo had told to lead the two parallel lives. The balance between the two is broken, when during a party, Antonia sees Michele flirting with two guys at the same time, which he will later have a ménage à trois. Michele feels it as an insult when Antonia presents him with a book by Nazım Hikmet, their favorite poet, which Massimo had pretended to appreciate in order to seduce Michele.

The feud between Antonia and Michele comes to an end when Ernesto runs away from home. Antonia finds him, remembering where he had met his lover and convinces Ernesto to take care of himself once and for all. Shortly after, Antonia and Michele exchange a passionate kiss, which sends both of them into crisis.

Antonia then discovers that she is pregnant with Massimo's child, and runs to Michele's house to give him the good news, but she overhears Michele talking to his friends, where he seems to want to distance himself from her. Antonia, saddened, decides to distance herself from Michele. She pretends to accept Emir's offer to travel, but instead, she leaves alone. The film ends with Antonia leaving secretly.

== Cast ==
- Margherita Buy as Antonia
- Stefano Accorsi as Michele
- Serra Yılmaz as Serra
- Gabriel Garko as Ernesto
- Erika Blanc as Veronica
- Andrea Renzi as Massimo
- Rosaria De Cicco as Luisella
- Koray Candemir as Emir
- Filippo Nigro as Riccardo
- Lucrezia Valia as Mara
- Ivan Bacchi as Luciano
- Luca Calvani as Sandro
- Carmine Recano as Israele

== Production ==
The director Ferzan Özpetek, born in Turkey in 1959, and who has lived in Italy since 1976, created The Ignorant Fairies to portray the theme of homosexuality, which he deeply felt on a personal level. In the film, he depicts loneliness, family, and detachment caused by loss. Co-produced with French capitals, the film is one of the hits of the 2001 film season.

Stefano Accorsi and Margherita Buy both received the Nastro d'argento as best male and female performers.

== Awards ==
- 3 Nastro d'Argento Prizes (Best Actress: Margherita Buy – Best Actor: Stefano Accorsi – Best Producer: Tilde Corsi and Gianni Romoli)
- Public's Choice, Image-Nation Festival
- Best Film, New York Gay and Lesbian Film Festival
- Best Film, Austin Gay and Lesbian International Film Festival
