= Condannato a nozze =

1993 film

- Italian poster
- Directed by: Giuseppe Piccioni
- Written by: Franco Bernini; Fabrizio Bettelli; Giuseppe Piccioni
- Produced by: Mario Cecchi Gori; Vittorio Cecchi Gori; Gaetano Daniele
- Starring: Sergio Rubini; Margherita Buy; Valeria Bruni Tedeschi; Patrizia Piccinini; Asia Argento
- Cinematography: Roberto Meddi
- Edited by: Esmeralda Calabria
- Music by: Antonio Di Pofi
- Distributed by: Variety Distribution
- Release date: 1993
- Country: Italy
- Language: Italian

Condannato a nozze (also known as Diary of a Man Condemned to Marriage) is a 1993 Italian comedy film directed by Giuseppe Piccioni. It entered the Panorama section at the 50th Venice International Film Festival.

== Cast ==
- Sergio Rubini: Roberto
- Margherita Buy: Sandra
- Valeria Bruni Tedeschi: Gloria
- Asia Argento: Olivia
- Patrizia Piccinini: Enrica
- Patrizia Sacchi: Psychoanalyst
- Enzo Cannavale: Doorman

== Production ==
During filming, then 17-year-old Asia Argento began a love affair with Sergio Rubini, who at the time was married to Margherita Buy.

== See also ==
- List of Italian films of 1993
