= Ask for the Moon =

1991 film

- Directed by: Giuseppe Piccioni
- Written by: Franco Bernini; Enzo Monteleone; Giuseppe Piccioni
- Starring: Margherita Buy; Giulio Scarpati
- Cinematography: Roberto Meddi
- Music by: Antonio Di Pofi
- Release date: 1991
- Country: Italy
- Language: Italian

Ask for the Moon (Italian: Chiedi la luna) is a 1991 Italian comedy drama film directed by Giuseppe Piccioni. It premiered at the 48th Venice International Film Festival.

== Cast ==
- Giulio Scarpati as Marco
- Margherita Buy as Elena Bacchelli
- Roberto Citran as Francesco
- Daniela Giordano as Daniela
- Massimo Lodolo as Emilio
- Sergio Rubini as Hitchhiker
