= The Week of the Sphinx =

- Directed by: Daniele Luchetti
- Written by: Daniele Luchetti; Franco Bernini; Angelo Pasquini
- Produced by: Matt Robinson; Angelo Rizzoli
- Starring: Margherita Buy; Paolo Hendel; Silvio Orlando; Delia Boccardo
- Cinematography: Antonio Nardi
- Music by: Dario Lucantoni
- Release date: 1990
- Language: Italian

La settimana della Sfinge (released as The Week of the Sphinx) is a 1990 Italian comedy-drama film co-written and directed by Daniele Luchetti. For her role Margherita Buy was awarded best actress at the San Sebastián International Film Festival.

== Plot ==
Gloria is a young waitress who works in a restaurant, has a passion for puzzles and daydreams; the girl delights, causing the ire of her boss, in posing various riddles to the customers, without however anyone being able to solve them. One day Aeolus arrives for lunch, an antenna player with a reputation as a womanizer, and manages to win Gloria's heart; but Aeolus, allergic to lasting relationships, leaves the girl after only one night together, without even saying goodbye.

Gloria, seduced and abandoned, quits her job and sets out in search of her beloved. He travels all over Italy, crossing seas and mountains, beaches and convents, getting to know all kinds of humanity. After a long chase, the girl finally manages to find Aeolus, who, struck by her determination, falls in love with her in turn. But by now it's too late: Gloria, having reached her goal, runs away, returning to be a waitress and to dream of a new adventure.

== Cast ==
- Margherita Buy as Gloria
- Paolo Hendel as Eolo
- Silvio Orlando as Ministro
- Isaac George as Ferruccio
- Delia Boccardo as Sara
- Roberto Nobile as Police Commissioner
- Corso Salani as Gommista

== See also ==
- List of Italian films of 1990
