= The White Space =

- Directed by: Francesca Comencini
- Written by: Francesca Comencini; Federica Pontremoli
- Produced by: Domenico Procacci
- Starring: Margherita Buy
- Cinematography: Luca Bigazzi
- Music by: Nicola Tescari
- Production company: Fandango
- Distributed by: 01 Distribution
- Release date: 2009
- Country: Italy
- Language: Italian

The White Space (Italian: Lo spazio bianco) is a 2009 Italian drama film directed by Francesca Comencini. It entered the main competition at the 66th Venice International Film Festival.

== Cast ==
- Margherita Buy as Maria
- Giovanni Ludeno as Fabrizio
- Gaetano Bruno as Giovanni Berti
- Maria Paiato as Magistrata
- Antonia Truppo| as Mina
- Guido Caprino as Pietro

== Production ==
First time Margherita Buy undresses in front of the camera. To combat embarrassment, the director Francesca Comencini also undressed completely during the shoot, so as to put Buy at ease.

== See also ==
- List of Italian films of 2009
