= Giulia Lazzarini =

Italian actress

Giulia Lazzarini (born 24 March 1934) is an Italian actress.

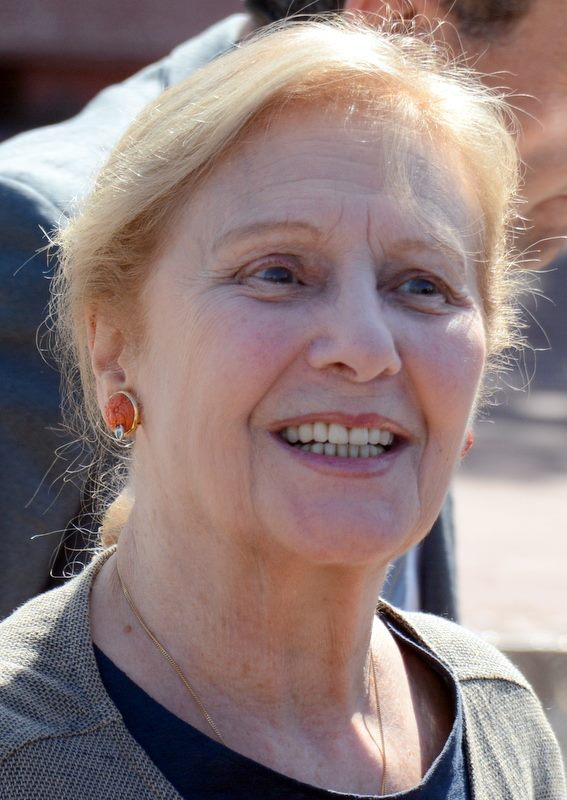
Giulia Lazzarini at 2015 Cannes Film Festival.

Her film credits include Mia Madre and Piazza Fontana: The Italian Conspiracy. Her television credits include La donna di picche and Capitan Fracassa.

In 2015 she won the David di Donatello for Best Supporting Actress and the Golden Ciak for Best Supporting Actress for her role in Mia Madre.

== Selected filmography ==
- Destiny (1951)
- Prisoners of Darkness (1952)
- I Made a Splash (1980)
- Amanti e Segreti (2004)
- Piazza Fontana: The Italian Conspiracy (2012)
- Mia Madre (2015)
- The Place (2017)
- A Hundred Sundays (2023)
- The Illusion (2025)
