= Annibale Ninchi =

Italian actor, playwright and drama teacher

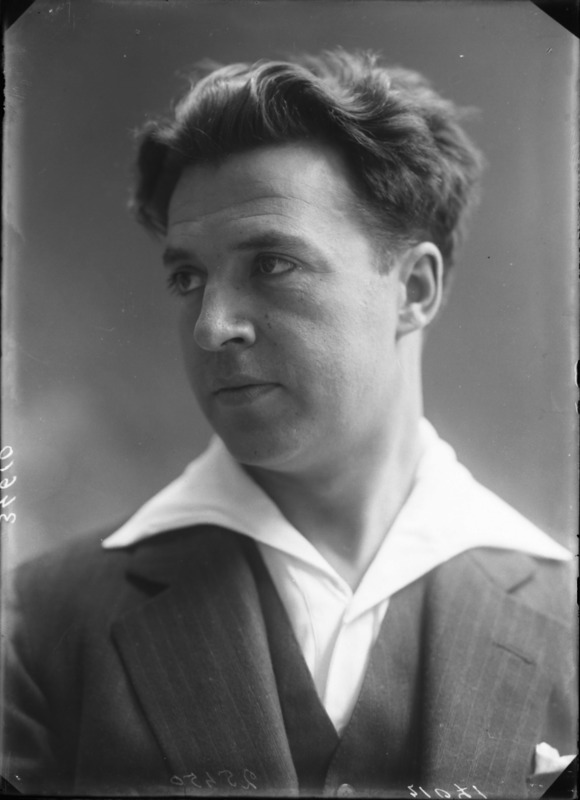
- Born: 20 November 1887; Bologna, Italy
- Died: 15 January 1967 (aged 79); Pesaro, Italy
- Occupation: Actor

Annibale Ninchi (20 November 1887 – 15 January 1967) was an Italian actor, playwright and drama teacher. He was the progenitor of a well-known family of actors.

== Life and career ==
Born in Bologna, the son of an army colonel, Ninchi trained at the drama school of Luigi Rasi. He made his stage debut with Ermete Zacconi, and later became one of the major names of the Italian theatre of the time, working among others with Emma Gramatica, Ruggero Ruggeri, Maria Melato, Giovanna Scotto, Cele Abba, and forming his own theatrical company in 1919. After the World War II he collaborated as a teacher with the Pesaro drama school and with the Accademia Nazionale di Arte Drammatica Silvio D'Amico, and worked on stage with Vittorio Gassman, Luigi Squarzina, Luchino Visconti and Anna Proclemer.

Active in films since 1909, Ninchi is best known, ironically, for playing the title role in Carmine Gallone's fascist era kolossal Scipio Africanus: The Defeat of Hannibal; he is also well known for the character roles he played in his late years in Federico Fellini's La Dolce Vita and 8½. He was the older brother of Carlo Ninchi, the cousin of Ave Ninchi, the uncle of Alessandro Ninchi and Annie Ninchi, and the father of Arnaldo Ninchi.
