= Ferzan Özpetek =

Turkish-Italian director (born 1959)

Ferzan Özpetek OMRI
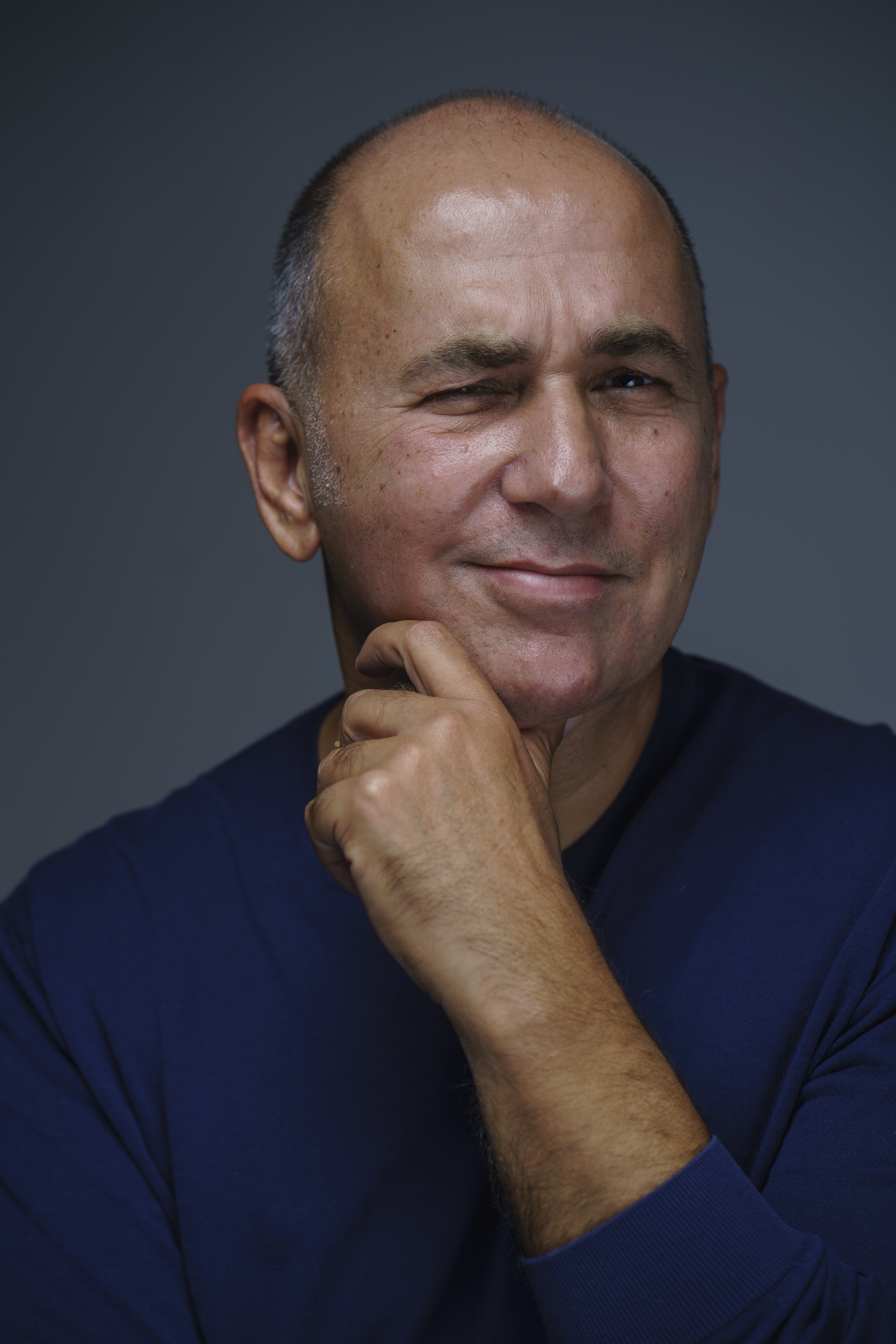
- Özpetek in 2020
- Born: 3 February 1959 (age 67); Kadıköy, Istanbul, Turkey
- Citizenship: Turkey; Italy
- Education: Sapienza University of Rome; Accademia Nazionale d'Arte Drammatica Silvio D'Amico
- Occupation: Filmmaker
- Years active: 1990–present
- Spouse: Simone Pontesilli (m. 2016)

Ferzan Özpetek (Turkish: [ˈfæɾzan ˈœspetec], Italian: [ˈfɛrdzan ˈɔtspetek, - ˈøts-]; born 3 February 1959) is a Turkish-Italian film director and screenwriter, residing in Italy since the 1970s.

== Biography ==
Ferzan Özpetek was born in Istanbul in 1959. In 1976, he decided to move to Italy to study Cinema History at Sapienza University of Rome. He completed his education attending art history and costume design classes at the Navona Academy. He also attended director classes at the Silvio D'Amico National Academy of Dramatic Art.

After receiving stage experience with Julian Beck's Living Theatre, he moved to the cinema landscape, by working as a director assistant to Massimo Troisi, Maurizio Ponzi, Ricky Tognazzi, Sergio Citti and Francesco Nuti. His first work was as Troisi's assistant director for Scusate il ritardo, followed by Ponzi's Sono contento, where he had a small role performing as a madonnaro.

His directorial debut was with Hamam, an Italian, Spanish and Turkish co-production. The movie, released in May 1997, was presented at the 50th edition of the Cannes Film Festival in the Quinzaine des Realisateurs session. The movie was presented in other international festivals and was sold for distribution in more than 20 countries around the world.

In 1999, he directed Harem Suare, set in his native land of Turkey, telling the tormented love story between the sultan's favourite, Safiye, and the eunuch Nadir, with the fall of the Ottoman Empire in the background. The story was written by Özpetek himself in collaboration with Gianni Romoli, who also produced the movie with Tilde Corsi and their R&C Production company. The film was presented in the Un Certain Regard section at the Cannes Film Festival, as well as at the London Film Festival and at the Toronto International Film Festival.

In 2001, Özpetek directed The Ignorant Fairies (Le fate ignoranti), starring Margherita Buy and Stefano Accorsi, a sweet and easy to watch drama about homosexuality and bonding and friendship of several kinds of outsiders. The movie won numerous awards including three Globo d'oro and four Nastro d'Argento awards.

Facing Windows (La finestra di fronte) was released in 2003. It starred Giovanna Mezzogiorno, Raoul Bova, Filippo Nigro and Massimo Girotti, in what turned out to be his last performance on film. The film won multiple awards including: five David di Donatello, four Ciak d'Oro and three Globo d'oro awards. The film's success in Italy and the rest of Europe, led it to be distributed by Sony Pictures Classics in North America.

Once again pairing up with producers Gianni Romoli and Tilde Corsi, in 2005, Özpetek directed Sacred Heart, which received 12 nominations at the David di Donatello awards, where Barbora Bobuľová won the Best Actress award. The film also won the award for production design.

His next film, Saturn in Opposition, was released in 2007. It featured a very rich cast: Pierfrancesco Favino, Luca Argentero, Isabella Ferrari and Ambra Angiolini, and also Margherita Buy and Stefano Accorsi with whom he worked earlier, in Le fate ignoranti. The movie won four Ciak d'oro, five Globo d'oro and four Nastro d'Argento awards. Angiolini, in her acting debut, won the David di Donatello award for the Best Actress in a Supporting Role.

That same year, Özpetek served on the jury at the 64th Venice International Film Festival. He also directed commercial ads, including a spot for the AIRL (the Italian association for cancer research) that featured Isabella Ferrari.

In 2008, Özpetek started a new partnership with Domenico Procacci's company, Fandango. Un Giorno Perfetto, a novel by Melania Gaia Mazzucco, starred Isabella Ferrari and Valerio Mastandrea, and marked the first time Özpetek worked with a story not his own. Presented at the 65th Venice International Film Festival, it grossed 3 million euros at the box-office.

In 2008, the Museum of Modern Art in New York City, dedicated a retrospective on him, screening all of his movies. He has been one of the few Italian directors to be given this honour.

In April 2009, he directed a short movie called Nonostante tutto è Pasqua (Despite Everything it's Easter), a segment of the project L'Aquila 2009 - Cinque registi tra le macerie, in which multiple directors took on subjects regarding the 2009 L'Aquila earthquake. Özpetek's short was dedicated to Alessandra Cora, an aspiring singer who died in her house's rubble.

His next film Loose Cannons was released in 2010. It was co-written with Ivan Cotroneo and stars Riccardo Scamarcio, Alessandro Preziosi, Nicole Grimaudo and Ennio Fantastichini. It is a comedy concerning the family issues of a household in Lecce. This is one of the few movies Özpetek has set outside Rome, a city very close to his heart. On 22 May 2010 the city of Lecce declared Özpetek honorary citizen.

The movie was presented out of competition at the 70th edition of the Berlinale as well as at the Tribeca Film Festival 2010, getting a special recognition of the jury.

In 2011, he was asked to direct Giuseppe Verdi's "La traviata" at San Carlo Opera House, and performed in December 2012, starring Carmen Giannattasio and Saimir Pirgu. It filmed for TV by Unitel Classica, and Pal DVD release in Italian company CG Entertainment (2015).

== Filmography ==
=== Film ===
Year	Title	Director	Writer	Producer	Actor	Role	Notes
1983	Son contento	No	No	No	Yes	Madonnaro Painter	
1997	Hamam	Yes	Yes	No	No	None	Winner – Golden Orange for Best Director at Antalya Golden Orange Film Festival; Winner – Golden Orange for Best Film at Antalya Golden Orange Film Festival
1999	Harem Suare	Yes	Yes	No	No	None	
2001	The Ignorant Fairies	Yes	Yes	No	No	None	Winner – Nastro d'Argento for Best Script; Winner – Globo d'oro for Best Director; Winner – Sebastiane Award at San Sebastián International Film Festival; Winner – Flaiano Award for Best Director
2003	Facing Windows	Yes	Yes	No	No	None	Winner – David di Donatello for Best Film; Winner – Nastro d'Argento for Best Script; Winner – Globo d'oro for Best Film; Winner – Globo d'Oro for Best Screenplay; Winner – Ciak d'oro for Best Film; Winner – Crystal Globe at Karlovy Vary International Film Festival
2005	Sacred Heart	Yes	Yes	No	No	None	Winner – Globo d'oro for Best Director
2007	Saturn in Opposition	Yes	Yes	No	No	None	Winner – Nastro d'Argento for Best Screenplay; Winner – Globo d'oro for Best Director; Winner – Globo d'oro for Best Screenplay; Winner – Ciak d'oro for Best Director
2008	A Perfect Day	Yes	Yes	No	No	None	
2009	L'Aquila 2009 – Cinque registi tra le macerie	Yes	No	No	No	None	Short film
2010	Loose Cannons	Yes	Yes	No	No	None	Winner – Nastro d'Argento for Best Comedy Film; Winner – Globo d'oro for Best Director; Winner – Globo d'oro for Best Screenplay; Winner – Jury's Special Award at Tribeca Festival; Winner – Mario Monicelli Award at Bari International Film Festival; Winner – Ciak d'oro for Best Film
2010	Francesco Nuti… e vengo da lontano	No	No	No	Yes	Himself	Documentary
2012	Magnificent Presence	Yes	Yes	No	No	None	Winner – Nastro d'Argento for Best Script; Winner – Ciak d'oro for Best Director
2014	Fasten Your Seatbelts	Yes	Yes	No	No	None	
2017	Red Istanbul	Yes	Yes	No	No	None	
2017	Naples in Veils	Yes	Yes	No	No	None	Winner – Flaiano Award for Best Director
2018	Cebimdeki Yabanci	No	No	Yes	No	None	
2019	The Goddess of Fortune	Yes	Yes	No	No	None	Winner – Ciak d'oro for Best Film
2023	Istanbul Trilogy: Meze	Yes	Yes	No	No	None	Short film
2023	Istanbul Trilogy: Music	Yes	Yes	No	No	None	Short film
2023	Istanbul Trilogy: Muhabbet	Yes	Yes	No	No	None	Short film
2023	Nuovo Olimpo	Yes	Yes	No	No	None	Winner – Ciak d'oro for Best Director
2024	Diamonds	Yes	Yes	No	Yes	Himself	Winner – Viewer's Award at David di Donatello; Winner – Nastro d'Argento of the Year at Nastro d'Argento
2025	Siblings	No	No	No	Yes	Himself	Cameo appearance
TBA	Nella gioia e nel dolore †	Yes	Yes	Yes	No	None	In production

=== Television ===
Year	Title	Notes
2022	The Ignorant Angels	Co-creator and showrunner; also directed 4 episodes and co-wrote episode: "L'altrove"

=== Assistant director ===
- Il tenente dei carabinieri (1986)
- Il maestro del terrore (The Prince of Terror- 1988, TV)
- La Scorta (The Bodyguards, 1993)
- Anche i commercialisti hanno un'anima (1994)
- Il Branco (1994)

== Novels ==
- Rosso Istanbul (2013), Mondadori. ISBN 978-88-04-63346-4.
- Sei la mia vita (2015), Mondadori. ISBN 978-88-04-65301-1.
- Come un respiro (2020), Mondadori, ISBN 978-88-04-71985-4.

== Awards ==
Only awards won for best direction or best film are included.

- Facing Windows:
  - David di Donatello Award
    - Best film
  - Scholars Jury Award
    - Best Direction
  - Italian National Syndicate of Film Journalists
    - Best Original Story (together with Gianni Romoli)
  - Karlovy Vary International Film Festival
    - Best Direction
    - Crystal Globe for Ferzan Özpetek
  - Bangkok International Film Festival
    - Best Film
  - Foyle Film Festival
    - Best Feature
  - Rehoboth Beach Independent Film Festival, Audience Award
    - Best Feature
  - Seattle International Film Festival
    - Best film
- Hamam (Il bagno turco)
  - Golden Orange (Antalya International Film Festival)
    - Best film
    - Best direction
  - Italian National Syndicate of Film Journalists Silver Ribbon award
    - Best Producer
- The Ignorant Fairies (Le fate ignoranti)
  - Austin Gay & Lesbian International Film Festival
    - Best Feature
  - New York Lesbian and Gay Film Festival
    - Best Feature

- 2008. Italian Medal of Merit

== Other sources ==
- Biyografi.net - Biography of Ferzan Özpetek
- Biyografi.info - Biographies : Ferzan Özpetek

Awards
Preceded by Tunç Başaran	Golden Orange Award for Best Director; 1997 for Hamam	Succeeded by Ömer Kavur
