= Saturn in Opposition =

- Italian film poster
- Directed by: Ferzan Özpetek
- Written by: Ferzan Özpetek; Gianni Romoli
- Produced by: Tilde Corsi; Gianni Romoli
- Starring: Stefano Accorsi; Margherita Buy; Pierfrancesco Favino; Serra Yılmaz; Ennio Fantastichini; Ambra Angiolini; Luca Argentero; Filippo Timi; Michelangelo Tommaso; Milena Vukotic; Luigi Diberti; Lunetta Savino; Isabella Ferrari
- Cinematography: Gian Filippo Corticelli
- Edited by: Patrizio Marone
- Music by: Neffa
- Release date: 23 February 2007
- Running time: 110 minutes
- Countries: Italy; Turkey
- Language: Italian

Saturn in Opposition (Italian: Saturno contro) is a 2007 Italian-Turkish drama film directed by Ferzan Özpetek. The Turkish title is Bir ömür yetmez. It had its United States premiere at Frameline in San Francisco on 20 June 2008.

== Plot ==
A group of very close friends live in Rome and cope with the sudden death of one of their members. The original group, who have been together for many years, are two straight couples, Antonio and Angelica, and Roberto and Neval; and a gay couple now separated, Sergio and Davide, a successful author. Relatively new additions to the group are Davide's current lover Lorenzo and Lorenzo's friend Roberta. Early in the movie a final member is added to the group: Paolo, an aspiring writer who is an acquaintance of Lorenzo and Roberta.

Although the members of the group love each other and spend much time together, there are tensions both within the group and within the three couples who make up the group. Antonio and Angelica seem to be a perfect couple, but their two young children are dysfunctional, and Antonio has been having a secret affair with Laura, a married woman with teenage children. Roberto feels like an outsider, because while Neval is a core member of the group he is not. And although Davide and Lorenzo look like the epitome of a beautiful, affluent gay couple, Paolo's entry into the group stirs up hidden currents of competition and infidelity that begin to test the relationship.

During a dinner party in Davide's apartment, Lorenzo without warning suffers an aneurysm and falls into a coma from which he does not recover. His friends are deeply shaken by his death; problems that have until then been hidden begin to emerge and threaten to destroy the group; and Davide almost commits suicide. They all finally convene at Davide's retreat in the mountains overlooking the sea and come to terms with one another and Lorenzo's death.

== Cast ==
- Stefano Accorsi as Antonio
- Margherita Buy as Angelica
- Serra Yilmaz as Neval
- Filippo Timi as Roberto
- Pierfrancesco Favino as Davide
- Ennio Fantastichini as Sergio
- Luca Argentero as Lorenzo
- Ambra Angiolini as Roberta
- Michelangelo Tommaso as Paolo
- Isabella Ferrari as Laura, a florist, Antonio's secret mistress
- Milena Vukotic as Marta, head nurse in the hospital where Lorenzo dies
- Benedetta Gargari as Giulia

== Awards ==
- David di Donatello: Best Supporting Actress (Ambra Angiolini)
- Nastro d'Argento: Best Script (Ferzan Özpetek), Best Supporting Actress (Ambra Angiolini), Best Actress (Margherita Buy), Best Song (Neffa)
