= Giulia Doesn't Date at Night =

2009 film

- DVD cover
- Directed by: Giuseppe Piccioni
- Starring: Valerio Mastandrea; Valeria Golino
- Cinematography: Luca Bigazzi
- Music by: Baustelle
- Release date: 27 February 2009
- Running time: 105 minutes
- Country: Italy
- Language: Italian

Giulia Doesn't Date at Night (Italian: Giulia non esce la sera) is a 2009 Italian drama film directed by Giuseppe Piccioni and starring Valerio Mastandrea as Guido and Valeria Golino as the title character, Giulia. It was shot in Rome during the summer of 2008 under its working title "Il premio". The film won the Nastro d'Argento for best original song (the song "Piangi Roma" by Baustelle).

== Cast ==
- Valerio Mastandrea: Guido
- Valeria Golino: Giulia
- Sonia Bergamasco: Benedetta
- Lidia Vitale: Female Agent
- Chiara Nicola: Viola
- Paolo Sassanelli: Bruno
- Antonia Liskova: Eva
- Domiziana Cardinali: Costanza
- Jacopo Domenicucci: Filippo
- Piera Degli Esposti: Attilia
