= Not of this World (film) =

1999 Italian drama film

Not of this world
- Directed by: Giuseppe Piccioni
- Produced by: Lionello Cerri
- Starring: Margherita Buy; Silvio Orlando
- Cinematography: Luca Bigazzi
- Edited by: Esmeralda Calabria
- Music by: Ludovico Einaudi
- Release date: 26 March 1999 (Italy)
- Running time: 100 minutes
- Country: Italy
- Language: Italian

Not of this World or Fuori Dal Mondo (lit. "outside the world") is a 1999 Italian drama film directed by Giuseppe Piccioni. Although selected as the Italian entry for the Best Foreign Language Film at the 72nd Academy Awards, it was not nominated.

== Plot ==
The film follows a nun whose life is upended when she is handed an abandoned infant in a park. She takes the baby to the hospital and proceeds to track down the mother. Along the way she meets the owner of a dry cleaning business whose sweater was wrapped around the baby, and begins to wonder if convent life is right for her.

== Cast ==
- Margherita Buy: Sister Caterina
- Silvio Orlando: Ernesto
- Carolina Freschi: Teresa
- Maria Cristina Minerva: Esmeralda
- Giuliana Lojodice: Caterina's Mother
- Chantal Ughi

== Reception ==
Not of this World has an approval rating of 77% on review aggregator website Rotten Tomatoes, based on 13 reviews, and an average rating of 7.5/10.

== Soundtrack ==
The soundtrack was composed by Ludovico Einaudi.

=== Track listing ===
No.	Title	Performed by	Length
1.	"Fuori Dal Mondo"	Ludovico Einaudi
2.	"Viaggio 2"	Ludovico Einaudi
3.	"Passaggio"	Ludovico Einaudi
4.	"Interludio 1"	Ludovico Einaudi
5.	"Promessa"	Ludovico Einaudi
6.	"Rockabilly Roadhouse"	Billy Roues
7.	"Interludio 3""	Ludovico Einaudi
8.	"Fuori Dalla Notte"	Ludovico Einaudi
9.	"Cadenza"	Ludovico Einaudi
10.	"Alta Pressione"	Ludovico Einaudi

== See also ==
- List of submissions to the 72nd Academy Awards for Best Foreign Language Film
- List of Italian submissions for the Academy Award for Best Foreign Language Film
