= Margherita Buy =

Italian actress (born 1962)

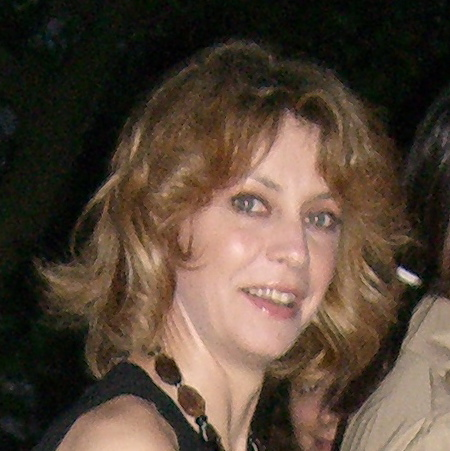
- Buy in June 2008
- Born: 15 January 1962 (age 64); Rome, Italy
- Occupation: Actress
- Years active: 1983–present
- Height: 1.70 m (5 ft 7 in)
- Spouse: Sergio Rubini (m. 1991; div. 1993)
- Children: 1
- Awards: David di Donatello; Best Actress; 1991: The Station; 1999: Not of this World; 2008: Days and Clouds; 2013: A Five Star Life; 2015: My Mother; Best Supporting Actress; 2004: Caterina in the Big City; 2005: Manual of Love Nastro d'Argento; Best Actress; 1991: The Station; 2001: The Ignorant Fairies; 2007: The Caiman/Saturn in Opposition; 2008: Days and Clouds; 2015: My Mother; Best Supporting Actress; 2002: The Best Day of My Life; 2004: Caterina in the Big City

Margherita Buy (Italian pronunciation: [marɡeˈriːta ˈbui]; born 15 January 1962) is an Italian actress. She is a seven-time David di Donatello Awards winner and eight-time Nastro d'Argento winner.

== Career ==
Buy was born and raised in Rome. After a long period of studying at the Academy of Dramatic Arts, Buy had her acting breakthrough with Duccio Tessari's Una grande storia d'amore (1986), which was followed by roles in Daniele Luchetti's two projects It's Happening Tomorrow (1988) and The Week of the Sphinx (1990). For the latter, she won the best performance by an actress in a leading role award at the San Sebastian International Film Festival.

In 1990 she also appeared in Sergio Rubini's The Station, for which she won her first David di Donatello Prize and the Silver Ribbon as best leading actress, in 1990. After The Station, she became a premier star featuring in Italian box office hits like Carlo Verdone's Damned the day I met you (1992). She teamed up again with director Daniele Luchetti for The Storm Is Coming (1992) and worked with Mario Monicelli in Looking for Paradise (1995) and An Eyewitness Account (1997).

In 1994 she was directed by her husband, Sergio Rubini, in the film Prestazione straordinaria. She also formed a partnership with Italian director Giuseppe Piccioni, who directed her in four films, including Penniless Hearts (1996) and Not of this World (1999), which earned Buy her second David di Donatello Award.

Her role in Ferzan Özpetek's The Ignorant Fairies, in which she portrayed a widow who discovered her husband had been having an affair with a man for the last seven years, won her a Silver Ribbon for best lead. Cristina Comencini's The Best Day of My Life won her another Silver Ribbon, for best supporting actress. Paolo Virzì's Caterina in the Big City won her third David di Donatello and her third Silver Ribbon award as best supporting actress. For her work in Giovanni Veronesi's Manuale d'amore she won her fourth David di Donatello.

Buy's performance in I giorni dell'abbandono by Roberto Faenza earned her the Golden Graal for best performance by an actress in a drama. Il caimano by Nanni Moretti, which was shown at the 2006 Cannes film festival, earned her the Ciak d'oro award for best lead actress.

In October 2006, she starred in La sconosciuta, directed by Academy Award winner Giuseppe Tornatore, and in December she starred in Alessandro D'Alatri's Commediasexy.

== Personal life ==
Buy was born in a family with French and Tuscan origins. Her 1991 marriage with actor and film director Sergio Rubini ended by the mid-1990s. Her daughter Caterina De Angelis is also an actress.

== Filmography ==
=== Films ===
Year	Title	Role	Notes
1986	La seconda notte	Lea	
1988	It's Happening Tomorrow	Vera	
1988	I giorni randagi	Annalisa	
1989	Nulla ci può fermare	Francesca	
1990	The Station	Flavia	
1990	The Week of the Sphinx	Gloria	
1991	Ask for the Moon	Elena Bacchelli	
1992	Damned the Day I Met You	Camilla Landolfi	
1992	The Storm Is Coming	Eugenia Fontana	
1993	Condannato a nozze	Sandra	
1993	Cominciò tutto per caso	Stefania	
1994	Prestazione straordinaria	Clara Guerri	
1994	The Favourite Son	Annamaria	
1995	Facciamo paradiso	Claudia Bertelli	
1996	Bits and Pieces	Traffic warden	Cameo appearance
1996	Penniless Hearts	Lucia	
1996	Follow Your Heart	Young Olga	
1996	An Eyewitness Account	Franca Nava	
1997	Lady and the Tramp	Lady (voice)	1997 italian re-dubbing
1998	Dolce far niente	Gabriella	
1999	Not of this World	Sister Caterina	
2000	Tutto l'amore che c'è	Marisa De Vito	
2000	L'ombra del gigante	Adele	
2000	Against the Wind	Clara	
2001	The Ignorant Fairies	Antonia	
2002	The Best Day of My Life	Sara Mazzoni	
2003	It Can't Be All Our Fault	Flavia	
2003	Caterina in the Big City	Agata Iacovoni	
2004	Love Returns	Silvia	
2004	The Vanity Serum	Lucia Allasco	
2005	Manual of Love	Barbara	
2005	The Days of Abandonment	Olga	
2006	The Caiman	Paola Bonomo	
2006	The Unknown Woman	Irena's lawyer	
2006	Commediasexi	Dora Di Virgilio	
2007	Saturn in Opposition	Angelica	
2007	Days and Clouds	Elsa	
2009	The Ladies Get Their Say	Gabriella	
2009	The White Space	Maria	
2009	The Cézanne Affair	Adult Anna	
2010	Parents and Children: Shake Well Before Using	Rossana	
2010	Happy Family	Anna	
2010	Marriage and Other Disasters	Giovanna "Nanà"	
2011	Habemus Papam	Brezzi's wife	
2012	Love Is in the Air	Luigia	
2012	Magnificent Presence	Lea Marni	
2012	The Red and the Blue	Principal Ferrario	
2013	Discovery at Dawn	Caterina Astengo	
2013	A Five Star Life	Irene	
2013	Mi rifaccio vivo	Virginia	
2014	People Who Are Well	Carla Durloni	
2015	Mia Madre	Margherita	
2015	Burning Love	Movie actress	Cameo appearance
2015	Me, Myself and Her	Federica Salvini	
2016	Best Enemies Forever	Lucia	
2016	Questi giorni	Adria	
2016	La vita possibile	Anna	
2016	How to Grow Up Despite Your Parents	Silvia Rufini	
2017	Piccoli crimini coniugali	Elia's wife	
2018	Just Believe	Adriana Alberti	
2018	The King's Musketeers	Anne of Austria	
2020	Tutti per 1, 1 per tutti	Anne of Austria	
2021	Three Floors	Dora Simoncini	
2021	Il silenzio grande	Rose	
2021	7 Women and a Murder	Margherita Caccia	
2022	Exterior Night	Eleonora Chiavarelli	
2023	The First Day of My Life	Arianna	
2023	A Brighter Tomorrow	Paola	
2023	Volare	Anna Bettini	Also director
2024	Romeo Is Juliet	Clara	
2025	Twin Stars	Rossana	

=== Television ===
Year	Title	Role	Notes
1988	Una grande storia d'amore	Paola	Television film
1999	La vita che verrà	Viviana Vitanza	4 episodes
2004	Maigret	Louise Maigret	Television film
2008	Amiche mie	Anna Soavi	12 episodes
2009	Pinocchio	Teacher Laura	Television film
2017	In Treatment	Rita	35 episodes
2019	Made in Italy	Rita Pasini	8 episodes
2024	Ripley	Signora Buffi	4 episodes

== Awards and nominations ==
Award	Year	Category	Nomited work	Result	Ref.
Bari International Film Festival	2010	Best Actress	The White Space	Won	
Ciak d'oro	1988	Best Supporting Actress	It's Happening Tomorrow	Nominated	
Ciak d'oro	1991	Best Actress	The Station	Won	
Ciak d'oro	1992	Best Actress	Damned the Day I Met You	Won	
Ciak d'oro	1993	Best Actress	Cominciò tutto per caso	Nominated	
Ciak d'oro	2002	Best Actress	The Best Day of My Life	Won	
Ciak d'oro	2004	Best Supporting Actress	Caterina in the Big City	Won	
Ciak d'oro	2006	Best Actress	The Caiman	Won	
Ciak d'oro	2007	Best Actress	Saturn in Opposition	Won	
Ciak d'oro	2007	Super Ciak d'Oro	—	Won	
Ciak d'oro	2008	Best Actress	Days and Clouds	Won	
Ciak d'oro	2010	Super Ciak d'Oro	—	Won	
Ciak d'oro	2013	Best Actress	A Five Star Life	Won	
Ciak d'oro	2015	Best Actress	Mia Madre	Won	
David di Donatello	1991	Best Actress	The Station	Won	
David di Donatello	1991	Best Actress	The Week of the Sphinx	Nominated	
David di Donatello	1992	Best Actress	Damned the Day I Met You	Nominated	
David di Donatello	1993	Best Actress	Cominciò tutto per caso	Nominated	
David di Donatello	1997	Best Actress	An Eyewitness Account	Nominated	
David di Donatello	1999	Best Actress	Not of this World	Won	
David di Donatello	2001	Best Actress	The Ignorant Fairies	Nominated	
David di Donatello	2004	Best Supporting Actress	Caterina in the Big City	Won	
David di Donatello	2005	Best Supporting Actress	Manual of Love	Won	
David di Donatello	2006	Best Actress	The Caiman	Nominated	
David di Donatello	2007	Best Actress	Saturn in Opposition	Nominated	
David di Donatello	2008	Best Actress	Days and Clouds	Won	
David di Donatello	2010	Best Actress	The White Space	Nominated	
David di Donatello	2012	Best Supporting Actress	We Have a Pope	Nominated	
David di Donatello	2013	Best Actress	A Five Star Life	Won	
David di Donatello	2015	Best Actress	Mia Madre	Won	
David di Donatello	2023	Best Actress	Exterior Night	Nominated	
European Film Awards	2001	Best Actress	The Ignorant Fairies	Nominated	
European Film Awards	2015	Best Actress	Mia Madre	Nominated	
Flaiano Prizes	1992	Best Actress	Damned the Day I Met You	Won	
Globo d'oro	1987	Best Breakthrough Performance	La seconda notte	Won	
Globo d'oro	1992	Best Actress	The Station	Won	
Globo d'oro	2001	Best Actress	The Ignorant Fairies	Won	
Globo d'oro	2006	Best Actress	The Days of Abandonment	Nominated	
Globo d'oro	2006	Critic's Special Award	The Days of Abandonment	Won	
Globo d'oro	2007	Best Actress	Saturn in Opposition	Won	
Globo d'oro	2013	Best Actress	Discovery at Dawn	Nominated	
Globo d'oro	2015	Best Actress	Mia Madre	Nominated	
Golden Graal	2006	Best Comedy Actress	Manual of Love	Nominated	
Golden Graal	2006	Best Drama Actress	The Days of Abandonment	Won	
Golden Graal	2007	Best Comedy Actress	Commediasexi	Won	
Moscow International Film Festival	2008	Best Actress	Days and Clouds	Won	
Nastro d'Argento	1991	Best Actress	The Station	Won	
Nastro d'Argento	2000	Best Actress	Not of this World	Nominated	
Nastro d'Argento	2001	Best Actress	The Ignorant Fairies	Won	
Nastro d'Argento	2002	Best Supporting Actress	The Best Day of My Life	Won	
Nastro d'Argento	2004	Best Supporting Actress	Caterina in the Big City	Won	
Nastro d'Argento	2005	Best Actress	The Vanity Serum	Nominated	
Nastro d'Argento	2006	Best Actress	The Days of Abandonment	Nominated	
Nastro d'Argento	2007	Best Actress	The Caiman	Won	
Nastro d'Argento	2008	Best Actress	Days and Clouds	Won	
Nastro d'Argento	2009	Best Ensemble	The Ladies Get Their Say	Nominated	
Nastro d'Argento	2010	Best Actress	The White Space	Nominated	
Nastro d'Argento	2013	Best Actress	A Five Star Life	Nominated	
Nastro d'Argento	2015	Best Actress	Mia Madre	Won	
Nastro d'Argento	2017	Best Supporting Actress	Questi giorni	Nominated	
Nastro d'Argento	2019	Best Comedy Actress	The King's Musketeers	Nominated	
Nastro d'Argento	2023	Best Actress	Exterior Night	Won	
San Sebastián International Film Festival	1990	Best Actress	The Week of the Sphinx	Won	
Venice Film Festival	2009	Best Actress	The White Space	Won	
