= Ennio Fantastichini =

Italian actor (1955–2018)

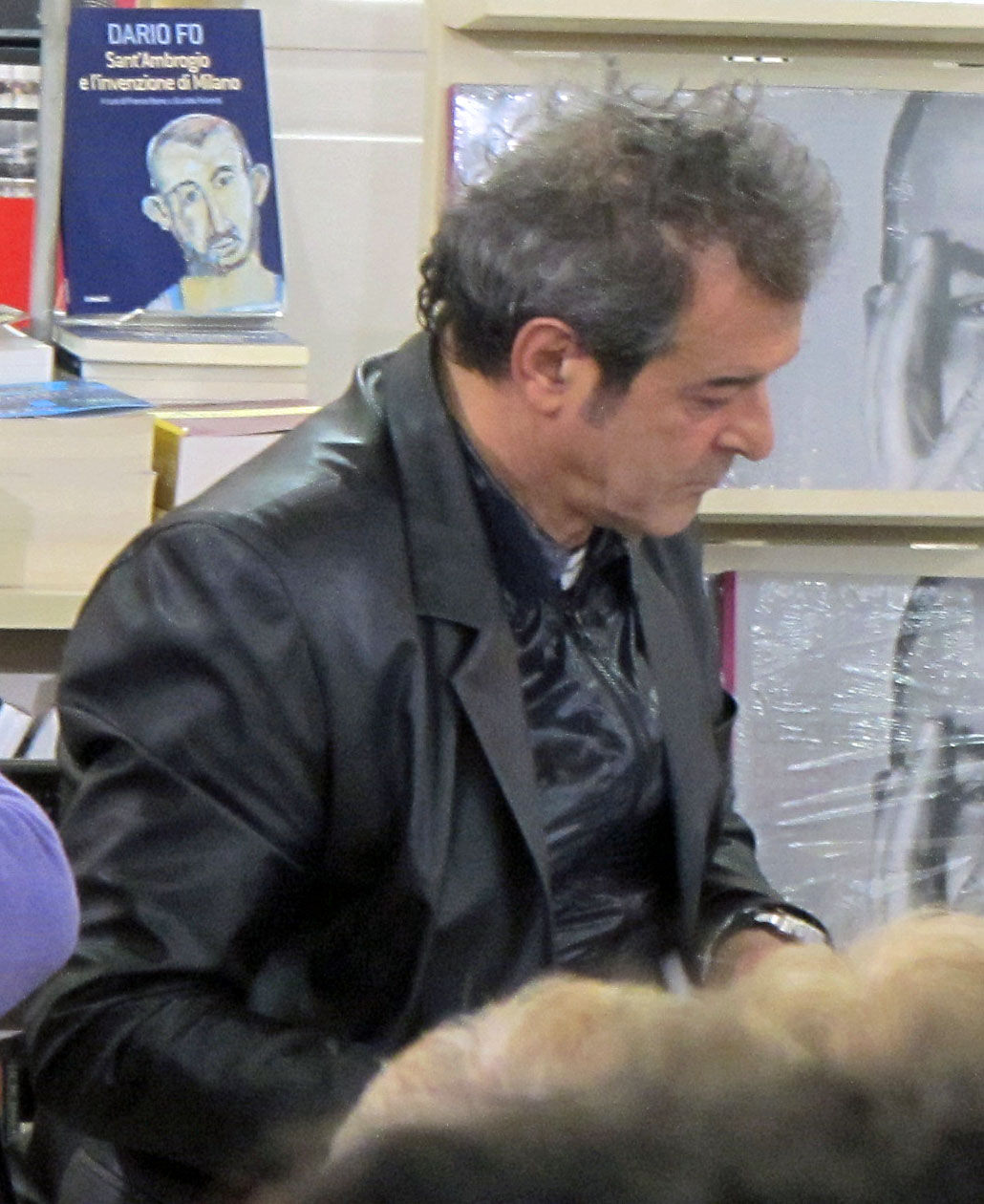
- Fantastichini in 2010
- Born: 20 February 1955; Gallese, Italy
- Died: 1 December 2018 (aged 63); Naples, Italy
- Occupation: Actor

Ennio Fantastichini (20 February 1955 – 1 December 2018) was an Italian actor.

== Life and career ==
Born in Gallese, province of Viterbo, Fantastichini studied acting at the Accademia Nazionale di Arte Drammatica Silvio D'Amico. His breakout role was Tommaso Scalia in Gianni Amelio's 1990 movie Open Doors, a role that gave him a Nastro d'Argento, a Ciak d'oro and a special European Film Award as European Discovery of the Year. In 2010, for his performance in Ferzan Özpetek's Loose Cannons, he won a David di Donatello for best supporting actor and a second Nastro d'Argento in the same category.

Fantastichini died of acute promyelocytic leukemia in Naples on 1 December 2018, at the age of 63.

== Selected filmography ==
- 1983: Fuori dal giorno
- 1984: Il ragazzo di Ebalus - Terrorist
- 1985: Big Deal After 20 Years - Domenico
- 1988: The Camels - Pino
- 1989: Via Panisperna Boys - Enrico Fermi
- 1990: Open Doors - Tommaso Scalia
- 1990: A Violent Life - Cosimo De Medici
- 1990: The Station - Danilo
- 1991: The Professional Secrets of Dr. Apfelgluck - Alain
- 1991: A Simple Story - Police Chief
- 1991: 18 anni tra una settimana - Nicola
- 1991: Mezzaestate
- 1992: Caldo soffocante - Giuliano Ferrini
- 1992: Gangsters - Giulio
- 1993: The Blonde - Alberto
- 1994: The True Life of Antonio H.
- 1995: Vendetta - Don Tommaso
- 1996: August Vacation - Ruggero Mazzalupi
- 1997: Arlette - Angelo Mascarpone
- 1997: Other Men - Loris Corbi
- 1997: Commercial Break - Giulio Stucchi
- 1998: Viol@ - Mittler (voice)
- 1998: Vite in sospeso - Dario
- 1998: Per tutto il tempo che ci resta - Judge Giorgio Nappi
- 1999: Il corpo dell'anima - Mauro
- 1999: Senza movente - Toni Aragona
- 2000: Against the Wind - Leo
- 2000: Joseph of Nazareth (TV Movie) - Herodes
- 2000: Paul the Apostle - (TV Movie) - Peter
- 2001: Come si fa un Martini - Paolo
- 2002: Sei come sei - Nico ("Appuntamento al buio")
- 2002: Rosa Funzeca - Capitone
- 2002: Napoléon (TV Mini-Series) - Joseph Bonaparte
- 2003: At the End of the Night - Bruno
- 2005: Karol: A Man Who Became Pope (TV Movie) - Maciej Nowak
- 2007: Saturn in Opposition - Sergio
- 2007: Night Bus - Carlo Matera
- 2007: Prova a volare - Pietro
- 2007: Peopling the Palaces at Venaria Reale - Marchese di Caraglio
- 2008: Two Fists, One Heart - Joe Argo
- 2009: Fort Apache Napoli - Sindaco Cassano
- 2009: The Red Shadows - Varga
- 2009: I, Don Giovanni - Antonio Salieri
- 2009: Purple Sea - Salvatore
- 2009: La cosa giusta - Duccio Monti
- 2009: Il mostro di Firenze (TV Mini-Series) - Renzo Rontini
- 2010: Loose Cannons - Vincenzo Cantone
- 2011: All at Sea - Il suicida
- 2011: The Arrival of Wang - Curti
- 2012: Cherry on the Cake - M. Faysal
- 2012: Il pasticciere - Avvocato
- 2012: Breve storia di lunghi tradimenti - Gianfilippo Brandi
- 2013: Studio illegale - Giuseppe Sobreroni
- 2013: The Move of The Penguin - Ottavio
- 2014: Do You Remember Me? - Amedeo
- 2014: Do You See Me? - Dr. Ripamonti
- 2015: Me, Myself and Her - Sergio
- 2016: La stoffa dei sogni - De Caro
- 2016: Caffè - Enrico
- 2017: Una famiglia - Giorgio
- 2017: The Music of Silence - zio Giovanni
- 2018: Fabrizio De André - Principe libero - Giuseppe De André
- 2019: Citizens of the World - Attilio (Posthumous release and final film role)
