= Arnaldo Ninchi =

Italian actor, voice actor, and basketball player

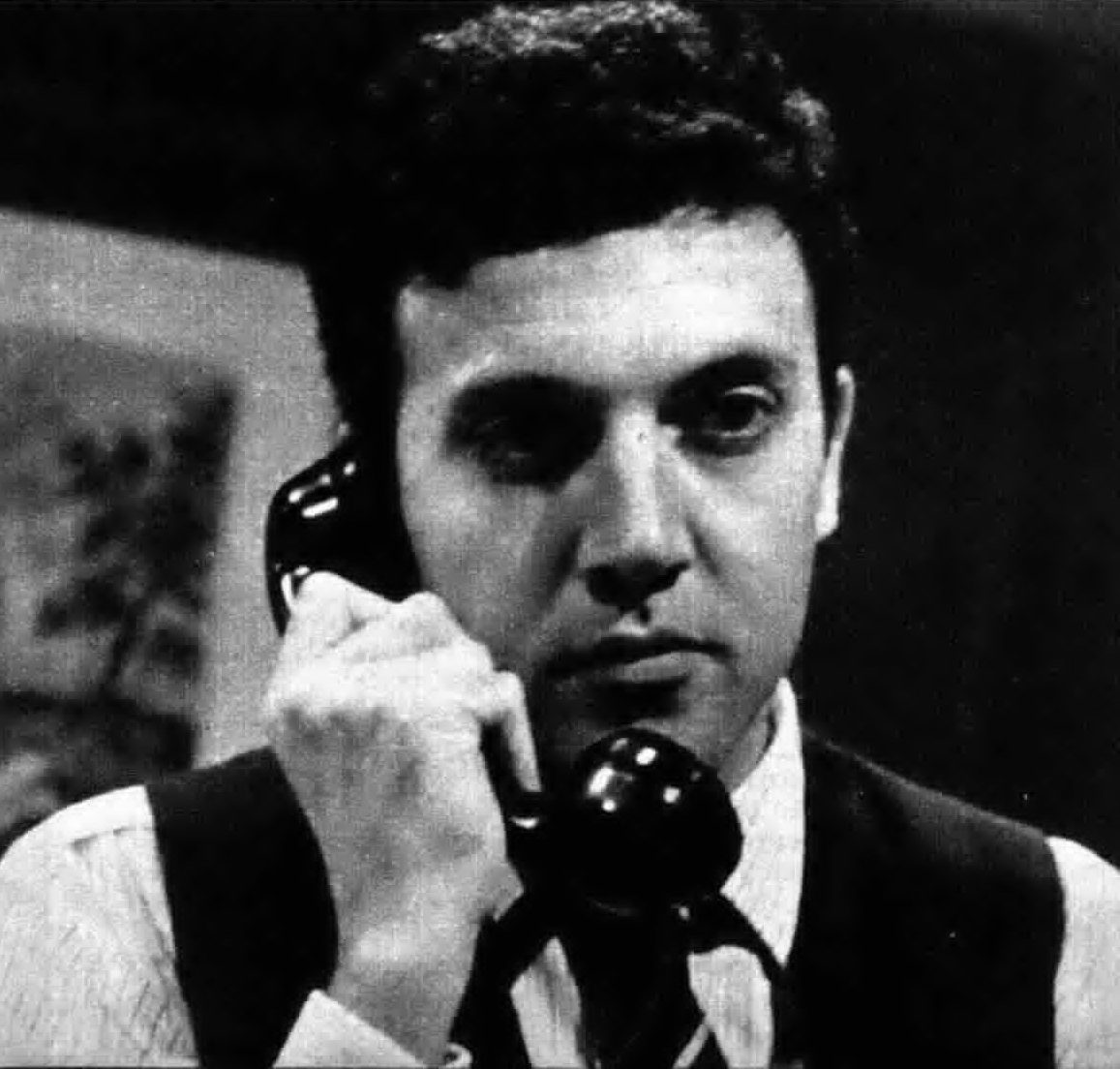
- Born: 17 December 1935; Pesaro, Italy
- Died: 6 May 2013 (aged 77); Rome, Italy
- Occupation: Actor

Arnaldo Ninchi (17 December 1935 – 6 May 2013) was an Italian actor, voice actor and basketball player.

Ninchi was born in Pesaro, the son of the actor Annibale. In his youth he was a basketball player, debuting on the national team at just 17 years old. In 1959 he graduated from the Silvio D'Amico National Academy of Dramatic Art and began working on stage. He later founded his own stage company. He was also active in television and film. His films include works directed by Claude Chabrol, Giuliano Montaldo, Lina Wertmüller, Pupi Avati, Silvio Soldini. He was cousin of the actress Ave Ninchi.
