= Giuseppe Piccioni =

Italian film director

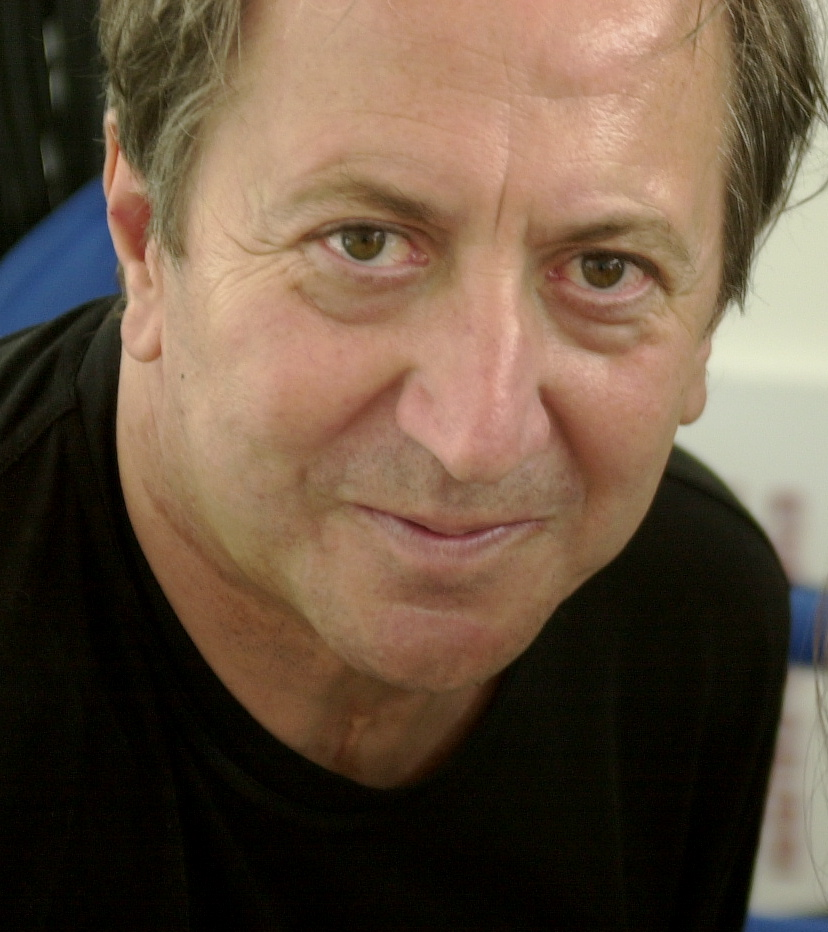
- Born: 2 July 1953 (age 72); Ascoli Piceno, Italy
- Occupations: Film director, screenwriter
- Years active: 1987-present

Giuseppe Piccioni (born 2 July 1953) is an Italian film director and screenwriter. He has directed nine films since 1987. His 2004 film The Life That I Want was entered into the 27th Moscow International Film Festival.

== Selected filmography ==
- Ask for the Moon - 1990
- Diary of a Man Condemned to Marriage - 1993
- Penniless Hearts - 1996
- Not of this World (Fuori dal mundo) - 1999
- Light of My Eyes - 2001
- The Life That I Want - 2004
- Giulia Doesn't Date at Night - 2009)
- The Red and the Blue - 2012
- Questi giorni - 2016
- L'ombra del giorno - 2016
- The Shadow of the Day - 2022
