= 51st David di Donatello =

2006 Italian film awards

- Date: 21 April 2006
- Hosted by: Veronica Pivetti

Highlights
- Best Picture: The Caiman
- Most awards: Romanzo Criminale (8)
- Most nominations: The Caiman and Romanzo Criminale (13)

Television coverage
- Network: RaiSat CinemaWorld

The 51st David di Donatello ceremony, presented by the Accademia del Cinema Italiano, was held on 21 April 2006.

== Winners and nominees ==
Best Film: The Caiman, directed by Nanni Moretti; My Best Enemy, directed by Carlo Verdone; Notte prima degli esami, directed by Fausto Brizzi; Romanzo Criminale, directed by Michele Placido; Our Land, directed by Sergio Rubini	Best Producer: Angelo Barbagallo, Nanni Moretti for Sacher Film – The Caiman; Domenico Procacci, Nicola Giuliano, Francesca Cima – Mario's War; Aurelio De Laurentiis – My Best Enemy; Fulvio Lucisano and Federica Lucisano for IFF, Gianandrea Pecorelli for Aurora Film e TV – Notte prima degli esami; Riccardo Tozzi, Giovanni Stabilini, Marco Chimenz – Romanzo Criminale
Best Director: Nanni Moretti – The Caiman; Antonio Capuano – Mario's War; Michele Placido – Romanzo Criminale; Sergio Rubini – Our Land; Carlo Verdone – My Best Enemy	Best New Director: Fausto Brizzi – Notte prima degli esami; Vittorio Moroni – You Must Be the Wolf; Francesco Munzi – Saimir; Fausto Paravidino – Texas; Stefano Pasetto – Tartarughe sul dorso
Best Actor: Silvio Orlando – The Caiman; Antonio Albanese – The Second Wedding Night; Fabrizio Bentivoglio – Our Land; Kim Rossi Stuart – Romanzo Criminale; Carlo Verdone – My Best Enemy	Best Actress: Valeria Golino – Mario's War; Margherita Buy – The Caiman; Cristiana Capotondi – Notte prima degli esami; Giovanna Mezzogiorno – Don't Tell; Ana Caterina Morariu – My Best Enemy
Best Supporting Actor: Pierfrancesco Favino – Romanzo Criminale; Giorgio Faletti – Notte prima degli esami; Neri Marcorè – The Second Wedding Night; Nanni Moretti – The Caiman; Sergio Rubini – Our Land	Best Supporting Actress: Angela Finocchiaro – Don't Tell; Isabella Ferrari – The Goodbye Kiss; Marisa Merlini – The Second Wedding Night; Stefania Rocca – Don't Tell; Jasmine Trinca – The Caiman
David di Donatello for Best Screenplay: Stefano Rulli, Sandro Petraglia, Giancarlo De Cataldo, Michele Placido – Romanzo Criminale; Nanni Moretti, Francesco Piccolo, Federica Pontremoli – The Caiman; Silvio Muccino, Pasquale Plastino, Silvia Ranfagni, Carlo Verdone – My Best Enemy; Fausto Brizzi, Massimiliano Bruno, Marco Martani – Notte prima degli esami; Angelo Pasquini, Carla Cavalluzzi, Sergio Rubini – Our Land	Best Cinematography: Luca Bigazzi – Romanzo Criminale; Arnaldo Catinari – The Caiman; Fabio Cianchetti – Our Land; Danilo Desideri – My Best Enemy; Marcello Montarsi – Notte prima degli esami
Best Production Design: Paola Comencini – Romanzo Criminale; Giancarlo Basili – The Caiman; Andrea Crisanti – The Goodbye Kiss; Carlo De Marino – Fire at My Heart; Maurizio Marchitelli – My Best Enemy	Best Score: Franco Piersanti – The Caiman; Goran Bregović – The Days of Abandonment; Paolo Buonvino – Romanzo Criminale; Negramaro, Fabio Barovero, Simone Fabroni, Roy Paci, Louis Siciliano – The Fever; Bruno Zambrini – Notte prima degli esami
Best Song: Insieme a te non ci sto più from The Goodbye Kiss – Paolo Conte, Michele Virano, Vito Pallavicini, Caterina Caselli; Forever Blues from Forever Blues – Lino Patruno; The Days of Abandonment from The Days of Abandonment – Goran Bregović; Solo per te from The Fever – Giuliano Sangiorgi; You Can Never Hold Back Spring from The Tiger and the Snow – Tom Waits, Kathleen Brennan	Best Editing: Esmeralda Calabria – Romanzo Criminale; Osvaldo Bargero – The Fever; Claudio Di Mauro – My Best Enemy; Luciana Pandolfelli – Notte prima degli esami; Cecilia Zanuso – Don't Tell
Best Sound: Alessandro Zanon – The Caiman; Benito Alchimede, Maurizio Grassi – Notte prima degli esami; Gaetano Carito – My Best Enemy; Mario Iaquone – Romanzo Criminale; Bruno Pupparo – Don't Tell	Best Costumes: Nicoletta Taranta – Romanzo Criminale; Francesco Crivellini – The Second Wedding Night; Annalisa Giacci – Fire at My Heart; Tatiana Romanoff – My Best Enemy; Lina Nerli Taviani – The Caiman
Best Special Visual Effects: Proxima – Romanzo Criminale; Francesco Sabelli for RSG Effetti speciali – Don't Tell; E.D.I. – The Fever; Guido Pappadà – Fire at My Heart; Simone Silvestri – Floor 17; UBIK – The Tiger and the Snow	Best Documentary Feature: The Wise Cat Catches Mice, directed by Francesco Conversano and Nene Grignaffini; In un altro paese, directed by Marco Turco; L'isola di Calvino, directed by Roberto Giannarelli; Piccolo Sole – Vita e morte di Henri Crolla, directed by Nino Bizzarri; Primavera in Kurdistan, directed by Stefano Savona; Volevo solo vivere, directed by Mimmo Calopresti
Best Short Film: Un inguaribile amore, directed by Giovanni Covini; Codice a sbarre, directed by Ivano De Matteo; Dentro Roma, directed by Francesco Costabile; Tanalibera tutti, directed by Vito Palmieri; Zakaria, directed by Gianluca & Massimiliano De Serio	Best European Film: Match Point, directed by Woody Allen; L'Enfant, directed by Dardenne brothers; Mrs. Henderson Presents, directed by Stephen Frears; March of the Penguins, directed by Luc Jacquet; Caché, directed by Michael Haneke
Best Foreign Film: Crash, directed by Paul Haggis; A History of Violence, directed by David Cronenberg; Good Night, and Good Luck., directed by George Clooney; Brokeback Mountain, directed by Ang Lee; Tsotsi, directed by Gavin Hood	David Youth Award: Romanzo Criminale, directed by Michele Placido; Don't Tell, directed by Cristina Comencini; Never Again as Before, directed by Giacomo Campiotti; My Best Enemy, directed by Carlo Verdone; Notte prima degli esami, directed by Fausto Brizzi
Torino Piemonte Film Commission Award: Mario's War, directed by Antonio Capuano; The Caiman, directed by Nanni Moretti; Once You're Born You Can No Longer Hide, directed by Marco Tullio Giordana; Saimir, directed by Francesco Munzi; Our Land, directed by Sergio Rubini	Special David Awards: Gina Lollobrigida; Piero Tosi; Giuseppe Rotunno; Ennio Morricone; Dino De Laurentiis; Francesco Rosi; Suso Cecchi D'Amico; Mario Garbuglia
