= Alessandro Sperduti =

Italian actor

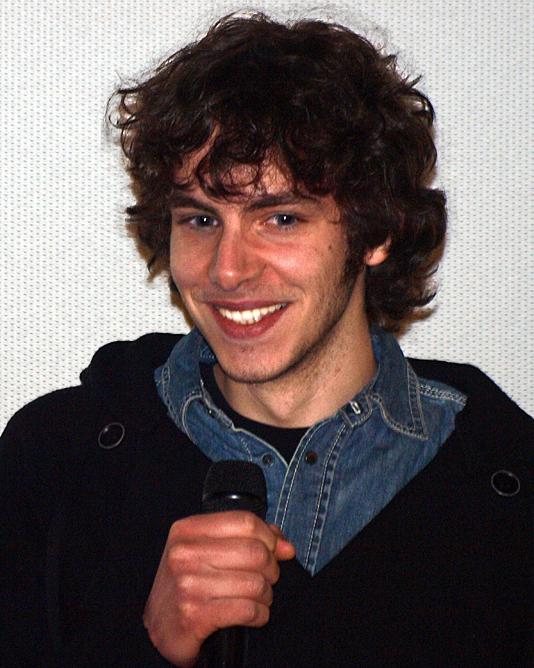
- Alessandro Sperduti in 2012
- Born: 8 July 1987 (age 39); Rome, Italy
- Occupation: Actor
- Years active: 1998–present

Alessandro Sperduti (born 8 July 1987) is an Italian actor who has appeared in multiple television and film productions since the age of 11. In 2016, he was noted for his performance as Piero de' Medici in the Rai television series Medici: Masters of Florence.

== Filmography ==
=== Films ===
| Year | Title | Role(s) | Notes |
|---|---|---|---|
| 2002 | Heaven | Ariel | |
| 2003 | I Am David | Carlo | |
| 2003 | Kiss Me First | Emanuele | |
| 2003 | The Order | Extra | Uncredited |
| 2007 | Red Zone | Alfredo | Short film |
| 2009 | Sbirri | Marco Gatti | |
| 2009 | Meno male che ci sei | Gabriele | |
| 2012 | Love Is in the Air | Simone | |
| 2014 | Greenery Will Bloom Again | The Lieutenant | |
| 2016 | One Kiss | Massimo | |
| 2017 | The Music of Silence | Adriano | |
| 2017 | Rainbow: A Private Affair | Sheriff | Cameo |
| 2017 | The Lego Batman Movie | Dick Grayson / Robin | Voice |
| 2018 | Paul, Apostle of Christ | Cassius | |
| 2019 | Mollami | Antonio | |
| 2021 | Three Floors | Andrea Bardi | |
| 2022 | I cassamortari | Matteo | |
| 2022 | Dante | Young Dante Alighieri | |
| 2027 | The Resurrection of the Christ: Part One | | Post-production |

=== Television ===
| Year | Title | Role(s) | Notes |
|---|---|---|---|
| 1999 | Cristallo di Rocca: Una storia di Natale | Young Corrado | Television film |
| 2000 | Vola sciusciù | Flavio | Television film |
| 2000–01 | Distretto di Polizia | Federico Scalise | Recurring role; 25 episodes |
| 2001 | Sarò il tuo giudice | Luca Corbara | Television film |
| 2004 | Noi | Luca Avogadro | Main role |
| 2005 | Orgoglio | Riccardo Aldovranti | Main role (season 3) |
| 2007 | Fuga con Marlene | Stefano | Television film |
| 2007 | Caterina e le sue figlie | Geremia | Main role (season 2) |
| 2008–09 | I liceali | Valerio Campitelli | Main role (season 1-2) |
| 2011 | R.I.S. Roma | Randone's grandson | Episode: "Via la maschera" |
| 2014 | Un matrimonio | Angelo Dagnini | 3 episodes |
| 2014 | A testa alta | Vittorio Marandola | Television film |
| 2015 | Caccia al Re – La narcotici | Zeno Ribosi | Main role (season 2) |
| 2016 | Medici | Piero de' Medici | Main role (season 1) |
| 2018–22 | Carlo & Malik | Marco Cantabella | Main role |
| 2021 | Leonardo | Tommaso Masini | Main role |
| 2025 | The Leopard | Colonel Bombello | 3 episodes |
