= Notte prima degli esami – Oggi =

2007 Italian comedy film

- Directed by: Fausto Brizzi
- Written by: Fausto Brizzi; Massimiliano Bruno; Marco Martani
- Produced by: Federica Lucisano; Fulvio Lucisano
- Starring: Giorgio Panariello; Nicolas Vaporidis; Carolina Crescentini
- Music by: Bruno Zambrini
- Distributed by: 01 Distribution
- Release date: 16 February 2007
- Running time: 102 minutes
- Country: Italy
- Language: Italian

Notte prima degli esami – Oggi (lit. 'The Night Before the Exams: Today') is a 2007 Italian comedy film directed by Fausto Brizzi.

The film is a sequel to 2006 Notte prima degli esami.

== Cast ==
- Nicolas Vaporidis as Luca Molinari
- Carolina Crescentini as Azzurra De Angelis
- Serena Autieri as Professor Elisabetta Paliani
- Giorgio Panariello as Paolo Molinari
- Chiara Mastalli as Simona Natali
- Sarah Maestri as Alice Corradi
- Andrea De Rosa as Massimiliano "Massi" Apolloni
- Paola Onofri as Antonella Molinari
- Eros Galbiati as Riccardo
- Franco Interlenghi as Grandpa Luigi
- Armando Pizzuti as Filippo Santilli
- Riccardo Rossi as the exam superintendent
- Clizia Fornasier as Giulia
- Roberto Ciufoli as the Police Commissioner
- Enzo Salvi as Inspector Vannucci
- Paola Minaccioni as football supporter
- Marco Liorni as himself
- Giorgio Faletti as Professor Martinelli

== English Dub ==
- Jim Cummings as Paolo Molinari
- Mikey Kelley as Luca Molinari
- Tara Strong as Azzurra De Angelis
- Jodi Benson as Professor Elisabetta Paliani
- Kate Micucci as Simona Natali
- Grey DeLisle as Alice Corradi
- Greg Cipes as Massimiliano "Massi" Apolloni
- Kath Soucie as Antonella Molinari
