= Mastalli =

Mastalli is an Italian surname. Notable people with the surname include:

- Alessandro Mastalli (born 1996), Italian footballer
- Chiara Mastalli (born 1984), Italian film and television actress
