= Benvenga =

Benvenga is an Italian surname. Notable people with the surname include:

- Alex Benvenga (born 1991), Italian footballer
- Carolina Benvenga (born 1990), Italian singer, actress, and television presenter
