= Nicolas Vaporidis =

Italian actor

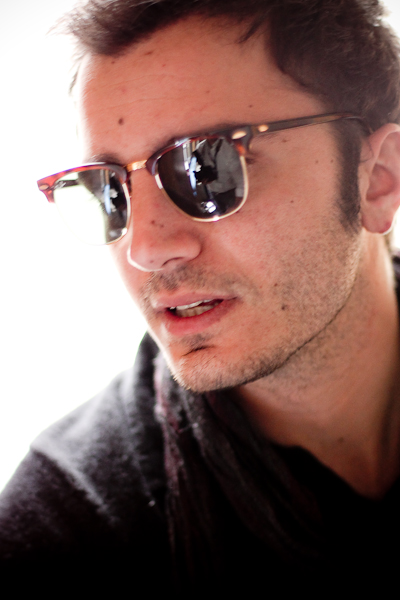
- Vaporidis in 2010
- Born: 22 December 1981 (age 44); Rome, Italy
- Years active: 2002–present

Nicolas Vaporidis (Greek: Νικόλας Βαπορίδης; born 22 December 1981) is an Italian actor.

== Biography ==
Vaporidis was born in Rome to an Italian mother and a Greek father. He obtained a classical diploma in Rome in 2000, then enrolled in a communication sciences program. He moved to London, where he remained more than a year working as a waiter and attending English classes. After London, Vaporidis returned to Italy and attended the acting school Teatro Azione, directed by Christian Del Bianco Cristiano Censi and Isabella Del Bianco.

In 2002, Vaporidis' first film role was in Il ronzio delle mosche directed by Dario D'Ambrosi and co-starring Greta Scacchi. The following year, Enrico Oldoini gave him the title role in 13dici a tavola.

In 2006, Vaporidis starred opposite Cristiana Capotondi in the film Notte prima degli esami directed by Fausto Brizzi.

Vaporidis' novel Bravissimo a sbagliare was published by Mondadori in 2007 (ISBN 8804568275).

== Personal life ==
On September 8, 2012, Vaporidis married Giorgia Surina in Mykonos, but they divorced in 2014.

== Filmography ==
=== Film ===
Year	Film	Role
2003	Il ronzio delle mosche	Dario Brunelli
2004	13dici a tavola	Giulio
2005	Ti amo in tutte le lingue del mondo	Figlio Psicologo
2006	Notte prima degli esami	Luca
2007	Notte prima degli esami – Oggi	Luca Molinari
2007	Last Minute Marocco	Andrea
2007	Concrete Romance	Diego Santini
2007	Come tu mi vuoi	Riccardo
2008	Questa notte è ancora nostra	Massimo
2009	Iago	Iago
2010	Tutto l'amore del mondo	Matteo Marini (also a producer)
2010	Men vs. Women	Andrea
2011	Women vs. Men	Andrea
2012	Ci vediamo a casa	
2013	Il Futuro	Libio (also an associate producer)
2013	Outing - Fidanzati per sbaglio	Federico Maretti
2013	13 at a Table	Giulio at 18
2017	All the Money in the World	Il Tamia "Chipmunk"
2019	L'agenzia dei bugiardi	Cameo appearance
in pre-production	Road to Capri	Luca

=== Television ===
Year	Series	Role	Notes
2003	Carabinieri	Damiano Lodati	"Un'impressione luminosa" (season 2, episode 11)
2004	Dago e Flash		
2004	Anna's World		television film
2006	Crime Evidence		"Testimone silenzioso" (season 2, episode 1)
2006	Orgoglio		Capitolo terzo
2012	6 passi nel giallo	Domenico de Chirico	"Souvenir" (season 1, episode 3)
