= Roberto Piazza =

Roberto Piazza may refer to:

- Roberto Piazza (designer) (born 1959), Argentine actor, singer, writer, and fashion designer of Italian descent
- Roberto Piazza (volleyball coach) (born 1968), Italian volleyball coach
- Roberto Piazza, birth name of Little Bob (born 1945), French rock musician
