= Maria Palma Petruolo =

Italian actress

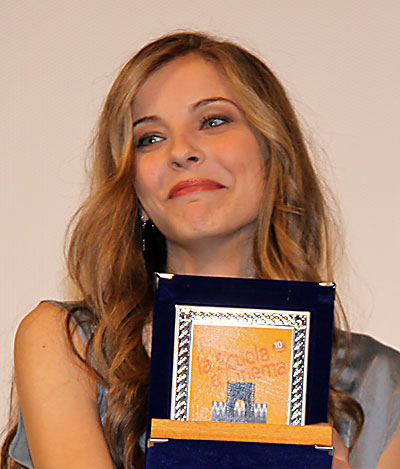
- Mary Petruolo in 2009 at the Spring Festival of Italian Cinema
- Born: 28 March 1989 (age 37); Marcianise, Italy
- Occupation: Actress
- Years active: 2002–present

Maria Palma Petruolo (born 28 March 1989) is an Italian actress.

== Early life and career ==
Originally from Marcianise, daughter of a Carabinieri marshal and an elementary school teacher, she made her debut in 2002 playing the role of the young Marie-José of Belgium in the television miniseries Maria José - L'ultima regina, directed by Carlo Lizzani and broadcast by Rai 1. The following year, like Mary Petruolo, she made her debut on the big screen with the film Uomini & donne, amori & bugie, screenplay and directed by Eleonora Giorgi, debuting as a director.

Between 2004 and 2006 she participated in various television productions, including the television series La squadra, broadcast on Rai 3, and Diritto di difesa, broadcast on Rai 2, and the Rai 1 series Gente di mare, directed by Vittorio De Sisti and Alfredo Peyretti, Orgoglio, in which she plays the role of Gabriella Obrofari, and Raccontami, directed by Tiziana Aristarco and Riccardo Donna, in the role, which gives her popularity, by Francesca Fortini.

In 2007 she was one of the protagonists of the miniseries Il segreto di Arianna, directed by Gianni Lepre, and Clare and Francis, directed by Fabrizio Costa, in which she plays the role of Santa Chiara. In the same year she participates in the Incontro nazionale dei giovani 2007. In 2008 she returns to the small screen with the second season of Raccontami and with the Italian-French-American co-production Coco Chanel.

In 2009 she appears again on the big screen as the protagonist, together with Emanuele Bosi, of the film Questo piccolo grande amore by Riccardo Donna; the film is inspired by Claudio Baglioni's 1972 concept album of the same name. In the same year she appears for the first time in a production of Canale 5, in the miniseries Doc West, directed by Giulio Base and Terence Hill, where she plays the role of Millie Mitchell.

In 2010 she is the protagonist, in the role of second lieutenant Costanza Moro, of the Canale 5 R.I.S. Roma – Delitti imperfetti, directed by Fabio Tagliavia and Cristian De Mattheis. In 2012 she appears again on the small screen, in the episode The trace of the snake of the television series Nero Wolfe. In 2014 she is again on Rai 1 in Madre, aiutami, a miniseries starring Virna Lisi, in which she plays the role of Sister Vera.

== Filmography ==
=== Film ===
- Uomini & donne, amori & bugie, directed by Eleonora Giorgi (2003)
- Il dono dei Magi, directed by Gianni Quaranta (2007)
- Questo piccolo grande amore, directed by Riccardo Donna (2009)

=== Television ===
- Maria José - L'ultima regina, directed by Carlo Lizzani - TV series (2002)
- Orgoglio, directed by Marco Tocchi - TV series (2004-2006)
- La squadra, directed by Claudio Norza - TV series (2004)
- Diritto di difesa, directed by Nino Formica - TV series (2004)
- A casa di Anna, directed by Enrico Oldoini - TV series (2004)
- Gente di mare - TV series (2005)
- Raccontami, directed by Tiziana Aristarco - TV series (2007-2008)
- Il segreto di Arianna, directed by Gianni Lepre - TV series (2007)
- Clare and Francis, directed by Fabrizio Costa - TV-movie (2007)
- Coco Chanel, directed by Christian Duguay - TV series (2008)
- Doc West, directed by Giulio Base and Terence Hill - TV series (2009)
- Doc West - la sfida, directed by Giulio Base and Terence Hill - TV series (2009)
- R.I.S. Roma – Delitti imperfetti, directed by Fabio Tagliavia - TV series (2010)
- Nero Wolfe - TV series (2012)
- Madre, aiutami, directed by Gianni Lepre - TV series (2014)
- Una pallottola nel cuore, directed by Luca Manfredi - TV series (2014)
- Meraviglie - La penisola dei tesori, directed by Alberto Angela - TV series (2018)
