= Katia Ricciarelli =

Italian soprano

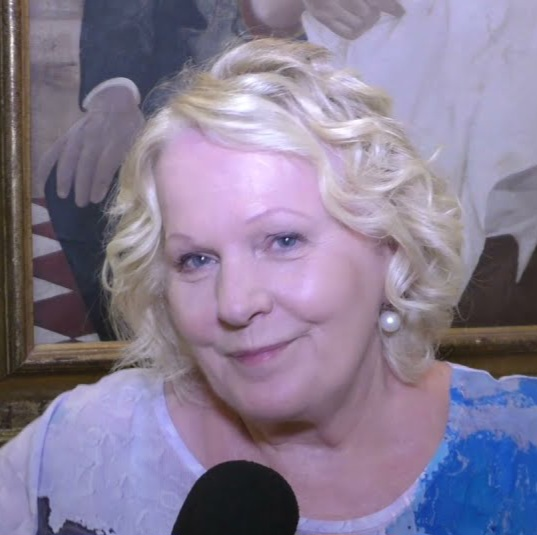
- Ricciarelli in 2021
- Born: Katiuscia Maria Stella Ricciarelli; 16 January 1946 (age 80); Rovigo, Kingdom of Italy
- Occupations: Operatic soprano; actress
- Years active: 1969–present
- Spouse: Pippo Baudo (m. 1986; div. 2007)

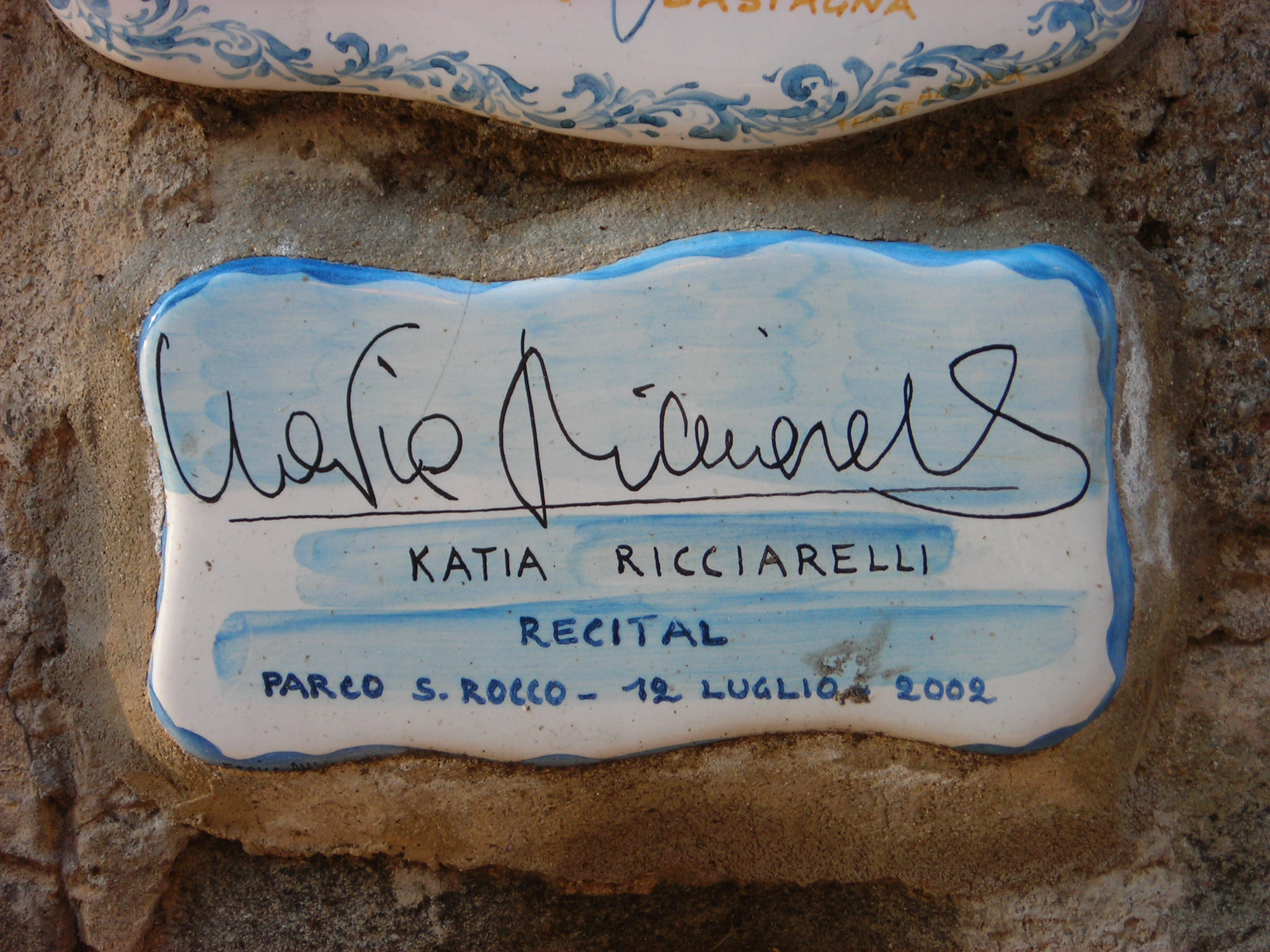
Katia Ricciarelli's signature on the Muretto in Alassio

Katiuscia Maria Stella "Katia" Ricciarelli (Italian pronunciation: [ˈkaːtja rittʃaˈrɛlli]; born 16 January 1946) is an Italian soprano and actress.

== Early life and career ==
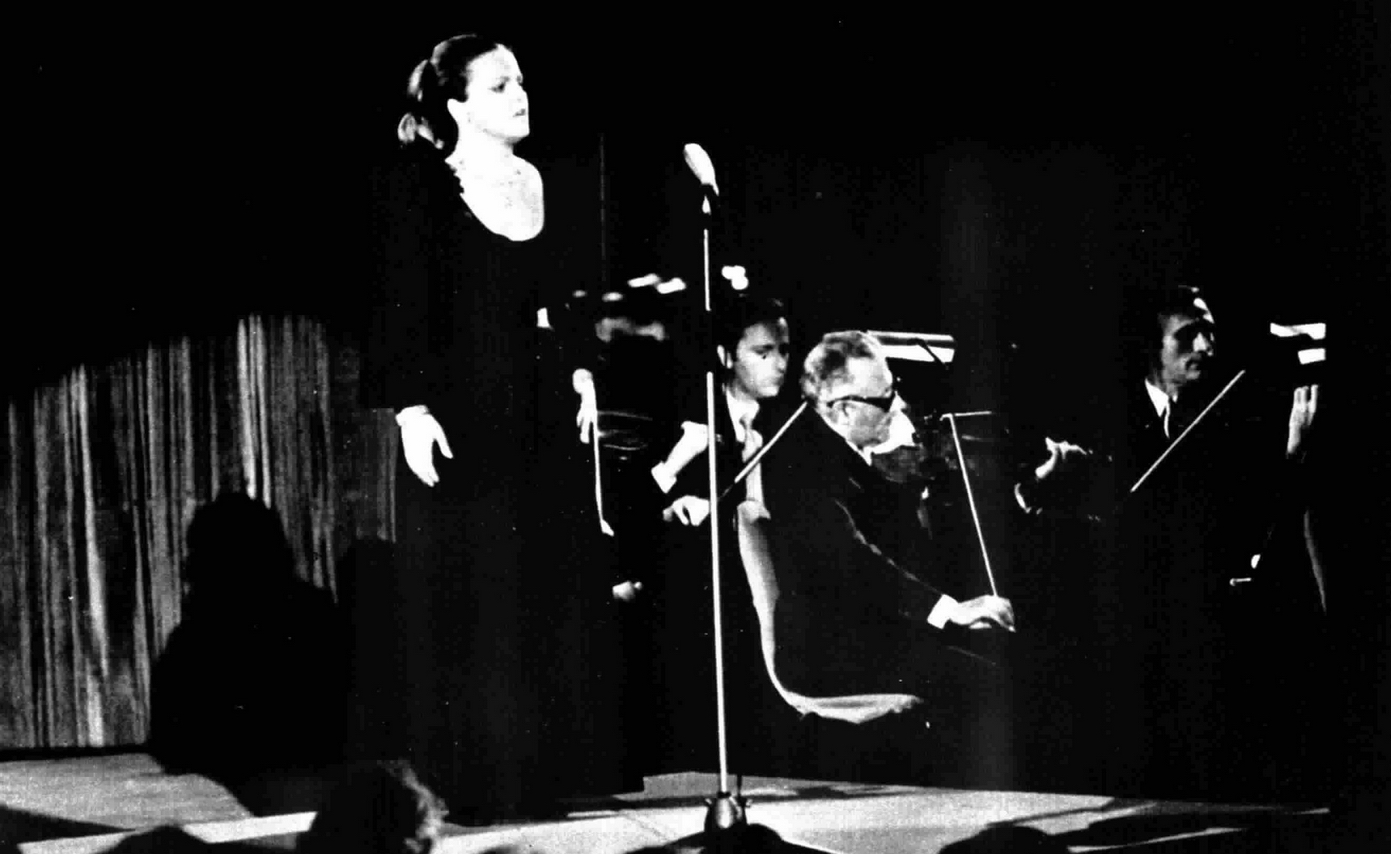
Ricciarelli performing in 1973

Born in Rovigo, Veneto, to a very poor family, Ricciarelli struggled during her younger years. She studied at the Benedetto Marcello Conservatory in Venice, won several vocal competitions in 1968, and made her professional debut as Mimì in Puccini's La bohème in Mantua in 1969. She appeared as Leonora in Verdi's Il trovatore in Parma in 1970. In the following year, she won RAI's Voci Verdiane award. Between 1972 and 1975, engagements followed in the major European and American opera houses, including Lyric Opera of Chicago (1972), La Scala in Milan (1973), Royal Opera House in London (1974), and the Metropolitan Opera in New York City in 1975. In 1981, she began a decade-long association with the Rossini Opera Festival in Pesaro, thus broadening her repertoire of Rossini's operas.

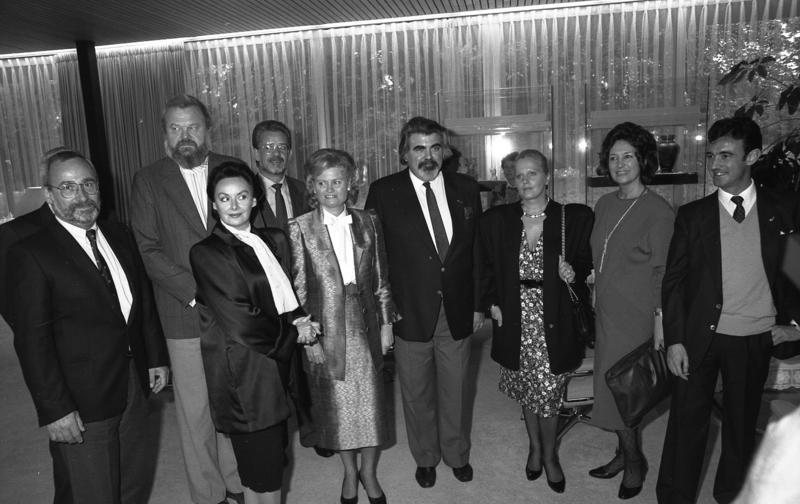
Ricciarelli (third from right) at a charity concert in Bonn Opera, 1987

Beside her many opera performances, Ricciarelli also appeared as Desdemona in Franco Zeffirelli's film version of Verdi's Otello in 1986, alongside Plácido Domingo. In 1991, she founded the Accademia Lirica di Katia Ricciarelli, and, between 2003 and 2005, she was artistic director of the annual summer Macerata Opera festival. In 2005, she won the best actress prize Nastro d'Argento, awarded by the Italian film journalists, for her role in Pupi Avati's La seconda notte di nozze.

In 2006, Ricciarelli participated in the reality show La fattoria (Italian version of The Farm) on Canale 5. In 2021–2022, she participated in the reality show Grande Fratello VIP 6 (Big Brother VIP 6), getting evicted after 165 days.

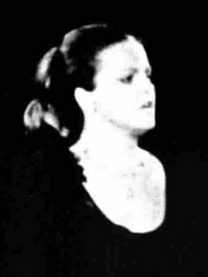
Photo of Katia Ricciarelli.

== Personal life ==
In 1986, on her 40th birthday, Ricciarelli married Pippo Baudo, a television personality; she filed for divorce upon their separation in the summer of 2004, with the divorce being finalized in 2007.

She turned 80 years old on 16 January 2026. She resides in Bardolino, by lake Garda, Italy.

== Discography ==
- Puccini: Suor Angelica (Bruno Bartoletti, 1973) (RCA)
- Verdi: Simon Boccanegra (Gianandrea Gavazzeni, 1973) (RCA)
- Verdi: Un ballo in maschera (Claudio Abbado, 1975) (Kultur DVD)
- Verdi: I due Foscari (Lamberto Gardelli, 1976) (Philips)
- Verdi: La battaglia di Legnano (Lamberto Gardelli, 1977) (Philips)
- Puccini: La bohème (Colin Davis, 1979) (Philips/Decca)
- Puccini: Tosca (Herbert von Karajan, 1979) (Deutsche Grammophon)
- Verdi: Luisa Miller (Lorin Maazel, 1979) (Deutsche Grammophon)
- Verdi: Un ballo in maschera (Abbado, 1980) (Deutsche Grammophon)
- Verdi: Il trovatore (Davis, 1980) (Philips)
- Verdi: Aida (Abbado, 1981) (Deutsche Grammophon)
- Puccini: Turandot (as Turandot, Karajan, 1981) (Deutsche Grammophon); (as Liù, Maazel, 1983) (CBS/Sony)
- Bizet: Carmen (Karajan, 1982) (Deutsche Grammophon)
- Verdi: Falstaff (Carlo Maria Giulini, 1982) (Deutsche Grammophon)
- Rossini: La donna del lago (Maurizio Pollini, 1983) (CBS/Sony)
- Verdi: Don Carlos (Abbado, 1982) (Deutsche Grammophon)
- Donizetti: L'elisir d'amore (Claudio Scimone, 1984) (Philips)
- Verdi: Otello (Maazel, 1986) (EMI)
- Rossini: La gazza ladra (Gelmetti, 1990) (Sony)
- Bellini: Mass No. 2 in G minor and Giuseppe Geremia's Missa Pro Defunctis 1809 (Douglas Bostock, 1997) (Classico)
- Verdi: Un ballo in maschera (Giuseppe Patanè, directed by Elijah Moshinsky, 16 February 1980, Metropolitan Opera) (Paramount Home Video)
- Various: The Metropolitan Opera Centennial Gala (22 October 1983) (Deutsche Grammophon DVD 00440-073-4538, 2009)

== Filmography ==
=== Films ===
Year	Title	Role	Notes
1975	Un ballo in maschera	Amelia	Lead actress
1986	Otello	Desdemona	Lead actress
2005	The Second Wedding Night	Liliana Vespero	Lead actress
2008	Black and White	Olga	Supporting actress
2009	The Friends at the Margherita Cafe	Taddeo's mother	Supporting actress
2013	The Chair of Happiness	Norma Pecche	Supporting actress
2016	Infernet	Sara	Supporting actress
2022	Mancino naturale	Maria	Supporting actress

=== Television ===
Year	Title	Role	Notes
1982	Lucia di Lammermoor	Lucia	Television film
1984	Turandot	Liù	Television film
1998	Canzoni sotto l'albero	Herself/ Performer	Special
2001	Gian Burrasca	Mother Stoppani	Television film
2004	Don Matteo	Giulia Baldeschi	Episode: "Dietro il sipario"
2006	La Fattoria	Herself/ Contestant	Reality show (season 3) - Evicted Day 81
2006	Ma chi l'avrebbe mai detto	Camilla	Miniseries
2008	Carabinieri	Monica Grandi	Main role (season 7); 22 episodes
2009	Il ritmo della vita	Secretary	Television film
2009	Così fan tutte	Katia	Sketch comedy show
2010	Io canto	Herself/ Judge	Talent show (season 1)
2010	Let's dance	Herself/ Contestant	Talent show
2011–2015	Un passo dal cielo	Assunta Scotton	Main role (seasons 1–3); 39 episodes
2012	Faccia d'angelo	Toso's mother	Television film
2013–2014	Un matrimonio	Aunt Amabile	Main role; 6 episodes
2016	Selfie - Le cose cambiano	Herself/ Mentor	Reality show (season 1)
2020	Come una madre	Elisa	Episode: "Episode 3"
2021–2022	Grande Fratello VIP	Herself/ Contestant	Reality show (season 6) - Evicted Day 165
