= Zero in condotta =

- Directed by: Giuliano Carnimeo
- Written by: Giorgio Mariuzzo
- Starring: Angelo Maggi; Elena Sofia Ricci; Antonella Lualdi
- Cinematography: Federico Zanni
- Music by: Roberto Pregadio
- Release date: 1983
- Language: Italian

Zero in condotta ("Zero for Conduct") is a 1983 Italian teen comedy film directed by Giuliano Carnimeo and starring Angelo Maggi and Elena Sofia Ricci.

== Plot ==
Among the students of the last year of a classical high school, there is Renato, a young student, who has always been in love and not reciprocated by his classmate Manuela. Together with the two inseparable friends, taking advantage of the absence of his parents, he organizes a party in his house with Manuela and two other classmates. Suspended from school for breaking into the women's locker room, Renato decides to leave Sweden thinking of finding easy sexual adventures. On the train, he meets a lady on his way to Florence, who confesses to him that she is looking for adventures with young boys to take revenge on her husband, who has cheated on her with an eighteen year old. As she greets him, the lady gives him a note with her telephone number and invites him to visit her. The boy returns to Rome and, after discovering that the lady on the train is married to the mathematics teacher, he decides to go back to court with Manuela.

== Cast ==
- Angelo Maggi as Renato Petrocelli aka Speedy Gonzales
- Elena Sofia Ricci as Manuela
- Orsetta Gregoretti as Cristina Cavatocci aka Chiappa Tosta
- Tiziana Altieri as Maria Grazia Turri aka Diomela
- Sebastiano Somma as Giuseppe La Magna aka Cassiodoro
- Giacomo Rosselli as Gino Mezzalega
- Giorgio Vignali as Riccardo Zanetti aka Dumbo
- Ornella Pacelli as Angela Gaspari aka Acquasantiera
- Antonella Lualdi as Milena
- Annabella Schiavone as Renato's Mother
- Gianfranco Barra as Professor Giandomenico Gelmetti aka Palle Secche
- Luca Sportelli as The Head Teacher aka Culandrone
- Sophia Lombardo as Teacher
- Ennio Antonelli as Varechina

== See also ==
- List of Italian films of 1983
