= Giada Di Miceli =

Italian television host television and radio personality

- Occupations: Television presenter, radio personality
- Years active: 2001 - present
- Website: www.GiadaDiMiceli.it

Giada Di Miceli (born 18 January 1987 in Rome) is an Italian television presenter and radio personality.

== Biography ==
Graduated in philosophy; from 2011 led the program Non succederà più on Radio Manà Manà.

Since 2014, she moved on Radio Radio Station (FM 104.5)

== Television ==
- (2005) - Vivo di moda giovane, Sky Vivo
- (2007) - Buona Domenica, Canale 5
- (2008) - La Talpa, Italia 1
- (2013) - Speciale Sanremo 2013, Sky Uno

== Radio ==
- (2011–present) Non succederà più, Radio Manà Manà since 2014 this radio show moved on Radio Radio

=== Theater ===
- (2001) - Bentornato signor Bertolt Brecht
- (2003) - Bertoldo a Corte”, directed by Gianfraco Mazzoni
- (2006) - l’Amore è eterno e la pazzia lo accompagna, directed by Gianfranco Mazzoni.

=== Film ===
==== Movies ====
- (2005) - Ad occhi aperti, directed by Marco Bergami
- (2005) - 13dici a tavola, directed by Enrico Oldoini

==== Television ====
- (2004) - Carabinieri tre, fiction TV, Canale 5.

== See also ==
- Radio Manà Manà
