= 13 at a Table =

2004 film

- Directed by: Enrico Oldoini
- Written by: Enrico Oldoini
- Starring: Giancarlo Giannini; Nicolas Vaporidis; Kasia Smutniak
- Cinematography: Sandro Grossi
- Edited by: Raimondo Crociani
- Music by: Stefano Acqua
- Distributed by: Warner Bros. Pictures Italia
- Release date: 2004
- Country: Italy
- Language: Italian

13 at a Table (Italian: 13dici a tavola, also known as Tredici a tavola) is a 2004 Italian comedy film written and directed by Enrico Oldoini.

It was entered into the main competition at the 2005 Tokyo International Film Festival.

== Cast ==
- Giancarlo Giannini as Giulio
- Nicolas Vaporidis as Giulio at 18
- Kasia Smutniak as Anna
- Manuela Borlotti as Arianna
- Silvia De Santis as Daria
- Paolo Bonacelli as Grandpa Giulio
- Gianna Giachetti as Grandma Ester
- Luca Angeletti as Roberto
- Angela Finocchiaro as Piera
- Maria Amelia Monti as Matilde
- Alessandro Benvenuti as Antonio
- Niccolò Enriquez as Pietro
- Andrea Giuliano as Furio
- Pietro Fornaciari as Moreno
- Giada Di Miceli as Silvia
- Carlo Monni as Paolino

== See also ==
- List of Italian films of 2004
