= Angelo Maggi =

Italian actor and voice actor (born 1955)

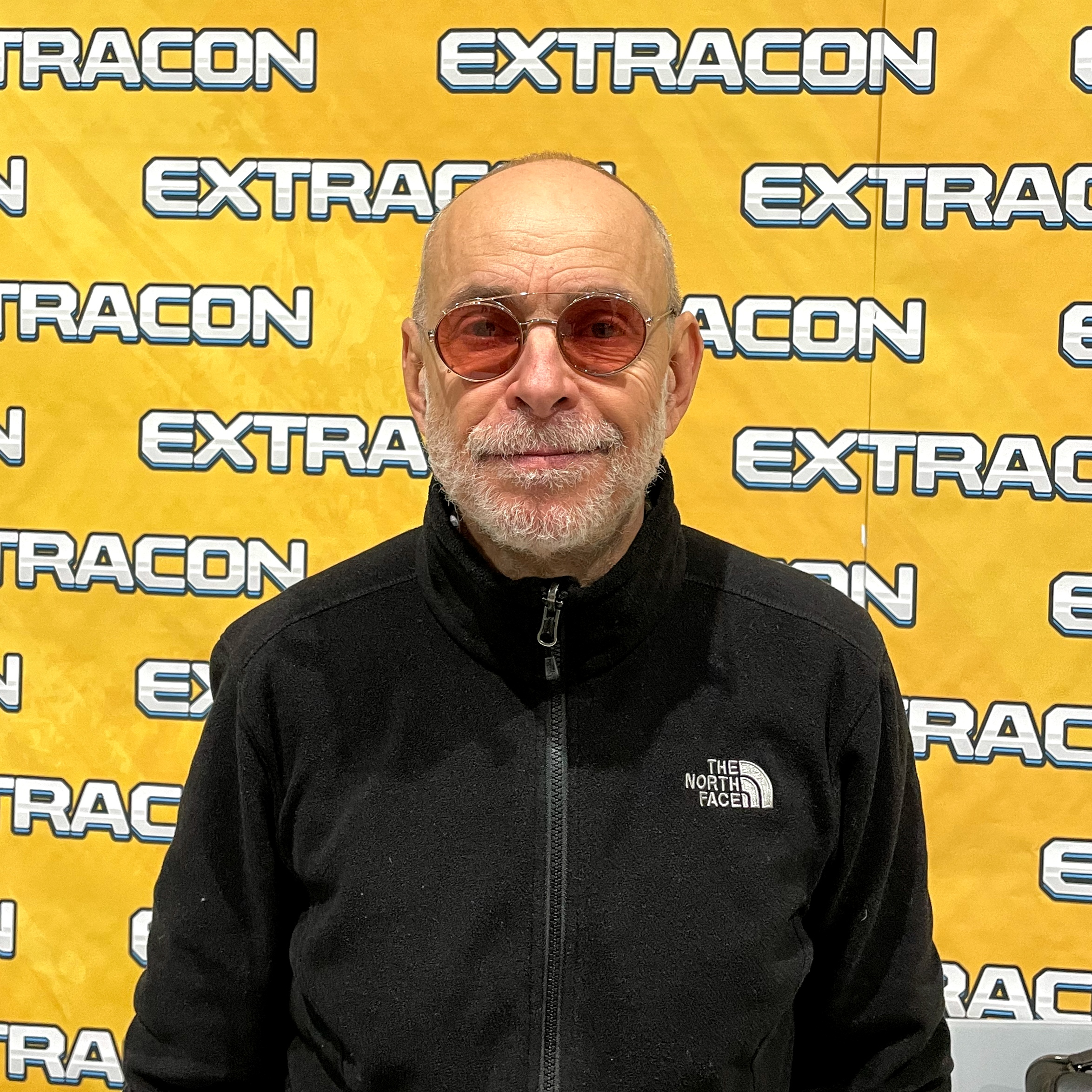
- Maggi in 2024
- Born: Angelo Maggi Mariotti; 16 December 1955 (age 70); Rome, Italy
- Occupations: Actor; voice actor; dubbing director
- Years active: 1982–present

Angelo Maggi Mariotti (born 16 December 1955) is an Italian actor and voice actor.

== Biography ==
Born in Rome, Maggi rose to fame in the 1980s as an actor. During that time, he made at least six film appearances and was quite popular on stage early in his career. He is more successful as a voice dubber, as he is the official Italian dubbing voice of Tom Hanks, Bruce Willis and Jackie Chan. Other actors he dubs includes Steve Guttenberg, Gary Oldman, Danny Huston, John Turturro and Robert Downey Jr.

Maggi's character dubbing roles include Perry Cox (portrayed by John C. McGinley) in Scrubs, Leroy Jethro Gibbs (portrayed by Mark Harmon) in NCIS and Tony Stark (portrayed by Robert Downey Jr.) in the Marvel Cinematic Universe. In his animated roles, Maggi has been the current Italian voice of Chief Wiggum in The Simpsons since the fifth season. He even provided the Italian voice of Sheriff Woody in the animated film Toy Story 4 following the death of Woody's longtime Italian dubber Fabrizio Frizzi the previous year.

== Filmography ==
=== Cinema ===
- Di padre in figlio (1982)
- Sapore di mare (1983)
- Zero for Conduct (1983) - Renato Petrocelli / Speedy Gonzales
- Dagger Eyes (1983)
- Time for Loving 2 - One Year Later (1983) - Marchesino Pucci
- Vacanze in America (1984)
- Mi faccia causa (1984)
- Il coraggio di parlare (1987) - Gino, the pusher
- Stradivari (1988) - Opera Singer
- Ascolta la canzone del vento (2003) - Dad

=== Television ===
- Time for Loving (1982)
- L'amore non basta (2005) - Guido
- Paul VI: The Pope in the Tempest (2008) - Eugenio Pacelli
- Il delitto di via Poma (2011) - Recchia

== Dubbing roles ==
=== Animation ===
- Shotaro Kaneda in Akira
- Superman in Superman: The Animated Series
- Michael Stone in Anomalisa
- Sheriff Woody in Toy Story 4
- Rei's Grandpa in Sailor Moon (Viz Media redub)
- Chief Wiggum (season 5 and on) and Reverend Lovejoy (episode 5.5) in The Simpsons
- Abraham Van Helsing in Hotel Transylvania 3: Summer Vacation
- Monkey in Kung Fu Panda, Kung Fu Panda 2, Kung Fu Panda 3, Kung Fu Panda: Legends of Awesomeness

=== Live action ===
- Tony Stark / Iron Man in Iron Man, Iron Man 2, Iron Man 3, The Incredible Hulk, The Avengers, Avengers: Age of Ultron, Captain America: Civil War, Spider-Man: Homecoming, Avengers: Infinity War, Avengers: Endgame, Spider-Man: Far From Home, Black Widow
- Yang Naing Lee in Rush Hour, Rush Hour 2, Rush Hour 3
- Seymour Simmons in Transformers, Transformers: Revenge of the Fallen, Transformers: Dark of the Moon, Transformers: The Last Knight
- James Gordon in The Dark Knight, The Dark Knight Rises
- William Thacker in Notting Hill
- David in Love Actually
- Raymond Reddington in The Blacklist
- Roger Callaway in It Takes Two
- Tim Carson in Casper: A Spirited Beginning
- Jack Frye in The Aviator
- Isaac French/Dr. Miles Phoenix in The Number 23
- William Stryker in X-Men Origins: Wolverine
- King Richard the Lionheart in Robin Hood
- Leroy Jethro Gibbs in NCIS
- Malcolm Crowe in The Sixth Sense
- Christopher Marlowe in Shakespeare in Love
- Oberon in A Midsummer Night's Dream
- David Dunn in Unbreakable
- Larry Mazilli in Clockers
- Pete Hogwallop in O Brother, Where Art Thou?
- Dr. Andrew Brown in Everwood
- Chuck Noland in Cast Away
- Carl Hanratty in Catch Me If You Can
- Viktor Navorski in The Terminal
- James B. Donovan in Bridge of Spies
- Perry Cox in Scrubs
- Robby Ray Stewart in Hannah Montana
