= Primo Reggiani =

Italian actor

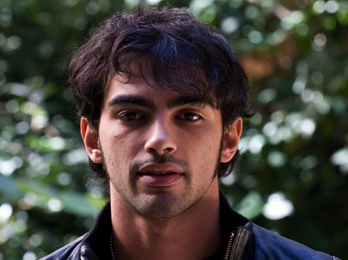
- Reggiani in 2008
- Born: 5 November 1983 (age 42); Rome, Italy
- Occupation: Actor
- Years active: 1996–present

Primo Reggiani (born 5 November 1983) is an Italian actor. Born in Rome to Tuscan actor Aldo Reggiani and Apulian actress Caterina Costantini, he appeared in more than thirty films since 1996.

== Selected filmography ==
=== Film ===
Year	Title	Role	Director
1998	Kaputt Mundi		Marco Risi
2003	Life as It Comes	Beppe's son	Stefano Incerti
2005	Melissa P.	Daniele	Luca Guadagnino
2009	The Sicilian Girl	Lorenzo	Marco Amenta
2009	The Trick in the Sheet	Federico	Alfonso Arau
2010	Baciami ancora	Lorenzo	Gabriele Muccino

=== Television ===
Year	Title	Role	Notes
1996	Uno di noi		Rai 1 TV series
1996	Turbo		Rai 2 TV series
2000	Una donna per amico	Leo	Rai 1 TV series
2001	Don Matteo		Rai 1 TV series
2003	Elisa di Rivombrosa		Canale 5 TV series
2004–2005	Orgoglio	Antonio Pironi	Rai 1 TV series
2005	Grandi domani	Simone Astarita	Italia 1 TV series
2006–2008	Raccontami	Antonio Dentici	Rai 1 TV series
2010–2012	R.I.S. Roma – Delitti imperfetti	Emiliano Cecchi	Canale 5 TV series
2012–2015	Una grande famiglia	Stefano Rengoni	Rai 1 TV series
