= Fabrizio Frizzi =

Italian television presenter (1958–2018)

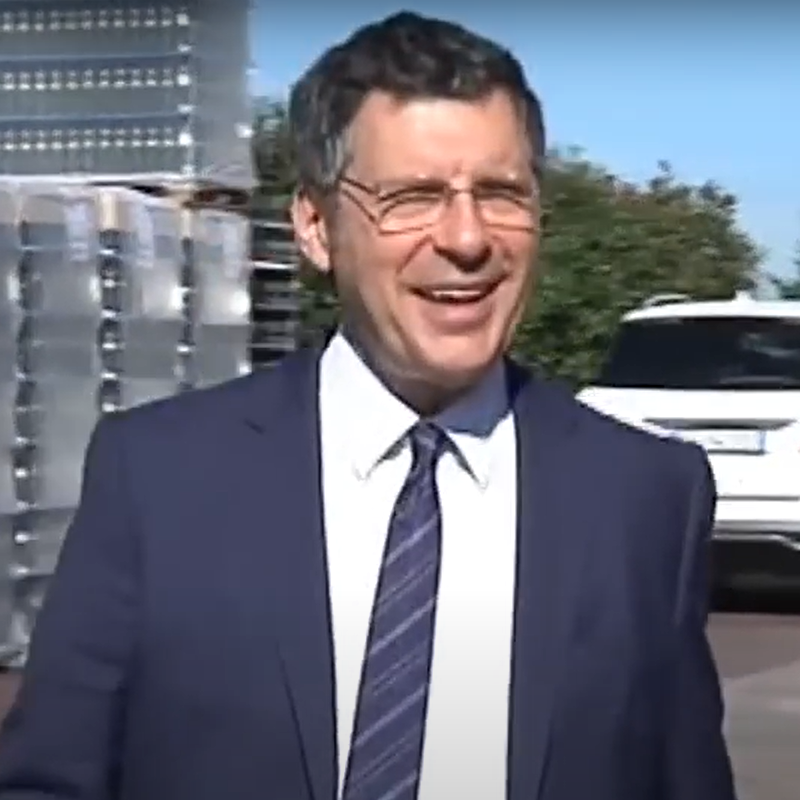
- Frizzi in 2016
- Born: 5 February 1958; Rome, Italy
- Died: 26 March 2018 (aged 60); Rome, Italy
- Occupations: Television presenter; radio presenter; voice actor
- Years active: 1980–2018
- Spouses: Rita Dalla Chiesa (m. 1992; div. 2002) Carlotta Mantovan (m. 2014)
- Children: 1
- Relatives: Fabio Frizzi (brother)

Fabrizio Frizzi (Italian pronunciation: [faˈbrittsjo ˈfrittsi]; 5 February 1958 – 26 March 2018) was an Italian television presenter and voice actor. He often presented a mixture of variety shows, talent shows and game shows across Italy and he was also known as the Italian voice of Woody from the Toy Story franchise since first until third movie, then Angelo Maggi tooks the role starting from the forth movie.

== Early life and career ==
Born in Rome to parents from Bologna, Frizzi began his career in 1980, successfully auditioning to host the children's show Il barattolo for Rai 2 in 1980. He continued in the young people's afternoon slot, firstly with Tandem and later with Pane e marmellata, which he co-hosted with his first wife Rita Dalla Chiesa.

Starting from the early nineties, Frizzi presented several prime-time RAI TV shows, including I fatti vostri, Scommettiamo che...? (the Italian version of Wetten, dass..?), Europa, Europa (with Elisabetta Gardini), the popular Sunday afternoon magazine show Domenica in and several editions of Miss Italia. He also became presenter of the annual celebrity football match Partita del cuore, which raised funds for charity and scientific research, and hosted various editions of the Italian Telethon. In 1995 he won the 'Oscar della TV' award for his presentation of the quiz show Luna Park. In 1997 he began co-hosting the prime-time show Per tutta la vita...? (Italian version of the French Pour la vie) together with former model Natasha Stefanenko, for two of the show's six seasons, and with Romina Power for another three seasons.

After a brief spell with Mediaset channel Canale 5, Frizzi returned to the state broadcaster in 2003 as presenter of the weekday morning show Piazza Grande, a format Frizzi had been familiar with as host of its nineties' predecessor I Fatti Vostri. In 2005 he starred in the first series of Ballando con le stelle, the Italian version of Strictly Come Dancing, coming fourth overall. As his popularity increased he also returned to Telethon and Partita del cuore, charity TV and sports events which he had championed in the 1990s. In the summer of 2007 he launched the new early evening game show I soliti ignoti – identità nascoste, based on the US game show Identity. The show was a big success for RAI and Frizzi went on to host it until 2012, when the show was suspended (it was successfully revived in 2017).

In April 2014, Frizzi became the third host of the Italian game show L'eredità, replacing Carlo Conti. The pair then shared the hosting of the show until October 2016, when Frizzi became its only presenter. In 2015 he was appointed Commendatore della Repubblica by President of the Italian Republic, Giorgio Napolitano.

=== Other ventures ===
Frizzi received international attention for dubbing the voice of Sheriff Woody (originally voiced by Tom Hanks), one of the main characters in Pixar's Toy Story film series into Italian, as well a car version of Woody in Cars. He also reprised the role of Woody in television shorts, video games and more. Frizzi also made a guest appearance in the Italian dubbed version of The Simpsons on the episode Pay Pal in which he voiced John Wilkes Booth.

From 1999 to 2001, Frizzi had an acting role as Paolo Bonelli in the RAI television drama series Non lasciamoci più. The show only lasted two seasons.

=== Personal life ===
Previously married to fellow television presenter Rita dalla Chiesa, ten years his senior, in 2014 Frizzi married his second wife, the nearly 24 years younger TV presenter Carlotta Mantovan, whom he had met during the 2001 auditions for Miss Italia. The couple had a daughter, Stella, born in 2013.

Frizzi was also the younger brother of composer Fabio Frizzi.

== Illness and death ==
On 23 October 2017, while recording an episode of L'eredità, Frizzi suffered an ischemic stroke, which led him to take a break from work.

He returned to the show to great acclaim in December of the same year. In the early hours of 26 March 2018, he suffered a cerebral haemorrhage that proved to be fatal. He was rushed to the Sant'Andrea Hospital but it was too late to save him and he died. He was 60 years old. His funeral, attended by thousands, was held two days later at the Basilica di Santa Maria in Montesanto located in the Piazza del Popolo in Rome, commonly known as the Chiesa degli artisti, the "Church of the Artists".

The Italian voice of Woody was passed on to voice actor and Frizzi's friend Angelo Maggi in Toy Story 4. The Italian dubbed version of the movie is dedicated to Frizzi.

== Voice work ==
=== Dubbing ===
==== Films (Animation, Italian dub) ====
Year	Title	Role(s)	Ref
1995	Toy Story	Sheriff Woody	
1999	Toy Story 2	Sheriff Woody	
2000	Buzz Lightyear of Star Command: The Adventure Begins	Sheriff Woody	
2006	Cars	Woody Wagon	
2010	Toy Story 3	Sheriff Woody	
2011	Hawaiian Vacation	Sheriff Woody	
2011	Small Fry	Sheriff Woody	
2012	Partysaurus Rex	Sheriff Woody	

==== Television (Animation, Italian dub) ====
Year	Title	Role(s)	Notes	Ref
2013	Toy Story of Terror!	Sheriff Woody	TV special	
2014	Toy Story That Time Forgot	Sheriff Woody	TV special	
2014	The Simpsons	Booth Wilkes John	1 episode (season 25, episode 21)	

==== Video games (Italian dub) ====
Year	Title	Role(s)	Ref
1999	Toy Story 2: Buzz Lightyear to the Rescue	Sheriff Woody	
2009	Toy Story Mania!	Sheriff Woody	
2010	Toy Story 3	Sheriff Woody	
2013	Disney Infinity	Sheriff Woody	

== Filmography ==
- Non lasciamoci più (1999–2001) – Paolo Bonelli
- Buona giornata (2012) – Himself
