= Concrete Romance =

- Directed by: Marco Martani
- Written by: Marco Martani
- Starring: Nicolas Vaporidis; Giorgio Faletti; Carolina Crescentini
- Cinematography: Marcello Montarsi
- Music by: Paolo Buonvino
- Release date: 5 October 2007
- Running time: 95 minutes
- Country: Italy
- Language: Italian

Concrete Romance (Italian: Cemento armato, literally "Reinforced Concrete") is a 2007 Italian neo-noir film directed by Marco Martani.

== Plot ==
The young restless Diego Santini accidentally collides with a mobster boxwood, called "Primary". The gangster wants at all costs to avenge the offense of Diego: he tries to kill Dieg's best friend, then shoots his mother, and finally humiliates Diego by making him believe police the culprit. Diego, trying to kill his enemy, he discovers that the primary years earlier killed his father, humiliating him in front of everyone, making him believe a "failed". So Diego, furious, following the primary to a bridge and jumps. Both fall into the void.

== Cast ==
- Nicolas Vaporidis: Diego Santini
- Giorgio Faletti: Il Primario
- Carolina Crescentini: Asia
- Dario Cassini: Silvio Cola
- Ninetto Davoli: Pompo
- Matteo Urzia: Samuele
