= Amiche mie =

- Also known as: My Friends
- Genre: Comedy
- Created by: Paolo Genovese; Luca Miniero
- Starring: Margherita Buy; Luisa Ranieri; Cecilia Dazzi; Guido Caprino; Stefano Pesce; Gaia Bermani Amaral; Pino Quartullo; Elena Sofia Ricci
- Country of origin: Italy
- No. of seasons: 1
- No. of episodes: 12

Original release
- Network: Canale 5
- Release: November 5 – December 7, 2008

Amiche mie (English: My Friends) is a 2008 Italian comedy television series, originally broadcast on Canale 5. The series follows Anna (Margherita Buy) who becomes dissatisfied with her family life and writes to famous gynecologist and sexologist Giorgio Monesi (Guido Caprino), known as "Dr. G", for advice.

== Cast ==
- Margherita Buy: Anna
- Elena Sofia Ricci: Francesca
- Luisa Ranieri: Marta
- Cecilia Dazzi: Grazia
- Guido Caprino: Giorgio
- Elena Russo: Vanessa
- Katie McGovern: Fortune teller
- Stefano Pesce: Federico
- Gaia Bermani Amaral: Lulu
- Pino Quartullo: Vasco
- Franco Neri: Lino
- Barbara Bouchet: Mariella
- Lillo Petrolo: Filippo
- Michele Balducci: Bea's boyfriend

== See also ==
- List of Italian television series
