= Come tu mi vuoi (film) =

- Theatrical release poster
- Directed by: Volfango De Biasi
- Written by: Alessandra Magnaghi; Volfango De Biasi; Tiziana Martini; Gabriella Tomassetti
- Produced by: Claudio Saraceni; Jacopo Saraceni; Federico Saraceni
- Starring: Cristiana Capotondi; Nicolas Vaporidis
- Cinematography: John Canevari
- Edited by: Stefano Chierchiè
- Music by: Michael Braga
- Production company: Ideacinema
- Distributed by: Medusa Film
- Release date: 9 November 2007
- Running time: 107 minutes
- Country: Italy
- Language: Italian

Come tu mi vuoi it's the 2007 debut film of director Volfango de Biasi, it stars Nicolas Vaporidis and Cristiana Capotondi.

== Plot ==
Giada, a student of communication sciences in Rome, is the typical "nerd", clumsy, scruffy, "nerdy", dressed out of fashion girl, who neglects herself, to devote herself to her studies only. Of humble origins, to sustain herself economically, she works in a restaurant as a waitress and does tutoring. Riccardo instead, is a "trust-fund baby", dedicated only to his social life, made of evenings with friends and nights at the clubs.

His loose ways and disastrous university path lead Riccardo's father to threaten him with cutting off his funds in the absence of good scholastic results. This is how the paths of the two intersect. Riccardo's friends, similar to him in terms of habits, gossip and frivolity, advise him to seduce the girl to get free tutoring.

Actually Riccardo, even if not physically attracted to Giada, is vaguely fascinated by the girl's eccentric personality and decides to give it a try. The plan initially works and Giada lets herself be seduced by Riccardo. But she, aware of the great difference between their lifestyles, she decides to change to attract him. In this she gets help from Fiamma, a hyper-snob friend of Riccardo, who decides to mentor her.

Thanks to Fiamma's beauty treatment and advices on how to behave around boys, Giada becomes much prettier and manages to impress Riccardo, who is pleasantly impressed by her transformation. However, this is not enough to make the relationship work and, above all, it does not prevent Riccardo from having flings. Giada, disappointed in Riccardo, decides to end their relationship definitively, but Riccardo, having come to the realization that he's in love with Giada, decides to leave his old habits, as well as his snobbish and superficial friends, behind.

During an exam, Riccardo discovers that Giada is the professor's assistant and sees in her what the other girls had, seducing the teacher with her body to achieve her goals. Riccardo asks Giada to question him, improved in his studies however, he goes beyond the simple university exam, trying to open Giada's eyes, revealing his feelings for her to her.

Riccardo leaves resigned but Giada understands that the boy has really changed, and being she too is still in love with her, she runs to him. She finds him on the roof of the headquarters where they share a passionate kiss and get back together.

== Cast ==
- Cristiana Capotondi as Giada
- Nicolas Vaporidis as Riccardo
- Giulia Steigerwalt as Fiamma
- Niccolò Senni as Loris
- Elisa Di Eusanio as Sara
- Paola Carleo as Alessia
- Paola Roberti as Katia
- Marco Foschi as Hermes
- Roberto Di Palma as Peppe
- Luigi Diberti as Giuseppe
- Gianfranco Barra as Professor

== Production ==
The film is produced by Ideacinema for Medusa Film.

== Release date ==
The film was released in Italian theaters on November 9, 2007.

== Soundtrack ==
=== Tracklist ===
1. CCCP Fedeli alla linea – Sono come tu mi vuoi – 4:30
2. Jamelia – Beware of the Dog – 3:11
3. Phoenix – If I Ever Feel Better – 4:27
4. Le Vibrazioni – Vieni da me – 4:10
5. Holy Ghost! – Superman
6. Sophie Ellis-Bextor – Murder on the Dancefloor – 3:52
7. Keane – This Is the Last Time – 3:28
8. Bodyrockers – I Like the Way You Move – 3:20
9. Blonde Redhead – Hated Because of Great Qualities – 4:43
10. Marco Bellotti – Come tu mi vuoi
11. Turin Brakes – Fishing For A Dream – 4:29
