= Daniele Pecci =

Italian actor and director (born 1970)

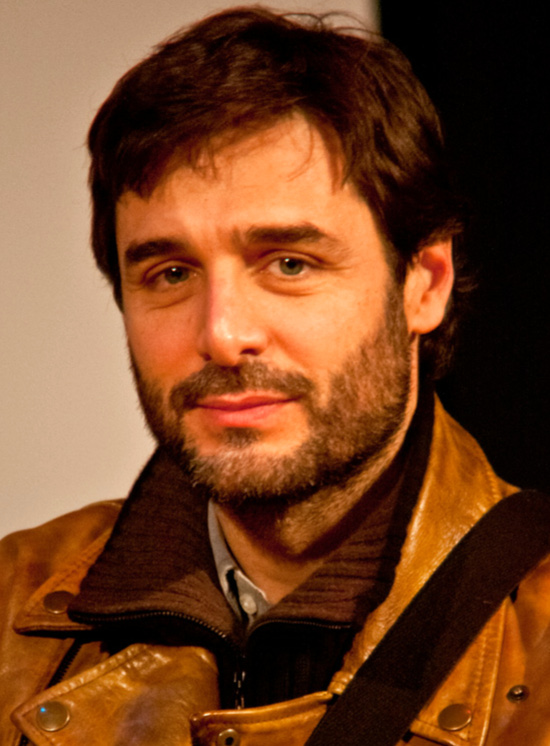
- Pecci in April 2011.
- Born: 23 May 1970 (age 56); Rome, Lazio, Italy
- Occupations: Actor, director
- Years active: 1990–present

Daniele Pecci (born 23 May 1970) is an Italian actor and director.

Born in Rome, Lazio in the noble Pecci family (the family of Pope Leo XIII), Pecci has worked in theater as an actor and director since 1990. He rose to prominence in 2004 when he received a main role in Orgoglio on the television channel Rai Uno. The series ran from 2004 to 2006, and he appeared in all 39 episodes.
