= I liceali =

- Genre: Teen drama
- Created by: Pietro Valsecchi
- Starring: Giorgio Tirabassi; Claudia Pandolfi; Massimo Poggio; Christiane Filangieri; Ivano Marescotti; Diane Fleri; Federico Costantini; Carolina Benvenga; Emanuele Propizio; Alberto Galetti; Alessandro Sperduti; Chiara Mastalli; Federico Galante; Angel Tom Karumathy; Ivan Olita; Giulia Elettra Gorietti; Tommaso Arnaldi; Carlotta Tesconi
- Country of origin: Italy
- Original language: Italian
- No. of seasons: 3
- No. of episodes: 20 (list of episodes)

Production
- Production location: Rome
- Running time: 100 minutes
- Production companies: Mediaset; Taoduefilm

Original release
- Network: Canale 5
- Release: May 14, 2008 – July 6, 2011

I liceali (English: the students of high school) is an Italian television teen drama ended in 2011. It is made of three seasons.

== Plot ==
The show is about a group of students from a prestigious high school in Rome.

== See also ==
- List of Italian television series
