= Sbirri =

- Directed by: Roberto Burchielli
- Produced by: Raoul Bova; Chiara Giordano; Mauro Parissone; Laura Guglielmetti
- Starring: Raoul Bova; Luca Angeletti; Simonetta Solder; Alessandro Sperduti
- Distributed by: Medusa
- Release date: April 10, 2009 (Italy)
- Running time: 104 minutes
- Language: Italian
- Box office: 1.715.000 €

Sbirri is a 2009 Italian crime drama film, directed by Roberto Burchielli. It was released in Italy on April 10, 2009.

Notably, Sbirri blends fiction with real footage; many scenes were filmed during actual police operations, with Bova participating alongside officers from Milan's Widespread Criminality Operating Unit (UOCD).

The film received the Audience Award at the Annecy Italian Cinema Festival in 2009.

== Plot ==
The protagonist is a journalist (Raoul Bova) who is always away from home. He is advised of the death of his son Marco from an Ecstasy overdose. Even though his pregnant wife is unstable because of Marco's death, he decides to join an anti-drug police team of the Widespread Criminality Operating Unit in Milan and films the cops' activities.
