= Cristiana Capotondi =

Italian actress (born 1980)

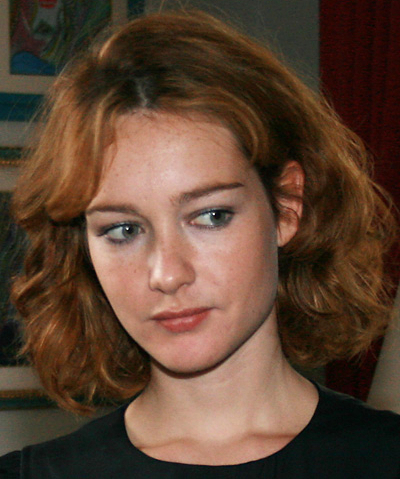
- Born: 13 September 1980 (age 45); Rome, Italy
- Occupation: Actress
- Years active: 1993–present
- Partner: Andrea Pezzi (2005–2021)
- Website: www.cristianacapotondi.com

Cristiana Capotondi (born 13 September 1980) is an Italian actress.

== Early life and career ==
Capotondi was born in Rome to an Italian family of mixed Italian Catholic and Italian Jewish background (her maternal grandfather was Jewish). Growing up in Rome, she celebrated both Christian and Jewish holidays, such as Yom Kippur and Rosh Hashanah, and visited both church and synagogue. She graduated from the Università La Sapienza in Rome with a degree in communication sciences.

Capotondi first gained popularity in a commercial for the Motta Maxibon ice cream. Her acting career began at the age of 13 in the Italian series Amico mio, aired by RAI.

Capotondi debuted in cinema in 1995 with the comedy Vacanze di Natale '95. Between 1993 and 2006 she worked mostly in television, starring in the series Orgoglio from 2004 to 2006. She gained additional exposure in the film Notte prima degli esami (2006), in which she starred as a main character alongside Nicolas Vaporidis. In 2009 Capotondi played Empress Elisabeth of Austria in the ZDF/Rai Uno/ORF co-production Sisi.

She was the spokeswoman of the 2011 Giro d'Italia.

== Personal life ==
After a ten-year relationship with a man who was not part of the entertainment world, she dated colleagues Nicolas Vaporidis and Primo Reggiani. She dated entrepreneur and former TV presenter Andrea Pezzi from 2005 to 2021. She has a daughter, who was born in 2022.

== Filmography ==
=== Films ===
| Year | Title | Role(s) | Notes |
|---|---|---|---|
| 1995 | Vacanze di Natale '95 | Marta Colombo | |
| 1999 | Il cielo in una stanza | Federica | |
| 2004 | To Sleep Next To Her | Laura | |
| 2004 | Forse sì, forse no | Valentina | |
| 2004 | Christmas in Love | Monica Baldi | |
| 2005 | Iris Blu | Iris | Short film |
| 2006 | Notte prima degli esami | Claudia Martinelli | |
| 2007 | Scrivilo sui muri | Sole | |
| 2007 | I Viceré | Teresa Uzeda | |
| 2007 | Come tu mi vuoi | Giada Ferretti | |
| 2009 | Many Kisses Later | Giulia | |
| 2010 | La Passione | Flaminia Sbarbato | |
| 2010 | From the Waist Up | Katia | |
| 2011 | The Worst Week of My Life | Margherita | |
| 2011 | Kryptonite! | Titina | |
| 2011 | The Wholly Family | Mother | Short film |
| 2012 | The Worst Christmas of My Life | Margherita | |
| 2012 | Hotel Transylvania | Mavis (voice) | Italian dub; voice role |
| 2013 | Amiche da morire | Olivia | |
| 2013 | The Mafia Kills Only in Summer | Flora Guarneri | |
| 2013 | Guess Who's Coming for Christmas? | Valentina Sereni | |
| 2014 | Amori elementari | Sara | |
| 2014 | A Golden Boy | Silvia | |
| 2014 | Soap Opera | Anna Roselli | |
| 2015 | Hotel Transylvania 2 | Mavis (voice) | Italian dub; voice role |
| 2015 | In ritardo | Her | Short film |
| 2016 | Tommaso | Federica | |
| 2016 | 7 Minutes | Isabella | |
| 2017 | Metti una notte | Gaia | |
| 2018 | A Woman's Name | Nina Martini | |
| 2018 | Hotel Transylvania 3: Summer Vacation | Mavis (voice) | Italian dub; voice role |
| 2019 | Beware the Gorilla | Emma | |
| 2022 | Hotel Transylvania: Transformania | Mavis (voice) | Italian dub; voice role |
| 2024 | Succede anche nelle migliori famiglie | Isabella Di Rienzo | |

=== Television ===
| Year | Title | Role(s) | Notes |
|---|---|---|---|
| 1993 | Amico mio | Helene | Episode: "Non te ne andare!" |
| 1994 | Italian Restaurant | Angie | Main role |
| 1998 | Un nero per casa | Valentina Paradisi | Television film |
| 1998 | SPQR | Alessia Appio | Main role |
| 1998 | Anni '50 | Marisa Proitetti | Main role |
| 1999 | Anni '60 | Alessandra Diamanti | Main role |
| 2000 | Piovuto dal cielo | Assuntina Quagliaulo | Television film |
| 2001 | Angelo il custode | Sara | Main role |
| 2001 | Compagni di scuola | Martina Antonelli | Main role |
| 2002 | Il giovane Casanova | Manon Baletti | Television film |
| 2002 | La casa dell'angelo | Chiara Meyer | Television film |
| 2004–2006 | Orgoglio | Aurora Obrofari | Main role |
| 2006 | Joe Petrosino | Giuseppina Petrosino | Television film |
| 2008 | Rebecca, la mia prima moglie | Jennifer de Winter | Television film |
| 2009 | Sissi | Elisabeth of Austria | Lead role |
| 2012 | Merlin | Ginevra | Television film |
| 2012 | Barabbas | Ester | Television film |
| 2014 | Purché finisca bene | Alessia Rocchi | Episode: "Un marito di troppo" |
| 2017 | Di padre in figlia | Maria Teresa Franza | Main role |
| 2018 | Liberi sognatori | Renata Fonte | Episode: "Una donna contro tutti - Renata Fonte" |
| 2019 | Ognuno è perfetto | Miriam | Main role |
| 2020 | Bella da morire | Eva Cantini | Main role |
| 2022 | The Ignorant Angels | Antonia | Lead role |
| 2025 | La ricetta della felicità | Marta Rampini | Lead role |
