= Michele Balducci =

Italian actor (born 1986)

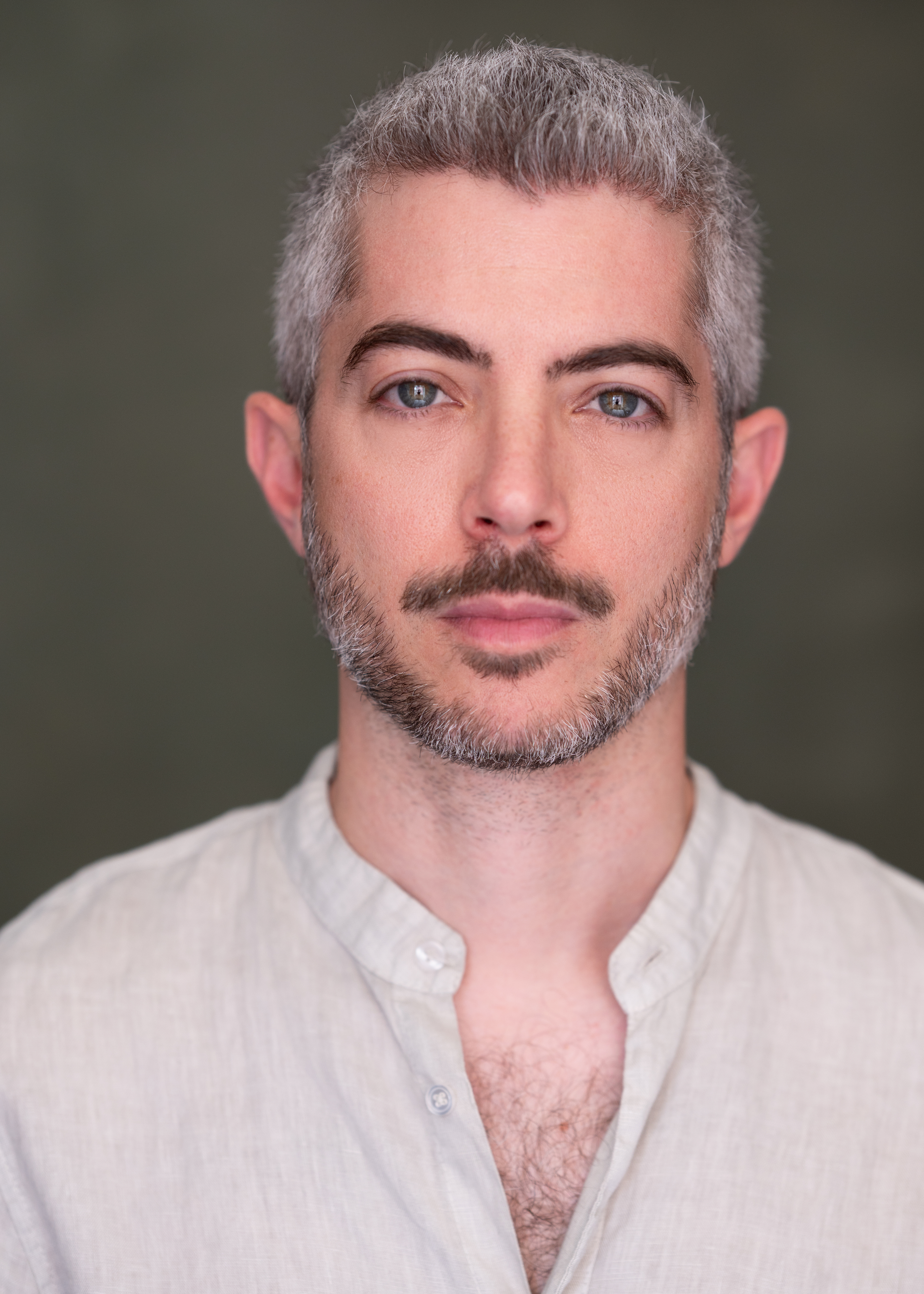
- A portrait of actor Michele Balducci
- Born: Michele Balducci; 3 September 1986 (age 40); Umbertide, Italy
- Occupations: actor; director; playwright
- Years active: 2008–present
- Website: mikele86.wix.com/michelebalducci#!home/mainPage

Michele Balducci is an Italian actor, director and playwright.

== Biography ==
Born in Umbertide and raised in Bastia Umbra, Italy, he later on moved to Rome, where he lives. After studying acting in Perugia (at Centro Teatrale Universitario), Rome (at La maschera in soffitta and with acting coaches Gisella Burinato and Ivana Chubbuck), Milan (with actor Filippo Timi) and London (at Guildhall School of Music and Drama), he made his television debut at age 21, in 2008, with two small roles in La scelta di Laura, directed by Alessandro Piva, and Amiche mie, directed by Paolo Genovese and Luca Miniero. He then went on appearing in many successful TV series, such as Don Matteo, directed by Giulio Base, and Inspector Rex, directed by Marco Serafini. In 2013, he has a leading role in the very popular TV miniseries Pupetta – Il coraggio e la passione, directed by Luciano Odorisio. In 2014 he is part of the main cast of the TV movie Francesco, directed by Liliana Cavani in English for the European market. In 2018 he is part of the recurring cast of Season 2 of Medici on Netflix. In 2024 he was part of the international cast of Those About to Die, directed by Roland Emmerich on Peacock and Amazon Prime Video.

He made his big screen debut in 2009 with Meno male che ci sei, directed by Luis Prieto.

In theatre, he has worked with many directors, such as Romeo Castellucci (Natura e origine della mente) and Marco Maltauro (Grumi - memorie del cazzo). In 2015 he starred in the new play written and directed by Luca De Bei, Nessuno muore and was part of the main cast of Rise and Fall of the City of Mahagonny, directed by Graham Vick at the Rome Opera House. He has worked with renowned Italian theatre director and author Liv Ferracchiati in two shows: Todi is a small town in the center of Italy, part of the Venice Biennale program of events in 2017, and Commedia con schianto - struttura di un fallimento tragico, selected for RomaEuropa Festival program in 2019. He wrote, directed and starred in Sandro, a monologue based on the Italian poet Sandro Penna, in 2021. In 2022 and 2023 he starred in the experimental play XYZ. Dialoghi leggeri tra inutili generazioni directed by movie and theatre director Andrea Adriatico. He worked again with Adriatico in 2024 starring in the play Evǝ and in 2025 starring in the play Il piacere.

In 2010 he started his activity as a playwright by writing three short plays (Vivo, Le mie muse and Violetta – the latter is included in the book La mia poetica, published by Editoria&Spettacolo in 2012), and a play (In mezzo al core).

He obtained a degree in Medicine with a thesis in psychiatry, but he never practiced as a medician.

== Selected credits ==
=== Stage ===
- 7 sogni, directed by Alessandro Fea (2010)
- Tremori, directed by Marisa Vallone (2010)
- Rabarbaro, directed by Niccolò Matcovich (2010)
- 5x4, directed by Alessandro Fea (2010)
- Vulcano, directed by Virginia Franchi (2011)
- Spell - L'amore di Alda, directed by Alessandro Fea (2011)
- I principi che eravamo, directed by Francesco Piotti (2012)
- Grumi - memorie del cazzo, directed by Marco Maltauro (2012)
- The first hour, directed by Virginia Franchi (2013)
- Boy disappears, directed by Anita Otto (2013)
- Natura e origine della mente, directed by Romeo Castellucci (2013)
- Nessuno muore, directed by Luca De Bei (2015)
- Rise and Fall of the City of Mahagonny, directed by Graham Vick (2015)
- Le scoperte geografiche, directed by Virginia Franchi (2016)
- Persone naturali e strafottenti, directed by Giancarlo Nicoletti (2016)
- Todi is a small town in the center of Italy, directed by Liv Ferracchiati (2017)
- Commedia con schianto - struttura di un fallimento tragico, directed by Liv Ferracchiati (2018)
- La vendita delle fanciulle ai mercanti, directed by Luigi Presicce (2019)
- Edipo Re, directed by Chiara Guidi (2019)
- Vorrei scrivere in tratti di fuoco, directed by Andrea Baracco (2020)
- Sandro, directed by Michele Balducci (2021)
- XYZ. Dialoghi leggeri tra inutili generazioni, directed by Andrea Adriatico (2022)
- Le amarezze, directed by Andrea Adriatico (2023)
- Evǝ, directed by Andrea Adriatico (2024)
- Il piacere, directed by Andrea Adriatico (2025)

=== Filmography ===
- Meno male che ci sei, directed by Luis Prieto (2009)

=== Television ===
- La scelta di Laura, directed by Alessandro Piva (2008)
- Amiche mie, directed by Paolo Genovese and Luca Miniero (2008)
- Don Matteo, directed by Giulio Base (2009)
- Inspector Rex, directed by Marco Serafini (2011)
- Pupetta - Il coraggio e la passione, directed by Luciano Odorisio (2013)
- Deadboy, directed by Alessio Russo (2013)
- Disordini, directed by Sandro Vanadia (2013)
- Francesco, directed by Liliana Cavani (2014)
- BLEAH!, directed by Veronica Pivetti (2018)
- Medici (TV series), directed by Jon Cassar and Jan Michelini (2018)
- Those About to Die, directed by Roland Emmerich (2024)
