= I Kill =

2010 novel by Giorgio Faletti

I kill
- Italian language original book title and cover Io uccido (2002)
- Author: Giorgio Faletti
- Original title: Io uccido
- Language: English
- Genre: Crime fiction
- Publisher: Constable
- Publication date: 3 June 2010
- Media type: Print Paperback
- Pages: 624

I kill is a thriller written by Giorgio Faletti. The book was translated from Italian and became a best seller, selling millions of copies and published in 27 editions, to English, in which it also went on to become a best seller, published in 10 editions.

The Italian edition was published in Milan in 2002. The English language translation by the author was first published in Milan by Baldini Castoldi Dalai in 2008 (ISBN 9788860732958) and in 2010 in London by Constable (ISBN 9781849012959).
