= Elena Russo =

Italian actress

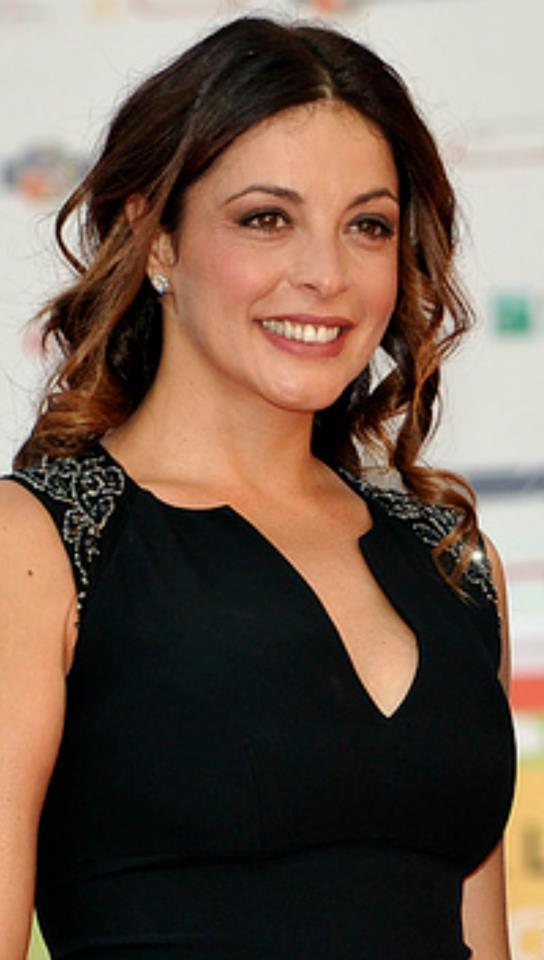
- Elena Russo in 2013
- Born: 13 February 1971 (age 55); Naples, Campania, Italy
- Occupation: Actress
- Website: http://www.elenarusso.it/

Elena Russo (born 13 February 1971) is an Italian actress of cinema, television and theatre.

== Career ==
Elena Russo was born in Naples, Campania, but she moved to Rome, where she started her career as an actress. Her debut was in the film Finalmente soli (1997), directed by Umberto Marino, followed by Besame mucho (1999), by Maurizio Ponzi, and Amor nello specchio (1999), by Salvatore Maira.

In 2002, she is the protagonist of the film N'gopp - Lasciatemi sognare. In 2003 she has an important role in Tutto in quella notte, directed by Franco Bertini, and she is the protagonist of the short Non può piovere sempre, directed by Alfio D'Agata. In 2006 she starred, along with Neri Marcorè and Vincenzo Salemme, in Baciami piccola, directed by Roberto Cimpanelli.

She also worked in a lot of television series or television film, like Orgoglio (as Clara Dani), Amiche mie, L'onore e il rispetto (as Assunta Rocca), Sangue caldo (as Concetta "Ciacià" Lorusso), Rodolfo Valentino - La leggenda (as Rosa Cuccurullo), Furore - Il vento della speranza (as Sofia Fiore) and La luna e il lago.

== Filmography ==
=== Film ===
- Finalmente soli (1997)
- Besame mucho (1999)
- Amor nello specchio (1999)
- L'uomo della fortuna (2000)
- La vita è un gioco (2000)
- E adesso sesso (2001)
- N'gopp - Lasciatemi sognare (2002)
- Tutto in quella notte (2003)
- Baciami piccina (2006)
- Io non ci casco (2008)
- Baarìa (2009)
- Ce n'è per tutti (2009)
- Sharm el Sheikh - Un'estate indimenticabile (2010)
- Buona giornata (2013)

=== Television ===
- Il maresciallo Rocca (1998)
- Il delitto nel cortile (1999)
- Storia di guerra e d'amicizia (2002)
- Ma il portiere non c'è mai? (2002)
- Don Matteo (2002)
- Vento di ponente (2003–2004)
- Orgoglio (2004–2006)
- Grandi domani (2005)
- L'uomo sbagliato (2005)
- Elisa di Rivombrosa (2005)
- La luna e il lago (2006)
- Io non dimentico (2008)
- Amiche mie (2008)
- L'onore e il rispetto (2009)
- Sangue caldo (2011)
- I cerchi nell'acqua (2011)
- Rodolfo Valentino - La leggenda (2014)
- Furore - Il vento della speranza (2014–?)

=== Theatre ===
- Il Topo Nel Cortile (2013)
