= Guess Who's Coming for Christmas? =

- Theatrical release poster
- Directed by: Fausto Brizzi
- Written by: Fausto Brizzi; Fabio Bonifacci; Marco Martani
- Produced by: Fausto Brizzi
- Starring: Diego Abatantuono; Raoul Bova; Cristiana Capotondi; Claudia Gerini; Claudio Bisio; Carlo Buccirosso; Angela Finocchiaro; Rosalia Porcaro
- Cinematography: Mark Melville
- Edited by: Luciana Pandolfelli
- Music by: Paolo Buonvino
- Production companies: Wideside; Colorado Film
- Distributed by: Medusa Film
- Release date: 19 December 2013
- Running time: 90 minutes
- Language: Italian

Guess Who's Coming for Christmas? (Italian: Indovina chi viene a Natale?) is a 2013 Italian Christmas comedy film produced, co-written and directed by Fausto Brizzi.

== Plot ==
The Sereni family meets in the grandparents' house for Christmas holidays: Chiara is divorced, with two children to be kept, and falls in love with the careless Domenico. The children create so much trouble, so that the mother and Domenico will separate; Dad Giulio is terrified because his daughter Valentina is engaged to Francesco, a handsome boy who does not have arms because of an accident. In addition to this, he has to put up with his brother Antonio, who wants to offer a fictions on TV about the figure of his father, who died a few months ago. The family atmosphere is not the best, but at New Year's tensions are resolved into a nice champagne toast.

== Cast ==
- Claudio Bisio as Domenico
- Cristiana Capotondi as Valentina Sereni
- Claudia Gerini as Chiara Sereni
- Carlo Buccirosso as Antonio Sereni
- Raoul Bova as Francesco
- Angela Finocchiaro as Marina
- Diego Abatantuono as Giulio Sereni
- Gigi Proietti as Leonardo Sereni
- Rosalia Porcaro as Elisa
- Isa Barzizza as Grandma Emma
- Massimo Ghini as Policeman
- Fausto Brizzi as Policeman

== See also ==
- List of Christmas films
