= Paul VI: The Pope in the Tempest =

- Genre: Biographical drama
- Written by: Francesco Arlanch; Maura Nuccetelli; Gianmario Pagano
- Directed by: Fabrizio Costa
- Starring: Fabrizio Gifuni; Mauro Marino; Antonio Catania
- Composer: Marco Frisina
- Country of origin: Italy
- Original language: Italian

Production
- Cinematography: Giovanni Galasso
- Running time: 200 min.

Original release
- Network: Rai 1
- Release: November 30, 2008

Paul VI: The Pope in the Tempest (Italian: Paolo VI - Il Papa nella tempesta) is a 2008 Italian biographical drama television movie directed by Fabrizio Costa. The film is based on real life events of Roman Catholic Pope Paul VI.

== Plot ==
During the kidnapping of Aldo Moro, Pope Paul reflects about his life: As the young priest don Battista Montini, he studies French philosophers with students (some of them would found the Christian Democracy) in spite of the Fascist pressure. He is called to serve the Papal curia of Pius XII in Rome. He watches how the Holy See and Fascist Italy sign the 1929 Concordat. He tries to protect the victims of Fascism and Allied bombing during the World War. He is sent as bishop of Milan, the biggest diocese. There he approaches the workers and the poor, who feel the Church is far from them, in a campaign of mission for a "civilization of love". He is made a cardinal by Pope John XXIII. He is called to participate in the Second Vatican Council. After the pope's death, he is elected the new pope. He follows the work of the council. The encyclicals he issues have uneasy receptions. Populorum Progressio is taken by some to encourage armed revolution against tyranny. This includes Roberto, a young rebel man, son of a family friends of Montini. Roberto argues with his parents and becomes more and more radicalized. Pope Paul becomes a travelling pope. He pilgrims to Jordan-administered Jerusalem, where he tries to bridge with the Eastern Orthodox Church. In the Holy Land, the pope consoles an Arab Christian bed-ridden old man. Humane Vitae disappoints those who expect the Church to accept a more modern view of sexuality. At the same time, there are those who, like Marcel Lefebvre, reject the Council innovations. The pope suffers because in spite of directly appealing to the Red Brigades, his friend the Italian prime minister Aldo Moro is executed. However Roberto confesses that his appeal made him renounce violence.

== Cast ==
- Fabrizio Gifuni as Giovanni Battista Montini
- Mauro Marino as Don Pasquale Macchi
- Antonio Catania as Padre Giulio Bevilacqua
- Luca Lionello as Don Leone
- Sergio Tardioli as Don Primo Mazzolari
- Claudio Botosso as Roberto Poloni
- Licia Maglietta as Maria Colpani
- Fabrizio Bucci as Matteo Poloni
- Mariano Rigillo as Cardinal Eugène Tisserant
- Giovanni Visentin as Cardinal Francesco Marchetti Selvaggiani
- Sergio Fiorentini as Cardinal Pietro Gasparri
- Luciano Virgilio as Cardinal Ugo Poletti
- Pietro Biondi as Cardinal Jean-Marie Villot
- Gaetano Aronica as Aldo Moro
- Luis Molteni as Angelo Roncalli
- Angelo Maggi as Eugenio Pacelli
- Nicola D'Eramo as Marcel Lefebvre
- Carlo Cartier as Pope Pius XI
- Maciej Robakiewicz as Karol Wojtyła
