= Primo Mazzolari =

The Reverend Father Primo Mazzolari
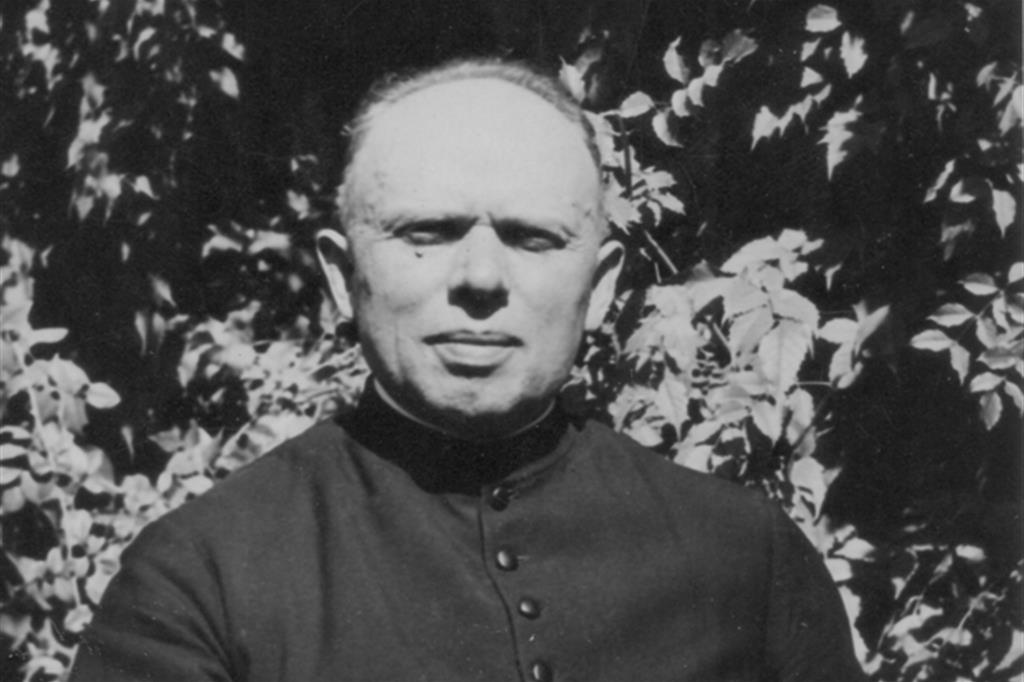
- Church: Catholic Church

Orders
- Ordination: 24 August 1912

Personal details
- Born: Primo Mazzolari; 13 January 1890 Cremona, Italy
- Died: 12 April 1959 (aged 69) Bozzolo, Italy
- Buried: St Peter's church, Bozzolo
- Denomination: Catholic (Latin Church)

Ordination history of Primo Mazzolari
History
Priestly ordination
- Ordained by: Bishop Giacinto Gaggia

Primo Mazzolari (13 January 1890 – 12 April 1959), best known as don Primo, was an Italian priest of the Catholic Church. He was also a partisan and writer who established the review Adesso ("Now") in 1949.

Known as the priest of Bozzolo, his thoughts anticipated some of the orientations of the Second Vatican Council, especially about the "Church of the Poor", religious freedom, and pluralism.

From the start of the 1950s, don Primo developed a social doctrine with empathy towards the disadvantaged (where a lot of people depend on charity) and pacifism, which earned him criticism and sanctions from the ecclesiastical authorities and led to his being marginalized in his own parish of Bozzolo.

In 1955, in the anonymous publication Tu non-uccidere (You, don't kill), don Primo attacked the doctrine of just war and the ideology of victory, in the name of nonviolence, and in support of a Movement "... of Christian resistance against war ..." and for justice and peace.

It was only at the end of the 1950s, in the last months of his life, that don Primo began to receive the first approval of the ecclesiastical authorities. In November 1957, the archbishop of Milan Montini, future Pope Paul VI, called on him to preach in his diocese.

In February 1959, Pope John XXIII received him in a private audience and publicly called him the "Tromba dello spirito santo nella Bassa Padana" (Trumpet of the Holy Spirit in Bassa Padana).

On 20 June 2017, Pope Francis visited Bozzolo and gave a speech and prayed at Primo Mazzolari's tomb, meeting with members of Fondazione (Foundation) Mazzolari, including its head and the head of its academic committee. The occasion was part of a one-day helicopter pilgrimage of the Pope to two locations in Italy: to Bozzolo, and then to Barbiana, a parish associated with the work of the priest-educationalist and conscientious objector Lorenzo Milani.

== Life ==
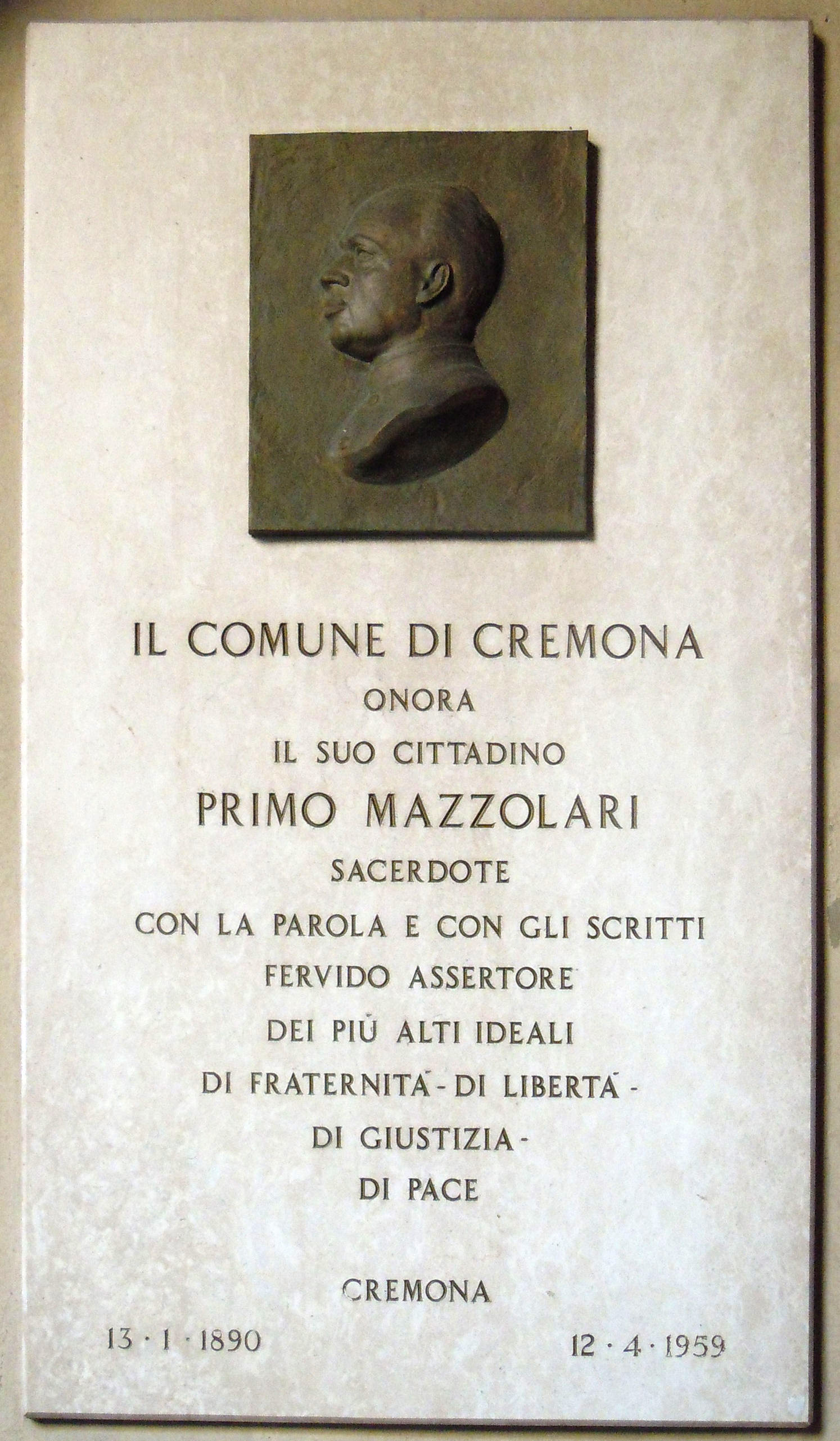
Plaque commemorating Mazzolari in Cremona.

Born in 1890, he was ordained a priest by bishop Giacinto Gaggia in 1912. In 1915 he was a soldier during the First World War and became a military chaplain in 1918.

In 1921 he was appointed parish priest in Cicognara, a hamlet of Viadana, in Lombardy. In 1925 he was denounced by the fascists because he refused to sing the Te Deum after the attempted attack on Mussolini by Tito Zaniboni.

On the night of 1 August 1931, someone called to the priest from outside his presbytery; when he came out two revolver shots were fired at him, but both missed.

In 1932, he was transferred to the parish of Bozzolo, where he spent the rest of his life.

From 8 September 1943, he was active in the struggle to liberate Italy and encouraged young people to participate. He saved many people from deportation. In July 1944, he was imprisoned by the police and then released. The fascists forced him to live in an isolated manner until 25 April 1945.

After the Second World War, the National Association of the Partisans of Italy of Cremona granted him the title of partisan.

== Bibliography ==
- Il mio parroco. Confidenze di un povero prete di campagna (1932, Dehoniane)
- La più bella avventura. Sulla traccia del 'prodigo' (1934, Dehoniane)
- Lettera sulla parrocchia. Invito alla discussione (1937, Dehoniane)
- Il samaritano. Elevazioni per gli uomini del nostro tempo (1938, Dehoniane)
- I lontani. Motivi di apostolato avventuroso (1938, Dehoniane)
- Tra l'argine e il bosco (1938, Dehoniane)
- La via crucis del povero (1938, Dehoniane)
- Tempo di credere (1941, Dehoniane; re-edit. 2010 EDB)
- Anch'io voglio bene al Papa (1942, Dehoniane)
- Dietro la Croce (1942, Dehoniane)
- Impegno con Cristo (1943, Dehoniane)
- La Samaritana (1944, Dehoniane)
- Il compagno Cristo. Vangelo del reduce (1945, Dehoniane)
- La pieve sull'argine (1952, Dehoniane)
- Il segno dei chiodi (1954, Dehoniane)
- La parola che non-passa (1954, Dehoniane)
- Tu non-uccidere (1955, San Paolo)
- La parrocchia (1957, La Locusta)
- I preti sanno morire (1958, Dehoniane)
- La Carità del Papa, Pio XII e la ricostruzione dell'Italia, (Edizioni Paoline, 1991)
- Della Fede (1943; re-edit. 2013 EDB)

== Filmography ==
The Italian fictional TV series L'uomo dell'argine is about don Primo's life.

In the Italian mini-series Paul VI: The Pope in the Tempest, Sergio Tardioli plays Mazzolari.

== Gallery ==
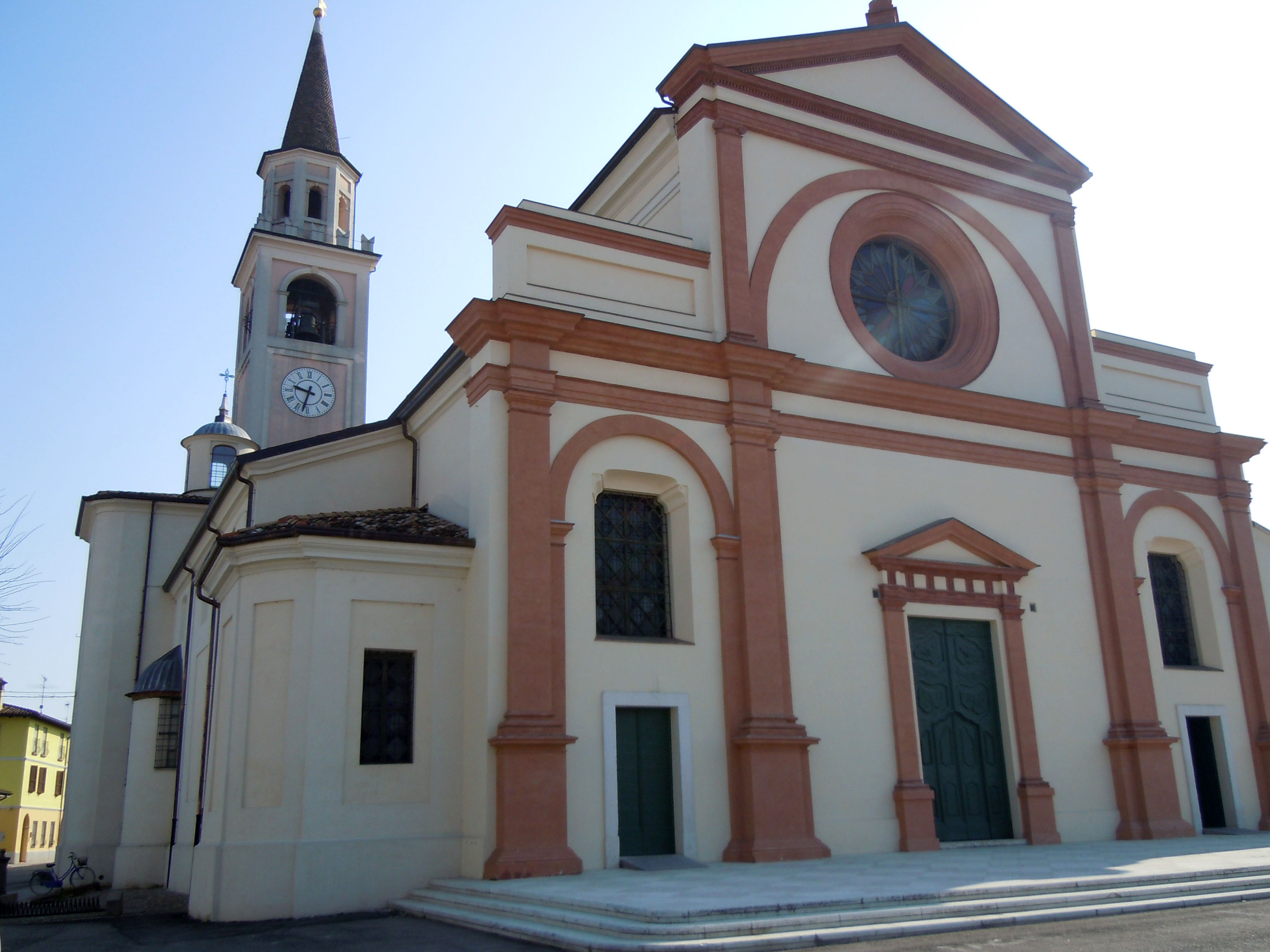
St Peter's church, in Bozzolo, where don Primo is interred
