= Non lasciamoci più =

- Directed by: Vittorio Sindoni
- Country of origin: Italy
- No. of seasons: 2
- No. of episodes: 14

Original release
- Network: Rai 1
- Release: 1999 – 2001

Non lasciamoci più is an Italian comedy television series.

== Cast ==
- Fabrizio Frizzi: Lawyer Paolo Bonelli
- Debora Caprioglio: Laura Bini
- Paolo Ferrari: Paolo's Father
- Isa Barzizza: Paolo's Mother
- Pino Caruso: Laura's Father
- Sandro Ghiani: Mr. Pedretti
- Angelo Orlando: Enea
- Gegia: Carmelina

== See also ==
- List of Italian television series
