= Clare and Francis =

2007 Italian television film

- Written by: Francesco Arlanch
- Directed by: Fabrizio Costa
- Starring: Ettore Bassi; Maria Palma Petruolo; Gabriele Cirilli; Lando Buzzanca; Ángela Molina
- Composer: Marco Frisina
- Country of origin: Italy
- Original language: Italian

Production
- Producer: Luca Bernabei
- Cinematography: Giovanni Galasso
- Editor: Alessandro Lucidi
- Running time: 201 min.

Original release
- Network: Rai 1
- Release: 2007

Clare and Francis (Italian: Chiara e Francesco) is a 2007 Italian television film directed by Fabrizio Costa. The film deals with the friendship and the spiritual journey of Francis of Assisi and Clare of Assisi.

== Cast ==
- Ettore Bassi as Francis of Assisi
- Maria Palma Petruolo as Clare of Assisi
- Gabriele Cirilli as Illuminatus
- Lando Buzzanca as Pietro di Bernardone
- Ángela Molina as Pica
- Antonella Fattori as Ortolana
- Luca Biagini as Cardinal Pelagio
- Fabrizio Bucci as Bernard
- Ignazio Oliva as Elias
- Diego Casale as Giles
- Ivano Marescotti as Monaldo
- Ivan Franek as Federico
- Vincent Riotta as Favarone
- Roberto Nobile as Bishop Guido
- Luigi Diberti as Pope Innocent VIII

== Production ==
The film was shot between Tunis, Rome, Gubbio and Bevagna.

== Reception ==
Corriere della Sera television critic Aldo Grasso criticised the film for its lack of spiritual elements. When asked for their opinion, the conventual friars of the Sacro Convento in Assisi had mixed views, praising its historical rigour, lack of rhetorics and acting performances, but finding some inadequacy in representing the theological and human depth of Francis.
