= Vento di ponente =

Italian television series

- Country of origin: Italy
- No. of seasons: 2
- No. of episodes: 31

Original release
- Network: Rai 2
- Release: 2002 – 2004

Vento di ponente is an Italian television series.

== Cast ==
- Serena Autieri: Francesca Ghiglione
- Enrico Mutti: Marco Decaro
- Anna Kanakis: Paola Ghiglione
- Paolo Calissano: Guido Mandelli
- Maria Monti: Emma Ghiglione
- Toni Marsina: Sebastiano Ghiglione
- Martine Brochard: Sofia Ghiglione
- Cosimo Cinieri: Giacomo Decaro
- Benedetta Buccellato: Costanza Decaro
- Barbara Rizzo: Stefania Decaro
- Giorgio Biavati: Ernesto Rocca
- Daniela Poggi: Carlotta Maggi
- Antonio Manzini: Pietro Ferrando
- Roberto Alpi: Alberto Cortesi
- Orsetta De Rossi: Giulia Mori
- Vincenzo Diglio: Max
- Anna Safroncik: Ljuba Moric
- Elena Russo: Marina
- Sara D'Amario: Silvia Fossati
- Marius Verdesi: Boris Moric
- Shel Shapiro: Raimond Foster
- Emanuela Rossi: ginecologa
- Rodolfo Bigotti: Paolo
- Brando Giorgi: Rodolfo Viali
- Guido Caprino: Alessandro

== See also ==
- List of Italian television series
