= Maria Entraigues =

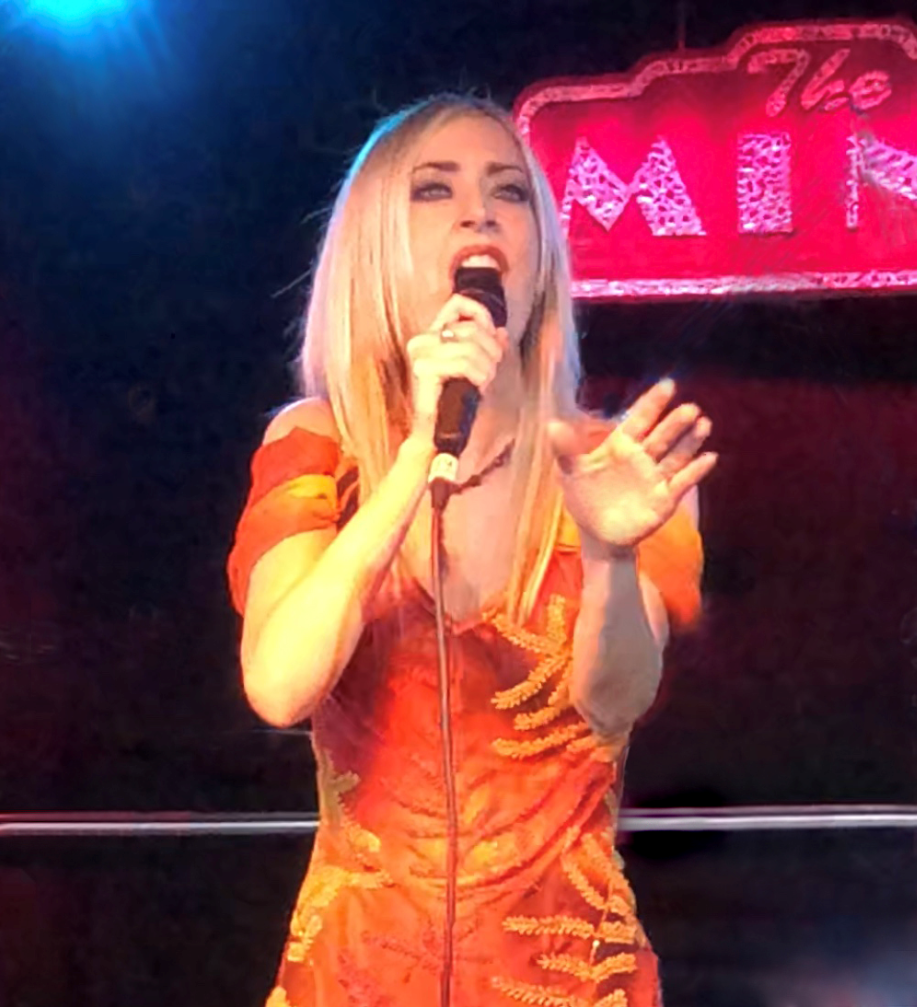
- Maria Entraigues performing in December 2017
- Born: Maria Entraigues; Buenos Aires, Argentina
- Other name: Maria Maria
- Occupations: Director of Development for the SENS Research Foundation; Professional singer; composer; actress; longevity advocate and spokesperson; private pilot
- Spouse: Gary Alan

Maria Entraigues (also known professionally as Maria Maria) is an Argentine-American singer, composer, and actress, and is cofounder of the Alliance for Longevity Science, Arts & Entertainment (ALSAE).

Entraigues previously served as Director of Development for the Lifespan Research Institute, having long held that role with the SENS Research Foundation before its merger into the Institute. With SENS, Entraigues had represented the Foundation internationally through appearances and presentations at conferences and in the media, and had explained and promoted the eradication of diseases and disabilities of aging through innovative biotechnologies.

Entraigues is also one of "The 300 Members of Methuselah Foundation", a group of people committed to help the advancement of technologies to eradicate the needless suffering of age-related disease and extend healthy human life. She is fluent in Spanish, English and Italian.

== Early life and career ==
Born in Buenos Aires, Entraigues became involved in the entertainment business when she was very young, acting on the popular TV show Supermingo with Juan Carlos Altavista. She toured as a singer with artist Alejandro Lerner, appearing on three albums with him. Later she sang with various artists, including Luis Miguel, Alejandro Sanz, Ricky Martin, Rubén Rada, Juan Carlos Baglietto, Nito Mestre, Ricardo Montaner, Shaila Dúrcal, Pepe Aguilar, Jean-Michel Byron, Cristian Castro, Colin Hay, and Eikichi Yazawa. She writes a monthly article about "The Voice and Singing" for Músico Pro, a Spanish music magazine from Music Maker Publications.

Entraigues moved to Boston in 1992 when she was awarded with a scholarship to study Voice Performance and Composition at the Berklee College of Music. She later established herself in Los Angeles, California, and became a United States citizen. From 2009 to 2012, she also served as cultural attaché to the Consulate General of Argentina in Los Angeles.

== Film career, music awards, and aviation ==
Entraigues engaged in singing and songwriting for movies including A Beautiful Life (2008), and for A Walk in the Clouds (1995), which was directed by Alfonso Arau, with whom she worked on six films after that. She also composed and performed music for Rush Hour 3 (2008), and for Disney movies, Disney radio campaigns and FOX Latin Television.

In 2005, Entraigues received an ASCAP award for co-writing the song "Luchare Por Tu Amor". This song was written as part of the soundtrack for the film, Zapata, starring Alejandro Fernández, for which the music was otherwise composed by Entraigues and Ruy Folguera. Her performance of the works of music of legendary singer Carlos Gardel was positively reviewed in Global Rhythm, in 2007, where a reviewer noted that "ten classic tracks are lovingly interpreted by singer Maria Entraigues", and wrote that Entraigues "has a sweet voice which seduces me every time I hear the album". Entraigues performed with the Cómplices Tour of Mexican singer Luis Miguel from 2008 to 2009. In 2010, she appeared in the Italian romantic comedy The Trick in the Sheet (original title: L'imbroglio Nel Lenzuolo), for which she also composed the music. In one scene, Entraigues sings Quando me'n vo' from Puccini's opera, La bohème. In May 2025, Entraigues performed for Argentinian President Javier Milei at a fashion event at Señor Tango in Buenos Aires, celebrating the 50-year career of designer Roberto Piazza, alongside other notable Argentine artists such as Raúl Lavié and Patricia Sosa.

Entraigues is also a pilot, and worked in that capacity on the set of the 2010 film, Jackass 3D. She began flying out of the Bob Hope Airport in Burbank, California, as a way to overcome a fear of flying. Her husband, Gary Alan, is also a private pilot.

== Longevity advocacy ==
In 2025, Entraigues was a cofounder of the Alliance for Longevity Science, Arts & Entertainment (ALSAE), with the aim of working with creative artists to improve representation of longevity in the arts. Entraigues previously served as the Director of Development for the SENS Research Foundation, and has also served as a board member of the International Longevity Alliance, and a member of the advisory board of the Lifeboat Foundation. In 2019, Aging Analytics named Entraigues one of the Top-50 Women Longevity Leaders. In 2022, she joined the Scientific Advisory Board of Afrolongevity, an organization aimed at addressing longevity issues in Africa.
