= The Trick in the Sheet =

- Film poster
- Directed by: Alfonso Arau
- Written by: Giovanna Cucinotta; Francesco Costa; Maria Grazia Cucinotta; Chiara Clini; Romina Nardozi
- Produced by: Luis Ángel Bellaba; Maria Grazia Cucinotta; Riccardo Neri; Giulio Violati
- Starring: Maria Grazia Cucinotta; Geraldine Chaplin; Anne Parillaud; Primo Reggiani
- Cinematography: Vittorio Storaro
- Edited by: Consuelo Catucci; Roberto Perpignani
- Music by: Maria Entraigues; Ruy Folguera
- Release date: 18 June 2010 (Italy)
- Running time: 100 minutes
- Countries: Italy; Spain
- Language: Italian

The Trick in the Sheet (Original title:L'imbroglio Nel Lenzuolo) is a 2010 Italian period romantic comedy film directed by Alfonso Arau. About the arrival of cinema in a small Italian town, it stars Maria Grazia Cucinotta, Geraldine Chaplin, Anne Parillaud and Primo Reggiani. It was released in Italy on 18 June 2010.

== Plot ==
In a small town in southern Italy in 1905, theatrical performances are accompanied by short silent film.

Federico (Reggiani), is fascinated by this new film technology and switches from a medical career to writing screenplays. He soon lands a gig as the director of a new short silent film. However, he is torn by the demands of those around him, his producer wants salacious storylines with nudity and his sister, who also owns the production company, craves something more edifying. Federico decides to recreate the Biblical story of the falsely accused Susanna, where she nakedly bathes and is leered at by two older men.

Federico becomes attracted to Beatrice, a visiting writer (Parillaud) but decides to use Marianna (Cucinotta), a peasant sorceress, as his Susanna. He uses footage of her bathing in the river for his film without her knowledge. When the film becomes a hit, she is mistaken for Susanna by nearly everyone in town which threatens to destroy her life.

== Cast ==
- Maria Grazia Cucinotta as Marianna
- Geraldine Chaplin as Alma
- Anne Parillaud as Beatrice
- Miguel Ángel Silvestre as Giocondo
- Angélica Aragón as Teresa
- Giselda Volodi as Elena
- Primo Reggiani as Federico
- Maria Entraigues as Opera singer
