= Fabrizio Costa =

Italian film and television director

Fabrizio Costa (born May 31, 1957, in Trieste) is an Italian film director.

Costa started his career as an assistant director to Pasquale Festa Campanile. In 1981, he made his directorial debut with, Venezia Danza Europa 81.

== Filmography ==
- Fatima (1997)
- Mother Teresa of Calcutta (2003)
- The Citadel (2003)
- Clare and Francis (2007)
- Paul VI: The Pope in the Tempest (2008)
- Don Matteo (2008), 9 episodes
- Donna Detective (2010)
- Uno di noi (2011)
- Inspector Nardone (2012)
- La vita che corre (2012)
- Rosso San Valentino (2013)
- La bella e la bestia (2014)
- Purché finisca bene (2014)
- Catturandi - Nel nome del padre (2016)
- Scomparsa (2017)
- Digitare il codice segreto (2021)
- Luce dei tuoi occhi (2021)
- Fosca Innocenti (2022)
