= Uno di noi (TV series) =

- Genre: Comedy-drama
- Directed by: Fabrizio Costa
- Starring: Gioele Dix; Lucrezia Lante della Rovere
- Country of origin: Italy
- No. of seasons: 1
- No. of episodes: 12

Original release
- Network: Rai 1
- Release: September 29 – December 22, 1996

Uno di noi (English: One of Us) is an Italian television series, airing on Rai Uno in 1996. The series was rerun on Rai Premium during the summer of 2011.

== Plot ==
Ercole Della Valle is a successful architect who designs golf courses. Following the death of his adoptive father, he leaves his job to take over the orphanage in which he spent the first twelve years of his life.

Here he finds his childhood best-friend Vito, who has never forgiven Ercole for being adopted while Vito never was. However, their friendship flourishes and together they run the orphanage, improving living conditions and giving renewed hope to children.

When Ercole and Vito fall in love with the same woman, their friendship is put to the test again. The young social worker Anna falls in love with Vito and becomes pregnant with his child. However, for some time Vito is unconvinced that Anna's feeling for him are genuine.

== Episodes ==
- 1. Il ritorno (The Return)
- 2. L'errore (The Mistake)
- 3 Una famiglia (One Family)
- 4. I due amori (The Two Loves)
- 5. Vero come una bugia ( As True As A Lie)
- 6. Il corridore (The Runner)
- 7. Il diritto alla felicità (The Right To Happiness))
- 8. Una madre indegna (An Unworthy Mother)
- 9. Bambino padre (The Child's Father)
- 10. Senza terra (Without a Home)
- 11. Per gioco (For Fun)
- 12. Sempre insieme (Forever Together)

== See also ==
- List of Italian television series
