= The Second Wedding Night =

- Directed by: Pupi Avati
- Starring: Antonio Albanese; Neri Marcorè; Katia Ricciarelli
- Cinematography: Pasquale Rachini
- Music by: Riz Ortolani
- Release date: 2005
- Country: Italy
- Language: Italian

La seconda notte di nozze (internationally released as The Second Wedding Night) is an Italian comedy-drama film directed by Pupi Avati. It entered the 2005 Venice Film Festival. For this film Katia Ricciarelli won Nastro d'Argento for Best Actress.

== Cast ==
- Antonio Albanese: Giordano Ricci
- Neri Marcorè: Nino Ricci
- Katia Ricciarelli: Lilliana Vespero
- Angela Luce: Suntina Ricci
- Marisa Merlini: Eugenia Ricci
- Toni Santagata: Ugo Di Dante
