= Chiara Mastalli =

Italian actress

- Born: 2 August 1984 (age 41); Rome, Italy
- Occupation: Actress

Chiara Mastalli (born 2 August 1984 in Rome) is an Italian film and television actress.

She gained recognition for her role as Eirene in the HBO/BBC/RAI original television series Rome.

== Biography ==
Born in Rome in 1984, in 2001 she shoots the short film Ten Minutes Older – The Cello, while in 2003 she appears on the big screen with a small part in the film Remember Me, My Love and in the role of Nina in Men & women, love & lies.

== Career ==
In 2008 she returned to the cinema screens with the film Love, Soccer and Other Catastrophes, directed by Luca Lucini, and on the small screen with Un caso di coscienza. She is also the protagonist, together with Lorenzo Balducci, of the TV movie Così vanno le cose. In 2009 she appeared again with the miniseries L'isola dei segreti – Korè and I liceali 2. In 2010 she graduated in Marketing & Advertising at LUMSA, winning a scholarship.

== Filmography ==
=== Cinema ===
- Ten Minutes Older: The Cello (2001)
- Tre metri sopra il cielo (2003)
- Uomini Donne Bambini e Cani (2003)
- Notte prima degli esami (2005)
- Notte prima degli esami – Oggi (2007)
- Un fantastico via vai (2013)

=== Television ===
- Sei forte maestro (2000)
- Carabinieri (2002)
- Casa famiglia (2002)
- Padri e Figli (2003)
- Il Maresciallo Rocca 5 (2005)
- Simuladores (2005)
- Rome (2005)
- L'amore spezzato (2005)
- Codice rosso (2005)
- I Liceali 2 (2009)
- L'Allieva (2016–2020)
