= Our Land (2006 film) =

- Theatrical release poster
- Directed by: Sergio Rubini
- Written by: Sergio Rubini; Angelo Pasquini
- Starring: Fabrizio Bentivoglio; Emilio Solfrizzi; Sergio Rubini
- Cinematography: Fabio Cianchetti
- Edited by: Giogiò Franchini
- Music by: Pino Donaggio
- Production company: Fandango
- Distributed by: Medusa Film
- Release date: 2006
- Running time: 112 minutes
- Country: Italy
- Language: Italian

Our Land (Italian: La terra, also known as The Earth) is a 2006 Italian comedy-drama film written and directed by Sergio Rubini. The film was nominated for seven David di Donatello awards (including best film and best director), and for three Nastro d'Argento awards.

== Plot ==
Luigi Di Santo is a respectable teacher in Milan, where he lives his family, with a bad past in Apulia. One day he is called to Mesagne to deal with family problems. One of his three brothers does not want to surrender his farm in the country to a local developer who wants to build a large out-of-town shopping mall on the land. Another of the brothers, Michele, is desperate for his brother to sell the farm, because he has big debts and does not want to compromise his political career. Finally, the third and youngest of the brothers, Aldo, manages a retreat for disabled people in the country, and looks absolutely harmless. On the night of the Good Friday procession, the developer is shot dead in the town square, and people believe the killer is Mario, the owner of the farm, to take revenge. But it is not so, and soon Luigi finds a terrible secret in his family.

== Cast ==
- Fabrizio Bentivoglio as Luigi Di Santo
- Sergio Rubini as Tonino
- Emilio Solfrizzi as Michele Di Santo
- Paolo Briguglia as Mario Di Santo
- Claudia Gerini as Laura
- Massimo Venturiello as Aldo Di Santo
