= Carolina Benvenga =

Italian actress and television presenter

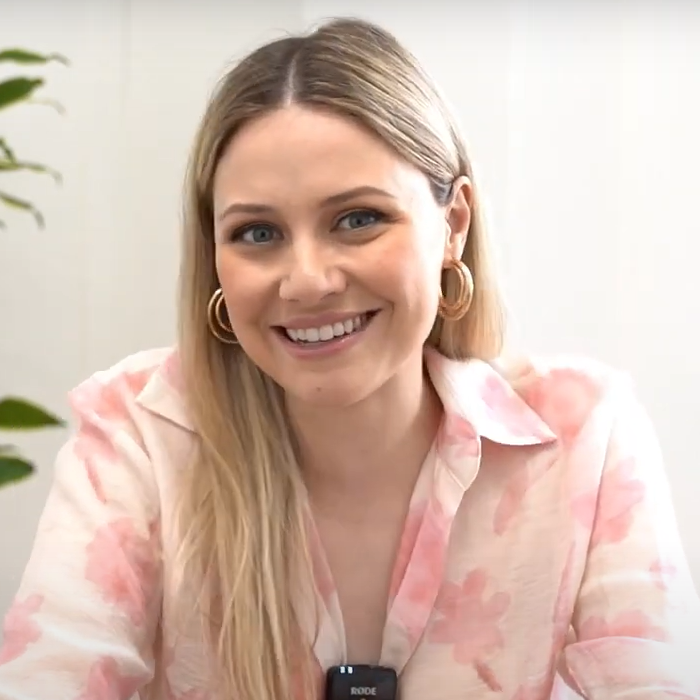
- Benvenga in 2024
- Born: Carolina Victoria Benvenga; 10 January 1990 (age 36); Rome, Italy
- Occupations: Television presenter; actress; singer

Carolina Victoria Benvenga (born 10 January 1990) is an Italian actress and television presenter.

== Career ==
Her prominent work to date has included a lead role in the television series I liceali, as the daughter of the show's main character. In 2009 she is co-host, together with Andrea Dianetti, of the program Staraoke, broadcast on the Cartoon Network channel and in 2010 on Boing. In May 2010 she returned to the big screen with the romantic comedy film Una canzone per te, first work by director Herbert Simone Paragnani, in which she plays the role of Irene, a wealthy girl in eternal competition with the protagonist of the film, played by Emanuele Bosi. As of late 2012, Benvenga was hosting two national Italian television programs: La posta di Yoyo on Rai Yoyo, and Tiggì Gulp on Rai Gulp.

== Filmography ==
=== Films ===
Year	Title	Role	Notes
2005	Tickets	Girl	Uncredited cameo
2010	Una canzone per te	Irene	
2016	Peppa Pig in giro per il mondo	Herself	Short film

=== Television ===
Year	Title	Role	Notes
2006	La luna e il lago	Rosanna	Television film
2007	Io e mamma	Betta	Main role; 6 episodes
2007	Nebbie e delitti	Martina	Episode: "Vietato ai minori"
2008	Zodiaco	Barbara Santandrea	Miniseries
2008–2009	I liceali	Elena Cicerino	Main role (seasons 1–2); 10 episodes
2011	Anna e i cinque	Carolina	Main role; 6 episodes
2012–present	La posta di Yo-yo	Herself / Presenter	Children's program
2012	TiggìGulp	Herself / Presenter	Children's program
2015, 2016	Natale con Yo-yo	Herself / Presenter	Specials
2016	Gulp Girl	Herself / Presenter	Children's program
2020	Il coronavirus spiegato ai bambini	Herself / Presenter	Special
