= Notte prima degli esami =

- Original movie poster
- Directed by: Fausto Brizzi
- Written by: Fausto Brizzi; Massimiliano Bruno; Marco Martani; Giannandrea Pecorelli
- Produced by: Federica Lucisano; Fulvio Lucisano; Giannandrea Pecorelli
- Starring: Giorgio Faletti; Cristiana Capotondi; Nicolas Vaporidis; Sarah Maestri; Chiara Mastalli; Andrea De Rosa; Eros Galbiati; Elena Bouryka; Valeria Fabrizi
- Cinematography: Marcello Montarsi
- Edited by: Luciana Pandolfelli
- Music by: Bruno Zambrini
- Distributed by: 01 Distribuzione
- Release date: 17 February 2006
- Running time: 100 minutes
- Country: Italy
- Language: Italian

Notte prima degli esami (English: Night Before the Exams) is a 2006 Italian comedy teen film, written and directed by Fausto Brizzi. It describes the lives of two groups of Italian teenagers during the preparation of the esame di maturità (the final exam of Italian high school). It is set in Rome during the year 1989.

The inspiration for the title was a famous 1980s song by Antonello Venditti.

== Plot ==
The film follows two teenagers, Luca (Nicolas Vaporidis) and Claudia (Cristiana Capotondi), and their friends as they all prepare for the dreaded maturità (high school graduation) exams during the summer of 1989. At a party, Luca meets and immediately falls for Claudia. The film then follows both teenagers and their friends through their various personal experiences and adventures during the summer. In addition, throughout the film, Luca is desperately trying to get back in favour with his literature teacher (Giorgio Faletti), who will be the teacher sitting in on his oral exams.

The film contains many references to music that was popular in the 1980s, and includes songs of the time period by bands such as Europe, Duran Duran ("Save a Prayer" and "The Wild Boys"), and Cecchetto ("Gioca Jouer").

== Cast ==
- Nicolas Vaporidis as Luca
- Cristiana Capotondi as Claudia
- Giorgio Faletti as professor Antonio Martinelli
- Eros Galbiati as Riccardo
- Sarah Maestri as Alice
- Andrea De Rosa as Massi
- Chiara Mastalli as Simona
- Elena Bouryka as Valentina
- Valeria Fabrizi as grandma Adele

== Sequels and remakes ==
A sequel, Notte prima degli esami – Oggi was released in 2007. The sequel features many of the same actors playing the same characters they played in the original, but it is set in 2006, during Italy's World Cup winning summer. And in 2011, Italian television station Rai Uno aired Notte prima degli esami '82, a two-part miniseries involving many of the same characters as the first two movies, but using mostly different actors and setting the story in the summer of 1982.

A French remake of the original movie, titled Nos 18 ans, was released in 2008.
