= Roberto Piazza (designer) =

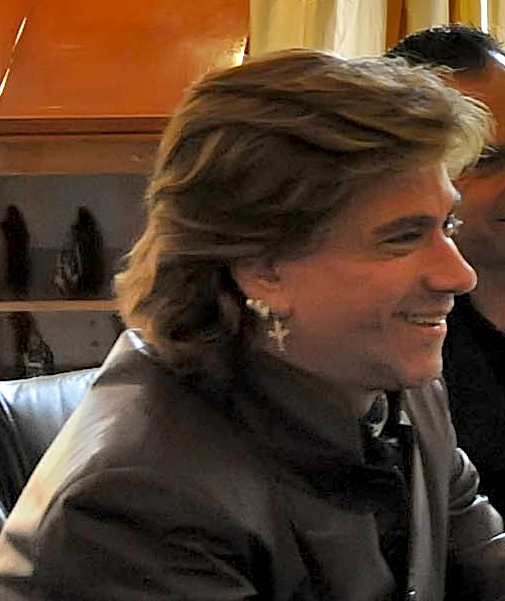
- Roberto Piazza in 2011.
- Born: Victorio Mario Roberto Piazza Foradini Pezzone; May 16, 1959 (age 66); Santa Fe, Argentina
- Occupations: Fashion designer, actor, singer, writer
- Spouse: Walter Vázquez (m. 2010)
- Relatives: Raúl Pezzone Piazza; Ricardo Pezzone Piazza; Carlos Pezzone Piazza
- Website: robertopiazza.com.ar

Roberto Piazza (born Victorio Mario Roberto Piazza Foradini Pezzone; May 16, 1959) is an Argentine actor, singer, writer, and fashion designer of Italian descent.

== Biography ==
=== Early life ===
Born into a modest family, Roberto Piazza grew up with his father, mother (who died in 1987), grandmother, and four brothers. His childhood was challenging. He has openly shared that he suffered repeated sexual abuse by his brother Ricardo from the age of five until he was seventeen, a situation his parents were aware of. At the age of eighteen, Piazza left his family home due to death threats from his father. As of 2015, he was still undergoing psychiatric treatment to cope with this trauma.

=== Career ===
In 2008, Piazza authored an Argentine bestseller titled Corte y Confesión, in which he detailed the sexual abuse he endured in his youth. He also serves as president of a foundation dedicated to combating child abuse.

As a fashion designer, Piazza is known for vivid and colorful creations with floral motifs, featuring ample and revealing cuts. He frequently incorporates bright fabrics and animal prints into his designs.

Piazza experienced homophobia during a televised debate when questioned by Mirtha Legrand. During a conversation about LGBT parenting, she asked him if he might sexually abuse a child he planned to adopt. Shocked, Piazza later received a public apology on television.

On the morning of September 10, 2009, Piazza was attacked at his home, which also serves as his design workshop, by an assailant who tied him up and sexually molested him. Piazza convinced the attacker not to rape him. The assailant stole valuable jewelry, watches, and about 15,000 Argentine pesos. When police arrived, the attacker was still inside the residence and was arrested immediately after being discovered by Piazza's assistant, Mario Piazza. Piazza, in shock, required psychological assistance and was taken to Pirovano Hospital for medical evaluation.

In May 2025, a fashion event celebrating Piazza's 50-year career was held at Señor Tango in Buenos Aires, attended by Argentinian President Javier Milei, and featuring Argentine artists including Maria Entraigues, Raúl Lavié, and Patricia Sosa.

== Bibliography ==
- 2008: Corte y confesión, Editorial Planeta.

== Personal life ==
Roberto Piazza is openly gay. On September 16, 2010, he married his partner, choreographer Walter Vázquez.
