= R.I.S. Roma – Delitti imperfetti =

Italian television series

- Genre: Police procedural
- Created by: Pietro Valsecchi
- Starring: Euridice Axen; Fabio Troiano; Maria Palma Petruolo; Jun Ichikawa; Primo Reggiani; Marco Rossetti; Simone Gandolfo; Lucia Rossi
- Country of origin: Italy
- Original language: Italian
- No. of seasons: 3
- No. of episodes: 60

Production
- Running time: 50 min

Original release
- Release: March 18, 2010 – November 28, 2012

Related
- RIS Delitti Imperfetti

R.I.S. Roma – Delitti imperfetti is an Italian television series. It's a spin-off of RIS Delitti Imperfetti. The show aired March 18 2010 to Novembre 27, 2012 on Canale 5.

== Characters ==
- Lucia Brancato (2010-2012)
- Daniele Ghirelli (2010-2012)
- Emiliano Cecchi (2010-2012)
- Flavia Ayroldi (2010-2011)
- Constanza Moro (2010)
- Bartolomeo Dossena (2010-2012)
- Guido Brancato (2010)
- Orlando Serra (2011-2012)
- Bianca Proietti (2011-2012)
- Ernesto Rambaudi (2010-2012)

Actor	Character	Position	Seasons		
Actor	Character	Position	1	2	3
Euridice Axen	Lucia Brancato	Captain/RIS Supervisor	Main	Main	Main
Fabio Troiano	Daniele Ghirelli	Captain/RIS Forensic	Main	Main	Main
Primo Reggani	Emiliano Cecchi	RIS Forensic	Main	Main	Main
Jun Ichykawa	Flavia Ayrlodi	Lieutenant/RIS Forensic	Main	Guest	
Simone Gandlofo	Orlando Serra	Lieutenant/RIS Forensic		Main	Main
Mary Petruollo	Constnza Moro	Sublieutenant/RIS Forensic	Main		
Lucia Rossi	Bianca Proietti	Sublieutenant/RIS Forensic		Main	Main
Marco Rosetti	Bartolomeo Dossena	RIS Forensic	Main	Main	Main
Claudio Castargovanni	Guido Brancato	Police Captain	Main		
Perluigi Corallo	Ernesto Rambaudi	Police Captain	Recurring	Main	Main

== Production ==
The series start from the idea of Pietro Valsecchi and developed by Massimo Martella and Mauro Casiraghi like a story editors. The directors of the series are Fabio Tagliavia (season 1) and Francesco Miccichè (seasons 2&3)

== See also ==
- List of Italian television series
