= Orgoglio (TV series) =

- Genre: Period drama; Romantic drama
- Created by: Marco Tocchi
- Starring: Elena Sofia Ricci; Daniele Pecci; Franco Castellano; Cristiana Capotondi; Paolo Ferrari; Imma Piro; Gianna Paola Scaffidi; Gabriella Pession; Lucrezia Lante della Rovere; Claudia Ruffo; Giancarlo Previati; Giusy Cataldo; Luigi Saravo; Maria Palma Petruolo; Nicola Di Pinto; Primo Reggiani; Vincenzo Bocciarelli; Marco Vivio; Dario De Vito; Caterina Murino; Simona Caparrini; Barbara D'Urso; Enzo Decaro; Helene Nardini; Fabio Fulco; Samuela Sardo; Elena Russo
- Country of origin: Italy
- No. of seasons: 3
- No. of episodes: 39

Production
- Running time: 100 minutes

Original release
- Network: Rai 1
- Release: February 29, 2004 – March 6, 2006

Orgoglio (Pride) is an Italian television series which ran from 2004 to 2006.

== See also ==
- List of Italian television series
