= Giorgio Faletti =

Italian writer (1950–2014)

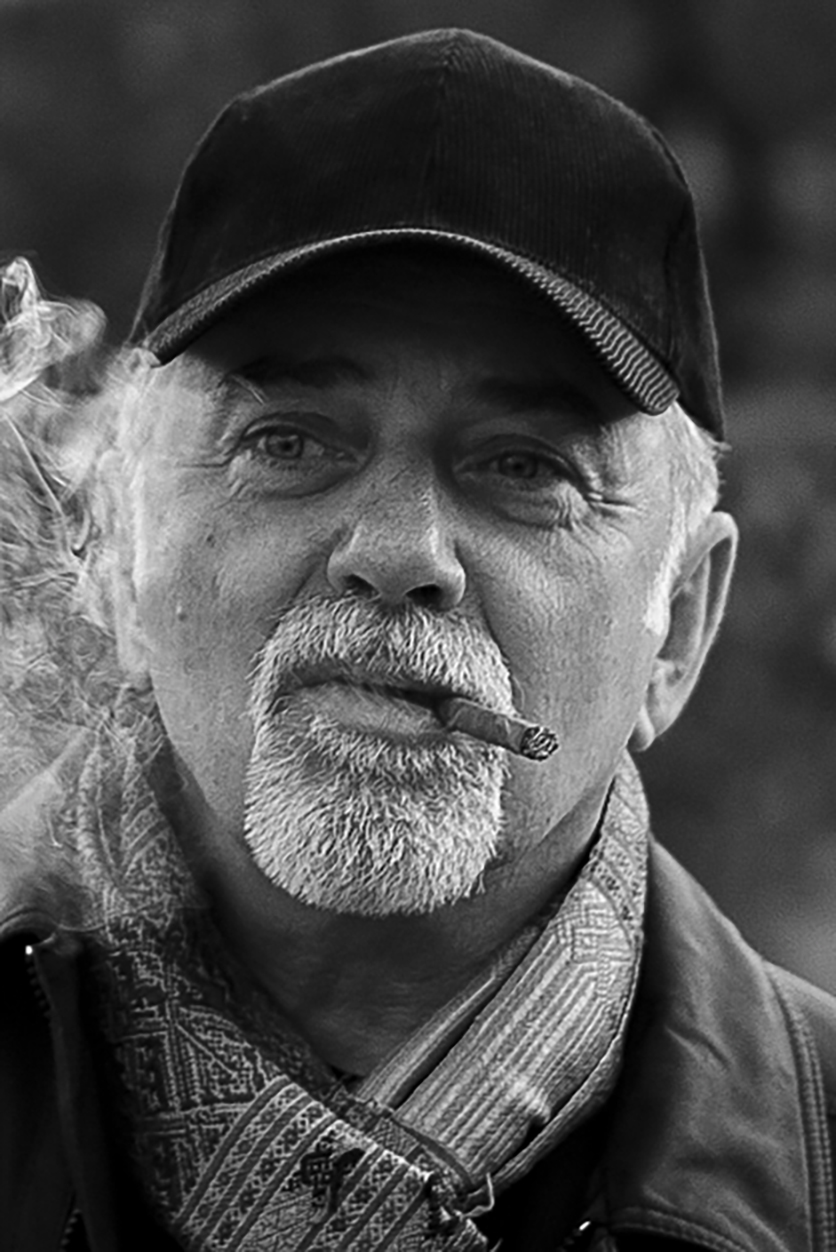
- Faletti at Premio Chiara in 2009
- Born: 25 November 1950; Asti, Italy
- Died: 4 July 2014 (aged 63); Turin, Italy
- Occupations: Writer, actor, comedian, singer
- Writing career
- Genre: Thriller
- Website: giorgiofaletti.it

Giorgio Faletti (Italian pronunciation: [ˈdʒordʒo faˈletti]; 25 November 1950 – 4 July 2014) was an Italian writer, musician, actor and comedian. Born in Asti, Piedmont, he lived on Elba Island. His books have been translated into 25 languages and published with great success in Europe, South America, China, Japan, Russia and the United States.

== Biography ==
"In life there are things that you look for and others that come looking for you".
(Original: "Nella vita ci sono cose che ti cerchi e altre che ti vengono a cercare".)

=== Comedian ===
After graduating from law school, Faletti began his career as a comedian during the 1970s at the Milanese Club "Derby". During the same period he shared the stage with the local circle of actors: Diego Abatantuono, Teo Teocoli, Massimo Boldi, Paolo Rossi and Francesco Salvi. In 1983, he appeared on Antenna 3 Lombardia and alongside Raffaella Carrà in Pronto Raffaella. In 1985, he was cast as a comedian in Antonio Ricci's successful variety show Drive In. Other television successes followed, on variety shows such as Emilio, Fantastico and Stasera mi butto... e tre!.

=== Music ===
Approaching the world of music in the meantime, in 1988, he released the mini-album Colletti bianchi, the soundtrack of the TV series of the same name in which he was one of the main actors. In 1991 he released his second album, Disperato ma non serio, launched by the single Ulula, and he composed the song "Traditore", included in Mina's album Caterpillar. In 1992, he participated, for the first time, at the Sanremo Music Festival in tandem with Orietta Berti with the song "Rumba di Tango".

In 1994, Faletti got his main success as a singer-songwriter with the song "Signor Tenente", inspired by massacres of Capaci and Via D'Amelio, ranking second at the Sanremo Music Festival and also winning the Critics' Award. The subsequent album, Come un cartone animato, was a platinum album.

In 1995, at the Sanremo Festival, he sang "L'assurdo mestiere", a sort of prayer-thanks to the Lord, revealing a melancholic and reflective side. In the same festival, as part-author of the song sung by Gigliola Cinquetti, "Giovane vecchio cuore".

He has also written songs for Fiordaliso, as well as two songs from the album Camminando, Camminando (1996), and the whole album Il dito e la luna (1998), both by Angelo Branduardi. In 2000, he released Nonsense, his sixth and last album. In 2007, Faletti was back at the Sanremo Festival, as the author of the song "The Show Must Go On", sung by Milva, ranked tenth position. The song was part of the album Territorio nemico, entirely written (lyrics and music) by Faletti. In 2009, he composed the song "Gli anni che non hai", included in Marco Masini's album L'Italia... e altre storie.

=== Writer ===
Faletti was a motor-racing enthusiast. In the early 1990s he regularly wrote a column about Rally and Formula One for the Italian weekly magazine Autosprint.

Faletti's debut as an author was the 1994 humorous book Porco il mondo che ciò sotto i piedi!, published by Baldini & Castoldi, which recounts the exploits of his most famous character, Vito Catozzo, whom he had launched in Drive In.

In 2002, Faletti surprised critics and audiences with his first thriller novel, I Kill (Io uccido), which sold more than four million copies.

At the end of 2002, he suffered a minor stroke. In 2004, his second novel, The Killer In My Eyes (Niente di vero tranne gli occhi), sold three million and a half copies.

Jeffery Deaver said of Faletti: "In my neck of the woods, people like Faletti are called larger than life, living legends." In November 2005, Giorgio Faletti received from the President of the Italian Republic the De Sica Prize for Literature.

In 2006, Faletti released his novel "Outside of an Evident Destiny" Fuori da un evidente destino; the same year he starred in the film Notte prima degli esami being nominated for the David di Donatello Award for best supporting actor. He also appeared in the sequel, Notte prima degli esami – Oggi (2007). Also in 2007, he played the villain in Concrete Romance.

In 2008, Faletti published his first collection of short stories, entitled A few useless hiding places Pochi inutili nascondigli, followed by the novels I Am God (Io sono Dio, 2009), Appunti di un venditore di donne (2010), and Tre atti e due tempi (2011).

His commitment and his achievements in the field of literature led him to be appointed president of the Astense Library in September 2012.

He was a supporter of Juventus FC.

== Death ==
Faletti died of lung cancer on 4 July 2014, aged 63.

He received the America Award in memory, from the Italy-USA Foundation in 2019.
