= List of Italian films of 2004 =

A list of films produced in Italy in 2004 (see 2004 in film):

Title	Director	Cast	Genre	Notes
2004
13 at a Table	Enrico Oldoini	Giancarlo Giannini, Nicolas Vaporidis, Kasia Smutniak	Comedy	
After Midnight	Davide Ferrario	Francesca Inaudi, Giorgio Pasotti	Love, Filmgoer	
Agata and the Storm	Silvio Soldini	Licia Maglietta, Giuseppe Battiston, Emilio Solfrizzi	comedy	
The Card Player	Dario Argento	Stefania Rocca, Liam Cunningham, Silvio Muccino	giallo	
Christmas in Love	Neri Parenti	Christian De Sica, Danny DeVito, Massimo Boldi	comedy	
Christmas Rematch	Pupi Avati	Diego Abatantuono, Gianni Cavina, Carlo Delle Piane	comedy-drama	sequel of Christmas Present
City Limits	Andrea Costantini	Edoardo Leo, Elisabetta Cavallotti	crime	
A Children's Story (Certi bambini)	Giorgio Pasotti, Andrea and Antonio Frazzi	Gianluca Di Gennaro, Carmine Recano	Drama	
The Consequences of Love (Le conseguenze dell'amore)	Paolo Sorrentino	Toni Servillo, Olivia Magnani, Adriano Giannini, Raffaele Pisu	Mafia drama	5 David di Donatello, 3 Nastro d'Argento, entered at Cannes
Don't Move (Non ti muovere)	Sergio Castellitto	Sergio Castellitto, Penélope Cruz, Claudia Gerini, Angela Finocchiaro	Drama	2 David di Donatello
Eros	Michelangelo Antonioni, Steven Soderbergh, Wong Kar-Wai	Gong Li, Robert Downey Jr., Christopher Buchholz	Drama	anthology film
Evilenko	David Grieco	Malcolm McDowell, Marton Csokas, Ronald Pickup	crime horror thriller	
First Love (Primo Amore)	Matteo Garrone	Vitaliano Trevisan, Michela Cescon	Drama	
Guardians of the Clouds	Luciano Odorisio	Alessandro Gassmann, Franco Nero, Anna Galiena, Claudia Gerini	drama	
I Like to Work (Mobbing)	Francesca Comencini	Nicoletta Braschi, Camille Dugay Comencini	drama	4 Awards
An Italian Romance	Carlo Mazzacurati	Stefano Accorsi, Maya Sansa	drama	
The Jokes	Carlo Vanzina	Gigi Proietti, Enzo Salvi, Carlo Buccirosso	comedy	
The Keys to the House (Le chiavi di casa)	Gianni Amelio	Kim Rossi Stuart, Charlotte Rampling, Andrea Rossi	Drama	3 Nastro d'Argento. Venice Awards
Lavorare con lentezza	Guido Chiesa	Claudia Pandolfi, Valerio Mastandrea	drama	Entered into the 61st Venice International Film Festival
The Life That I Want	Giuseppe Piccioni	Luigi Lo Cascio, Sandra Ceccarelli, Galatea Ranzi	drama	Entered into the 27th Moscow International Film Festival
Love Is Eternal While It Lasts	Carlo Verdone	Carlo Verdone, Laura Morante, Stefania Rocca	romantic comedy	
Love Returns	Sergio Rubini	Fabrizio Bentivoglio, Margherita Buy, Giovanna Mezzogiorno, Sergio Rubini	comedy-drama	
Luisa Sanfelice	Paolo and Vittorio Taviani	Laetitia Casta, Adriano Giannini, Cecilia Roth	historical drama	
Miracle in Palermo!	Beppe Cino	Maria Grazia Cucinotta, Vincent Schiavelli	comedy-drama	
Ovunque sei	Michele Placido	Stefano Accorsi, Violante Placido, Barbora Bobuľová, Stefano Dionisi	romance-drama	Entered into the 61st Venice International Film Festival
Pontormo – un amore eretico	Giovanni Fago	Joe Mantegna, Galatea Ranzi, Laurent Terzieff	historical drama	
Private	Saverio Costanzo	Mohammad Bakri	Drama	Israeli-Palestinian conflict
The Remains Of Nothing	Antonietta De Lillo	Maria de Medeiros	historical drama	
Roundtrip	Marco Ponti	Libero De Rienzo, Vanessa Incontrada	comedy	
Saint John Bosco: Mission to Love	Lodovico Gasparini	Flavio Insinna, Lina Sastri, Charles Dance	historical drama	
Saint Rita	Giorgio Capitani	Vittoria Belvedere, Martin Crewes	historical drama	
The Scent of Blood	Mario Martone	Fanny Ardant, Michele Placido	thriller-drama	
The Spectator	Paolo Franchi	Barbora Bobuľová	Drama	
Stay with Me	Livia Giampalmo	Giovanna Mezzogiorno, Adriano Giannini	romance-drama	
Strange Crime	Roberto Andò	Daniel Auteuil, Anna Mouglalis, Greta Scacchi	mystery-drama	
Too Much Romance... It's Time for Stuffed Peppers	Lina Wertmüller	Sophia Loren, F. Murray Abraham	comedy-drama	
To Sleep Next To Her	Eugenio Cappuccio	Giorgio Pasotti, Cristiana Capotondi	drama	
Vanilla and Chocolate	Ciro Ippolito	Maria Grazia Cucinotta, Joaquín Cortés, Alessandro Preziosi	romance	
The Vanity Serum	Alex Infascelli	Margherita Buy, Francesca Neri, Valerio Mastandrea, Barbora Bobuľová	giallo	
Vento di terra	Vincenzo Marra	Vincenzo Pacilli, Giovanna Ribera	Drama	Close to Italian neorealism. Venice Awards
Virginia, la monaca di Monza	Alberto Sironi	Giovanna Mezzogiorno, Stefano Dionisi	historical drama	
The Voyage Home	Claudio Bondì	Elia Schilton	historical drama	
What Will Happen to Us	Giovanni Veronesi	Silvio Muccino, Violante Placido, Elio Germano, Valeria Solarino	romantic comedy	
The Wind, in the Evening	Andrea Adriatico	Corso Salani, Ivano Marescotti	drama	

== See also ==
- 2004 in Italian television
