= 48th David di Donatello =

2003 Italian film awards

- Date: 9 April 2003
- Site: Auditorium Parco della Musica, Rome
- Hosted by: Lorella Cuccarini; Massimo Ghini

Highlights
- Best Picture: Facing Windows
- Most awards: Facing Windows (5)
- Most nominations: Facing Windows (11)

Television coverage
- Network: Rai 2

The 48th David di Donatello ceremony, presented by the Accademia del Cinema Italiano, was held on 9 April 2003.

== Winners and nominees ==
Best Film: Facing Windows, directed by Ferzan Özpetek; Remember Me, My Love, directed by Gabriele Muccino; The Embalmer, directed by Matteo Garrone; My Mother's Smile, directed by Marco Bellocchio; Respiro, directed by Emanuele Crialese	Best Producer: Domenico Procacci – Respiro; Domenico Procacci – Remember Me, My Love; Elda Ferri – The Soul Keeper; Domenico Procacci – The Embalmer; Gianni Romoli, Tilde Corsi – Facing Windows
Best Director: Pupi Avati – Incantato; Gabriele Muccino – Remember Me, My Love; Marco Bellocchio – My Mother's Smile; Matteo Garrone – The Embalmer; Ferzan Özpetek – Facing Windows	Best New Director: Daniele Vicari – Maximum Velocity (V-Max); Francesco Falaschi – I Am Emma; Michele Mellara, Alessandro Rossi – Fortezza Bastiani; Marco Simon Puccioni – Quello che cerchi; Spiro Scimone, Francesco Sframeli – Two Friends
Best Actor: Massimo Girotti – Facing Windows; Roberto Benigni – Pinocchio; Fabrizio Bentivoglio – Remember Me, My Love; Sergio Castellitto – My Mother's Smile; Neri Marcorè – Incantato; Fabio Volo – Casomai	Best Actress: Giovanna Mezzogiorno – Facing Windows; Donatella Finocchiaro – Angela; Valeria Golino – Respiro; Laura Morante – Remember Me, My Love; Stefania Rocca – Casomai
Best Supporting Actor: Ernesto Mahieux – The Embalmer; Antonio Catania – It Can't Be All Our Fault; Pierfrancesco Favino – El Alamein: The Line of Fire; Giancarlo Giannini – Incantato; Kim Rossi Stuart – Pinocchio	Best Supporting Actress: Piera Degli Esposti – My Mother's Smile; Monica Bellucci – Remember Me, My Love; Nicoletta Romanoff – Remember Me, My Love; Francesca Neri – Happiness Costs Nothing; Serra Yılmaz – Facing Windows
David di Donatello for Best Screenplay: Matteo Garrone, Massimo Gaudioso, Ugo Chiti – The Embalmer; Gabriele Muccino, Heidrun Schleef – Remember Me, My Love; Anna Pavignano, Alessandro D'Alatri – Casomai; Gianni Romoli, Ferzan Özpetek – Facing Windows; Piero De Bernardi, Pasquale Plastino, Fiamma Satta, Carlo Verdone – It Can't Be All Our Fault; Marco Bellocchio – My Mother's Smile	Best Cinematography: Daniele Nannuzzi – El Alamein: The Line of Fire; Maurizio Calvesi – The Soul Keeper; Gianfilippo Corticelli – Facing Windows; Marco Onorato – The Embalmer; Dante Spinotti – Pinocchio; Fabio Zamarion – Respiro
Best Production Design: Danilo Donati – Pinocchio; Paolo Bonfini – The Embalmer; Giantito Burchiellaro – The Soul Keeper; Marco Dentici – My Mother's Smile; Simona Migliotti – Incantato	Best Score: Andrea Guerra – Facing Windows; Banda Osiris – The Embalmer; Pivio and Aldo De Scalzi – Casomai; Riz Ortolani – Incantato; Nicola Piovani – Pinocchio
Best Editing: Cecilia Zanuso – El Alamein: The Line of Fire; Claudio Di Mauro – Remember Me, My Love; Patrizio Marone – Facing Windows; Amedeo Salfa – Incantato; Marco Spoletini – The Embalmer	Best Sound: Andrea Giorgio Moser – El Alamein: The Line of Fire; Maurizio Argentieri – Casomai; Gaetano Carito – Remember Me, My Love; Gaetano Carito – Maximum Velocity (V-Max); Marco Grillo – Facing Windows
Best Costumes: Danilo Donati – Pinocchio; Mario Carlini, Francesco Crivellini – Incantato; Elena Mannini – A Journey Called Love; Francesca Sartori – The Soul Keeper; Andrea Viotti – El Alamein: The Line of Fire	Best Short Film: Racconto di guerra, directed by Mario Amura (ex aequo); Rosso fango, directed by Paolo Ameli (ex aequo); Radioportogutenberg, directed by Alessandro Vannucci; Regalo di Natale, directed by Daniele De Plano; Space off, directed by Tino Franco
Best Foreign Film: The Pianist, directed by Roman Polański; Chicago, directed by Rob Marshall; Talk to Her, directed by Pedro Almodóvar; The Hours, directed by Stephen Daldry; The Man on the Train, directed by Patrice Leconte	David Scuola: Facing Windows, directed by Ferzan Özpetek; Special David Awards: Gregory Peck; Isabelle Huppert
