= 44th David di Donatello =

1999 Italian film awards

- Date: 16 June 1999
- Site: Cinecittà, Rome
- Hosted by: Carlo Conti

Highlights
- Best Picture: Not of this World
- Most awards: The Legend of 1900 (6)
- Most nominations: Not of this World (9)

Television coverage
- Network: Rai 1

The 44th David di Donatello ceremony, presented by the Accademia del Cinema Italiano, was held on 16 June 1999.

== Winners and nominees ==
Best Film: Not of this World, directed by Giuseppe Piccioni; The Legend of 1900, directed by Giuseppe Tornatore; Besieged, directed by Bernardo Bertolucci	Best Producer: Lionello Cerri – Not of this World; Franco Committeri – The Dinner; Domenico Procacci – Radiofreccia
Best Director: Giuseppe Tornatore – The Legend of 1900; Bernardo Bertolucci – Besieged; Giuseppe Piccioni – Not of this World	Best New Director: Luciano Ligabue – Radiofreccia; Giuseppe M. Gaudino – Moonspins Between Land and Sea; Gabriele Muccino – Ecco fatto
Best Actor: Stefano Accorsi – Radiofreccia; Antonio Albanese – La fame e la sete; Silvio Orlando – Not of this World	Best Actress: Margherita Buy – Not of this World; Francesca Neri – Marriages; Giovanna Mezzogiorno – Of Lost Love
Best Supporting Actor: Fabrizio Bentivoglio – Of Lost Love; Mario Scaccia – Ferdinando and Carolina; Emilio Solfrizzi – Marriages	Best Supporting Actress: Cecilia Dazzi – Marriages; Paola Tiziana Cruciani – Kisses and Hugs; Lunetta Savino – Marriages
David di Donatello for Best Screenplay: Giuseppe Piccioni, Gualtiero Rosella, Lucia Zei – Not of this World; Cristina Comencini – Marriages; Giuseppe Tornatore – The Legend of 1900	Best Cinematography: Lajos Koltai – The Legend of 1900; Luca Bigazzi – The Way We Laughed; Fabio Cianchetti – Besieged
Best Production Design: Francesco Frigeri – The Legend of 1900; Giancarlo Basili – The Way We Laughed; Enrico Job – Ferdinando and Carolina	Best Score: Ennio Morricone – The Legend of 1900; Ludovico Einaudi – Not of this World; Luciano Ligabue – Radiofreccia
Best Editing: Esmeralda Calabria – Not of this World; Massimo Quaglia – The Legend of 1900; Cecilia Zanuso – Marriages	Best Sound: Gaetano Carito – Radiofreccia; Amedeo Casati – Not of this World; Bruno Pupparo – Marriages
Best Costumes: Maurizio Millenotti – The Legend of 1900; Gianna Gissi – The Way We Laughed; Gino Persico – Ferdinando and Carolina	Best Short Film: Quasi fratelli, directed by Francesco Falaschi; Fuochino,directed by Carlotta Cerquetti; Incantesimo napoletano, directed by Paolo Genovese and Luca Miniero; Tanti auguri, directed by Giulio Manfredonia
Best Foreign Film: Train of Life, directed by Radu Mihăileanu; Shakespeare in Love, directed by John Madden; Central Station, directed by Walter Salles	David Scuola: The Legend of 1900, directed by Giuseppe Tornatore; Little Teachers, directed by Daniele Luchetti; Of Lost Love, directed by Michele Placido
Cinecittà Prize: Dante Ferretti	Special David Awards: Mauro Bolognini; Sophia Loren; Alberto Sordi
