= Mariolina De Fano =

Italian actress (1940–2020)

- Born: 14 October 1940; Bari, Apulia, Kingdom of Italy
- Died: 18 August 2020 (aged 79); Bari, Apulia, Italy
- Occupation: Actress

Mariolina De Fano (14 October 1940 – 18 August 2020) was an Italian actress.

== Partial filmography ==
- Il carabiniere (1981) - Maid
- Vigili e vigilesse (1982) - Assunta
- Pover'ammore (1982)
- L'ammiratrice (1983) - Caterina
- Where Are You? I'm Here (1993)
- Prestazione straordinaria (1994)
- The Graduates (1995)
- Dove sei perduto amore (1997)
- Fireworks (1997) - Barbara Passanisi's Aunt
- The Bride's Journey (1997)
- Un bugiardo in paradiso (1998)
- E insieme vivremo tutte le stagioni (1999)
- La bomba (1999)
- Tutto l'amore che c'è (2000) - Zia Rosa
- Si fa presto a dire amore... (2000) - Madre Silvana
- E adesso sesso (2001)
- Soul Mate (2002) - Benedetta
- Un mondo d'amore (2002)
- All'alba saliremo il monte (2002)
- Love Returns (2004)
- Nicola, li dove sorge il sole (2006)
- The Cézanne Affair (2009) - Signorina Lo Turco
- Piripiccho - L'ultima mossa (2010)
- Senza arte né parte (2011) - Mamma Carmine
- Non me lo dire (2012)
- Pane e burlesque (2014)
- Noi siamo Francesco (2014) - La tata
- Chi m'ha visto (2017) - Natuzza (final film role)
