= The Nest of the Turtledove =

2016 film

- Film poster
- Directed by: Taras Tkachenko
- Written by: Taras Tkachenko
- Starring: Rimma Zyubina
- Music by: Stefano Lentini
- Release dates: 12 May 2016 (Cannes); 20 July 2016 (Ukraine)
- Running time: 101 minutes
- Country: Ukraine
- Language: Ukrainian

The Nest of the Turtledove (Ukrainian: «Гніздо горлиці») is a 2016 Ukrainian drama film directed by Taras Tkachenko. It was named as one of three films shortlisted as the Ukrainian submission for the Academy Award for Best Foreign Language Film, but it was not selected.

== The plot ==
The protagonist had a wonderful family - a beloved husband and a sweet daughter. At first, the husband lost his job, the daughter grew up, and the income she had at her own job was extremely insufficient. So, when one of her friends suggested that she go to work in sunny Italy, she agreed. And now she is returning to her native Bukovyna. However, there is no joy in her eyes, and a small heart beats under her breast, but she returns

== Cast ==
- Rimma Zyubina as Daryna
- Vitaliy Linetskiy as Dmytro
- Mauro Cipriani as Alessandro
- Lina Bernardi as Vittoria

== Accolades ==
Award / Film Festival	Date of ceremony	Category	Recipient / nominee	Result
Odesa International Film Festival	23 July 2016	Grand Prix Golden Duke	Taras Tkachenko	Nominated
Odesa International Film Festival	23 July 2016	Golden Duke for the Best Ukrainian feature:	Taras Tkachenko	Won
