= 46th David di Donatello =

2001 Italian film awards

- Date: 9 April 2001
- Site: RAI Auditorium at Foro Italico, Rome
- Hosted by: Piero Chiambretti

Highlights
- Best Picture: The Son's Room
- Most awards: The Last Kiss and One Hundred Steps (5)
- Most nominations: The Son's Room (12)

Television coverage
- Network: Rai 2

The 46th David di Donatello ceremony, presented by the Accademia del Cinema Italiano, was held on 9 April 2001.

== Winners and nominees ==
Best Film: The Son's Room, directed by Nanni Moretti; One Hundred Steps, directed by Marco Tullio Giordana; The Last Kiss, directed by Gabriele Muccino	Best Producer: Domenico Procacci – The Last Kiss; Angelo Barbagallo, Nanni Moretti – The Son's Room; Fabrizio Mosca – One Hundred Steps
Best Director: Gabriele Muccino – The Last Kiss; Marco Tullio Giordana – One Hundred Steps; Nanni Moretti – The Son's Room	Best New Director: Alex Infascelli – Almost Blue; Roberto Andò – The Prince's Manuscript; Rolando Stefanelli – Il prezzo
Best Actor: Luigi Lo Cascio – One Hundred Steps; Stefano Accorsi – The Last Kiss; Nanni Moretti – The Son's Room	Best Actress: Laura Morante – The Son's Room; Margherita Buy – The Ignorant Fairies; Giovanna Mezzogiorno – The Last Kiss
Best Supporting Actor: Tony Sperandeo – One Hundred Steps; Silvio Orlando – The Son's Room; Claudio Santamaria – The Last Kiss	Best Supporting Actress: Stefania Sandrelli – The Last Kiss; Athina Cenci – Rosa and Cornelia; Jasmine Trinca – The Son's Room
David di Donatello for Best Screenplay: Claudio Fava, Monica Zapelli, Marco Tullio Giordana – One Hundred Steps; Linda Ferri, Nanni Moretti, Heidrun Schleef – The Son's Room; Gabriele Muccino – The Last Kiss	Best Cinematography: Lajos Koltai – Malèna; Franco Di Giacomo – Unfair Competition; Roberto Forza – One Hundred Steps
Best Production Design: Luciano Ricceri – Unfair Competition; Giancarlo Basili – The Son's Room; Francesco Frigeri – Malèna	Best Score: Nicola Piovani – The Son's Room; Ennio Morricone – Malèna; Armando Trovajoli – Unfair Competition
Best Editing: Claudio Di Mauro – The Last Kiss; Esmeralda Calabria – The Son's Room; Roberto Missiroli – One Hundred Steps	Best Sound: Gaetano Carito – The Last Kiss; Fulgenzio Ceccon – One Hundred Steps; Alessandro Zanon – The Son's Room
Best Costumes: Elisabetta Montaldo – One Hundred Steps; Maurizio Millenotti – Malèna; Odette Nicoletti – Unfair Competition	Best Short Film: Gavetta, directed by Craig Bell; Cecchi Gori Cecchi Gori?, directed by Rocco Papaleo
Best Foreign Film: The Taste of Others, directed by Agnès Jaoui; Billy Elliot, directed by Stephen Daldry; Chocolat, directed by Lasse Hallström; In the Mood for Love, directed by Wong Kar-wai	David Scuola: One Hundred Steps, directed by Marco Tullio Giordana; Special David Awards: Tony Curtis; Martin Scorsese; Enzo Verzini
