= Coast guard (disambiguation) =

A coast guard is a maritime security organization.

It may also refer to:

- Coast Guard (film), a 1939 American film
- The Coast Guard (film), a 2002 South Korean film
