= The Blonde (1993 film) =

1993 Italian drama film

- Theatrical release poster
- Italian: La bionda
- Directed by: Sergio Rubini
- Written by: Gianfilippo Ascione; Umberto Marino; Sergio Rubini
- Produced by: Domenico Procacci
- Starring: Nastassja Kinski; Sergio Rubini; Ennio Fantastichini; Luca Barbareschi
- Cinematography: Alessio Gelsini Torresi
- Edited by: Angelo Nicolini
- Music by: Jürgen Knieper
- Production company: Fandango
- Distributed by: Penta Film
- Release date: 12 March 1993
- Running time: 121 minutes (Italian cut); 98 minutes (intl. cut)
- Country: Italy
- Language: Italian
- Budget: L.7 billion
- Box office: L.342.2 million

The Blonde (Italian: La bionda) is a 1993 Italian thriller film directed by Sergio Rubini and co-written by Rubini, Filippo Ascione and Umberto Marino. It stars Nastassja Kinski as the titular blonde, a woman who loses her memory after an accident; Rubini as the man responsible for the accident which takes an interest in her while she recovers; and Ennio Fantastichini as her original love interest.

== Cast ==
- Nastassja Kinski as Christine
- Sergio Rubini as Tommaso Montefusco
- Ennio Fantastichini as Alberto
- Veronica Lazăr
- Umberto Raho as Giacomini
- Giacomo Piperno
- Luca Barbareschi as Annibaldi
- Enzo Andronico
- Carlo Cataneo
- Alberto Cracco
- Nicola De Buono
- Luis Molteni
- Antonello Scarano as Antonello
- Giuseppe Tosco

== Production ==
=== Development ===
Sergio Rubini first met Nastassja Kinski while filming Federico Fellini's Intervista (1987), which was produced by her husband Ibrahim Moussa, and later conceived The Blonde with her in mind for the role of Christine after she expressed admiration for his directorial debut The Station (1990). As with The Station, the film was produced by Domenico Procacci for Fandango, marking his fifth feature as a producer.

=== Filming ===
Principal photography began in February 1992 and concluded in July 1992, taking place primarily in Milan. The car-crash scene was shot on the Autostrada A26 junction near Ghevio, a frazione of Meina.

The production quickly fell behind schedule, due in part to the relative inexperience of both Procacci and Rubini, as well as the decision to shoot most scenes outdoors and at night, which introduced additional challenges related to weather conditions and urban nightlife. The self-described perfectionism of Rubini and cinematographer Alessio Gelsini Torresi further contributed to delays, with Procacci also pressing for reshoots. Filming ultimately lasted 19 weeks, well over the 10 weeks originally projected by Procacci, with the budget ballooning to 7 billion liras. Procacci later remarked: "[I came out] feeling 20 years older. I managed to amass all the mistakes a producer can make in an entire career, and then some".

Filming was further disrupted in May 1992 by Kinski's sudden departure for the United States, where she fled with her two children after Italian authorities revoked her custody following charges of child neglect and abduction leveled at her by Moussa; the two were entering divorce proceedings after Kinski's affair with Quincy Jones had been made public months earlier. The warrant was overturned in July 1992, allowing her to return to Italy and complete the shoot.

== Release ==
Initially aimed for a September 1992 release, the film was eventually released in Italy by Penta Film on 12 March 1993. It was sold internationally at the Marché du Film of the 1994 Cannes Film Festival in a 20 minutes-shorter cut.

== Reception ==
The film emerged as a huge box office bomb, grossing just L.342.2 million domestically, on a budget of L.7 billion. Procacci's Fandango was almost bankrupted.
