= 38th Karlovy Vary International Film Festival =

The 38th Karlovy Vary International Film Festival took place from 4 to 12 July 2003. The Crystal Globe was won by Facing Windows, an Italian drama film directed by Ferzan Özpetek. The second prize, the Special Jury Prize was won by Babusya, a Croatian drama film directed by Lidiya Bobrova.

== Juries ==
The following people formed the juries of the festival:

Main competition

- Rock Demers, Jury President (Canada)
- Buddhadeb Dasgupta (India)
- Aňa Geislerová (Czech Republic)
- Baltasar Kormákur (Poland)
- Felice Laudadio (Italy)
- Sunmin Park (USA)
- Branko Šömen (Slovenia)

Documentaries

- Gunnar Bergdahl, president (Sweden)
- Ivan Vojnár (Czech Republic)
- Ludmila Cviková (Netherlands)
- Jelena Stišová (Russia)
- Atahualpa Lichy (Venezuela)

== Official selection awards ==
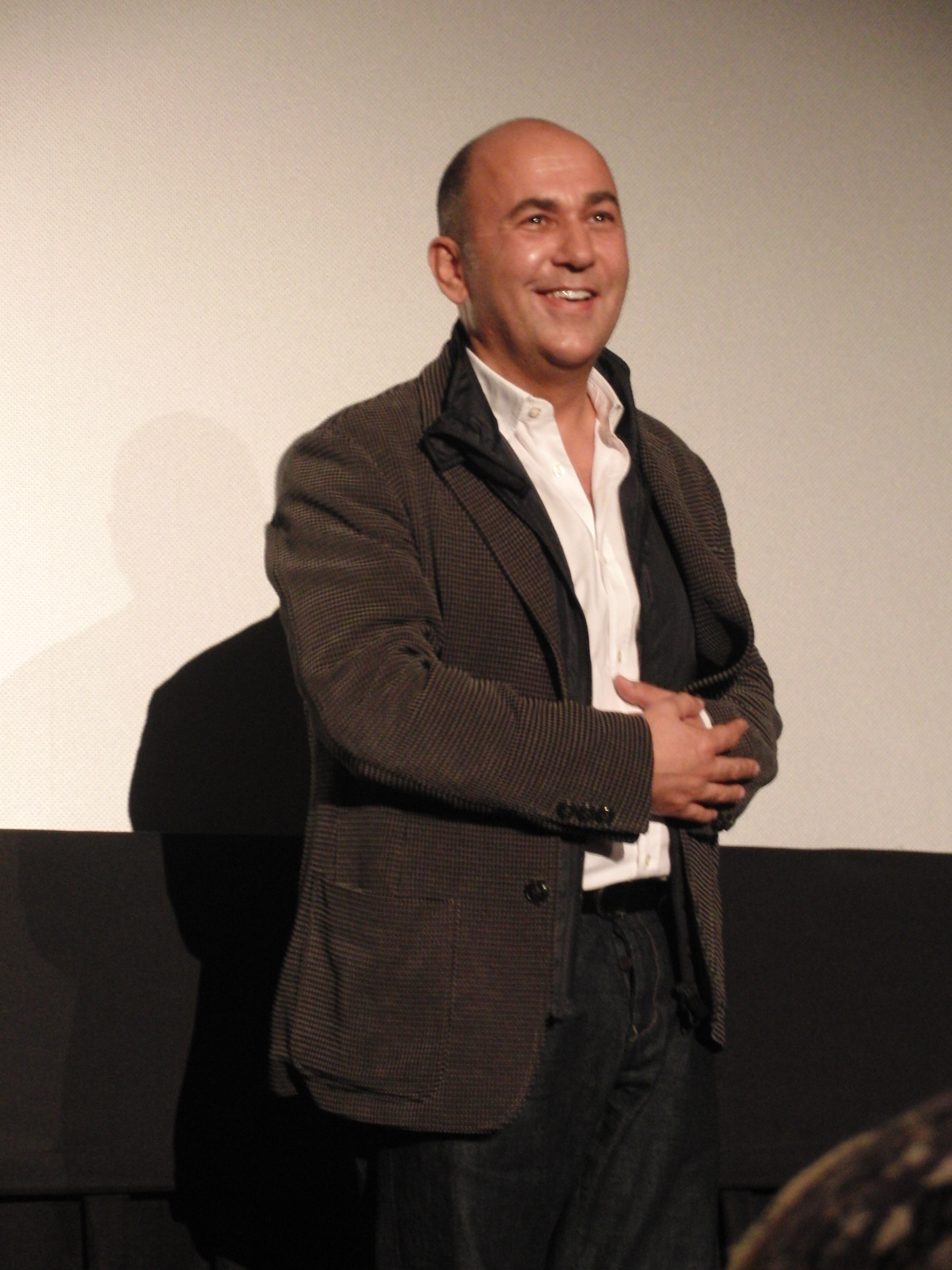
Ferzan Özpetek, director of Facing Windows

The following feature films and people received the official selection awards:

- Crystal Globe (Grand Prix) - Facing Windows (La Finestra di fronte) by Ferzan Özpetek (Italy, UK, Turkey, Portugal)
- Special Jury Prize - Babusya (Babusja) by Lidiya Bobrova (Russia, France)
- Best Director Award - Ferzan Özpetek for Facing Windows (La Finestra di fronte) (Italy, UK, Turkey, Portugal)
- Best Actress Award (ex aequo) - Sylvie Testud for her role in Fear and Trembling (Stupeur et Tremblements) (France, Japan) & Giovanna Mezzogiorno for her role in Facing Windows (La Finestra di fronte) (Italy, UK, Turkey, Portugal)
- Best Actor Award - Björn Kjellman for his role in Old, New, Borrowed and Blue (Se til venstre, der er en svensker) (Denmark)
- Special Jury Mention - Fear and Trembling (Stupeur et Tremblements) by Alain Corneau (France, Japan) & A Rózsa énekei by Andor Szilágyi (Hungary)

== Other statutory awards ==
Other statutory awards that were conferred at the festival:

- Best documentary film (over 30 min.) - Jesus, You Know (Jesus, Du weisst) by Ulrich Seidl (Austria)
  - Special Jury Mention - Documentarist (Vaveragrogh) by Harutyun Khachatryan (Armenia)
- Best documentary film (under 30 min.) - The Zone (Zonen) by Esaisas Baitel (Sweden)
  - Special Jury Mention - My Body (Kroppen min) by Margreth Olin (Norway) & Portrait (Portret) by Sergei Loznitsa (Russia)
- Crystal Globe for Outstanding Artistic Contribution to World Cinema - Stephen Frears (UK), Jiří Menzel (Czech Republic), Morgan Freeman (USA)
- Award of the Town of Karlovy Vary - The Coast Guard (Haeanseon) Kim Ki-duk (South Korea)
- Audience Award - Buddy by Lars Gudmestad (Norway)

== Non-statutory awards ==
The following non-statutory awards were conferred at the festival:

- FIPRESCI International Critics Award: The Coast Guard (Haeanseon) Kim Ki-duk (South Korea)
- FICC - The Don Quixote Prize: Babusya (Babusja) by Lidiya Bobrova (Russia, France)
- Ecumenical Jury Award: Babusya (Babusja) by Lidiya Bobrova (Russia, France)
- Philip Morris Film Award: Roads to Koktebel (Koktebel) by Boris Khlebnikov and Aleksey Popogrebskiy (Russia) and Edi by Piotr Trzaskalski (Poland)
- NETPAC Award: The Coast Guard (Haeanseon) Kim Ki-duk (South Korea)
