= Next Stop Paradise =

Next Stop Paradise may refer to:

- Next Stop Paradise (1980 film), Danish film
- Next Stop Paradise (1998 film), Romanian film
