= Don't Tell (2005 film) =

2005 film

- Film poster
- Italian: La bestia nel cuore
- Directed by: Cristina Comencini
- Written by: Cristina Comencini; Giulia Calenda; Francesca Marciano
- Produced by: Marco Chimenz; Giovanni Stabilini
- Starring: Giovanna Mezzogiorno; Alessio Boni; Stefania Rocca; Angela Finocchiaro; Giuseppe Battiston; Francesca Inaudi; Luigi Lo Cascio
- Cinematography: Fabio Cianchetti
- Music by: Franco Piersanti
- Distributed by: Lionsgate Films
- Release date: 9 September 2005
- Running time: 120 minutes
- Country: Italy
- Languages: Italian; English

Don't Tell (Italian: La bestia nel cuore, lit. 'The beast in the heart') is a 2005 Italian drama film directed by Cristina Comencini, based on a novel written by her.

It was nominated for Golden Lion prize at the 62nd Venice International Film Festival, and also for the Best Foreign Language Film category in the 78th Academy Awards.

== Plot ==
Sabina leads a relatively ordinary life, finding satisfaction in her career as a dubbing actress and in her relationship with Franco, an actor facing a lack of work who reluctantly takes a job in a television series directed by the talented but disillusioned director, Andrea Negri. The relocation of her parents' graves triggers Sabina's gradual recollection of her own childhood, spent in a strict middle-class family. Subsequently, she begins experiencing terrifying nightmares and confides in Emilia, her closest friend, who is blind due to a degenerative disease.

While walking through the city center with her colleague Maria, Sabina discovers Maria's deep pain: the woman has been abandoned by her husband for a twenty-year-old lover. Meanwhile, Sabina discovers she is pregnant but chooses not to disclose it to Franco. Instead, she decides to spend the Christmas holidays with her older brother, Daniele, who teaches literature at the University of Virginia in Charlottesville, United States. There, she hopes to gain clarity and serenity by discussing their past.

Warmly welcomed by her brother and his family, Sabina confides in him about her pregnancy and her haunting nightmares. However, it's not until New Year's Eve, when Franco cheats on her with Anita, an actress from the series, that Daniele reveals the traumatic truth of their childhood: their father had abused them, with the silent consent of their mother. Daniele had intervened to protect Sabina, even threatening their father with violence. Years later, their father's death came after Daniele arranged for him to receive a fatal dose of morphine.

Daniele's revelation strengthens the bond between them, and he believes Sabina's impending motherhood will aid her healing process. Back in Italy, however, Sabina's relationship with Franco grows colder despite her pregnancy, which dissuades him from admitting his infidelity. Meanwhile, Sabina is delighted to learn of the blossoming romance between Emilia and Maria, whom she had introduced to each other. The shared loneliness of both women had drawn them together.

The tension escalates during a summer visit to Negri's farmhouse, where Franco is collaborating with the director on a film project. Maria struggles with her feelings for Emilia, and Franco, suspicious of Sabina's distant behavior, confesses his infidelity. Sabina, in turn, reveals her painful childhood experiences. Sabina's sudden disappearance from the farmhouse raises alarm due to her advanced pregnancy and the intense heat.

She unexpectedly goes into labor on a deserted train, surrounded by olive trees. Met at the hospital by Franco and the others, Sabina gives birth to a baby boy, reuniting with her partner, while Maria and Emilia also reconcile. Seeing the newborn, Negri decides to include him in his film project, despite objections from a nurse who insists only parents should handle the baby. In America, Daniele vows to visit Sabina and his namesake nephew, optimistic that they will both overcome their past traumas and lead fulfilling lives.

== Cast ==
- Giovanna Mezzogiorno as Sabina
- Alessio Boni as Franco
- Stefania Rocca as Emilia, long-time friend of Sabina
- Angela Finocchiaro as Maria, friend and co-worker of Sabina
- Luigi Lo Cascio as Daniele, Sabina's brother
- Francesca Inaudi as Anita, Daniele's wife
- Giuseppe Battiston as Andrea Negr
- Valerio Binasco as father
- Simona Lisi as mother

== Reception ==
=== Critical response ===
The Beast in the Heart has an approval rating of 25% on review aggregator website Rotten Tomatoes, based on 20 reviews, and an average rating of 5.20/10. The website's critical consensus states, "As well-intentioned as it is heavy-handed, Don't Tell mishandles a worthy subject with a meandering and melodramatic story." Metacritic assigned the film a weighted average score of 52 out of 100, based on 10 critics, indicating "mixed or average reviews".

=== Awards ===
- David di Donatello Awards for the Best Supporting Actress: Angela Finocchiaro
- Nastro d'Argento Prizes (Best Supporting Actress: Angela Finocchiaro – Best Cinematography: Fabio Cianchetti – Best Producer: Riccardo Tozzi, Marco Chimenz and Giovanni Stabilini)
- Volpi Cup for the Best Actress at the Venice Film Festival: Giovanna Mezzogiorno
