= 55th Venice International Film Festival =

Italian film festival in 1998

- Opening film: Saving Private Ryan
- Closing film: Am I Beautiful?
- Location: Venice, Italy
- Founded: 1932
- Awards: Golden Lion: The Way We Laughed
- Artistic director: Felice Laudadio
- Festival date: 3 – 13 September 1998
- Website: Website

Venice Film Festival chronology
- 56th 54th

The 55th annual Venice International Film Festival was held between 3 and 13 September 1998.

Italian filmmaker Ettore Scola was the Jury President of the Main Competition.

The Golden Lion was awarded to The Way We Laughed by Gianni Amelio.

== Juries ==
=== Main Competition ===
The following people comprised the 1998 jury:

- Ettore Scola, Italian filmmaker - Jury President
- Héctor Babenco, Argentine-Brazilian filmmaker
- Sarunas Bartas, Lithuanian filmmaker
- Kathryn Bigelow, American filmmaker and producer
- Reinhard Hauff, German director
- Danièle Heymann, French film critic and journalist
- Ismail Merchant, Indian director and producer
- Luis Sepúlveda, Chilean writer
- Tilda Swinton, British actress

=== Short Films Competition ===
- Georges Benayoun, Moroccan - Jury President
- Chiara Caselli, Italian actress
- Abel Ferrara, American filmmaker and actor

== Official Sections ==
The following films were selected to be screened:

=== In Competition ===
English title	Original title	Director(s)	Production country
Autumn Tale	Conte d'automne	Eric Rohmer	France
Black Cat, White Cat	Crna mačka, beli mačor	Emir Kusturica	France, Germany, FR Yugoslavia
Bulworth		Warren Beatty	United States
The Cloud	La nube	Fernando Solanas	France, Argentina
Dancing at Lughnasa		Pat O'Connor	Ireland, United States
The Garden of Eden	I giardini dell'Eden	Alessandro D'Alatri	Italy
Hilary and Jackie		Anand Tucker	United Kingdom
Hurlyburly		Anthony Drazan	United States
Little Teachers	I piccoli maestri	Daniele Luchetti	Italy
Lovers of the Arctic Circle	Los amantes del círculo polar	Julio Medem	Spain
New Rose Hotel		Abel Ferrara	United States
Next Stop Paradise	Terminus Paradis	Lucian Pintilie	Romania
Place Vendôme		Nicole Garcia	France
Rounders		John Dahl	United States
Run Lola Run	Lola rennt	Tom Tykwer	Germany
Shooting the Moon	L'Albero delle pere	Francesca Archibugi	Italy
The Silence	سکوت	Mohsen Makhmalbaf	Iran, Tajikistan, France
Stolen Life	Voleur de vie	Yves Angelo	France
Traffic	Tráfico	João Botelho	Portugal, France, Denmark
The Way We Laughed	Così ridevano	Gianni Amelio	Italy

=== Out of Competition ===
English title	Original title	Director(s)	Production country
Am I Beautiful? (closing film)	Bin ich schön?	Doris Dörrie	Germany
The Ballad of the Windshield Washers	La ballata dei lavavetri	Peter Del Monte	Italy
Celebrity		Woody Allen	United States
Chance or Coincidence	Hasards ou coïncidences	Claude Lelouch	France
Elizabeth		Shekhar Kapur	United Kingdom
Incontri proibiti		Alberto Sordi	Italy
Of Lost Love	Del perduto amore	Michele Placido	Italy
Saving Private Ryan (opening film)		Steven Spielberg	United States
A Soldier's Daughter Never Cries		James Ivory	United Kingdom
You Laugh	Tu ridi	Paolo and Vittorio Taviani	Italy

=== Prospectives (Prospettive) ===
English title	Original title	Director(s)	Production country
American Bet	Американка	Dmitry Meskhiev	Russia
L'anniversario		Mario Orfini	Italy
Bullet Ballet	バレット・バレエ	Shinya Tsukamoto	Japan
Buena Vista Social Club		Wim Wenders	Germany
Cabaret Balkan	Буре барута	Goran Paskaljević	Yugoslavia
Connection by Fate	超級公民	Wan Jen	Taiwan
Crush Proof		Paul Tickell	Ireland
Endurance		Leslie Woodhead	United States, United Kingdom, Germany
L'Ennui		Cédric Kahn	France
Far from One's Eyes	Longe da vista	João Mário Grilo	Portugal, France
Friendly Fire	Ação Entre Amigos	Beto Brant	Brazil
Guests	Ospiti	Matteo Garrone	Italy
Into My Heart		Anthony Stark, Sean Smith	United States
Liv		Edoardo Ponti	United States
Living in Paradise	Vivre au paradis	Bourlem Guerdjou	Algeria
The Loss of Sexual Innocence		Mike Figgis	United States
Lucky and Zorba	La gabbianella e il gatto	Enzo D'Alò	Italy
The Second Wife	La seconda moglie	Ugo Chiti	Italy
Shadrach		Susanne Styron	United States
Shattered Image		Raúl Ruiz	United States
Side Streets		Tony Gerber	United Kingdom
Speak Like a Child		John Akomfrah	United Kingdom
State of Dogs	Нохойн орон	Peter Brosens, Dorjkhandyn Turmunkh	Mongolia
Sun Bird	太阳鸟	Wang Xueqi, Yang Liping	China
Train of Life	Train de vie	Radu Mihăileanu	France, Belgium, Netherlands, Israel, Romania
Traps	Pasti, pasti, pasticky	Věra Chytilová	Czech Republic
Viol@		Donatella Maiorca	Italy
Vite in sospeso		Marco Turco	Italy
Yara		Yılmaz Arslan	Turkey, Germany
Yom Yom		Amos Gitai	Israel

=== Nights and Stars (Notti e Stelle) ===
English title	Original title	Director(s)	Production country
Another Day in Paradise		Larry Clark	United States
Apt Pupil		Bryan Singer	United States
He Got Game		Spike Lee	United States
Lautrec		Roger Planchon	France
Out of Sight		Steven Soderbergh	United States
A Perfect Murder		Andrew Davis	United States
Poodle Springs		Bob Rafelson	United States
Radiofreccia		Luciano Ligabue	Italy
The Red Violin		François Girard	Canada
Ronin		John Frankenheimer	United States
The Truman Show		Peter Weir	United States

=== Special screenings ===
English title	Original title	Director(s)	Production country
Tribute to Totò
Totomodo: l'arte spiegata anche ai bambini		Achille Bonito Oliva	Italy
Sessantotto e dintorni
Artists Under the Big Top: Perplexed	Die Artisten in der Zirkuskuppel: Ratlos	Alexander Kluge	West Germany
Il cinema ritrovato
Adua and Her Friends	Adua e le compagne	Antonio Pietrangeli	Italy
The General of the Dead Army	l generale dell'armata morta	Luciano Tovoli	Italy
Stranger on the Prowl	Imbarco a mezzanotte	Joseph Losey	Italy, United States
Paisan	Paisà	Roberto Rossellini	Italy
The Singing Princess	La Rosa di Bagdad	Anton Gino Domenighini	Italy

== Independent Sections ==
=== Venice International Film Critics' Week ===
The following feature films were selected to be screened as In Competition for this section:

English title	Original title	Director(s)	Production country
Beat		Amon Miyamoto	Japan
Ghodoua Nahrek		Mohamed Ben Smàil	Tunisia
The Iron Heel of Oligarchy	Zheleznaya pyata oligarkhii	Aleksandr Bashirov	Russia
Mother Christian	La mère Christain	Myriam Boyer	France
The Opposite of Sex		Don Roos	United States
Orphans		Peter Mullan	United Kingdom
The Scent of the Night	L'odore della notte	Claudio Caligari	Italy

== Official Awards ==
=== Main Competition ===
- Golden Lion: The Way We Laughed by Gianni Amelio
- Grand Special Jury Prize: Next Stop Paradise by Lucian Pintilie
- Silver Lion: Black Cat, White Cat by Emir Kusturica
- Golden Osella:
  - Best Screenplay: Eric Rohmer for Autumn Tale
  - Best Cinematography: Luca Bigazzi for The Way We Laughed
  - Best Score: Gerardo Gandini for The Cloud
- Volpi Cup for Best Actor: Sean Penn for Hurlyburly
- Volpi Cup for Best Actress: Catherine Deneuve for Place Vendôme
- Marcello Mastroianni Award: Niccolò Senni for Shooting the Moon

=== Golden Lion for Lifetime Achievement ===
- Sophia Loren
- Andrzej Wajda
- Warren Beatty

== Independent Awards ==
=== The President of the Italian Senate's Gold Medal ===
- The Silence by Mohsen Makhmalbaf

=== FIPRESCI Prize ===
- Best First Feature: Train of Life by Radu Mihăileanu
- Best Feature: Cabaret Balkan by Goran Paskaljević

=== OCIC Award ===
- Shooting the Moon by Francesca Archibugi

=== UNICEF Award ===
- Shooting the Moon by Francesca Archibugi

=== UNESCO Award ===
- Colonel Bunker by Kujtim Çashku
  - Special Mention: The Cloud by Fernando Solanas

=== Pasinetti Award ===
- Best Actor: The Garden of Eden by Kim Rossi Stuart
- Best Actress: Del perduto amore by Giovanna Mezzogiorno

=== Pietro Bianchi Award ===
- Michelangelo Antonioni

=== Isvema Award ===
- Orphans by Peter Mullan

=== FEDIC Award ===
- Del perduto amore by Michele Placido
  - Special Mention: Ospiti by Matteo Garrone
  - Special Mention: Sto lavorando? by Daniele Segre

=== Little Golden Lion ===
- Crna macka, beli macor by Emir Kusturica

=== Anicaflash Prize ===
- Train of Life by Radu Mihăileanu

=== Elvira Notari Prize ===
- Trap, Trap, Little Trap by Věra Chytilová
  - Special Mention: New Rose Hotel (Abel Ferrara)

=== Cult Network Italia Prize ===
- Orphans by Peter Mullan

=== FilmCritica "Bastone Bianco" Award ===
- New Rose Hotel by Abel Ferrara

=== Laterna Magica Prize ===
- Crna macka, beli macor by Emir Kusturica

=== Sergio Trasatti Award ===
- The Garden of Eden by Alessandro D'Alatri
  - Special Mention: Autumn Tale by Éric Rohmer
  - Special Mention: Così ridevano by Gianni Amelio
  - Special Mention: The Silence by Mohsen Makhmalbaf

=== CinemAvvenire Award ===
- Best Film on the Relationship Man-Nature: The Silence by Mohsen Makhmalbaf
- Best Film: The Cloud by Fernando Solanas
- Best First Film: Vivre au paradis by Bourlem Guerdjou

=== Kodak Award ===
- Orphans by Peter Mullan
- IN-COMPETITION: Ospiti by Matteo Garrone

=== Prix Pierrot ===
- Orphans by Peter Mullan

=== Max Factor Award ===
- Elizabeth by Jenny Shircore
