= The Cézanne Affair =

2009 film

- Directed by: Sergio Rubini
- Written by: Sergio Rubini; Domenico Starnone; Carla Cavalluzzi
- Starring: Sergio Rubini; Valeria Golino; Riccardo Scamarcio; Fabrizio Gifuni; Anna Falchi; Maurizio Micheli; Margherita Buy
- Cinematography: Fabio Cianchetti
- Music by: Nicola Piovani
- Distributed by: 01 Distribution
- Release date: 2009
- Running time: 120 min
- Language: Italian

The Cézanne Affair (Italian: L'uomo nero) is a 2009 Italian comedy drama film written, directed and starred by Sergio Rubini. For her performance in the film, the actress Valeria Golino was nominated in the category for best actress at the Nastro d'Argento Awards.

== Plot ==
The plot of the film is a flashback by Gabriele Rossetti, a young teacher who returns to Bari upon the death of his father Ernesto. Ernesto Rossetti was the stationmaster in the small Apulian village of San Vito dei Normanni. He lived happily with his wife and his little son, Gabriele. However, Ernesto had artistic ambitions and was fond of Paul Cézanne's painting after he saw the artist's water colour self-portrait in Bari. Ernesto wanted to make an exhibition in his homage to the country, but the local art critic, truncated and conceited, stunned the exhibition with a newspaper article.

Ernesto did not win for himself. He copied Cézanne's work, neglecting the family especially Gabriele, who began to grow afraid of him and hate him. On his son's birthday, Ernesto showed the local art critic the new picture; and he again negatively commented the work, stirring up Ernesto's wrath, giving an inconvenient shock to his son Gabriele. When Gabriele grew up, he eventually discovered that Ernesto had deceived everyone with the second painting, which he replaced with the original of Paul Cézanne, in order to prove the deceit of the villagers and the critic.

== Cast ==
- Sergio Rubini as Ernesto Rossetti
- Valeria Golino as Franca
- Riccardo Scamarcio as Pinuccio
- Guido Giaquinto as Gabriele Rossetti
- Anna Falchi as Donna Valeria Giordano
- Mario Maranzana as Museum Director
- Vito Signorile as Professor Venusio
- Maurizio Micheli as Lawyer Pezzetti
- Mariolina De Fano as Mrs. Lo Turco
- Fabrizio Gifuni as Gabriele Rossetti (Adult)
- Margherita Buy as Anna
