= Daniele Gaglianone =

Italian director (born 1966)

- Born: 4 November 1966; Ancona, Italy
- Occupation: Actor

Daniele Gaglianone is an Italian director.

== Biography ==
Born in Ancona, Gaglianone has lived in Turin since the age of six.

From 1989 to 2000 he realized a few shorts and documentary films. In 1998 he works as scenarist for the film Così ridevano directed by Gianni Amelio. He also realized a few works for theater with, among others, the Italian company Il BuioFuori.

In 2000 he realized his first feature film I nostri anni, presented at the 2001 Cannes Film Festival during the Quinzaine des Réalisateurs. His second film Nemmeno il destino was presented at the Venice International Film Festival, during the "Giornate degli autori", in 2004. That film received various awards in the same year, i.e.: the Premio Arca Cinema Giovani as best Italian film in Venice, the Premio Lino Miccichè awarded by CSC, and a "Tiger Award" at the International Film Festival Rotterdam.

In 2004-2005 he publishes the CD and book Come ordini urlati in una tempesta di vento, a text of theater inspired by Malcolm Lowry, co-signed by Massimo Miride and Evandro Fornasier and realized with the group "Il BuioFuori".

In 2008 he realizes the documentary film Rata nece biti, (La guerra non ci sarà), presented at the al 61st Locarno Film Festival and recipient of the Special Jury Award at the 26th Torino Film Festival. In 2009 the film obtains also the David di Donatello for best documentary. On 20 August 2010 his third feature film, Pietro, was presented in competition at the Locarno Film Festival. In July 2011 the film received a Cigno d'Oro at the cinematographic encounters in Stresa. The same year he presented Ruggine, an adaptation of a book of Stefano Massaron starring Filippo Timi, Stefano Accorsi, Valerio Mastandrea and Valeria Solarino.

== Selected filmography ==
- Il frascame (1989)
- Nella solitudine del sangue (1990)
- La ferita (1991)
- Mario Soldati e il cinema (1992)
- Alla ricerca di Piero Gobetti (1992)
- Era meglio morire da piccoli (1992)
- Cichero (1993)
- La battaglia della ferrovia (1993)
- Sparare a vista sul sovversivo Agosti (1993)
- L'orecchio ferito del piccolo comandante (1994)
- Il sale della terra (1994)
- Quel fare che inventa (mentre fa) il modo di fare (1994)
- Lancia di Chivasso: una comunità operaia non rassegnata (1994)
- E finisce così (1995)
- La violenza nemica (1995)
- Cinecronache partigiane (1995)
- La carne sulle ossa (1996)
- Antonio Gramsci, gli anni torinesi (1997)
- Luoghi inagibili in attesa di ristrutturazione capitale (1997)
- Vratite se (1998)
- Un inverno invisibile (1999)
- Dopo settantanni i ricordi non esistono più. Paolo Gobetti racconta (1999)
- Tutti mi chiedono da dove vengo – Nessuno vuol sapere chi sono (1999)
- Spazzacamini e altri mestieri (2000)
- Guarda un po' che fiume (2000)
- I nostri anni (2000)
- Changing Destiny (Nemmeno il destino) (2004)
- Rata nece biti, (La guerra non ci sarà) (2009)
- Pietro (2010)
- Ruggine (2011)
