= The End Is Known =

- Directed by: Cristina Comencini
- Written by: Cristina Comencini; Suso Cecchi D'Amico
- Starring: Fabrizio Bentivoglio; Valerie Kaprisky; Carlo Cecchi
- Cinematography: Dante Spinotti
- Edited by: Nino Baragli
- Music by: Fiorenzo Carpi; Alessio Vlad; Claudio Capponi
- Release date: 1992
- Running time: 97 minutes
- Countries: Italy; France
- Language: Italian

The End Is Known (Italian: La fine è nota, French: La fin est connue) is a 1992 Italian-French mystery film directed by Cristina Comencini. It is an adaptation of the novel with the same name by Geoffrey Holiday Hall, in which the setting is moved from post-war America to 1980s' Italy.

== Cast ==
- Fabrizio Bentivoglio as Lawyer Bernardo Manni
- Valérie Kaprisky as Maria Manni
- Carlo Cecchi as "Cervello" (the brain)
- Mariangela Melato as Elena Malva
- Valeria Moriconi as Elvira Delogu
- Massimo Wertmüller as Carlo Piane
- Corso Salani as Rosario
- Daria Nicolodi as Lawyer Mila
- Valeria Milillo as Archivista
- Stefano Viali as Lawyer Anselmi
- Marina Perzy as Miss Gerli
