= 2004 in Italian television =

This is a list of Italian television related events from 2004.

== Events ==
- 6 May – Serena Garitta wins the fourth season of Grande Fratello.
- 2 December – Jonathan Kashanian wins the fifth season of Grande Fratello.

== Debuts ==
=== Domestic ===
- 28 January – Winx Club (Rai 2) (2004–present)

=== International ===
- 30 August – (United States) SpongeBob SquarePants (Italia 1) (1999–present)
- 9 September – (United States) / (Canada) Tripping the Rift (Fox) (2004–2007)
- (Croatia) / (Germany) Lapitch the Little Shoemaker (Rai 2)(2000)

== Television shows ==
=== Drama ===
- Luisa Sanfelice – by the Taviani Brothers, from the Alexandre Dumas' novel, with Laetitia Casta in the title role, Adriano Giannini and Emilio Solfrizzi (Fenrdinand I); 2 episodes.

=== Variety ===
- Bitte, keine reklame (In German, "Please, no publicity") – experimental show about music, philosophy and mysticism, hosted by Franco Battiato, with Sonia Bergamasco.

=== Mediaset ===
- Grande Fratello (2000–present)

== Networks and services ==
=== Launches ===
| Network | Type | Launch date | Notes | Source |
|---|---|---|---|---|
| Caccia e Pesca | Cable and satellite | Unknown | | |
| Sportitalia | Cable and satellite | 6 February | | |
| Radio Italia TV | Cable and satellite | April | | |
| Fox Life | Cable and satellite | 13 May | | |
| Sky Meteo 24 | Cable and satellite | 1 August | | |
| Nickelodeon | Cable and satellite | 1 November | | |
| Boing | Cable and satellite | 20 November | | |
| Paramount Comedy | Cable and satellite | 1 December | | |

== See also ==
- List of Italian films of 2004
