= Let's Talk (2015 film) =

- Directed by: Sergio Rubini
- Written by: Sergio Rubini; Carla Cavalluzzi; Diego De Silva
- Starring: Fabrizio Bentivoglio; Isabella Ragonese; Maria Pia Calzone; Sergio Rubini
- Cinematography: Vincenzo Carpineta
- Music by: Michele Fazio
- Release date: November 21, 2015 (Rome Film Fest)
- Running time: 101 minutes
- Country: Italy
- Language: Italian

Let's Talk (Italian: Dobbiamo parlare [dobˈbjaːmo parˈlaːre]) is a 2015 Italian comedy-drama film written, directed and starring Sergio Rubini. It is based on his theatre play Provando... Dobbiamo parlare. It premiered at the 2015 Rome Film Festival.

== Plot ==
Vanni and Linda have been engaged for ten years, they live together in a penthouse in central Rome. He is a writer, she is his ghostwriter. Their best friends are Costanza and Alfredo, known as Prof. Two doctors, she is a dermatologist and he is a heart surgeon in love with his job. They are married, have no children and manage their marriage like a business company.

Costanza suddenly discovers that Prof. has a lover, and in the throes of a panic attack, she bursts into the home of Vanni and Linda. Thus begins the longest night for the four protagonists who, between quarrels, jokes, laughter and admissions of guilt, will put their loves and friendships at stake.

== Cast ==
- Sergio Rubini as Vanni
- Isabella Ragonese as Linda
- Fabrizio Bentivoglio as Alfredo
- Maria Pia Calzone as Costanza

== See also ==
- List of Italian films of 2015
