= Lina Bernardi =

Italian actress (1938–2026)

Lina Bernardi (5 September 1938 – 13 January 2026) was an Italian actress and acting and diction teacher.

Lina Bernardi born in Latina in 1938. She appeared in films such as The Story of Piera (1983), The Last Kiss (2001) and The Embalmer (2002). She died in Latina on 13 January 2026, at the age of 87.
