= The Widowmaker =

1990 British television film

- Written by: Jeremy Brock
- Directed by: John Madden
- Starring: Annabelle Apsion; Alun Armstrong; David Morrissey; Kenneth Welsh
- Music by: Rachel Portman
- Country of origin: United Kingdom
- Original language: English

Production
- Cinematography: Michael Coulter
- Editor: David Rees
- Running time: 104 minutes
- Production company: Central Independent Television

Original release
- Network: ITV
- Release: 29 December 1990

The Widowmaker is a 1990 made-for-television film directed by John Madden and starring Annabelle Apsion, Alun Armstrong, David Morrissey and Kenneth Welsh. The film deals with a woman whose husband has been arrested after going on a killing rampage and the reaction of her local community. It was produced In the United Kingdom by Central Independent Television for the ITV network and aired on 29 December 1990. It received a nomination for Best Single Drama at the 1991 BAFTA Awards.

== Premise ==
Kathy (Apsion) is forced to face the hostility of her local community after her husband is revealed as a brutal spree killer.

== Cast ==
- Annabelle Apsion – Kathy
- Alun Armstrong – Dad
- David Morrissey – Rob
- Kenneth Welsh – Atkinson
- Helen Anderson – Troy
- Hugh Armstrong – Michael Finch
- Al Hunter Ashton – Mr. Wilding
- Charlotte Barker – Vicky Pierce
- Sydnee Blake – Grieving Mother
- Kate Byers – Junior Police Officer
- Flaminia Cinque – Sally
- David Credell – Builder 3
- Richard Cubison – Dr. Beloff
- Aaron Dawson – Tom
- Peter Guinness – Detective Sergeant Wills
- Jane Gurnett – Sharon
- Brian Hickey – Malcolm
- Caroline Holdaway – Teacher
- Colin Jeavons – Mr. Crathew
- Karl Jenkinson – Builder 2
- Kate Lanson – Prostitute
- Mike Lunney – Housing Officer
- Gareth Marks – Barry
- Neale McGrath – Builder 1
- Eileen Nicholas – Mum
- James Ottaway – Mourner
- Gary Powell – Journalist
- Bill Rourke – Minicab Driver
- Martin Sadler – Senior Police Officer
- Colin Simmonds – DHSS Officer
- Peter Williams – Philip Newsome
- Tessa Wojtczak – Sheila Barton
- Darren Wilkes - Moustashioed Armed Police Officer
