= The Story of Piera =

1983 film

- Italian DVD cover
- Directed by: Marco Ferreri
- Written by: Piera Degli Esposti; Dacia Maraini; Marco Ferreri
- Produced by: Erwin C. Dietrich; Achille Manzotti; Luciano Luna
- Starring: Isabelle Huppert; Hanna Schygulla; Marcello Mastroianni
- Cinematography: Ennio Guarnieri
- Edited by: Ruggero Mastroianni
- Music by: Philippe Sarde; sax soloist Stan Getz
- Release date: 2 February 1983
- Running time: 107 minutes
- Country: Italy
- Languages: Italian, German

The Story of Piera (Italian: Storia di Piera) is a 1983 Italian drama film directed by Marco Ferreri. It is based on the book with the same name by Piera Degli Esposti and Dacia Maraini. Hanna Schygulla won the award for Best Actress at the 1983 Cannes Film Festival.

== Plot ==
The film starts in one of the new towns of Latina with the birth of Piera, daughter of the somewhat unbalanced Eugenia and her apparently sane husband Lorenzo, who has a job with the PCI. Eugenia's behaviour at home and in public becomes increasingly erratic and when on top of this Lorenzo loses his post, the strain puts him into a mental hospital. Piera leaves school to work for a dressmaker and pursues her dream of acting, eventually breaking into television and theatre. Interleaved with her outside life we see her sexual development, from kissing neighbourhood boys to a lesbian relationship while she is in hospital with breathing problems and finally to adult men. While Piera is maturing as a woman and as an actress, Eugenia is deteriorating and has to be locked away. The film ends with Piera taking her mother out for the day to a deserted beach, where the two women undress and hug each other tightly in a moment of natural tenderness.

== Cast ==
- Isabelle Huppert as Piera
- Hanna Schygulla as Eugenia
- Marcello Mastroianni as Lorenzo
- Angelo Infanti as Tito and as actor playing Jason
- Tanya Lopert as Elide
- Bettina Grühn as the young Piera
- Renato Cecchetto
- Maurizio Donadoni as Massimo
- Aiché Nanà as the midwife
- Girolamo Marzano
- Lidia Montanari as "Cento mille lires"
- Laura Trotter as young midwife
- Marina Zanchi
- Lina Bernardi
- Elisabetta Ambrosini
- Fiametta Baraila
- Serana Bennato
- Rita Caldana
- Cristina Forti
- Loredana Bertè (herself, singer "Sei bellissima")
