= Flying Lessons (2007 film) =

- Directed by: Francesca Archibugi
- Written by: Doriana Leondeff; Francesca Archibugi
- Starring: Giovanna Mezzogiorno
- Cinematography: Pasquale Mari
- Edited by: Jacopo Quadri
- Music by: Battista Lena
- Release date: 2007
- Country: Italy

Flying Lessons (Italian: Lezioni di volo) is a 2007 Italian drama film directed by Francesca Archibugi.

For her performance Giovanna Mezzogiorno was nominated for Nastro d'Argento for best actress and for David di Donatello in the same category.

== Cast ==
- Giovanna Mezzogiorno: Chiara
- Andrea Miglio Risi: Apollonio "Pollo" Sermoneta
- Angel Tom Karumathy: "Curry"
- Douglas Henshall: Aarto
- Angela Finocchiaro: Annalisa
- Roberto Citran: Stefano
- Anna Galiena: Mother of Pollo
- Flavio Bucci: Leone
- Archie Panjabi: Sharmila
