= Malèna (film) =

2000 film by Giuseppe Tornatore

- Theatrical release poster
- Directed by: Giuseppe Tornatore
- Screenplay by: Giuseppe Tornatore
- Story by: Luciano Vincenzoni
- Produced by: Harvey Weinstein; Carlo Bernasconi
- Starring: Monica Bellucci; Giuseppe Sulfaro
- Cinematography: Lajos Koltai
- Edited by: Massimo Quaglia
- Music by: Ennio Morricone
- Production companies: Medusa Film; Miramax Films; Pacific Pictures; Tele+
- Distributed by: Medusa Distribuzione (Italy); Miramax Films (international)
- Release dates: 27 October 2000 (Italy); 2 February 2001 (United States)
- Running time: 108 minutes; 92 minutes (United States cut)
- Countries: Italy; United States
- Language: Italian
- Box office: $14.4 million

Malèna is a 2000 historical romantic drama film written and directed by Giuseppe Tornatore from a story by Luciano Vincenzoni. It stars Monica Bellucci and Giuseppe Sulfaro. The film won the Grand Prix at the 2001 Cabourg Film Festival. At the 73rd Academy Awards, the film was nominated for Best Cinematography and Best Original Score.

== Plot ==
On 10 June 1940, in the small Sicilian town of Castelcutò, a teenage boy named Renato experiences three major events: Italy enters World War II; he receives a new bicycle; and he first sees the stunningly beautiful and sensual Malèna, who is the most desired young woman in town. Her husband is in the armed forces fighting the British in Africa, and she lives alone. Because of her beauty and reclusiveness, she is an object of lust for all the town's men and of hatred for its women. She tends to her infirm father, but he rejects her after receiving an anonymous note slandering her.

Renato becomes obsessed with Malèna, spying on her in her house and stalking her when she leaves it. To fuel his erotic fantasies, he steals some of her underwear from her clothes line. When his parents find it in his bedroom, they become upset and try to break his fixation.

Malèna receives news that her husband has died in the war, adding grief to her isolation. The rumours around her only intensify after she allows an unmarried air force officer to visit her after dark and the officer has an altercation with the local dentist, who was also attempting to visit Malèna, outside her home. When she is denounced and put on trial for adultery, the officer, who has been sent away, sends testimony from abroad that he was nothing more than a fling. Malèna, though hurt by his betrayal, says nothing to condemn him. After her acquittal, Malèna's lawyer visits and rapes her, claiming that this is her payment for his legal services. He continues to proposition her and she continues to reject him.

Renato resolves to protect Malèna, asking God and his saints to watch over her and performing little acts of vengeance against her detractors. He does not realise that, like the townspeople, he views Malèna as an object; he does not consider how Malèna herself feels.

When the war reaches Sicily, the Allies bomb the town, killing Malèna's father. Now penniless, universally scorned, unable to find work, and refused the sale of food by the townsfolk, Malèna turns to prostitution. Many townsfolk are happy to see her diminished position. When Nazi forces occupy the town, Malèna dyes her hair blonde and becomes a favorite of the German soldiers, increasing the townspeople's resentment of her. When Renato sees Malèna with two German soldiers, he faints. His mother believes it is demonic possession, taking him to a priest for exorcism, but his father takes him to the town brothel. There he fantasises that the prostitute he has sex with is Malèna.

As the war progresses, American troops liberate the town, welcomed by ecstatic cheers. With the German soldiers no longer present to offer Malèna protection, the townswomen storm the hotel and drag Malèna out. The townswomen rip off her clothes, beat her and cut off her hair. Renato and the other townspeople witness this assault but look on and do nothing to help Malèna. To escape further persecution, she flees the hostile town. A few days later, her husband Nino, who has survived as a prisoner of war sans one arm, comes back looking for her. His house has been taken over and converted into a refugee camp and nobody in town will admit to him what happened to Malèna or where to find her. Renato leaves him a signed note saying that despite everything that happened, that Nino was the only man she ever loved, and that she has suffered misfortunes and was last seen taking a train heading in the direction of the city of Messina.

A year later, Nino and Malèna return and are seen strolling through the town. Women notice she now looks more matronly and plain. Even if she is still beautiful, since she is now married and living with her husband, they realize that she is no longer a threat, and begin speaking of her with more respect. When she goes to the market, the women who beat her say good morning, call her madam, and even offer her free goods. Walking home, some fruit falls from her bag and Renato rushes to pick it up. Not knowing that he is the one who wrote the note about her whereabouts to Nino, she says "Thank you for your help." He wishes her good luck and she gives him an enigmatic half-smile, the only time either has ever spoken to or looked openly at the other.

The aged Renato reflects that he has known and loved many women and has forgotten many, but he has never forgotten about Malèna.

== Cast ==
- Monica Bellucci as Maddalena "Malèna" Bonsignore Scordìa
- Giuseppe Sulfaro as Renato Amoroso
- Luciano Federico as Renato's father
- Matilde Piana as Renato's mother
- Pietro Notarianni as Bonsignore, the teacher
- Gaetano Aronica as Antonino "Nino" Scordìa
- Gilberto Idonea as Centorbi, the lawyer
- Angelo Pellegrino as the Fascist party boss

== Music ==
Italian film poster

The soundtrack was nominated for an Academy Award for Best Original Score and a Golden Globe Award for Best Original Score.

== Reception ==
=== Critical response ===
On Rotten Tomatoes, the film holds an approval rating of 54% based on reviews from 78 critics, with an average rating of 5.6/10. The website's critics consensus reads, "Malena ends up objectifying the character of the movie's title. Also, the young boy's emotional investment with Malena is never convincing, as she doesn't feel like a three-dimensional person." Metacritic, which uses a weighted average, assigned the film a score of 54 out of 100, based on 22 critics, indicating "mixed or average" reviews.

David Rooney of Variety wrote, "Considerably scaled down in scope and size from his English-language existential epic, The Legend of 1900, Giuseppe Tornatore's Malena is a beautifully crafted but slight period drama that chronicles a 13-year-old boy's obsession with a small-town siren in World War II Sicily. Combining a coming-of-age story with the sad odyssey of a woman punished for her beauty, the film ultimately has too little depth, subtlety, thematic consequence or contemporary relevance to make it a strong contender for arthouse crossover. But its erotic elements and nostalgic evocation of the same vanished Italy that made international hits of Cinema Paradiso and Il Postino could supply commercial leverage."

Film critic Roger Ebert compared the film to Federico Fellini's work, writing, "Fellini's films often involve adolescents inflamed by women who embody their carnal desires (e.g. Amarcord and 8½). But Fellini sees the humor that underlies sexual obsession, except (usually but not always) in the eyes of the participants. Malena is a simpler story, in which a young man grows up transfixed by a woman and essentially marries himself to the idea of her. It doesn't help that the movie's action grows steadily gloomier, leading to a public humiliation that seems wildly out of scale with what has gone before and to an ending that is intended to move us much more deeply, alas, than it can."

=== Accolades ===
| Award | Category | Recipient | Result | Ref. |
|---|---|---|---|---|
| Academy Awards | Best Cinematography | Lajos Koltai | Nominated | |
| Academy Awards | Best Original Score | Ennio Morricone | Nominated | |
| Berlin International Film Festival | Golden Bear | Giuseppe Tornatore | Nominated | |
| British Academy Film Awards | Best Film Not in the English Language | Malèna | Nominated | |
| Cabourg Film Festival | Grand Prix | Giuseppe Tornatore | Won | |
| David di Donatello | Best Cinematography | Lajos Koltai | Won | |
| David di Donatello | Best Music | Ennio Morricone | Nominated | |
| David di Donatello | Best Production Design | Francesco Frigeri | Nominated | |
| David di Donatello | Best Costume Design | Maurizio Millenotti | Nominated | |
| Golden Globe Awards | Best Foreign Language Film | Malèna | Nominated | |
| Golden Globe Awards | Best Original Score | Ennio Morricone | Nominated | |
| Las Vegas Film Critics Society Awards | Best Foreign Film | Malèna | Nominated | |
| Nastro d'Argento | Best Score | Ennio Morricone | Won | |
| Nastro d'Argento | Best Editing | Massimo Quaglia | Nominated | |
| Nastro d'Argento | Best Costume Design | Maurizio Millenotti | Nominated | |
| Nastro d'Argento | Best Production Design | Francesco Frigeri | Nominated | |
| Phoenix Film Critics Society Awards | Best Foreign Language Film | Malèna | Nominated | |
| Satellite Awards | Best Foreign Language Film | Malèna | Nominated | |
| Satellite Awards | Best Original Score | Ennio Morricone | Nominated | |

== Home media ==
Buena Vista Home Entertainment (under the Miramax Home Entertainment banner) released the film on DVD and VHS in several countries during 2001, such as Australia, the United Kingdom and the United States. The US DVD was released on July 19, 2001.

On March 26, 2012, the film received a British Blu-ray release from StudioCanal. The film also received a South Korean Blu-ray release from GreenNarae Media on January 25, 2013, with this company presumably having licensed the film from Filmyard Holdings. In 2011, the film was licensed to streamer Netflix. This streaming deal ran for five years, eventually ending on June 1, 2016.

On September 13, 2022, Paramount Home Entertainment reissued the film on DVD in the US, with this being one of many Miramax titles that they reissued around this time. This issue uses the same artwork as the Buena Vista and Lionsgate US releases, but adds the Paramount mountain logo to the packaging like with all of their other Miramax reissues. Paramount later licensed the film to Australian distributor Imprint, who released it on Blu-ray in the country on June 28, 2023.

The film was made available on Paramount's subscription streaming service Paramount+, in addition to being made available on their free streaming service Pluto TV.
