= Naples in Veils =

2017 film by Ferzan Özpetek

- Theatrical release poster
- Directed by: Ferzan Özpetek
- Written by: Gianni Romoli; Valia Santella; Ferzan Özpetek
- Produced by: Tilde Corsi; Gianni Romoli
- Starring: Giovanna Mezzogiorno; Alessandro Borghi; Anna Bonaiuto; Peppe Barra; Biagio Forestieri; Luisa Ranieri; Maria Pia Calzone; Carmine Recano; Angela Pagano; Maria Luisa Santella; Loredana Cannata; Lina Sastri; Isabella Ferrari
- Cinematography: Gian Filippo Corticelli
- Edited by: Leonardo Alberto Moschetta
- Music by: Pasquale Catalano
- Production companies: Warner Bros. Entertainment Italia, R&C Produzioni, Faros Film
- Distributed by: Warner Bros. Pictures
- Release date: 28 December 2017
- Running time: 113 minutes
- Country: Italy
- Language: Italian
- Box office: $7.2 million

Naples in Veils (Italian: Napoli velata) is a 2017 thriller film directed by Turkish-Italian filmmaker Ferzan Özpetek. The plot is centered around Adriana, a Naples-based medical examiner in her forties who falls for a younger man and spends the night with him at her place.

== Plot ==
During a Neapolitan ceremony involving femminielli at her aunt's house, medical examiner Adriana (Giovanna Mezzogiorno) is seduced by a handsome young man, Andrea (Alessandro Borghi). The two spend a sex-filled night at her place. Andrea asks Adriana to meet again later that afternoon, but he disappoints her by not showing up for the date. The following day, Adriana discovers that the young man on whom she is carrying out a post-mortem examination is Andrea. Someone murdered him and gouged out his eyes. Additionally, Adriana finds out from police inspectors that Andrea had taken pictures of her naked after they had sex. Soon after, she decides to investigate the circumstances surrounding Andrea's mysterious and brutal death. A man who looks exactly like Andrea, however, seems to repeatedly appear around town whenever Adriana is present.

== Cast ==
- Giovanna Mezzogiorno as Adriana / Isabella
- Alessandro Borghi as Andrea Galderisi / Luca
- Anna Bonaiuto as Adele
- Peppe Barra as Pasquale
- Luisa Ranieri as Catena
- Maria Pia Calzone as Rosaria
- Lina Sastri as Ludovica
- Isabella Ferrari as Valeria
- Loredana Cannata as Liliana

== Release ==
The film was released in Italy on 28 December 2017. Its release for Blu-ray and DVD sales took place on 23 April 2019.

== Reception ==
=== Box office ===
Naples in Veils grossed $0 in the United States and Canada and $7.2 million in other territories, plus $609 with home video sales.

=== Critical response ===
On review aggregator Rotten Tomatoes, the film holds an approval rating of 86% based on 7 reviews, with an average rating of 6.7/10.

== See also ==
- Oedipus Rex (Sophocles play)
