= Un bugiardo in paradiso =

- Directed by: Enrico Oldoini
- Written by: Franco Ferrini; Enrico Oldoini
- Starring: Paolo Villaggio; Gabriele Cirilli; Flavio Insinna; Antonella Attili
- Cinematography: Fabrizio Lucci
- Edited by: Raimondo Crociani
- Music by: Manuel De Sica
- Release date: December 4, 1998
- Running time: 100 minutes
- Country: Italy
- Language: Italian

Un bugiardo in paradiso (lit. 'A liar in Heaven') is a 1998 Italian comedy film directed by Enrico Oldoini.

== Cast ==
- Paolo Villaggio as Gino
- Gabriele Cirilli as Tino
- Flavio Insinna as Mino
- Antonella Attili as Teresa
- Mariolina De Fano as Ersilia
- Lars Bloch as Mino's father
- Nathalie Guetta as Agata
- Maria Teresa Battaglia as the butcher's wife
- Salvatore Caruso as Matto
- Fiorenzo Fiorentini as the tramp
- Massimiliano Pazzaglia as Fernando
- Claudio Ricci as Leo
- Annie Depardieu as Zaira
- Giorgio Podo as Piero
- Francesca Perini as Alessia
- Lucilla Diaz as the model
- Anna Scalfi as Martina
- Diletta Ciancio as Damiana
- M.M. Josè Calandra Achde as Tatù
- Renato Mancini as the butcher
