= The Wind, in the Evening =

- Directed by: Andrea Adriatico
- Written by: Stefano Casi; Andrea Adriatico
- Starring: Corso Salani
- Cinematography: Gigi Martinucci
- Music by: Roberto Passuti
- Release date: 2004
- Language: Italian

The Wind, in the Evening (Italian: Il vento, di sera) is a 2004 Italian drama film written and directed by Andrea Adriatico. Loosely inspired by the killing of Marco Biagi, it was screened in the Forum section at the 54th Berlin International Film Festival.

== Cast ==
- Corso Salani as Paolo
- Francesca Mazza as Francesca
- Fabio Valletta as Momo
- Sergio Romano as Marcucci
- Paolo Porto as Barista
- Giovanni Lindo Ferretti as Darts Player
- Alessandro Fullin as Italy
- Ivano Marescotti as Marco

== See also ==
- List of Italian films of 2004
