= Bitter Years =

- Directed by: Andrea Adriatico
- Starring: Nicola Di Benedetto; Sandra Ceccarelli; Antonio Catania
- Release date: 2019
- Country: Italy
- Language: Italian

Bitter Years (originally Gli Anni Amari) is a 2019 biopic of Mario Mieli. It was directed by Andrea Adriatico and released in 2019. It stars Nicola Di Benedetto as Mieli, Sandra Ceccarelli and Antonio Catania.
