= John Madden (director) =

English theatre, film, television, and radio director

- Madden in 2026
- Born: John Philip Madden; 8 April 1949 (age 77); Portsmouth, Hampshire, England
- Education: University of Cambridge
- Years active: 1982–present
- Known for: Director of Shakespeare in Love

John Philip Madden (born 8 April 1949) is an English director of stage, film, television, and radio. He is known for directing the period romantic comedy film Shakespeare in Love (1998), which won the Academy Award for Best Picture at the 71st Academy Awards ceremony.

== Life and career ==
Madden was born in Portsmouth, Hampshire, England. He was educated at Clifton College in Bristol. He was in the same house as Roger Michell, who became a friend and later also a director. He began his career in British independent films, and graduated from Sidney Sussex College, Cambridge in 1970 with a B.A. in English Literature.

He started work in television, including directing Helen Mirren in Prime Suspect 4, episodes of The Adventures of Sherlock Holmes (ITV, 1984–1994), and Inspector Morse (1990–1995).

He directed the film Shakespeare in Love (1998), which won the Academy Award for Best Picture and for which he was also nominated as Best Director. He lost to Steven Spielberg, who directed Saving Private Ryan. The film also won the Silver Bear at the 49th Berlin International Film Festival.

Madden has since directed several films, including Proof (2005), The Best Exotic Marigold Hotel (2011), and its sequel, The Second Best Exotic Marigold Hotel (2015).

Madden is serving as a Jury Member for the digital studio Filmaka, a platform for undiscovered filmmakers to show their work to industry professionals.

== Works ==
=== Film ===
| Year | Title |
|---|---|
| 1987 | A Wreath of Roses |
| 1993 | Ethan Frome |
| 1994 | Golden Gate |
| 1997 | Mrs Brown |
| 1998 | Shakespeare in Love |
| 2001 | Captain Corelli's Mandolin |
| 2005 | Proof |
| 2008 | Killshot |
| 2010 | The Debt |
| 2012 | The Best Exotic Marigold Hotel |
| 2015 | The Second Best Exotic Marigold Hotel |
| 2016 | Miss Sloane |
| 2021 | Operation Mincemeat |
| 2026 | Onwards and Sideways |

=== Television ===
- Poppyland (1984 UK TV film, Screen Two)
- The Adventures of Sherlock Holmes (1986–1991, 2 episodes)
- After the War (1989 UK TV series)
- Inspector Morse (1990–1995, 4 episodes)
- The Widowmaker (1990)
- Prime Suspect 4 (1995)
- Masters of Sex (2013, pilot)

=== Plays ===
Plays he has directed include Arthur Kopit's Wings, and the world premiere in 1980 of Jules Feiffer's Grown Ups at the American Repertory Theatre.

=== Radio ===
Between 1981 and 1996, Madden directed a series of radio adaptations of Star Wars in a BBC/NPR co-production, which included versions of Star Wars Episode IV: A New Hope (1981), The Empire Strikes Back (1983) and Return of the Jedi (1996) scripted for radio by Brian Daley.

Before it was produced for the stage, Madden directed Wings for NPR's Earplay series, in a production that won the Prix Italia.

== Accolades ==
Academy Awards

| Year | Title | Category | Result |
|---|---|---|---|
| 1999 | Shakespeare in Love | Best Director | Nominated |

BAFTA Film Awards

| Year | Title | Category | Result |
|---|---|---|---|
| 1999 | Shakespeare in Love | David Lean Award for Direction | Nominated |
| 2013 | The Best Exotic Marigold Hotel | Outstanding British Film | Nominated |

BAFTA TV Awards

| Year | Title | Category | Result |
|---|---|---|---|
| 1991 | The Widowmaker | Best Single Drama | Nominated |

David di Donatello Awards

| Year | Title | Category | Result |
|---|---|---|---|
| 1999 | Shakespeare in Love | Best Foreign Film | Nominated |

Directors Guild of America Awards

| Year | Title | Category | Result |
|---|---|---|---|
| 1999 | Shakespeare in Love | Outstanding Directing - Feature Film | Nominated |

Golden Globe Awards

| Year | Title | Category | Result |
|---|---|---|---|
| 1999 | Shakespeare in Love | Best Director - Motion Picture | Nominated |

Accolades for Madden's films
| Year | Motion Picture | Academy Awards | | BAFTAs | | Golden Globes | |
| Year | Motion Picture | Nominations | Wins | Nominations | Wins | Nominations | Wins |
|---|---|---|---|---|---|---|---|
| 1990 | The Widowmaker | | | 1 | | | |
| 1997 | Mrs Brown | 2 | | 8 | 2 | 1 | 1 |
| 1998 | Shakespeare in Love | 13 | 7 | 15 | 4 | 6 | 3 |
| 2005 | Proof | | | | | 1 | |
| 2011 | The Best Exotic Marigold Hotel | | | 1 | | 2 | |
| 2016 | Miss Sloane | | | | | 1 | |
| Total | | 15 | 7 | 25 | 6 | 11 | 4 |
