= Incantato =

2003 Italian drama film

- Film poster
- Directed by: Pupi Avati
- Written by: Pupi Avati
- Produced by: Antonio Avati
- Starring: Neri Marcorè
- Cinematography: Pasquale Rachini
- Edited by: Amedeo Salfa
- Music by: Riz Ortolani
- Release date: 24 January 2003
- Running time: 107 minutes
- Country: Italy
- Language: Italian

Incantato (Italian: Il cuore altrove, also known as The Heart Is Elsewhere or The Heart Is Everywhere) is a 2003 Italian drama film directed by Pupi Avati. It was entered into the 2003 Cannes Film Festival.

== Cast ==
- Neri Marcorè as Nello Balocchi
- Vanessa Incontrada as Angela
- Giancarlo Giannini as Cesare, Nello's father
- Nino D'Angelo as Domenico, a hairdresser
- Sandra Milo as Arabella, owner of a boarding house
- Giulio Bosetti as Doctor Gardini, Angela's father
- Edoardo Romano as Professor Gibertoni
- Anna Longhi as Lina, Nello's mother
- Chiara Sani as Jole, Domenico's girlfriend
- Alfiero Toppetti as Renato
- Rita Carlini as Emanuela, manicurist
- Bob Messini
- Pietro Ragusa as Guido Beccalis
