= Facing Windows =

Facing Windows (La finestra di fronte)
- Directed by: Ferzan Özpetek
- Written by: Ferzan Özpetek; Gianni Romoli
- Produced by: Tilde Corsi; Gianni Romoli
- Starring: Giovanna Mezzogiorno; Massimo Girotti; Raoul Bova; Filippo Nigro
- Music by: Andrea Guerra
- Distributed by: Sony Pictures Classics
- Release date: 28 February 2003
- Running time: 102 minutes
- Country: Italy
- Language: Italian

Facing Windows (Italian: La finestra di fronte) is a 2003 Italian romantic drama film directed by Ferzan Özpetek.

== Plot ==
Giovanna (Giovanna Mezzogiorno) and her husband Filippo (Filippo Nigro) have settled into life. They both have jobs that make them unhappy. She works in a poultry factory. He works the graveyard shift because he lacks seniority. They argue about money, sex, time and work... There is a subtle sense that this is a marriage whose love is dwindling fast, and that perhaps they are only going through the motions for the sake of their children.

One morning, the two of them are walking home and cross paths with an elderly man (Massimo Girotti). He is suffering from transient global amnesia, remembering nothing about himself and his current situation, although recalling random episodes from his remote past. And despite Giovanna's protests, Filippo brings him back to their home for the night so that he can take him to the police the next morning in the hopes of unraveling the mystery. As complications ensue, that one night stretches to a few days. The old man experiences strange episodes, flashbacks of sorts, that reveal clues to his mysterious past. His actions lead to a meeting between Giovanna and Lorenzo (Raoul Bova). Lorenzo lives across the street from Giovanna and their apartment windows face each other. The sexual tension between the two is quite palpable as they have both been secretly watching and lusting after each other from their dimly lit windows.

Giovanna and Lorenzo's instant friendship swiftly moves to flirtation and then to a passionate kiss. However, Lorenzo's job is transferring him to another city very soon and Giovanna is put in an awkward spot having to make a very quick decision. Her heart tells her she should act on her feelings. Her mind tells her to be responsible. Nevertheless, the two of them puzzle over the mystery of the old man as they try to come to terms with their feelings for one another.

The only thing the old man seems to remember is the name Simone, so Giovanna and her family take to calling him this. Giovanna takes Simone's suit to be cleaned and discovers a love letter in the jacket pocket addressed to him from a certain Davide Veroli. The next morning, Simone disappears, so Giovanna sets out to trace Davide Veroli as a means of identifying Simone and at this point also of tracing him. A meeting is arranged between them.

When Giovanna comes face to face with the old Davide Veroli, it turns out he is the old man they called Simone. Simone, in fact, had been the man Davide had loved when he was young. Davide heard the Nazis were going to kill all Jews in Rome and killed his boss in order to escape and to alert as many people as possible. However, Davide was in a crossroad: he had to choose between telling the others – his neighbors, those who had laughed at him for being homosexual – or looking for Simone first instead. He chose to save the others in the first place to prove that he deserved their respect and saved many people and children. He was given many honors after this, but he lost his only love.

After remembering who he was, he had gone back home, although without mentioning anything to the family that had given him a roof the previous days. Nonetheless, they became very good friends. Davide helped her make some big decisions in her life, like pursuing her dream to work in a bakery and having the strength to fight for her marriage and her children.

== Cast ==
- Giovanna Mezzogiorno as Giovanna
- Massimo Girotti as Simone / Davide Veroli
- Raoul Bova as Lorenzo
- Filippo Nigro as Filippo
- Serra Yilmaz as Eminè
- Maria Grazia Bon as Sara
- Massimo Poggio as Young Davide
- Ivan Bacchi as Simone

Others;

- Veronica Bruni as Tintora
- Olimpia Carlisi as Donna negozio stoffe
- Ohame-Brancy Chibuzo (billed as Ohame Brancy Chibuzo) as Alessio
- Carlo Daniele as Marco
- Rosaria De Cicco as Barista
- Lucianna De Falco as Marilena
- Benedetta Gargari as Martina

== Reception ==
On Rotten Tomatoes, the film holds a score of 64% based on 66 reviews.

In 2004, Kevin Lally of Film Journal International said of that it "is a fine showcase for a rising star of Italian cinema, Giovanna Mezzogiorno and a final salute to an Italian veteran, Massimo Girotti". He also stated the film has a "puzzle-like narrative, is consistently involving" and director Ferzan Ozpetek's screenplay will gain him a "wider art-house following".

== Awards ==
- Won 4 David di Donatello Awards: (Best Actor: Massimo Girotti - Best Actress: Giovanna Mezzogiorno - Best Film: Gianni Romoli, Tilde Corsi and Ferzan Özpetek - Best Music: Andrea Guerra)
- Won 3 Nastro d'Argento Prizes: (Best Actress: Giovanna Mezzogiorno - Best Original Story: Gianni Romoli and Ferzan Özpetek - Best Song: Giorgia for the song Gocce di memoria)
- Won the Crystal Globe and the Best Director Award for Ferzan Özpetek at the 38th Karlovy Vary International Film Festival.
- Won the Golden Space Needle Award at the Seattle International Film Festival
