= The Coast Guard (film) =

- The Coast Guard movie poster
- Hangul: 해안선
- Lit.: Coastlinea
- RR: Haeanseon
- MR: Haeansŏn
- Directed by: Kim Ki-duk
- Written by: Kim Ki-duk
- Produced by: Kim Dong-joo; Lee Seung-jae
- Starring: Jang Dong-gun; Park Ji-a
- Cinematography: Baek Dong-hyeon
- Edited by: Kim Sun-min
- Distributed by: Korea Pictures; Cineclick Asia
- Release date: November 22, 2002
- Running time: 94 minutes
- Country: South Korea
- Language: Korean
- Budget: US$1 million
- Box office: US$2,440,549

The Coast Guard (Korean: 해안선; RR: Haeanseon; lit. 'Coastline') is a 2002 South Korean film directed by Kim Ki-duk. The film deals with military atrocities and the absurdities of borders and conflicts.

== Plot ==
In June 2002, Private Kang is a South Korean marine guarding the South Korean coastline near the Korean Demilitarized Zone, overly eager to shoot a North Korean infiltrator during his time on duty. On one dimly-lit night, a drunk local couple sneaks into the fenced-off demilitarized zone to have sex. Kang spots the male half, whom he had quarreled with previously in town, on his low-resolution night-vision scope, and mistaking him for a North Korean spy, kills him with his rifle and grenades.

Kang and the girlfriend of the dead civilian both have mental breakdowns.

The woman believes the members of Kang's unit are her dead lover, and engages in sexual affairs with them. She eventually becomes pregnant and is forced into a botched abortion by the unit's incompetent medics. The woman's brother, enraged, attempts to stab members of the unit but is subdued and arrested by local policemen.

Kang is commended for his action and is granted leave as a reward, during which he shows signs of post-traumatic stress disorder. His friends consequently ostracize him and his girlfriend leaves him. Upon return to his post, he is cornered and beaten by the dead civilian's friends, and his PTSD worsens. After several episodes, the military deems Kang mentally unfit for service and honorably discharges him. Kang refuses to leave, and after several failed attempts to return to service, resorts to stealing military equipment and killing members of his unit.

He then goes to Myeongdong in Seoul, where he stabs people at random with his bayonet before being confronted by armed policemen. Gunfire then erupts.

== Cast ==
- Jang Dong-gun as Private Kang
- Kim Jung-hak as Private Kim
- Park Ji-a as Mi-young
- Yoo Hae-jin as Cheol-gu
- Jeong Jin as So Cho-jang
- Kim Ku-taek as Sergeant Jang
- Kim Kang-woo as Private Jo
- Park Yoon-jae as Private Yoon
- Kim Tae-woo as Private Seo
- Kim Young-jae as medic
- Kim Mi-sung as tourist woman #1
- In-seong as agent 2
- No Jun-ho as man stabbed with bayonet
- Won Deok-hyun as kid
- Shim Hoon-ki as coast guard 2
- Jung Hee-tae as agent 7
- Jeon Sung-ae as Young-kil's mother
- Park Sung-il as Private Kang's friend
- Choi Min as provost

== Production ==
Filming took place around Jeonju and Seoul, South Korea over a month from June 18, 2002 to July 19, 2002, mostly in chronological order. The actors playing the marines went through a week-long mini-boot camp to help them get acclimated to playing the roles of South Korean marines, the director himself a veteran of the South Korean marine corps. One day of filming was interrupted so the cast and crew could watch the 2002 FIFA World Cup quarterfinals between South Korea and Spain, held on June 22, 2002.

== Awards ==
=== Wins ===
38th Karlovy Vary International Film Festival 2003:

- FIPRESCI International Critics Award: "For the strong and innovative depiction of the illusion of power which destroys humanity on both sides of the fence."
- NETPAC Award
- Town of Karlovy Vary Award

=== Nominations ===
38th Karlovy Vary International Film Festival 2003:

- Crystal Globe
