= The Last Kiss (2001 film) =

2001 Italian comedy-drama film by Gabriele Muccino

- Theatrical release poster
- L'ultimo bacio (Italian)
- Directed by: Gabriele Muccino
- Written by: Gabriele Muccino
- Produced by: Domenico Procacci
- Starring: Stefano Accorsi; Giovanna Mezzogiorno; Stefania Sandrelli
- Cinematography: Marcello Montarsi
- Edited by: Claudio Di Mauro
- Music by: Paolo Buonvino
- Production companies: Fandango; Medusa Film
- Distributed by: Medusa Film
- Release dates: 3 February 2001 (Italy); 16 August 2002 (USA)
- Running time: 115 minutes
- Language: Italian
- Box office: $17.7 million

The Last Kiss (Italian: L'ultimo bacio [ˈlultimo ˈbaːtʃo]) is a 2001 Italian comedy-drama film written and directed by Gabriele Muccino.

It was remade into The Last Kiss in 2006 by Tony Goldwyn starring Zach Braff and Rachel Bilson.

A sequel to the film (Italian: Baciami ancora; English: Kiss me again) was released in Italy in February 2010.

== Plot ==
Giulia and Carlo have been happy together for three years, but Giulia's announcement that she is pregnant sends him into a secret panic. Terrified at his imminent entry into the adult world of irreversible responsibilities, Carlo finds himself tempted by a bewitching 18-year-old girl, Francesca, whom he meets by chance at a wedding. The possibility of one last youthful crazy fling before the impending prison of parenthood proves to be too attractive to resist.

But a short-term fling with Francesca comes with serious consequences that threaten to damage his three-year relationship with Giulia, who is expecting a baby girl. At the same time, it also dashes the idealistic hopes of Francesca, who dreams of a beautiful future with him. After a raucous quarrel in the night, Carlo goes to Francesca's house, where they have sex. However, the morning after, reality sinks on Carlo and the enormity of what he had done surfaces. But it is not easy for Giulia to forgive, or to trust him again.

== Cast ==
- Giovanna Mezzogiorno as Giulia
- Stefano Accorsi as Carlo
- Stefania Sandrelli as Anna
- Martina Stella as Francesca
- Pierfrancesco Favino as Marco
- Claudio Santamaria as Paolo
- Sabrina Impacciatore as Livia
- Giorgio Pasotti as Adriano
- Sergio Castellitto as Prof. Eugenio Bonetti
- Regina Orioli as Arianna
- Marco Cocci as Alberto
- Luigi Diberti as Emilio
- Daniela Piazza as Veronica
- Lina Bernardi as Adele
- Piero Natoli as Michele
- Vittorio Amandola as Mimmo
- Giulia Carmignani as Mariposa
- Silvio Muccino as fiancée of Mariposa
- Carmen Consoli as lover of Alberto

== Reception ==
The film grossed $12 million in Italy and $17.8 million worldwide.

=== Awards ===
| Award | Category | Recipient(s) | Result | Ref. |
|---|---|---|---|---|
| David di Donatello | Best Director | Gabriele Muccino | Won | |
| David di Donatello | Best Supporting Actress | Stefania Sandrelli | Won | |
| David di Donatello | Best Producer | Domenico Procacci | Won | |
| David di Donatello | Best Editing | Claudio Di Mauro | Won | |
| David di Donatello | Best Sound | Gaetano Carito | Won | |
| David di Donatello | Best Film | | Nominated | |
| David di Donatello | Best Actress | Giovanna Mezzogiorno | Nominated | |
| David di Donatello | Best Actor | Stefano Accorsi | Nominated | |
| David di Donatello | Best Supporting Actor | Claudio Santamaria | Nominated | |
| David di Donatello | Best Screenplay | Gabriele Muccino | Nominated | |
| Nastro d'Argento | Best Supporting Actress | Stefania Sandrelli | Won | |
| Nastro d'Argento | Best Editing | Claudio Di Mauro | Won | |
| Nastro d'Argento | Best Original Song | Carmen Consoli – L'ultimo bacio | Won | |
| Nastro d'Argento | Best Director | Gabriele Muccino | Nominated | |
| Nastro d'Argento | Best Actress | Giovanna Mezzogiorno | Nominated | |
| Nastro d'Argento | Best Supporting Actress | Sabrina Impacciatore | Nominated | |
| Nastro d'Argento | Best Producer | Domenico Procacci | Nominated | |
| European Film Awards | Best Actress | Stefania Sandrelli | Nominated | |
| Sundance Film Festival | World Cinema Audience Award | Gabriele Muccino | Won | |
| Ciak d'oro | Best Actor | Stefano Accorsi | Won | |
| Ciak d'oro | Best Screenplay | Gabriele Muccino | Won | |
| Ciak d'oro | Best Editing | Claudio Di Mauro | Won | |
