= Corso Salani =

Italian director, screenwriter and actor

Corso Salani

Corso Salani (9 September 1961, in Florence – 16 June 2010, in Ostia) was an Italian director, screenwriter and actor.

The cause of his death was a sudden illness while walking along the seafront in Ostia with his wife Margaret.

== Filmography ==
=== As actor ===
- The Week of the Sphinx (1990)
- The Invisible Wall (1991)
- Nel Continente nero (1992)
- The End is Known (1992)
- The Wind, in the Evening (2004)
- Piano, solo (2007)
- The Rage (2008)
- Black Sea (2008)
- Il mostro di Firenze (2009)
- Dark Love (2010)

=== As director ===
- Mirna (2009)
- Il peggio di noi (2006)
- Corrispondenze private (2003)
- Occidente (2000)
- Gli occhi stanchi (1995)
- Gli ultimi giorni (1992)
- Voci d'Europa (1989)

=== As Writer ===
- Il peggio di noi (2006)
- Corrispondenze private (2003)
- Occidente (2000)
- Gli ultimi giorni (1992)
- Voci d'Europa (1989)
