= The Bride's Journey =

- Directed by: Sergio Rubini
- Written by: Filippo Ascione; Umberto Marino; Raffaele Nigro; Sergio Rubini
- Produced by: Vittorio Cecchi Gori
- Starring: Sergio Rubini; Giovanna Mezzogiorno
- Cinematography: Italo Petriccione
- Music by: Germano Mazzocchetti
- Release date: 1997
- Running time: 104 min
- Country: Italy
- Language: Italian

The Bride's Journey (Italian: Il viaggio della sposa) is a 1997 Italian comedy drama film written, directed and starred by Sergio Rubini.

== Plot ==
In the 16th century, in Abruzzo, the noblewoman Porzia Colonna is promised as a bride to a nobleman of the Orsini family of Conversano, near Bari. Porzia must be escorted from the convent of Atri, where she was educated, to Conversano. During the journey, a band of brigands attacks her party, and most of those travelling with her are killed. The only survivors are Porzia and a rough fellow named Bartolo, who decide to continue the journey to Apulia on foot, although they are so different that they are distrustful of each other. They travel together for two months, meeting many adventures along the way. For the young lady, who has known life only out of books, this is a meeting with hard reality. Bartolo has to teach her the difficult ways of real life. In turn, Porzia teaches him to read and write and to respect learning. Despite their differences, or perhaps by the attraction of opposites, they fall in love, but Bartolo sees their backgrounds as an insurmountable barrier. When they finally arrive at Conversano, he leaves Porzia there and sets off to go home. She is in tears, running behind him, after telling him she loves him.

Many years later, Bartolo, now an elderly schoolteacher, receives a letter from Porzia, who has quietly followed the events of his life. From her death bed, she thanks him for their time together and says she always went on loving him, sending him a diary telling the story of their love and adventures. Bartolo is in tears on hearing Porzia has died. He goes on teaching a mixed class. A child repeats the first of Bartolo's mistakes that Porzia corrected: "Do it! Do not do it!"

== Cast ==
- Sergio Rubini: Bartolo
- Giovanna Mezzogiorno: Porzia Colonna
- Franco Iavarone: Antuono
- Carlo Mucari: Captain Palagano
- Umberto Orsini: Don Diego

== See also ==
- List of Italian films of 1997
