= Fabio Cianchetti =

Italian cinematographer

- Born: 22 April 1952 (age 74); Bergamo, Lombardy, Italy
- Occupation: Cinematographer
- Years active: 1983–present

Fabio Cianchetti (born 22 April 1952) is an Italian cinematographer. He contributed to more than seventy films since 1983, including The Tiger and the Snow, The Beast in the Heart and The Dreamers.

== Awards ==
- David di Donatello for Best Cinematography (2000)
