= The Way We Laughed =

- Directed by: Gianni Amelio
- Written by: Gianni Amelio; Daniele Gaglianone; Lillo Iacolino; Alberto Taraglio
- Starring: Enrico Lo Verso; Francesco Giuffrida
- Cinematography: Luca Bigazzi
- Music by: Franco Piersanti
- Distributed by: Cecchi Gori Group (Italy); Summit Entertainment (International)
- Release dates: 10 September 1998 (Venice); 2 October 1998 (Italy); 21 November 2001 (U.S.)
- Running time: 124 minutes
- Country: Italy
- Language: Italian

The Way We Laughed (Italian: Così ridevano) is a 1998 Italian drama film directed by Gianni Amelio. It tells the story of two Sicilian brothers, Giovanni and Pietro, who emigrate to the city of Turin. Giovanni works hard to help Pietro study to be a teacher, but Pietro does poorly. Then Pietro disappears.

The film won the Golden Lion at the 55th Venice International Film Festival.

== Cast ==
- Enrico Lo Verso as Giovanni
- Fabrizio Gifuni as Pelaia
- Francesco Giuffrida as Pietro
- Rosaria Danzè as Lucia
- Renato Liprandi as the professor
- Paolo Sena as Prof.Rosini
