= Giovanna Mezzogiorno =

Italian actress

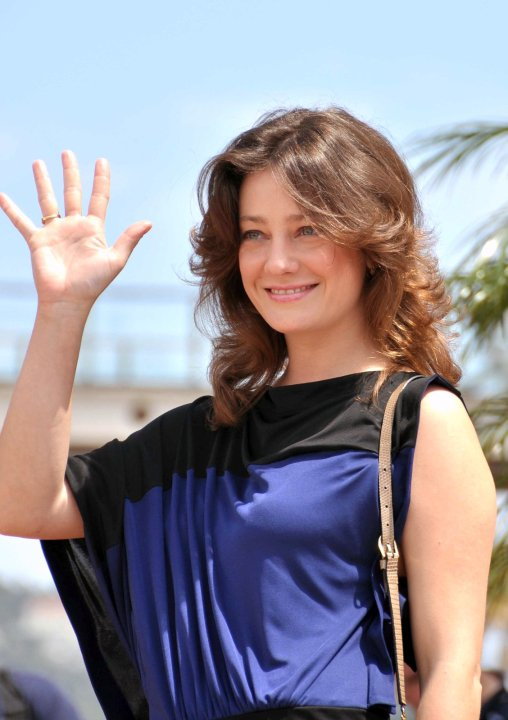
- Mezzogiorno at the 2010 Cannes Film Festival
- Born: 9 November 1974 (age 51); Rome, Italy
- Occupation: Actress
- Children: 2
- Parent: Vittorio Mezzogiorno

Giovanna Mezzogiorno (Italian pronunciation: [dʒoˈvanna ˌmɛddzoˈdʒorno]; born 9 November 1974) is an Italian actress.

== Early life ==
Mezzogiorno was born in Rome, 9 November 1974, a daughter of actors Vittorio Mezzogiorno and Cecilia Sacchi. She grew up watching her parents on set. At first, she wanted to become a ballerina, and studied dancing for 13 years. After her father's death when she was 19, Mezzogiorno moved to Paris, where she attended the stages by Ariane Mnouchkine and worked for two years at the Peter Brook Workshop.

== Career ==
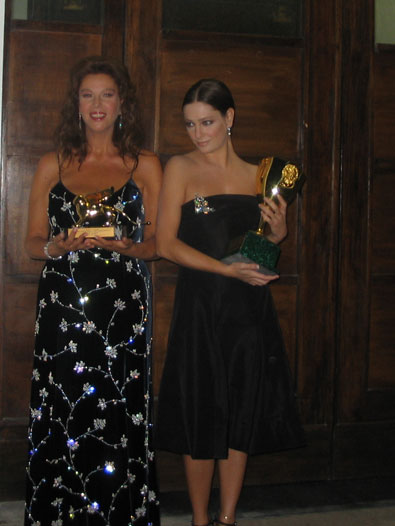
Mezzogiorno (right) along with Stefania Sandrelli shows off her Coppa Volpi

Mezzogiorno made her stage debut with the role of Ofelia in Qui est là, based on Shakespeare's Hamlet. The play toured various European cities. She received the Premio Coppola-Prati 1996, the jury was presided over by theatre critic Franco Quadri. One year later, she made her film debut in Il viaggio della sposa (The Bride's Journey), written by and starring Sergio Rubini. Mezzogiorno was awarded the Targa d'Argento as the New Talent in Italian Cinema, she was also given the Grolla d'oro, and the Globo d'Oro by the Foreign Press Association and the Premio Flaiano as Best Actress of the 1997 - 1998 season.

In 1998, Mezzogiorno starred in the film Del perduto amore directed by Michele Placido, with Fabrizio Bentivoglio and Sergio Rubini (she was awarded the Nastro d'Argento, the Ciak d'Oro and Premio Pasinetti as best actress in a starring role) and, for the Italian National Television Network RaiDue, in a film made-for-TV Più leggero non basta ("A lighter burden to bear") in the role of a young girl with muscular dystrophy, directed by Elisabetta Lodoli with Stefano Accorsi.

In 1999, Mezzogiorno played the role of Silvia, daughter of Enzo Tortora by whose mistaken conviction the film was inspired. The film Un uomo perbene with Michele Placido and Mariangela Melato, was directed by Maurizio Zaccaro. In that same year, she worked in Asini, directed by Antonello Grimaldi, with celebrated Italian comedian Claudio Bisio.

In 2000, she travelled between Prague and Paris for work in the TV miniseries Les Miserables, directed by Josée Dayan, with Gérard Depardieu and John Malkovich. She worked in Denmark in Nobel, directed by Fabio Carpi, with Héctor Alterio. In Italy, she worked with Puglielli in Tutta la conoscenza del mondo ("All There Is to Know"), and then, L'ultimo bacio ("The Last Kiss") directed by Gabriele Muccino with Stefano Accorsi and Stefania Sandrelli (winning the Premio Flaiano). With the success of this last movie Giovanna become really famous in Italy.

In 2001, Mezzogiorno appeared in the film Malefemmene with Ángela Molina and directed by Fabio Conversi, in the role of Francesca, who was imprisoned following a judicial error and came into contact with the reality of friendship and attachment which she had never imagined possible. She also worked on Stai con me, with Adriano Giannini and directed by Livia Giampalmo, in the role of a mother of twins.

In 2002, she worked on the set of Ilaria Alpi - Il più crudele dei giorni, in the role of the protagonist, directed by Ferdinando Vicentini Orgnani (the film tells the tragic and dark story of the Italian TV journalist killed in Mogadiscio). She also starred in France in the Holocaust-period TV drama Entrusted, directed by Giacomo Battiato, with Klaus Maria Brandauer, Thomas Brodie-Sangster and Steven Moyer, based on Loup Duran's best-seller. In Italy, she starred in the film La finestra di fronte ("Facing windows") directed by Ferzan Özpetek, costarring Massimo Girotti and Raoul Bova. This film, critically acclaimed and a box office success, earned her a lot of awards: the David di Donatello, the Ciak d’Oro, the Nastro d'Argento, the Globo d'oro by the Foreign Press, the Flaiano Award, the Karlovy Vary Award as "Best Actress in a Leading Role".

Mezzogiorno starred in the film L’amore ritorna, directed by Sergio Rubini, costarring Fabrizio Bentivoglio and Margherita Buy. She also worked in France, on the set of her first comedy: Au secours, j'ai 30 ans, directed by Marie-Anne Chazel, with Pierre Palmade.

In 2004, Mezzogiorno worked in the TV movie Virginia (La monaca di Monza), directed by Alberto Sironi. She then returned to the theatre, working with the director Piero Maccarinelli in 4.48 Psicosi, written by Sarah Kane.

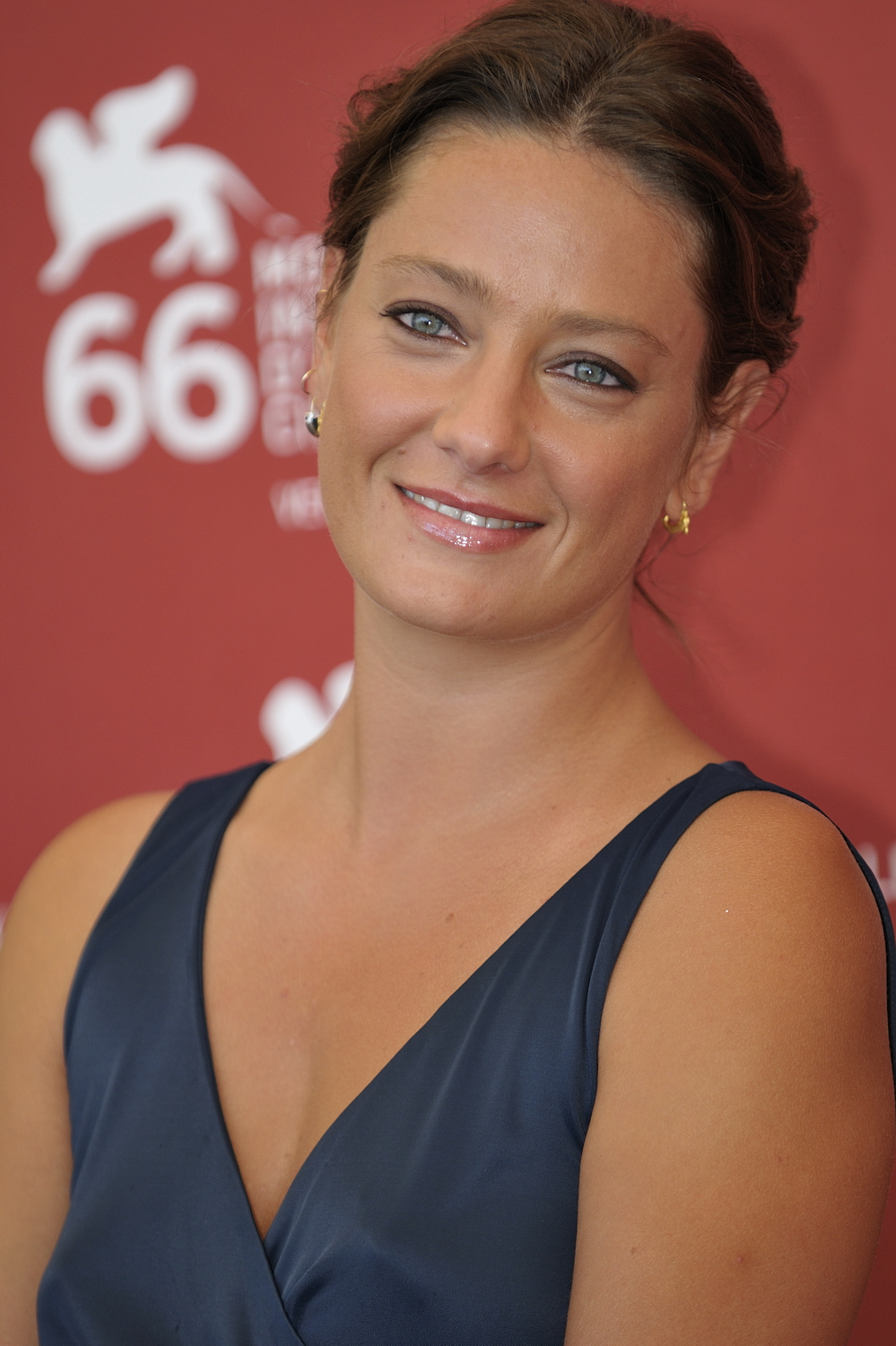
Mezzogiorno at the Venice Film Festival 2009.

In 2005, La bestia nel cuore ("Don't Tell"), directed by Cristina Comencini, was an Academy Award candidate for Best Foreign Language Film, earning Mezzogiorno one of the most important international prizes for an actress: the Coppa Volpi, previously won by Shirley MacLaine, Gong Li, Isabelle Huppert, Catherine Deneuve and Sophia Loren.

In 2006, Mezzogiorno acted in AD Project, a sci-fi thriller by Eros Puglielli, and acted in "Lezioni di Volo" ("Flying Lessons") by Francesca Archibugi.

In 2007, she appeared as Leila, a sexy thief, in the black comedy Notturno Bus ("Night Bus"), directed by Davide Marengo and starring Valerio Mastandrea and Ennio Fantastichini.

She travelled to Colombia to become Fermina Daza, the principal female character from Love in the Time of Cholera based on the book written by Nobel Prize winner Gabriel García Márquez and directed by Mike Newell (Four Weddings and a Funeral).

After appearing in two films shot in 2008, Sono Viva and Palermo Shooting by Wim Wenders, in 2009 she achieved great international success with Vincere by Marco Bellocchio, selected for the official competition in Cannes and a solid candidate for the final award.

Mezzogiorno narrated and produced a documentary to celebrate the career of her father Vittorio, 15 years after his sudden death in 1994.

She was a member of the jury at the Cannes Film Festival in May 2010. In January 2011, she was rewarded with the National Society of Film Critics Award for Best Actress 2010 for her role in Vincere.

In 2017, Mezzogiorno appeared in the role of Adriana in the film called Napoli velata (Naples in Veils).

== Personal life ==
On the set of the film Lighter is not Enough (1998) she met Stefano Accorsi, who became her long-time partner. On the set of Vincere she met the driver Alessio Fugolo, whom she married in 2009 in Griante in a civil ceremony. She has two sons, Leone and Zeno, born 26 August 2011.

== Filmography ==
=== Film ===
Year	Title	Role	Notes
1997	The Bride's Journey	Porzia Colonna	
1998	Of Lost Love	Liliana	
1999	A Respectable Man	Silvia Tortora	
1999	Asini	Anna	
2001	The Last Kiss	Giulia	
2001	All There Is to Know	Giovanna	
2001	Nobel	Eleonora	
2001	Bad Women	Francesca	
2003	Facing Windows	Giovanna	
2003	The Cruelest Day	Ilaria Alpi	
2004	Stay with Me	Chiara	
2004	Au secours, j'ai 30 ans!	Kathy	
2004	Love Returns	Lena	
2005	Don't Tell	Sabina	
2006	AD Project	Gaia	
2007	Flying Lessons	Chiara Della Notte	
2007	Night Bus	Leila Ronchi	
2007	Love in the Time of Cholera	Fermina Daza	
2008	L'amore non basta	Martina	
2008	Les Murs porteurs	Manou	
2008	Palermo Shooting	Flavia	
2008	Sono viva	Stefania	
2009	Vincere	Ida Dalser	
2009	The Front Line	Susanna Ronconi	
2009	Negli occhi	Narrator	Documentary; also producer
2010	Basilicata Coast to Coast	Tropea Limongi	
2013	ReWined	Adele	
2014	The Dinner	Chiara	
2016	The Jungle Book	Kaa (voice)	Italian dub
2016	How to Grow Up Despite Your Parents	Mary Riley	
2017	Tenderness	Elena	
2017	Naples in Veils	Adriana / Isabella	
2019	Tornare	Alice McNellis	
2020	Alida	Narrator	Documentary
2020	The Ties	Adult Anna	
2020	The Time of Indifference	Lisa	
2022	Educazione fisica	Principal Diana Peruggia	
2022	Amanda	Viola	
2026	Sotto a chi tocca †	TBA	Post-production
2026	Se ami qualcuno dillo †	TBA	Post-production

=== Television ===
Year	Title	Role	Notes
1998	Più leggero non basta	Elena Ballarini	Television movie
2000	Les Misérables	Soeur Simplice	4 episodes
2003	Il segreto di Thomas	Maria von Gall	Television movie
2004	Virginia, la monaca di Monza	Virginia de Leyva, the Nun of Monza	Two-parts television movie
2017	In Treatment	Adele	35 episodes
2019	La Compagnia del Cigno	Valeria Trani	2 episodes
2019	Io ricordo, Piazza Fontana	Francesca Dendena	Television movie
2026	Motorvalley	Arianna	6 episodes

== Awards and nominations ==
Award	Year	Category	Nominated work	Result
55th Venice International Film Festival	1998	"Pasinetti" Award	Of Lost Love	Won
62nd Venice International Film Festival	2005	Volpi Cup for Best Actress	Don't Tell	Won
Bangkok International Film Festival	2003	Best Actress	Facing Windows	Won
Ciak d'Oro	1999	Best Actress	Of Lost Love	Won
Ciak d'Oro	2003	Best Actress	Facing Windows	Won
Ciak d'Oro	2020	Best Actress	Tornare	Nominated
David di Donatello	1999	Best Actress	Of Lost Love	Nominated
David di Donatello	2001	Best Actress	The Last Kiss	Nominated
David di Donatello	2003	Best Actress	Facing Windows	Won
David di Donatello	2005	Best Supporting Actress	Love Returns	Nominated
David di Donatello	2006	Best Actress	Don't Tell	Nominated
David di Donatello	2007	Best Actress	Flying Lessons	Nominated
David di Donatello	2010	Best Actress	Vincere	Nominated
David di Donatello	2018	Best Actress	Naples in Veils	Nominated
David di Donatello	2023	Best Supporting Actress	Amanda	Nominated
European Film Awards	2003	Best Actress (Audience Award)	Facing Windows	Nominated
Flaiano Award	2001	Best Actress	The Last Kiss	Won
Flaiano Award	2003	Best Actress	Facing Windows	Won
Globo d'Oro	1998	Best Breakthrough Actress	The Bride's Journey	Won
Globo d'Oro	2001	Best Actress	The Last Kiss	Nominated
Globo d'Oro	2003	Best Actress	Facing Windows	Won
Globo d'Oro	2009	Best Actress	Vincere	Won
Globo d'Oro	2010	Best Actress	The Front Line	Nominated
Golden Graals	2006	Best Actress – Drama	Don't Tell	Nominated
Karlovy Vary International Film Festival	2003	Best Actress	Facing Windows	Won
Moscow International Film Festival	2018	Best Actress	Naples in Veils	Won
Nastro d'Argento	1998	Best Actress	The Bride's Journey	Nominated
Nastro d'Argento	1999	Best Actress	Of Lost Love	Won
Nastro d'Argento	2001	Best Actress	The Last Kiss	Nominated
Nastro d'Argento	2003	Best Actress	Facing Windows	Won
Nastro d'Argento	2005	Best Supporting Actress	Love Returns	Won
Nastro d'Argento	2006	Best Actress	Don't Tell	Nominated
Nastro d'Argento	2007	Best Actress	Flying Lessons	Nominated
Nastro d'Argento	2009	Best Actress	Vincere	Won
Nastro d'Argento	2017	Best Actress	Tenderness	Nominated
Nastro d'Argento	2018	Best Actress	Naples in Veils	Nominated
Nastro d'Argento	2020	Best Actress	Tornare	Nominated
National Society of Film Critics	2010	Best Actress	Vincere	Won
