= Of Lost Love =

- Directed by: Michele Placido
- Written by: Domenico Starnone; Michele Placido
- Cinematography: Blasco Giurato
- Music by: Carlo Crivelli
- Distributed by: Compagnia Distribuzione Internazionale; Buena Vista International
- Release date: 1998

Of Lost Love (Italian: Del perduto amore) is a 1998 Italian drama film directed by Michele Placido. For her performance Giovanna Mezzogiorno won the Pasinetti Award at the 55th Venice International Film Festival and the 1999 Nastro d'Argento for Best Actress, while her co-star Fabrizio Bentivoglio was awarded David di Donatello for Best Supporting Actor. The Mezzogiorno's character is inspired by teacher Liliana Rossi.

== Plot ==
In the 1950s a young teacher, close to the ideals of the left, tries to help the most vulnerable people through teaching.

== Cast ==
- Giovanna Mezzogiorno: Liliana
- Fabrizio Bentivoglio: Antonio
- Rocco Papaleo: Cucchiaro
- Michele Placido: Don Gerardo
- Enrico Lo Verso: Dr. Satriano
- Pietro Pischedda: Gerardo
- Sergio Rubini: Italo
