= Next Stop Paradise (1998 film) =

- Directed by: Lucian Pintilie
- Written by: Lucian Pintilie
- Starring: Costel Cascaval
- Release date: 9 September 1998 (Venice)
- Running time: 99 minutes
- Country: Romania
- Language: Romanian

Next Stop Paradise (Romanian: Terminus Paradis) is a 1998 Romanian film directed by Lucian Pintilie. It was entered into the 55th Venice International Film Festival. The film was selected as the Romanian entry for the Best Foreign Language Film at the 71st Academy Awards, but was not accepted as a nominee.

== Cast ==
- Costel Cascaval as Mitu
- Dorina Chiriac as Norica
- Gheorghe Visu as Vatasescu
- Victor Rebengiuc as Grigore Cafanu
- Razvan Vasilescu as Capt. Burcea
- Gabriel Spahiu as Nelu
- Dan Tudor
- Doru Ana as Gili

== See also ==
- List of submissions to the 71st Academy Awards for Best Foreign Language Film
- List of Romanian submissions for the Academy Award for Best Foreign Language Film
