= Marco Onorato =

Italian cinematographer

- Born: 18 May 1953; Rome, Italy
- Died: 2 June 2012 (aged 59); Rome, Italy
- Occupation: Cinematographer
- Relatives: Glauco Onorato (brother); Maria Virginia Onorato (sister)

Marco Onorato (18 May 1953 – 2 June 2012) was an Italian cinematographer.

== Biography ==
He is best known for being the cinematographer of all of Matteo Garrone's movies till his death. He won the European Film Award for Best Cinematographer for Gomorrah and he won a posthumous David di Donatello Award for Best Cinematography for his work in Reality after being nominated for The Embalmer, First Love and Gomorrah.

He was the brother of actor and dubber Glauco Onorato. He died on June 2, 2012, at the age of 59, after a short illness.

== Selected filmography ==
- I ragazzi di via Panisperna (1989)
- There Was a Castle with Forty Dogs (1990)
- Terra di mezzo (1996)
- Ospiti (1998)
- The Embalmer (2002)
- First Love (2004)
- The Voyage Home (2004)
- Gomorrah (2008)
- Fort Apache Napoli (2009)
- Reality (2012)
- Cha cha cha (2013)
