= Andrea Adriatico =

Italian film director

Andrea Adriatico is an Italian film director. He directed The Wind, in the Evening, and Bitter Years.
