= Love Returns =

- Theatrical release poster
- Directed by: Sergio Rubini
- Written by: Domenico Starnone; Sergio Rubini
- Screenplay by: Carla Cavalluzzi
- Produced by: Donatella Botti
- Starring: Fabrizio Bentivoglio; Margherita Buy; Sergio Rubini; Giovanna Mezzogiorno
- Cinematography: Paolo Carnera
- Edited by: Massimo Fiocchi
- Music by: Ivan Iusco, Pierluigi Ferrandini
- Production company: Bianca Film
- Distributed by: Warner Bros. Pictures
- Release date: 19 March 2004
- Country: Italy
- Language: Italian

Love Returns (Italian: L'amore ritorna) is a 2004 Italian comedy-drama film directed by Sergio Rubini.

For her performance Giovanna Mezzogiorno won the Nastro d'Argento for best supporting actress.

== Cast ==
- Fabrizio Bentivoglio: Luca Florio
- Margherita Buy: Silvia
- Sergio Rubini: Giacomo
- Giovanna Mezzogiorno: Lena
- Eros Pagni: Professor Mangiacane
- Antonio Prisco: Picchio
- Antonello Fassari: Sergio
- Simona Marchini: Flora
- Umberto Orsini: Dr. Ambrosini
- Michele Placido: Dr. Bianco
- Mariangela Melato: Federica Strozzi

== See also ==
- List of Italian films of 2004
