= Intervista =

- Directed by: Federico Fellini
- Screenplay by: Federico Fellini; Gianfranco Angelucci
- Story by: Federico Fellini
- Produced by: Ibrahim Moussa; Pietro Notarianni
- Starring: Anita Ekberg; Marcello Mastroianni; Federico Fellini; Sergio Rubini
- Cinematography: Tonino Delli Colli
- Music by: Nicola Piovani
- Distributed by: Academy Pictures
- Release dates: 18 May 1987 (Cannes); 28 September 1987 (Italy)
- Running time: 105 minutes
- Country: Italy
- Language: Italian

Intervista (Italian for Interview) is a 1987 Italian film directed by Federico Fellini, who co-wrote the screenplay with Gianfranco Angelucci from a story by Fellini.

== Plot ==
Interviewed by a Japanese television crew for a news report on his latest film, Fellini takes the viewer behind the scenes at Cinecittà. A nighttime set is prepared for a sequence that Fellini defines as "the prisoner's dream" in which his hands grope for a way out of a dark tunnel. With his advancing age and weight, Fellini is finding it difficult to escape by simply flying away, but when he does, he contemplates Cinecittà from a great height.

The next morning, Fellini accompanies the Japanese TV crew on a brief tour of the studios. As they walk past absurd TV commercials in production, Fellini's casting director presents him with four young actors she's found to interpret Karl Rossmann, the leading role in Fellini's film version of Franz Kafka's novel Amerika. Fellini introduces the Japanese to the female custodian of Cinecittà, Nadia Ottaviani, but she succeeds in putting off the interview by disappearing into the deserted backlot of Studio 5 to gather dandelions to make herbal tea. Meanwhile, Fellini's assistant director Maurizio Mein is on location with other crew members at the Casa del Passeggero, a once cheap hotel now converted into a drugstore. Fellini wants to include it in his film about the first time he visited Cinecittà as a journalist in 1938 during the Fascist era.

Past and present intermingle as Fellini interacts with his younger self played by aspiring actor Sergio Rubini. After the crew reconstruct the facade of the Casa del Passeggero elsewhere in Rome, a fake tramway takes young Fellini/Rubini from America's Far West with Native American warriors on a clifftop to a herd of wild elephants off the coast of Ethiopia. Arriving at Cinecittà, he sets off to interview matinee idol, Katya, a character representing actress Greta Gonda, with whom he had conducted his very first interview.

Seamlessly, the illusion takes over the realities of filmmaking as the viewer is thrown into two feature films being directed by tyrannical directors, but only for a short while; for the rest of the film, Fellini and Mein scramble to recruit the right cast and build the sets for Amerika, a fictitious adaptation that Fellini uses as a pretext to shoot his film-in-progress. This allows Fellini/Rubini to go back and forth in time to experience filmmaking first-hand, including disgruntled actors who failed their auditions, Marcello Mastroianni in a commercial as Mandrake the Magician, a bomb threat, a visit to Anita Ekberg's house where she and Mastroianni relive their La Dolce Vita scenes, screen tests of Kafka's Brunelda being caressed in a bathtub by two young men, and an inconvenient thunderstorm that heralds the production collapse of Amerika with an attack by bogus Native Americans on horseback wielding television antennae as spears.

Back inside Studio 5 at Cinecittà, Intervista concludes with Fellini's voiceover: "So the movie should end here. Actually, it's finished." In response to producers unhappy with his gloomy endings, Fellini ironically offers them a ray of sunshine by lighting an arc lamp.

== Cast ==
=== Main ===
- Federico Fellini as himself
- Sergio Rubini as Young Fellini / himself
- Antonella Ponziani as Train Girl / herself
- Maurizio Mein as himself
- Paola Liguori as Star
- Lara Wendel as Bride
- Antonio Cantafora as Spouse
- Nadia Ottaviani as Vestal Virgin
- Anita Ekberg as herself
- Marcello Mastroianni as himself

=== Supporting ===
- Maria Teresa Battaglia as Recruited Actress at Train Station
- Christian Borromeo as Christian
- Roberta Carlucci as Recruited Actress in the Subway
- Umberto Conte as Photographer
- Lionello Pio Di Savoia as Aurelio
- Germana Dominici as No Nudity Actress
- Adriana Facchetti as Star's Assistant
- Ettore Geri as Menicuccio
- Eva Grimaldi as Actress at Audition
- Alessandro Marino as Cinecittà Director #1
- Armando Marra as Cinecittà Director #2
- Mario Miyakawa as Japanese Reporter
- Francesca Reggiani as Secretary
- Patrizia Sacchi as Make-up Artist
- Faustone Signoretti as Cinecittà Gate Guard
- Rolando De Santis as Chiodo

=== Uncredited ===
- Tonino Delli Colli as himself
- Federico Fellini as himself
- Gino Millozza as himself
- Danilo Donati as himself
- Delia D'Alberti as Script Girl
- Stefano Corsi as Assistant Director
- Sophie Hicks as Androgenic Actress / herself
- Roberto Ceccacci as Production Assistant
- Piero Vivaldi as Fellini's Driver
- Clarita Gatto as "Fellinian" Woman
- Domiziano Arcangeli as Extra

== Production ==
American filmmaker David Lynch was present during a day of filming, which he described in his 2019 MasterClass series:

One day on the first year of the Center for Advanced Film Studies, Toni Villani asked me to come up to his office and in his office was Roberto Rossellini. And we started talking together. And pretty soon, [Rossellini] invited me to Rome to go to his school, Centro Sperimentale. And I was seriously considering that move. And I probably would've gone there, except his school ran out of money and I stayed at the American Film Institute. Later, I met Isabella Rossellini, his daughter, and we started going together. And one day, Isabella got a film job with a Russian director. I think the thing was called Dark Eyes and it was being shot south of Rome. [...] Isabella and Silvana Mangano, who was in the film as well, and I went to dinner. And Silvana invited Marcello Mastroianni. [...] All this time, it was Marcello telling us stories about Fellini, and me telling Marcello how much I loved Fellini. The next morning, I come out of my hotel and there's a big limousine—a Mercedes and a driver. And Marcello had orchestrated this thing that I got to go into Rome and spend the entire day with [Fellini] while he was shooting his film Intervista. And that was a thrill beyond the beyond.

== Structure ==
Blurring the line between documentary and fiction, Intervista threads four films into one or a film-within-four-films:

Film 1 is a television news report: Japanese journalists arrive on the set to interview Fellini and his crew preparing sets, location scouting, searching for actors, inspecting photographs, and shooting screen tests. Fellini, Anita Ekberg and Marcello Mastroianni appear as themselves.

Film 2 is filmed autobiography: while interviewed by the Japanese, Fellini evokes memories (real or invented) of his first visit to Cinecittà in 1938 as a young journalist commissioned to interview a female matinee idol.

Film 3 is the making of a non-existent movie at Cinecittà, an adaptation of Kafka's Amerika.

Film 4 is the movie itself: Intervista subsumes all three films, making them cohere into the Maestro’s portrait of himself and cinema.

== Reception ==
The film has a 79% approval rating on Rotten Tomatoes, based on 14 reviews with an average rating of 6.9/10. Metacritic, which uses a weighted average, assigned the film a score of 83 out of 100, based on 15 critics, indicating "universal acclaim". The film ranked second on Cahiers du Cinéma's Top 10 Films of the Year List in 1987.

== Awards ==
- 40th Anniversary Prize at the 1987 Cannes Film Festival
- 15th Moscow International Film Festival: Golden Prize
