= Sergio Rubini =

Italian actor and film director

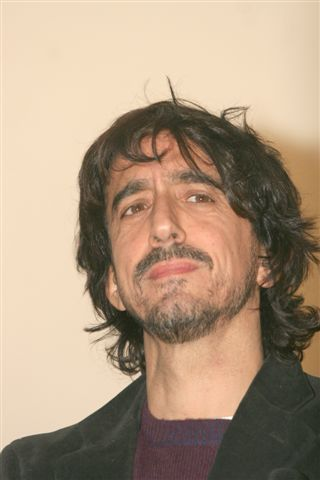
- Rubini in 2008
- Born: 21 December 1959 (age 66); Grumo Appula, Apulia, Italy
- Occupations: Actor; film director; screenwriter
- Years active: 1985–present
- Height: 1.78 m (5 ft 10 in)
- Spouse: Margherita Buy (m. 1991; div. 1993)
- Partners: Carla Cavalluzzi

Sergio Rubini (born 21 December 1959) is an Italian actor, film director and screenwriter.

== Life and career ==
Rubini was born in Grumo Appula, Apulia, but soon moved to Rome to study acting. After some roles in theatre, he debuted in a feature film with Figlio mio infinitamente caro (1985), which was followed by Desiderando Giulia and Il caso Moro. In 1987 he appeared in Federico Fellini's Intervista.

In 1989 Rubini debuted also as a director with La stazione, written with his friend Umberto Marino. The film won a Silver Ribbon and a David di Donatello as best debut work. In 1994 he was again an actor in Carlo Verdone's Al lupo al lupo, and the following year he directed himself and Nastassja Kinski in The Blonde. In 1994 he co-wrote Giuseppe Tornatore's Una pura formalità.

In 1997 he had a cameo appearance in Gabriele Salvatores' film Nirvana, and the same year he directed and starred in The Bride’s Journey (Il viaggio della sposa) with Giovanna Mezzogiorno. In 2000 Rubini was directed again by Salvatores in Denti. In 2004, he cast as Saint Dismas in Mel Gibson's The Passion of the Christ.

== Filmography ==
=== Actor ===
- My Dearest Son (1985) - Marco Morelli
- Desiring Julia (1986) - Stefano
- The Moro Affair (1986) - Giovanni Moro
- Intervista (1987) - Reporter / Sergio Rubini
- Il Grande Blek (1987) - Razzo
- Una notte, un sogno (1988)
- Treno di panna (1988) - Giovanni Maimeri
- I giorni randagi (1988) - Pino
- Mortacci (1989) - Lucillo Cardellini
- Nulla ci può fermare (1989) - Il postino
- Oltre l'oceano (1990)
- The Station (1990) - Domenico
- Ask for the Moon (1991) - The Hitchhiker
- Al lupo al lupo (1992) - Vanni Sagonà
- The Blonde (1993) - Tommaso
- Condannato a nozze (1993) - Roberto
- A Pure Formality (1994) - Andre, the Young Policeman
- Prestazione straordinaria (1994) - Aldo Fiore
- Love Story with Cramps (1995) - Roberto
- Bits and Pieces (1996)
- Nirvana (1997) - Joystick
- The Bride's Journey (1997) - Bartolo
- Shooting the Moon (1998) - Massimo
- Of Lost Love (1998) - Italo
- The Count of Monte Cristo (1998, TV Mini-Series) - Bertuccio
- Ecco fatto (1998) - Madman (uncredited)
- Panni sporchi (1999)
- Die letzte Station (1999) - Nelu
- The Talented Mr. Ripley (1999) - Inspector Roverini
- Mirka (2000) - Helmut
- Tutto l'amore che c'è (2000) - Carlo's Father
- Giorni dispari (2000)
- Denti (2000) - Antonio
- Momo (2001) - Primo Uomo Grigio (voice)
- Amnèsia (2002) - Angelino
- The Power of the Past (2002) - Gianni Orzan
- Soul Mate (2002) - Angelantonio
- A. A. A. Achille (2003) - Remo
- Mio cognato (2003) - Toni Catapano
- The Passion of the Christ (2004) - Dismas
- L'amore ritorna (2004) - Giacomo
- Manual of Love (2005) - Marco
- Our Land (2006) - Tonino
- Commediasexi (2006) - Mariano Di Virgilio
- Manual of Love 2 (2007) - Fosco
- At a Glance (2008) - Lulli
- No Problem (2008) - Enrico Pignataro
- Wedding Fever in Campobello (2009) - Egidio - Saras Onkel und Barbesitzer
- Cosmonaut (2009) - Armando
- The Cézanne Affair (2009) - Ernesto Rossetti
- Tutto l'amore del mondo (2010) - Maurizio Marini
- Parents and Children: Shake Well Before Using (2010) - Patient on the bench (uncredited)
- Qualunquemente (2011) - Gerardo Salerno
- 6 sull'autobus (2012)
- Discovery at Dawn (2012) - Lorenzo, Barbara's boyfriend
- Mi rifaccio vivo (2013) - Avvocato Mancuso
- How Strange to Be Named Federico (2013) - Madonnaro
- Road 47 (2013) - Roberto
- The Fifth Wheel (2013) - Fabrizio Del Monte
- Mafia and Red Tomatoes (2014) - Cosimo
- Ever Been to the Moon? (2015) - Delfo
- Let's Talk (2015) - Vanni
- La stoffa dei sogni (2016) - Oreste Campese
- These Days (2016) - il papà di Angela
- No Country for Young Men (2017) - Padre di Sandro
- Couple Therapy for Cheaters (2017) - Prof. Malavolta
- Quando sarò bambino (2018)
- Il bene mio (2018) - Elia
- The King's Musketeers (2018) - Aramis
- Il grande spirito (2019) - Tonino
- Se mi vuoi bene (2019) - Massimiliano
- The Story of My Wife (2020) - Kodor
- Felicità (2023) - Bruno

=== Director ===
- The Station (1990)
- The Blonde (1993)
- Prestazione straordinaria (1994)
- The Bride's Journey (1997)
- Tutto l'amore che c'è (2000)
- Soul Mate (2001)
- Love Returns (2004)
- Our Land (2006)
- The Cézanne Affair (2008)
- At a Glance (2009)
- Mi rifaccio vivo (2013)
- Let's Talk (2015)
- Il Grande Spirito (2019)
- I fratelli De Filippo (2021)
