= The Embalmer (2002 film) =

2002 Italian drama film

- Directed by: Matteo Garrone
- Written by: Ugo Chiti; Massimo Gaudioso; Matteo Garrone
- Produced by: Domenico Procacci
- Starring: Valerio Foglia Manzillo; Ernesto Mahieux
- Cinematography: Marco Onorato
- Edited by: Marco Spoletini
- Music by: Banda Osiris
- Production company: Fandango
- Distributed by: Fandango
- Release date: 2002
- Running time: 100 minutes
- Country: Italy
- Language: Italian

The Embalmer (Italian: L'imbalsamatore, also known as The Taxidermist) is a 2002 Italian noir-drama film directed by Matteo Garrone. The film was selected for the Quinzaine des Realisateurs in the 2002 Cannes Film Festival as L'etrange monsieur Peppino. The plot is based on real events. For his performance in the film Ernesto Mahieux won the David di Donatello for Best Supporting Actor. The film was also awarded with a David di Donatello for Best Script and two Nastro d'Argento awards for best editing and best producer.

== Plot ==
The film concerns competing personal and sexual relationships.

== Cast ==
- Valerio Foglia Manzillo as Valerio
- Ernesto Mahieux as Peppino
- Elisabetta Rocchetti as Deborah
- Lina Bernardi as Deborah's mother
- Pietro Biondi as Deborah's father
- Aldo Leonardi as Deborah's boss

== Reception ==
The Embalmer has an approval rating of 81% on review aggregator website Rotten Tomatoes, based on 32 reviews, and an average rating of 6.8/10. The website's critical consensus states: "Intriguingly creepy and unsettling". Metacritic assigned the film a weighted average score of 71 out of 100, based on 16 critics, indicating "generally favorable reviews".

== See also ==
- List of Italian films of 2002
