= Fabrizio Bentivoglio =

Italian actor and screenwriter

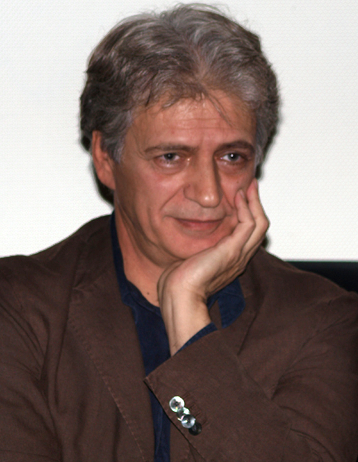
- Bentivoglio in 2011
- Born: 4 January 1957 (age 69); Milan, Italy
- Occupation: Actor
- Height: 1.74 m (5 ft 9 in)

Fabrizio Bentivoglio (born 4 January 1957) is an Italian film and stage actor and screenwriter.

== Biography ==
Fabrizio Bentivoglio was born in Milan (his father is Venetian). After only one season in the juvenile team of Inter Milan, he left his sporting career because of an injury to his left knee and attended the school of the Piccolo Teatro in Milan. He debuted on stage acting in Timon of Athens by William Shakespeare and also pursued his artistic career in cinema.

Continuing his studies in medicine, he then moved to Rome. With Dario de Luca and in association with Studio Universal he founded the Tipota Movie Company.

With the band Piccola Orchestra Avion Travel he has staged the show La guerra vista dalla luna. He has also filmed the short film Típota (1999) and has completed a tour performing his own songs.

The soundtrack of Eternity and a Day (Italy/France/Greece, 1998) by Theo Angelopoulos contains the track "The Poet", with Bentivoglio's voice.

== Filmography ==
- The Blue-Eyed Bandit (1980) - Riccardo - aka Rick
- Masoch (1980) - Alexander
- The Lady of the Camellias (1981) - Dumas son
- La festa perduta (1981)
- Vatican Conspiracy (1982) - Padre Bruno Martello
- Woman of Wonders (1985) - Gianni
- The Rover (1985, TV Movie)
- Salomè (1986) - Yokanaan
- Via Montenapoleone (1987) - Roberto
- Regina (1987) - Lorenzo
- Apartment Zero (1988) - Carlos Sanchez-Verne
- Rebus (1989) - Raul Echegarraya
- Marrakech Express (1989) - Marco
- On Tour (1989, also writer)
- Turné (1990) - Federico Lolli
- The Peaceful Air of the West (1990) - Cesare
- Italia - Germania 4-3 (1990) - Francesco
- Red American (1991) - Vittorio Benvegnu
- Puerto Escondido (1992) - Mario
- The End Is Known (Italy / France, 1993) - Bernardo Manni
- A Soul Split in Two (1993) - Pietro Di Leo
- Like Two Crocodiles (1994) - Gabriele
- Ordinary Hero (1995) - Giorgio Ambrosoli
- School (1995) - Sperone
- Livers Ain't Cheap (1996) - Alfredo Donati
- The Elective Affinities (1996) - Ottone
- Slaughter of the Cock (1996)
- Sacred Silence (1996) - Don Lorenzo Borrelli
- An Eyewitness Account (1997) - Piero Nava
- Marianna Ucrìa (1997)
- The Acrobats (1997) - Stefano
- I cortiitaliani (1997)
- Of Lost Love (1998) - Marco
- Eternity and a Day (1998) - The Poet
- Notes of Love (1998) - Antonio, Gerardo's father
- The Nanny (1999) - Prof. Mori
- Típota (Italy, 1999, Short) - Actor
- The Missing (1999) - Monsignor Tommaso
- Teeth (Italy, 2000) - Uncle Nino
- Holy Tongue (2000) - Willy detto 'Alain Delon'
- Magicians (2000) - Hugo
- Hotel (2001) - Very Important Doctor
- A cavallo della tigre (2002) - Guido
- Remember Me, My Love (2003) - Carlo Ristuccia
- Love Returns (2004) - Luca Florio
- La terra (2006) - Luigi Di Santo
- The Family Friend (2006) - Gino
- The Right Distance (2007) - Bengivenga
- Don't Waste Your Time, Johnny! (2007, also director) - Augusto Riverberi
- Happy Family (2010) - Vincenzo
- A Second Childhood (2010) - Lino
- Easy! (2011) - Prof. Bruno Beltrame
- Tutto tutto niente niente (2012) - Sottosegretario
- The Chair of Happiness (2013) - The 2nd Seller of Paintings
- Human Capital (2013) - Dino Ossola
- The Invisible Boy (2014) - Basili
- Let's Talk (2015) - Alfredo
- The Last Will Be the Last (2015) - Antonio Zanzotto
- Forever Young (2016) - Giorgio
- Sconnessi (2018) - Ettore Ranieri
- Loro (2018) - Santino Recchia
- The Name of the Rose (2019, TV Series) - Remigio da Varagine
- Il flauto magico di Piazza Vittorio (2018) - Sarastro
- The Invisible Witness (2018) - Tommaso
- An Almost Ordinary Summer (2019) - Tony
- Rose Island (2020) - Franco Restivo
- Security (2021) - Curzio Pilati
- September (2022) - Guglielmo
- Thank You Guys (2023) - Michele
- The Worst Days (2023)
- Eternal Visionary (2024) - Luigi Pirandello

== Stage ==
- Timoned'Atene (Italy, 1978) (tragedy in five acts by William Shakespeare); production by Carlo Rivolta;
- La tempesta (Italy, 1978) (play in five acts by William Shakespeare); production by Giorgio Strehler;
- Iparentiterribili (Italy, 1979) (by Jean Cocteau); production by Franco Enriquez;
- Prima del silenzio (Italy, 1980) (by Giuseppe Patroni Griffi); production by Giorgio De Lullo;
- L'avaro (Italy, 1981) (by Molière); production by Mario Scaccia;
- La vera storia (Italy, 1982) (by Luciano Berio and Italo Calvino); production by Maurizio Scaparro, Teatro La Scala in Milan;
- Gli amanti dei miei amanti sono miei amanti (Italy, 1982) (by Giuseppe Patroni-Griffi); production by Giuseppe Patroni-Griffi;
- Metti una sera a cena (Italy, 1983) (by Giuseppe Patroni-Griffi); production by Giuseppe Patroni-Griffi;
- D'amore si muore (Italy, 1985) (comedy by Giuseppe Patroni-Griffi); production by Giuseppe Patroni-Griffi;
- Italia-Germania 4 a 3 (Italy, 1987) (by Umberto Marino); regia di Sergio Rubini;
- La guerra vista dalla luna (Italy, 1995) (little opera in one act PeppeServillo);
- La tempesta (Italy, 2000) (play in five acts by William Shakespeare); production by Giorgio Barberio Corsetti, Teatro Argentina in Rome;

== Awards ==
- Venice, 11/09/1993 Coppa Volpi for the Best Actor for A Soul Split in Two
- Venice, 11/09/1993 Premio Pasinetti for the Actor for A Soul Split in Two
- Grolla d'oro 1993 Best Actor for The End Is Known
- Ciak d'oro 1994 Best Actor for A Soul Split in Two
- Montréal World Film Festival 1995 Best Actor for An Ordinary Hero
- Venice 1996 Premio Pasinetti for the Actor for Sacred Silence
- Ciak d'oro 1997 Best Actor for An Eyewitness Account
- Sacher d'oro 1997 Best Actor for An Eyewitness Account
- David di Donatello 1996-1997 Best Actor for An Eyewitness Account
- Venice 1999 Premio FEDIC, special mention for Típota
- São Paulo International Film Festival 1999 Best Short (Audience Award) for Típota
- David di Donatello 1998-1999 Best Supporting Actor for Del perduto amore
- David di Donatello 1999-2000 Nominated as Best Short for Típota
- Nastri d'argento 2000 Best Producer of Shorts (to the Tipota Movie Company) for Típota and Il bambino con la pistola
- Taormina, 29/06-07/07/2001 Nastri d'argento 2001 Nominated as Best Actor for Holy Tongue
