= Edoardo Purgatori =

Italian actor (born 1989)

- Born: Edoardo Purgatori; January 14, 1989 (age 37); Rome, Italy
- Other name: Edoardo Hendrik
- Education: German School of Rome
- Occupation: Actor
- Years active: 2007–present
- Spouse: Livia Belelli (m. 2018)

Edoardo Purgatori (born January 14, 1989, in Rome), also credited early as Ed Hendrik, is a German-Italian actor working in film, television and theatre.

Trained at the Oxford School of Drama (Foundation Course), he has collaborated with acclaimed directors including Ferzan Özpetek, Paolo Virzì, Gabriele Mainetti, Michele Placido, Nanni Moretti and Oliver Stone. He is currently touring Italy in the lead role of Brokeback Mountain and has received awards such as the Nastro d’Argento 2025 (ensemble cast, Diamanti), the Claudio Nobis Award 2025 and Best Actor at the Milan Shorts Film Festival 2024.

== Biography ==
Edoardo Purgatori was born in Rome to Italian journalist and screenwriter Andrea Purgatori (1953–2023) and German art historian and actress Nicola Schmitz. He grew up bilingual, attending the German School of Rome, where he became part of the school’s theatre company. At eighteen he began training with Actors Studio members from New York, and later studied in London, joining the Oxford School of Drama where he completed the Foundation Course in 2009.

He made his television debut in 2007 in Donna Detective (RAI), followed by further roles in Italian TV dramas. International visibility came in 2012 with a small role in Woody Allen’s To Rome with Love. In the same year he appeared in the RAI film Anita Garibaldi as the historical figure Nino Bixio. He gained wider recognition between 2013 and 2016 with the recurring role of Emiliano Lupi in the popular RAI series Un Medico in Famiglia.

In cinema, Purgatori has since worked with leading Italian directors, including Paolo Virzì (Dry), Ferzan Özpetek (La Dea Fortuna, Diamanti, The Ignorant Angels), Gabriele Mainetti (Freaks Out), Michele Placido (Eterno Visionario), Claudio Amendola (La mossa del pinguino), Giovanni Veronesi and Pilar Fogliati (Romantiche), Michela Giraud (Flaminia) and Monica Guerritore (Anna). His television and streaming work includes Le fate ignoranti (The Ignorant Angels, Disney+), Vincenzo Malinconico (season 2), and Una finestra vista lago (Rai1).

On stage, Purgatori has played leading roles in a wide range of productions. After early appearances in The Glass Menagerie by Tennessee Williams and The Shape of Things by Neil LaBute, he developed a strong presence in contemporary English drama, starring in Mouthpiece, Girl in the Machine, Killology and The Pass. In Italy he has worked extensively under the direction of Ferzan Özpetek, notably in the stage version of Mine Vaganti, and has appeared in Giuseppe Patroni Griffi’s Metti, una sera a cena. His theatre work also includes Maratona di New York and a series of contemporary productions in Rome such as Il Professionista (Sala Umberto) and Santa Maria della Pietà – Le Agitate (Off/Off Theatre). In 2025/26 he will take on the lead role of Ennis Del Mar in Brokeback Mountain, directed by Giancarlo Nicoletti, for a nationwide Italian tour.

In 2026 he appeared in Nanni Moretti’s feature film It Will Happen Tonight, further establishing his presence within contemporary Italian auteur cinema, and in the latest film by Academy Award-winning American director Oliver Stone White Lies.

In 2026 he also took part in Hydra, a contemporary performance project by Spanish writer and stage artist Carla Nyman, presented at the Real Academia de España in Rome, where he portrayed Heracles.

== Awards ==
· Milan Shorts Film Festival 2024 – Best Actor (When I Grow Up)

· Claudio Nobis Award 2025 – Best Actor Under 35 (Metti, una sera a cena)

· Nastro d’Argento 2025 – Film of the Year (Diamanti, ensemble cast)

== Filmography ==
=== Films ===
| Year | Title | Role(s) | Notes |
|---|---|---|---|
| 2011 | G: The Other Me | G | Short film |
| 2012 | To Rome with Love | Architect | Cameo appearance |
| 2012 | The Fallen Angel | Gabriel | Short film |
| 2013 | The Move of the Penguin | Bulletto | |
| 2016 | Ben-Hur | Angry slave | Cameo appearance |
| 2016 | La grande rabbia | Stefano | |
| 2016 | Mine | Radio operator | Uncredited voice cameo |
| 2018 | The Record of Existence | Max | Short film |
| 2018 | Quando corre Nuvolari | Achille Varzi | |
| 2019 | The Goddess of Fortune | Marco | |
| 2020 | Mr. H | Samuel Smiley | Short film |
| 2021 | Omeostasi | Leonardo | Short film |
| 2021 | Freaks Out | Soldier #2 | Cameo appearance |
| 2022 | Dry | Pierluigi | |
| 2023 | Romantic Girls | Riky | |
| 2024 | Flaminia | Alberto | |
| 2024 | Eternal Visionary | Friedrich Wilhelm Murnau | |
| 2024 | Diamonds | Ennio | |
| 2025 | Anna | Luca Magnani | |
| 2026 | It Will Happen Tonight | TBA | |

=== Television ===
| Year | Title | Role(s) | Notes |
|---|---|---|---|
| 2007–2010 | Donna Detective | Mirco | Main role |
| 2009 | Un caso di coscienza | Collina | Episode: "Nessuna pietà" |
| 2010 | Mia madre | Alberto | Television film |
| 2012 | Anita Garibaldi | Nino Bixio | Miniseries |
| 2013–2016 | Un medico in famiglia | Emiliano Lupi | Main role (seasons 8–10) |
| 2014 | Amore oggi | Paride | Television movie |
| 2017 | Tutto può succedere | Valerio | Recurring role (season 2) |
| 2018 | Il confine | Caporale Dalmasso | Miniseries |
| 2018 | Baby | Lele | Recurring role; 3 episodes |
| 2022 | The Ignorant Angels | Riccardo | Main role |
| 2024 | Vincenzo Malinconico, Unsuccessful Lawyer | Paolo Rogna | Recurring role (season 2) |
