= Jack Frusciante Left the Band =

1996 film by Enza Negroni

- Directed by: Enza Negroni
- Starring: Stefano Accorsi; Violante Placido; Alessandro Zamattio; Barbara Livi; Athina Cenci; Ivano Marescotti
- Cinematography: Alessio Gelsini Torresi
- Music by: Umberto Palazzo
- Release date: 2 April 1996
- Country: Italy
- Language: Italian

Jack Frusciante Left the Band (Italian: Jack Frusciante è uscito dal gruppo) is a 1996 Italian teen drama film directed by Enza Negroni. It is based on Enrico Brizzi's bestseller Jack Frusciante Has Left the Band.

== Cast ==
- Stefano Accorsi as Alex
- Violante Placido as Adelaide / Aidi
- Alessandro Zamattio as Martino
- Barbara Livi as Valentina
- Andrea Manai as Tony
- Riccardo Pedrazzoli as Rocco
- Stefano Rivi as Nardini
- Angela Baraldi as Caterina
- Simone Sabattini as Hoge
- Ivano Marescotti as Father of Alex
- Athina Cenci as Mother of Alex

== Plot ==
The movie follows the story of Alex, a rebellious 17-year-old from Bologna who rebels against the predictable path laid out for him by his bourgeois environment. His life begins to shift when he meets Aidi, a sharp, independent girl. While navigating his feelings for Aidi, Alex spends time with Martino, a wealthy but socially isolated boy who introduces him to a more chaotic, emotionally charged side of life.
