= My Family (disambiguation) =

My Family is a 2000–2011 BBC series.

"My Family" may also refer to:

- My Family (1982 film), a Latvian Soviet television two-part film
- My Family (1995 film), an American film directed by Gregory Nava
- My Family (Hong Kong TV series), 2005
- My Family (Italian TV series), 2025
- My Family (Malaysian TV series), 2012
- Ma Famille, an Ivorian TV series, 2002–2007
- Moya Semia (Моя Семья), Russian franchise of Minute Maid beverages
- The Family Channel (American TV network, founded 2008), named "My Family TV" between 2009 and 2013
- My Family, Japanese TV series (2022), starring Kazunari Ninomiya
