= Aurora Giovinazzo =

Italian actress (born 2002)

- Born: 18 April 2002 (age 24); Rome, Italy
- Occupations: Actress, dancer
- Years active: 2010–present

Aurora Giovinazzo (born 18 April 2002) is an Italian actress and professional dancer.

== Career ==
Born in Rome, she spent her childhood in the Agro Romanus area of Casalotti, with her parents, both restorers, and her sister, actress Domiziana Giovinazzo. At the age of nine, she began studying latin dance, including merengue, salsa and bachata, eventually becoming a European and World Champion winner in bachata competitions.

In 2017, she starred alongside Anna Valle, Giorgio Marchesi and Loretta Goggi in the Rai 1 series Sorelle, directed by Cinzia TH Torrini and shot in Matera.

In 2021, Giovinazzo appeared in a leading role in Gabriele Mainetti's film Freaks Out, for which she received a nomination for the David di Donatello for best actress. At the 78th Venice International Film Festival, she won the Nuovo IMAIE Talent Award for Best New Young Actress and the RB Casting Award.

In 2022, she landed her first leading role in the thriller The Man on the Street. In 2023, she starred again in The Cage - Nella gabbia, directed by Massimiliano Zanin. In the same year, Ferzan Özpetek selected her for his film Nuovo Olimpo.

In 2024, she was once again cast by Özpetek in Diamanti, where she starred alongside Elena Sofia Ricci, Luisa Ranieri and Anna Ferzetti. In the same year, she joined the cast of Eternal Visionary, directed and written by Michele Placido, and took on the lead role in Una madre by Stefano Chiantini. In 2025, she appeared in the cast of the Netflix series My Family, directed by Claudio Cupellini.

== Personal life ==
She has an older sister, Domiziana, who previously acted in the medical drama Un medico in famiglia.

== Filmography ==
=== Film ===
Year	Title	Role	Notes	Ref.
2011	The Immature	Penelope		
2011	Il sesso aggiunto	Caterina		
2012	The Immature: The Trip	Penelope		
2012	Breve storia di lunghi tradimenti	Gaia		
2021	Freaks Out	Matilde		
2021	Dog Years	Stella		
2022	L'uomo sulla strada	Irene		
2023	Nuovo Olimpo	Alice		
2023	Una madre	TBA		
2024	Eternal Visionary	Lietta		
2024	Diamonds	Beatrice		
2025	The Big Fake	Virginia		
2026	Prendiamoci una pausa	Erica		

=== Television ===
Year	Title	Role	Notes	Ref.
2010	Caterina e le sue figlie	Caterina Balestra	3 episodes	
2011	La donna che ritorna			
2011–2013	Rossella			
2011–2016	Don Matteo	Cecilia Castellani / Giorgia Barani	2 episodes	
2012	Così è la vita			
2014	Il peccato e la vergogna			
2014–2018	Furore	Rosa Licata	Main role	
2015	Una casa nel cuore	Aurora	Television movie	
2016	La classe degli asini	Flavia	Television movie	
2017	Sorelle	Stella Roversi	Main role	
2018	Carlo & Malik	Veronica	2 episodes	
2019	Oltre la soglia	Marica	Main role	
2021	Up&Down	Camilla	Miniseries	
2025	My Family	Valeria	6 episodes	

== Awards and nominations ==
Accolades received by Aurora Giovinazzo
Year	Award	Category	Work	Result	Ref.
2021	Venice Film Festival	Nuovo IMAIE Talent Award – Best New Young Actress	Freaks Out	Won	
2021	Venice Film Festival	RB Casting Award	Freaks Out	Won	
2022	David di Donatello	Best Actress	Freaks Out	Nominated	
2022	Nastro d'Argento	Best Actress	Freaks Out	Nominated	
