= Violante Placido =

Italian actress and singer (born 1976)

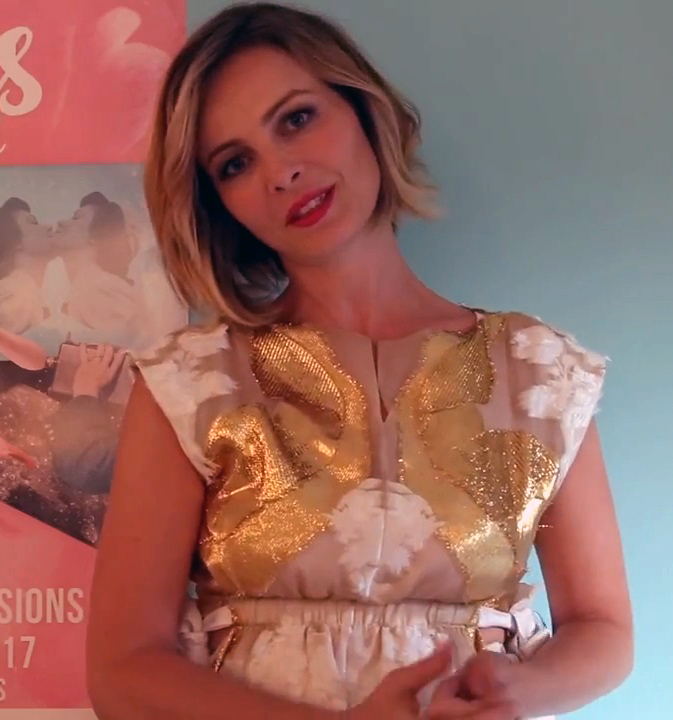
- Placido in 2017
- Born: Maria Violante Placido; 1 May 1976 (age 50); Rome, Italy
- Other name: Viola
- Occupations: Actress; singer
- Years active: 1993–present
- Children: 1
- Parents: Michele Placido (father); Simonetta Stefanelli (mother)
- Relatives: Gerardo Amato (uncle)

Maria Violante Placido (Italian: [vjoˈlante ˈplaːtʃido, vio-]; born 1 May 1976) is an Italian actress and singer.

== Early life ==
Violante Placido was born in Rome, Italy, into a family deeply involved in the arts. She is the daughter of actor and director Michele Placido and actress Simonetta Stefanelli, and grew up surrounded by cinema and theatre. She spent much of her childhood observing film sets and rehearsals, which fostered her interest in performing from a young age. She later described this environment as formative in developing both her artistic curiosity and her desire to pursue a creative career of her own.

== Career ==
=== Film and television ===
Placido made her film debut alongside her father in Quattro bravi ragazzi (1993). In 1996 she appeared in Enza Negroni's Jack Frusciante Left the Band. Her first important role was in L'anima gemella (2002), directed by Sergio Rubini.

In the following years Placido appeared in Ora o mai più (2003), by Lucio Pellegrini, Che ne sarà di noi (2004), by Giovanni Veronesi, and Ovunque sei (2004), directed by her father. In 2007, she starred in Pupi Avati's comedy La cena per farli conoscere. In 2009, she played a role in the Hindi movie Barah Aana. She also played the title role as Moana Pozzi in the 2009 miniseries Moana. In 2010, she appeared alongside George Clooney in the drama-thriller The American.

Placido played Nadya in the 2011 film Ghost Rider: Spirit of Vengeance, a sequel to the 2007 film Ghost Rider, both based on the Marvel Comics character of the same name.

In 2014 Placido starred in Transporter: The Series, a spin-off from the film franchise of the same name. In season two, she plays Caterina Boldieu, a former French intelligence officer, who is assisting Frank Martin, the Transporter.

=== Music ===
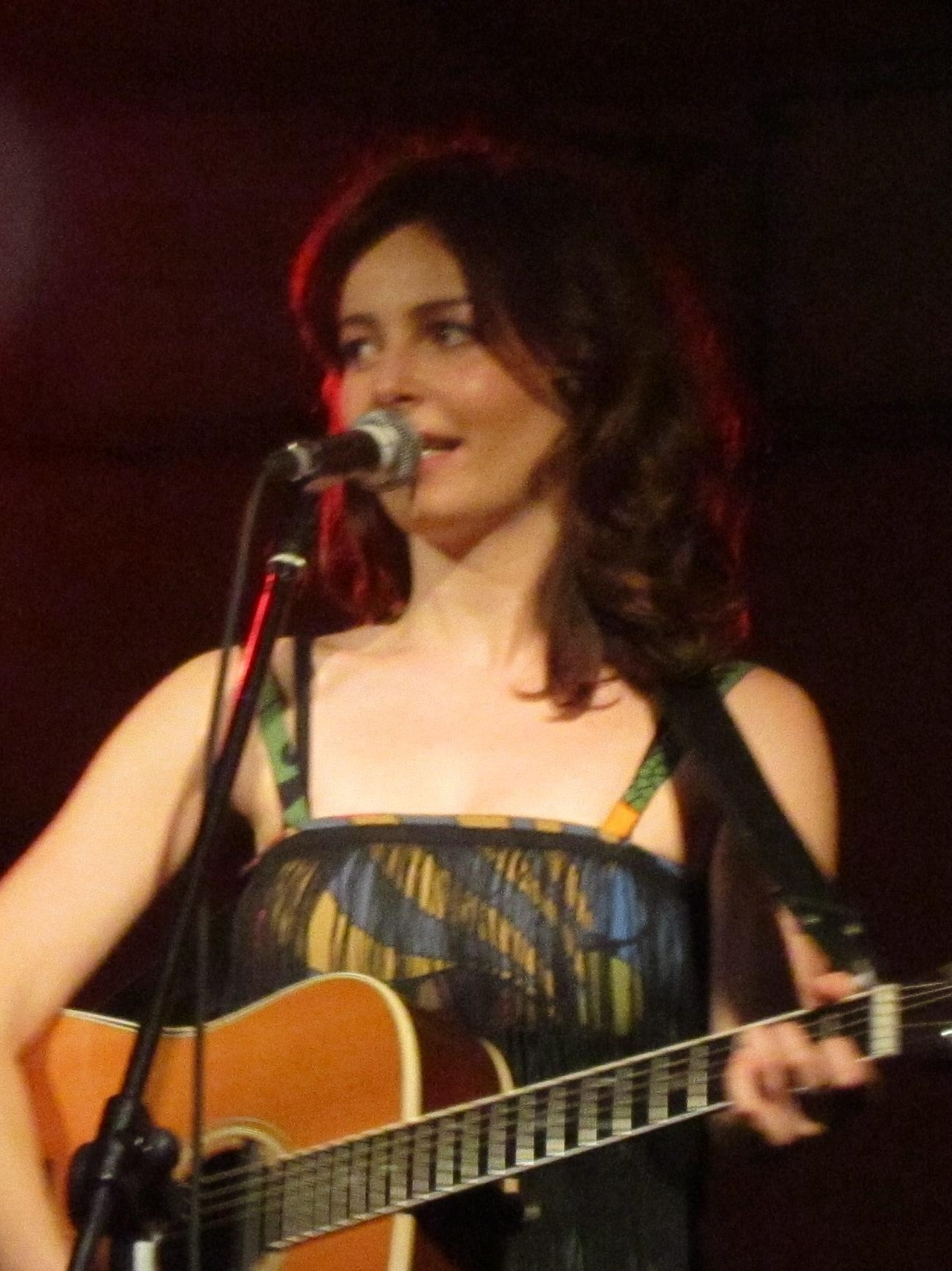
Placido in concert in Cantù, June 2010

In 2006, Placido released, under the name Viola, her first album as a singer, Don't be shy..., including 10 tracks she wrote (most of which are in English), inspired by Stuart Benson. Viola sings in the style of singer-songwriter Suzanne Vega. The second single is "How to save your Life". Subsequently, she collaborated with the Italian singer-songwriter Bugo in the remake duet version of his song "Amore mio infinito".

== Personal life ==
Violante Placido has one child with her partner, Massimiliano D'Epiro, who is an Italian film director.

She is a fan of Italian football team S.S. Lazio.

== Filmography ==
=== Film ===
| Year | Film | Role | Notes | Ref(s) |
|---|---|---|---|---|
| 1993 | Quattro bravi ragazzi | Valeria | Film debut | |
| 1996 | Vite strozzate | Laura | | |
| 1996 | Jack Frusciante è uscito dal gruppo | Adelaide | | |
| 1997 | Farfalle | | | |
| 2000 | A Deadly Compromise | Caterina | | |
| 2002 | Les amants de Mogador | Hélène | | |
| 2002 | Ciao America | Paola Angelini | | |
| 2002 | Soul Mate | Maddalena | Major role | |
| 2002 | Ginostra | Nurse | | |
| 2003 | Now or Never | Viola | | |
| 2003 | Gli indesiderabili | Agneska | | |
| 2004 | Che ne sarà di noi | Carmen | | |
| 2004 | Ovunque sei | Elena | | |
| 2004 | Ruins | July | | |
| 2005 | Raul – Diritto di uccidere | Sonia | | |
| 2006 | Fade to Black | Stella | | |
| 2006 | Any Reason Not to Marry? | Nina | | |
| 2007 | A Dinner for Them to Meet | Betty Lanza | | |
| 2007 | Lessons in Chocolate | Cecilia Ferri | | |
| 2008 | La luna nel deserto | Voice | Short | |
| 2009 | Sleepless | Anna | | |
| 2009 | Barah Aana | Kate | Bollywood film | |
| 2010 | The American | Clara | Hollywood film | |
| 2011 | Ghost Rider: Spirit of Vengeance | Nadya | Hollywood film | |
| 2012 | The Lookout | Anna | | |
| 2016 | 7 Minutes | Marianna | | |
| 2019 | Modalità aereo | Linda | | |
| 2022 | Improvvisamente Natale | Alberta | | |
| 2023 | Improvvisamente a Natale mi sposo | Alberta | | |
| 2025 | La Dolce Villa | Francesca | | |

=== Television ===
| Year | Title | Role | Notes | Ref(s) |
|---|---|---|---|---|
| 2001 | Casa famiglia | | TV series | |
| 2005 | Karol: A Man Who Became Pope | Maria Pomorska | TV movie | |
| 2005 | Les Rois maudits | | TV mini-series | |
| 2006 | The Mona Lisa Mystery | Aurore | TV movie | |
| 2007 | War and Peace | Helene Kuragin | TV mini-series | |
| 2007 | Quelli che... il calcio | Herself | TV series | |
| 2008 | Una madre | Maria | TV movie | |
| 2008 | Donne assassine | Marta | TV series | |
| 2008 | Pinocchio | Fata Turchina (Blue Fairy) | TV movie | |
| 2009 | Moana | Moana | TV movie | |
| 2010 | Entertainment Tonight | Herself | TV series | |
| 2010 | Janela Indiscreta | Herself | TV series | |
| 2014 | Transporter: The Series | Caterina Boldieu | TV series (11 episodes) | |

=== Music videos ===
- "'Solo' è solo una parola" by Tiziano Ferro (2018)
