= A Dinner for Them to Meet =

2007 Italian comedy film

- Theatrical release poster
- Directed by: Pupi Avati
- Cinematography: Pasquale Rachini
- Music by: Riz Ortolani
- Distributed by: Medusa Film
- Release date: 2 February 2007
- Country: Italy
- Language: Italian

A Dinner for Them to Meet (Italian: La cena per farli conoscere) is a 2007 Italian comedy film directed by Pupi Avati.

== Premise ==
After Sandro Lanza, an aging television soap opera television star, suffers through an embarrassing televised media event, he attempts suicide. This brings his three daughters, Clara, Betty and Ines, the children of three different wives, to his home in Rome, where they meet each other for the first time.

== Cast ==
- Diego Abatantuono as Sandro Lanza
- Vanessa Incontrada as Clara Lanza
- Violante Placido as Elisabetta "Betty" Lanza
- Inés Sastre as Ines Lanza
- Francesca Neri as Alma Kero
- Gianfranco Barra as Corrado
- Fabio Ferrari as Matteo
- Blas Roca Rey as Federico
