= Il caso Pisciotta =

- Directed by: Eriprando Visconti
- Cinematography: Erico Menczer
- Edited by: Franco Arcalli
- Music by: Antonino Riccardo Luciani
- Release date: 1972
- Language: Italian

Il caso Pisciotta (The Pisciotta Case) is a 1972 Italian historical drama film written and directed by Eriprando Visconti. It is based on actual events involving Gaspare Pisciotta, lieutenant of the bandit Salvatore Giuliano, and his death by poisoning in jail in 1954.

== Plot ==
Gaspare Pisciotta, first lieutenant and then assassin of the bandit Salvatore Giuliano, is poisoned with strychnine-laced coffee in Palermo's Ucciardone prison. A young Sicilian magistrate, Francesco Scauri, who has returned from the mainland specifically for the case, is assigned to handle the case. Francesco soon finds himself entangled in a dark web of conspiracy—including his family, as his father, a real estate speculator, relies on the support of powerful figures—who are trying to prevent him from uncovering the truth. Finally, after a second murder inside the prison, involving another member of Giuliano's gang, Scauri manages to acquire, thanks to the revelations of a young inmate, Amerigo Lojacono, sufficient evidence to indict two inmates, Don Vincenzo Coluzzi, a powerful mafia boss, and Rocco Minutti, as responsible for Pisciotta's murder. At this point, however, the instigators of the crime, feeling threatened, do not allow him to proceed further: Amerigo, raped by his cellmates, withdraws his testimony; the magistrate, kidnapped from the home of his lover, a pharmacist, disappears forever.

== Cast ==
- Tony Musante: Francesco Scauri
- Carla Gravina: Gemma
- Salvo Randone: Don Ferdinando Cusimano
- Saro Urzì: Don Vincenzo Coluzzi
- Arturo Dominici: Michele Scauri
- Mico Cundari: D'Eusebio
- Michele Placido: Amerigo Lo Jacono
- Corrado Gaipa: direttore del carcere
- Duilio Del Prete: Agent Sciurti
- Nino Terzo: Rocco Minotti
- Renato Pinciroli: Salvatore Pisciotta
- Paolo Modugno: Gaspare Pisciotta
- Vittorio Mezzogiorno: Agent Beretta
- Antonio Casagrande: maresciallo
- Simonetta Stefanelli: Anna
