= Diamonds (2024 film) =

2024 comedy-drama film

- Directed by: Ferzan Özpetek
- Screenplay by: Elisa Casseri; Carlotta Corradi; Ferzan Özpetek
- Produced by: Marco Belardi
- Starring: Luisa Ranieri; Jasmine Trinca; Stefano Accorsi; Luca Barbarossa; Sara Bosi; Loredana Cannata; Geppi Cucciari; Anna Ferzetti; Aurora Giovinazzo; Nicole Grimaudo; Milena Mancini; Vinicio Marchioni; Paola Minaccioni; Edoardo Purgatori; Carmine Recano; Elena Sofia Ricci; Lunetta Savino; Vanessa Scalera; Carla Signoris; Kasia Smutniak; Mara Venier; Giselda Volodi; Milena Vukotic
- Cinematography: Gian Filippo Corticelli
- Edited by: Pietro Morana
- Music by: Giuliano Taviani; Carmelo Travia
- Distributed by: Vision Distribution
- Release date: 19 December 2024
- Running time: 136 minutes
- Country: Italy
- Language: Italian

Diamonds (Italian: Diamanti) is a 2024 Italian comedy-drama film co-written and directed by Ferzan Özpetek.

== Plot ==
Set in the 1970s and present day, the film tells the story of sisters Alberta and Gabriella Canova and the group of women who work for their cinema costume company in Rome.

== Cast ==
- Luisa Ranieri as Alberta Canova
- Jasmine Trinca as Gabriella Canova
- Stefano Accorsi as Lorenzo
- Luca Barbarossa as Lucio
- Sara Bosi as Giuseppina
- Loredana Cannata as Rita
- Geppi Cucciari as Fausta
- Anna Ferzetti as Paolina
- Aurora Giovinazzo as Beatrice
- Nicole Grimaudo as Carlotta
- Milena Mancini as Nicoletta
- Vinicio Marchioni as Bruno
- Paola Minaccioni as Nina
- Elena Sofia Ricci as herself
- Lunetta Savino as Eleonora
- Vanessa Scalera as Bianca Vega
- Carla Signoris as Alida Borghese
- Kasia Smutniak as Sofia Volpi
- Mara Venier as Silvana
- Giselda Volodi as Franca Zinzi
- Milena Vukotic as Aunt Olga
- Ferzan Özpetek as himself

== Production ==
Özpetek got inspiration for the film from his early days as assistant director, when he used to visit the Sartoria Tirelli led by Piero Tosi. Principal photography started in Rome on 1 July 2024, and shootings wrapped in August.

The film was produced by Greenboo Production, Faros Film and Vision Distribution, in collaboration with Sky. With the theme song "Diamanti", it marked a new collaboration between Özpetek and Giorgia 21 years after "Gocce di memoria", the theme of the 2003 film Facing Windows.

== Release ==
The film was released in Italian cinemas by Vision Distribution on 19 December 2024.

== Reception ==
The film was a major hit, grossing over 16 million euros at the Italian box office, with over 2.1 million admissions. It was Özpetek's highest-grossing film in his career.
