= Ovunque sei =

- Directed by: Michele Placido
- Starring: Stefano Accorsi; Barbora Bobuľová; Violante Placido; Stefano Dionisi
- Cinematography: Luca Bigazzi
- Release date: 2004
- Language: Italian

Ovunque sei is a 2004 Italian romance-drama film directed by Michele Placido.

It entered the competition at the 61st Venice International Film Festival, where it was booed by the audience and received bad reviews. It won the Nastro d'Argento for best cinematography.

== Cast ==
- Stefano Accorsi: Matteo
- Barbora Bobulova: Emma
- Violante Placido: Elena
- Stefano Dionisi: Leonardo
- Giuditta Saltarini: Rita
- Massimo De Francovich: Carlo
- Donato Placido: Vincenzo
- Valentina Lodovini: Francesca

== See also ==
- List of Italian films of 2004
