= Close Friends =

1992 film by Michele Placido

- Italian dvd cover
- Directed by: Michele Placido
- Written by: Roberto Nobile; Angelo Pasquini; Michele Placido
- Produced by: Giovanni Di Clemente
- Starring: Asia Argento; Claudia Pandolfi; Carlotta Natoli; Michele Placido
- Cinematography: Giuseppe Lanci
- Edited by: Ruggero Mastroianni
- Music by: Nicola Piovani
- Release date: 1992
- Country: Italy
- Language: Italian

Close Friends (Italian: Le amiche del cuore) is a 1992 Italian teen drama film directed by Michele Placido. It was entered into the Quinzaine des Réalisateurs section at the 1992 Cannes Film Festival.

== Cast ==
- Asia Argento: Simona
- Carlotta Natoli: Morena
- Claudia Pandolfi: Claudia
- Michele Placido: Father of Simona
- Enrico Lo Verso: Lucio
- Laura Trotter: Letizia
- Franco Interlenghi: Tribodi
- Simonetta Stefanelli: Giuliana, mother of Claudia
- Orchidea De Santis: Elena, mother of Morena
- Ivano De Matteo: Danilo
- Enrico Silvestrin: Cameraman
