= Soul Mate (2002 film) =

- Directed by: Sergio Rubini
- Screenplay by: Domenico Starnone; Sergio Rubini
- Starring: Violante Placido
- Cinematography: Paolo Carnera
- Music by: Pino Donaggio; Ivan Iusco
- Release date: 2002
- Language: Italian

Soul Mate (Italian: L'anima gemella) is a 2002 Italian fantasy-comedy film directed by Sergio Rubini. It is based on the novel with the same name written by Sandro Veronesi. It premiered at the 59th Venice International Film Festival.

== Cast ==
- Valentina Cervi: Teresa
- Violante Placido: Maddalena
- Michele Venitucci: Tonino
- Sergio Rubini: Angelantonio
- Dino Abbrescia: Alessandro
- Alfredo Minenna: Checco
