= Scandal in the Family (1975 film) =

- DVD cover, Jenny Tamburi (pictured)
- Directed by: Bruno Gaburro
- Written by: Lianella Carell
- Story by: Bruno Gaburro
- Produced by: Edmondo Amati
- Starring: Michele Placido; Simonetta Stefanelli; Jenny Tamburi
- Cinematography: Joe D'Amato
- Edited by: Vincenzo Tomassi
- Music by: Guido & Maurizio De Angelis
- Distributed by: Flaminia Produzioni Cinematografiche
- Release date: July 1975 (US)
- Running time: 97 minutes
- Country: Italy
- Language: Italian

Peccati in famiglia or Sins in the Family/Scandal in the Family is a 1975 Italian erotic drama film directed by Bruno Gaburro. The film starred Michele Placido, Simonetta Stefanelli, Jenny Tamburi and Renzo Montagnani.

== Plot ==
Carlo, an industrialist, arrives at his villa in Piacenza to spend the holidays with his wife Piera and his daughter Francesca. Upon arrival, he discovers that the cook - the attractive Zaira, who as a young boy he used to watch having sex and under whose covers he used to crawl during - has been replaced by Doris, a young and busty widow who he has not seen since she was a child. Carlo immediately begins to court and seduce her. After a few days Milo arrives from the South, the son of Carlo's incapable brother. He is a student, young and successful.

First, the boy conquers Francesca, who had an ambiguous relationship with her friend Fedora, then seduces Doris, whom he uses to move Uncle Carlo around, and finally Piera, who, more intelligent than her husband, is about to chase him from home.

After assuring himself of the complete dedication of the three women of the house, Milo pushes the uncle, who has a heart condition, to an excessive effort with the cook, causing him a heart attack. In this way the boy from the South inherits the villa, the factories, and the women.

== Cast ==
- Michele Placido as Milo
- Simonetta Stefanelli as Doris
- Jenny Tamburi as Francesca
- Juliette Mayniel as Piera
- Renzo Montagnani as Carlo
- Gastone Pescucci as Dr. Armando
- Laura De Marchi as Vincenza
- Corrado Olmi as Don Erminio
- Edy Williams as Zaira
