= The Man-Eater (film) =

1999 film by Aurelio Grimaldi

- Directed by: Aurelio Grimaldi
- Starring: Loredana Cannata; Arturo Paglia
- Cinematography: Massimo Intoppa
- Release date: 1999
- Running time: 80 minutes
- Language: Italian

The Man-Eater (Italian: La donna lupo, also known as Maneater) is a 1999 Italian erotic drama film written and directed by Aurelio Grimaldi.

== Cast ==
- Loredana Cannata as She-Wolf
- Arturo Paglia as Valerio
- Pascal Persiano as Pool Lover
- Francesco Di Leva as Francesco

== Production ==
In this movie, Loredana Cannata performs several unsimulated sex acts, such as fellatio, cunnilingus, and stroking the vagina with her finger.

For the infamous fellatio scene, Cannata said that she was told that it would not be simulated only the day they filmed it. Her partner in that scene, Arturo Paglia didn't feel up to doing the fellatio scene, so he was replaced by a porn actor.

Cannata also revealed that the cunnilingus she receives from Pascal Persiano in the pool scene was real.
