= Quattro bravi ragazzi =

- Directed by: Claudio Camarca
- Cinematography: Maurizio Calvesi
- Music by: Richard Horowitz
- Release date: 1993
- Language: Italian

Quattro bravi ragazzi ("Four Fine Boys") is a 1993 Italian crime-drama film written and directed by Claudio Camarca.

The film was screened in the Venetian Nights section at the 50th Venice International Film Festival.

== Cast ==
- Matteo Chioatto as René Cordaro
- Patrizio Fumagalli as Marco
- Riccardo Salerno as Giorgio Molteni
- Lorenzo Bianchi as Davide Chiarelli
- Michele Placido as "Marcione"
- Tony Sperandeo as Prof. Franchini
- Luigi Maria Burruano as René's Father
- Giancarlo Dettori as Giorgio's Father
- Nicola Pistoia as Vincenzo Sellani
- Violante Placido as Valeria

== See also ==
- List of Italian films of 1993
