= The Best Mayor, The King =

Play by Lope de Vega

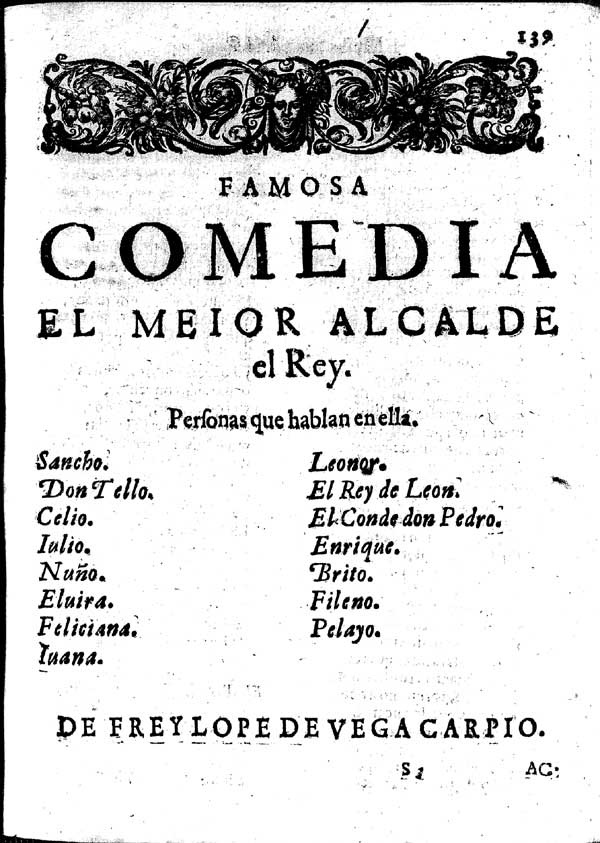
Opening of the best mayor, the king by Lope de Vega

The Best Mayor, The King (El mejor alcalde, el rey) is a play by the Spanish playwright Lope de Vega. According to the dating proposed by Morley and Bruerton, it was written between 1620 and 1623. It was published in 1635 in the twenty-first part of de Vega's comedies.

The action occurs in the early 12th century Galicia during the reign of Alfonso VII. Sancho de Roelas, a nobleman who has fallen on hard times, announces to his lord Tello de Neira his intention to marry Elvira de Olite, also of impoverished noble lineage. Don Tello offers to be best man at the wedding but on seeing Elvira falls in love with her beauty and kidnaps her. She refuses to have sex with him and Sancho travels to Leon to get Alfonso's help. Alfonso finally comes to Tello's manor-house incognito and – after revealing his identity and finding out that Tello has raped Elvira – forces him to marry Elvira. He then executes Tello, restoring Elvira's honour and endowing her with half of Tello's estate.

It is from the 'villano honrado' (honest villain) genre, which involves a peasant fighting the abuses of a nobleman and the king finally giving him justice, restoring his honour and punishing the offending nobleman with death. In this play, the villain is Sancho de Roelas and the nobleman is Don Tello or Tello de Neira, who abducts and rapes Sancho's fiancée. It is also a historical drama since (as one character states at the end of the play) it is based on an anecdote told in Florián de Ocampo's Crónica de España, which was in de Vega's time considered as an edition of the Estoria de España.

The play was adapted into the 1974 Rafael Gil film The King is the Best Mayor.
