= Simonetta Stefanelli =

Italian actress (born 1954)

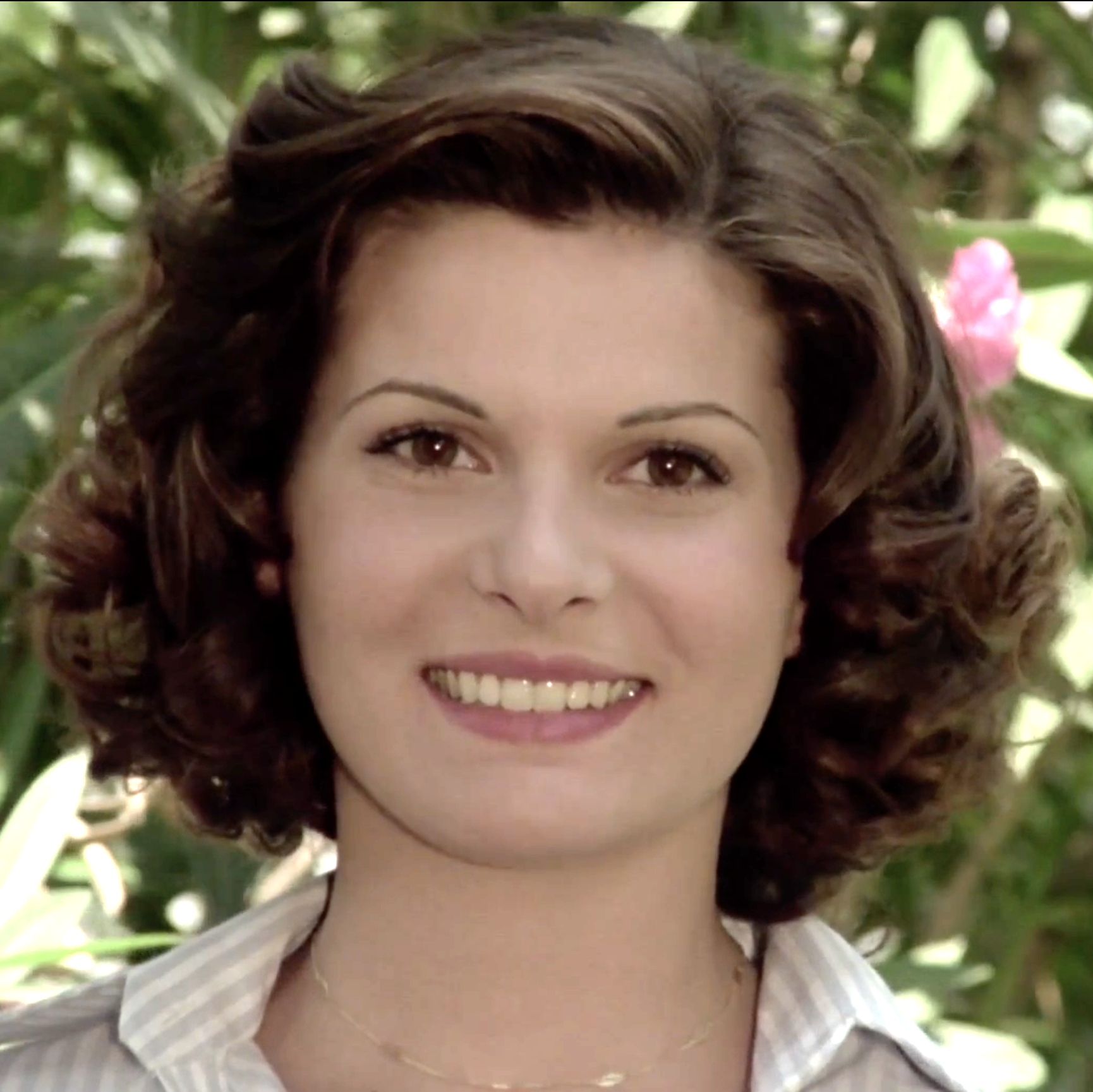
- Stefanelli in La nuora giovane (1975)
- Born: 30 November 1954 (age 71); Rome, Italy
- Occupation: Actress
- Years active: 1968–1992
- Spouse: Michele Placido (m. 1989; div. 1994)
- Children: 3, including Violante Placido

Simonetta Stefanelli (Italian pronunciation: [simoˈnetta stefaˈnɛlli]; born 30 November 1954) is an Italian former actress. Internationally, she is best known for her performance as Apollonia Vitelli in the 1972 film The Godfather, directed by Francis Ford Coppola. Her other roles include appearances in Moses the Lawgiver, Scandal in the Family and Three Brothers. In 1992, Stefanelli made her last film appearance in the drama Le amiche del cuore (Close Friends) directed by her then-husband Michele Placido.

== Personal life ==
Stefanelli was married to the actor/director Michele Placido, with whom she appeared in several films, including the 1975 erotic drama Peccati in famiglia. They had three children together, including actress Violante Placido, and divorced in 1994. Following their separation, Stefanelli and her children briefly lived in London.

A hoax stating that Stefanelli had died appeared on the Internet in 2006, and then again in 2008.

== Career ==
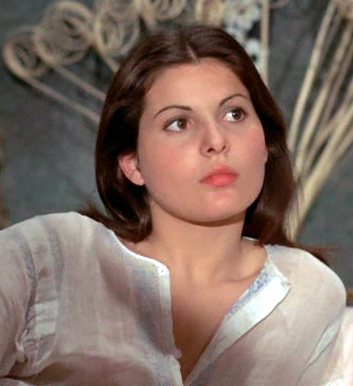
Stefanelli in In nome del popolo italiano (1971)

Before appearing in The Godfather in 1972, Stefanelli had small supporting roles in several Italian films directed by renowned Italian directors: La moglie giapponese (The Japanese Wife) by Gian Luigi Polidoro, Non commettere atti impuri (Do Not Commit Adultery) by Giulio Petroni, Homo Eroticus by Marco Vicario, and In nome del popolo italiano (In the Name of the Italian People) by Dino Risi. In 1972, she appeared in the German television film Die Sonne angreifen (To Attack the Sun) by Peter Lilienthal.

The same year, Stefanelli landed her breakout role as Apollonia Vitelli-Corleone, the doomed Sicilian wife of Michael Corleone (Al Pacino) in the American crime film The Godfather, directed by Francis Ford Coppola. Stefanelli, who was 16 at the time of filming, revealed that when filming the wedding night scene in Sicily, her gown strap slipped revealing her breasts which Coppola insisted on keeping in the scene. Her character was featured in the 1977 miniseries The Godfather: A Novel for Television.

In 1973, she posed nude in the Italian edition of Playboy, but later refused a career in Hollywood, in order to avoid being typecast and required to do nudity. She explained during an interview in 1997 about the offers of Hollywood filmmakers: "They wanted nothing more than to expose my body... I refused so much work." She continued her career in Italy. In 1973, she filmed one picture in Spanish, El mejor alcalde, el rey (The Best Mayor, the King), directed by Rafael Gil. The following year, Stefanelli appeared in the miniseries Moses the Lawgiver, starring Burt Lancaster, Anthony Quayle and Ingrid Thulin. She would later have roles in many Italian films, including Peccati in famiglia (Scandal in the Family), an erotic drama she starred in opposite her husband Michele Placido. Eriprando Visconti, Walerian Borowczyk, Franco Castellano, Giuseppe Moccia and Mario Caiano are some of the directors she worked with.

Stefanelli took a break from acting in the mid-1970s following her marriage and the birth of her daughter, Violante Placido, in 1976. She returned in the early 1980s to appear in Francesco Rosi's Tre fratelli (Three Brothers). After appearing in Michele Placido's film Le amiche del cuore (Close Friends), Stefanelli ended her acting career in 1992, just one year before her daughter began her own acting career.

After a hoax about her death surfaced online in 2007, Stefanelli stated that if a film project came along, she might participate in it. "But after my death, I don't know," she joked.

Having quit her acting career in 1992, Stefanelli owned and operated a fashion store in Rome called Simo Bloom, where she designed purses and shoes.

== Filmography ==
Title	Year	Role	Director	Notes
La moglie giapponese	1968	Girl	Gian Luigi Polidoro	
Do Not Commit Adultery	1971	Maria Teresa	Giulio Petroni	
Die Sonne angreifen	1971	Henia	Peter Lilienthal	TV film
Man of the Year	1971	Tano's Daughter	Marco Vicario	
In the Name of the Italian People	1971	Giugi Santenocito	Dino Risi	
The Godfather	1972	Apollonia Vitelli-Corleone	Francis Ford Coppola	
Il caso Pisciotta	1972	Anna	Eriprando Visconti	
Gli amici degli amici hanno saputo	1973		Fulvio Marcolin	
The King is the Best Mayor	1973	Elvira	Rafael Gil	
The Big Family	1973	Mrs. Vitale	Tonino Ricci	
La profanazione	1974		Tiziano Longo	
Ho incontrato un'ombra	1974	Gal Fabian	Daniele D'Anza	TV series; 3 episodes
Young Lucrezia	1974	Lucrezia Borgia	Luciano Ercoli	
Moses the Lawgiver	1974	Cotbi	Gianfranco De Bosio	TV miniseries
La nuora giovane	1975	Mrs. Flora	Luigi Russo	
Scandal in the Family	1975	Doris	Bruno Gaburro	
The Godfather: A Novel for Television	1977	Apollonia Vitelli-Corleone	Francis Ford Coppola	TV miniseries
Il falco e la colomba	1981	Rita Alemani	Fabrizio Lori	
Three Brothers	1983	Young Donato's wife	Francesco Rosi	
Quer pasticciaccio brutto de via Merulana	1983	Assuntina	Piero Schivazappa	TV series; 3 episodes
Ars Amandi	1985	Widow	Walerian Borowczyk	
Grandi magazzini	1986	Marisa Romano	Castellano & Pipolo	
Non basta una vita	1988	Lungo la via	Mario Caiano	TV series
Close Friends	1992	Giuliana	Michele Placido	
