= The Best Century of My Life =

2023 Italian comedy-drama film

- Theatrical release poster
- Italian: Il più bel secolo della mia vita
- Directed by: Alessandro Bardani
- Written by: Alessandro Bardani; Luigi Di Capua; Leonardo Fasoli; Maddalena Ravagli
- Based on: Il più bel secolo della mia vita by Alessandro Bardani and Luigi Di Capua
- Produced by: Gabriele Mainetti; Andrea Occhipinti; Mattia Guerra; Stefano Massenzi
- Starring: Sergio Castellitto; Valerio Lundini
- Cinematography: Timothy Aliprandi
- Edited by: Claudio Di Mauro
- Music by: Francesco Cerasi
- Production companies: Goon Films; Lucky Red; Rai Cinema
- Distributed by: Lucky Red
- Release dates: 23 July 2023 (Giffoni); 7 September 2023 (Italy)
- Running time: 83 minutes
- Country: Italy
- Language: Italian
- Budget: €2.6 million
- Box office: €337,723 ($325,375)

The Best Century of My Life (Italian: Il più bel secolo della mia vita) is a 2023 Italian comedy-drama film directed by Alessandro Bardani in his feature film directorial debut, based on the play of the same name by Bardani and Luigi Di Capua, which also penned the screenplay alongside Leonardo Fasoli and Maddalena Ravagli. It stars Sergio Castellitto as Gustavo, a centenarian who never met his biological parents, and Valerio Lundini as an adoptee rights activist who uses him to circumvent a law preventing adopted children from learning the identity of their biological parents until they turn 100 years old. It was the final film role of actress Sandra Milo before her death in 2024.

The film premiered in competition at the 53rd Giffoni Film Festival on 23 July 2023, before being released on 7 September 2023 by Lucky Red. It was a box office bomb, grossing €337,723 on a budget of €2.6 million.

== Plot ==
Giovanni, a 34-year-old volunteer of the Adopted Children & Parents Association (FAeGN), finds out he's adopted and begins drifting away from his mother Gianna. After finding out that an obscure law prevents him from ever learning the identity of his biological parents before turning 100 years old, Giovanni seeks the help of Gustavo, the only living adopted centenarian in Italy. Giovanni travels with wheelchair-using Gustavo from his Tuscan hospice to the Ministry of the Interior in Rome, where they'll be handed the file. Giovanni hopes this stunt will help him to raise awareness of his predicament to the larger public, but he finds it difficult to bond with the curmudgeonly old man at first.

However, once presented with the file containing his biological mother's name, Gustavo refuses to open it, stating that she gave him up for adoption at birth and so won't ever be his "real mother," unlike the woman who raised him. Albeit disappointed with the outcome, Giovanni is struck by Gustavo's words, recognizing he'd been treating Gianna unfairly. Gustavo eventually accepts to open his file to help with Giovanni's pet cause, but also to know his biological mother's face. At the cemetery, Giovanni finds her gravestone first—one without any photograph. Before Gustavo sees that, he places a photo from a nearby gravestone on it, providing the latter a much-needed closure: the old man reconciles with his mother and forgives her.

== Cast ==
- Sergio Castellitto as Gustavo Diotallevi
  - Marzio El Moety as Gustavo as a child
- Valerio Lundini as Giovanni Andreasi
- Carla Signoris as Gianna
- Antonio Zavatteri as FAeGN President
- Elena Lander as Alina
- Betty Pedrazzi as Grazia
- Sandra Milo as J.O.

== Release ==
The Best Century of My Life had its world premiere on 23 July 2023 as part of the Generator+18 platform of the 53rd Giffoni Film Festival, winning the Best Feature Award of the section where it competed.

It was theatrically released in Italy on 7 September 2023 by Lucky Red.

== Reception ==
The Best Century of My Life emerged as a box office bomb, grossing just €337,723 (or $325,375) domestically, on a budget of €2.6 million.

== Accolades ==
Award	Date of ceremony	Category	Recipient	Result	Ref.
Giffoni Film Festival	30 July 2023	Generator+18 Award	The Best Century of My Life	Won	
David di Donatello	3 May 2024	Best Original Song	"La vita com'è" – Brunori Sas	Nominated	
Nastro d'Argento	27 June 2024	Best Original Song	"La vita com'è" – Brunori Sas	Nominated	
