= Do Not Commit Adultery =

1971 comedy film

- Directed by: Giulio Petroni
- Written by: Giulio Petroni; Marco Zavattini
- Starring: Barbara Bouchet; Dado Crostarosa; Simonetta Stefanelli
- Cinematography: Antonio Secchi
- Edited by: Roberto Colangeli
- Music by: Riz Ortolani
- Distributed by: Multicom Entertainment Group
- Release date: 1971
- Country: Italy
- Language: Italian

Do Not Commit Adultery (Italian: Non commettere atti impuri) is a 1971 commedia sexy all'italiana co-written and directed by Giulio Petroni.

== Cast ==
- Barbara Bouchet as Nadine
- Dado Crostarosa as Pino Liguori
- Simonetta Stefanelli as Maria Teresa
- Marisa Merlini as Maria Teresa's Mother
- Claudio Gora as Uncle Giacomo
- Luciano Salce as Damiano Liguori
- Gigi Ballista as Father Spiridione
- Franco Balducci as Accountant

== Production ==
The film was produced by Avalea Film. It was shot in Assisi. It is based on the Petroni's short story La crisi mistica ('The mystical crisis'), published in the late 1960s in the magazine Athos. It marked the official debut of Simonetta Stefanelli.

== Release ==
The film was released in Italian cinemas by P.A.C. in November 1971.

== Reception ==
La Stampa described the film as "a lightweight '50s-style comedy, refreshed with the permissive nudity of the '70s", in which "the director's touch feels weak and unfocused."
