= Loredana Cannata =

Italian actress

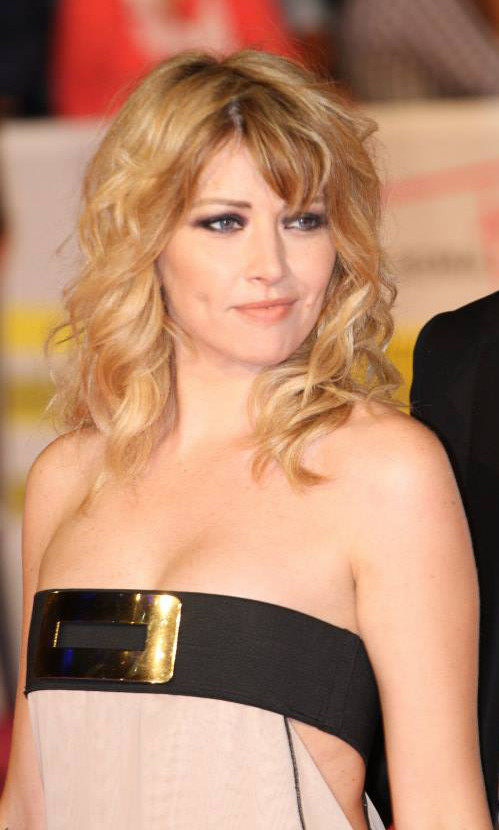
- Cannata at Roma Film Fest (2013)
- Born: 14 July 1975 (age 50); Giarratana, Ragusa, Italy
- Occupation: Actress
- Years active: 1999–present
- Website: www.loredanacannata.com

Loredana Cannata (born 14 July 1975) is an Italian actress.

== Biography ==
Born in Ragusa, Italy, Cannata studied acting while growing up in her native Sicily. She started early on to play leading roles in several stage plays, some of which based on works by Luigi Pirandello (Liolà), Euripides (The Trojan Women) and Arthur Schnitzler (La Ronde). In 1999 she made her film debut in The Man-Eater directed by Aurelio Grimaldi.

Cannata has also appeared in numerous television series throughout her career. Since 2001 she has been starring, alongside Italian actor Sebastiano Somma, in Un caso di coscienza, a long running TV series broadcast on Rai Uno, one of Italy's state owned channels. Un caso di coscienza is now in its fifth season. She was cast in the 2005-2006 Italian edition of Strictly Come Dancing. She came back to the movies in 2012 with "Magnifica presenza", directed by Ferzan Ozpetek and "The Early Years" directed by Paolo Sorrentino in 2015.

Additionally, Cannata is president of "Sesto Sole" (6th Sun), an Italian charity organization that provides health related help to the indigenous population of the Chiapas. She is vegan and supports animals rights. In 2003 she directed the documentary Insurgentes about the Mexican Revolution, and in 2006, she directed another documentary about the Zapatists.

== Filmography ==
=== Film ===
Year	Title	Role	Notes
1999	The Man-Eater	Giulia	
2001	Gabriele	Delfina	
2002	Senso '45	Ninetta	
2003	Sotto gli occhi di tutti	Patrizia	
2008	Albakiara	Agent Maria Berti	
2012	Magnificent Presence	Casting Director	Cameo appearance
2015	Youth	South American's Wife	Cameo appearance
2016	La crisi	Tiziana	Short film
2016	È stato un piacere	Gaia	Short film
2017	Metti una notte	Linda's Mother	
2017	Naples in Veils	Liliana	
2018	Bloody Shadow	Sarah	
2019	The Goddess of Fortune	Melina	
2021	Fade Out	Psychologist	
2024	Diamonds	Rita	

=== Television ===
Year	Title	Role	Notes
1999	Villa Ada	Young Girl	Television movie
2001	La casa delle beffe	Norina	Two-parts television movie
2001	La voce del sangue	Teresa Magarino	Two-parts television movie
2002–2003	Il bello delle donne	Elena Parodi	Main role (season 2-3)
2003–2013	Un caso di coscienza	Alice Morandi	Main role
2004	Madame	Cosima	Television movie
2005	La caccia	Michela	Two-parts television movie
2007	Exodus: Il sogno di Ada	Magda	Two-parts television movie
2007	Finalmente Natale	Cinzia	Television movie
2008	Finalmente a casa	Cinzia	Television movie
2008	Provaci ancora prof!	Susanna Moretti	Recurring role (season 3)
2011	Viso d'angelo	Gloria Maselli	Miniseries
2015	Questo è il mio paese	Gina	Main role
2024	Libera	Eleonora Gregori	Recurring role

== Stage ==
- Liolà, Luigi Pirandello (1993–94)
- The Trojan Women, Euripides (1996)
- All' uscita, L. Pirandello (1996)
- La Ronde, Arthur Schnitzler, director A. Marziantonio (1997)
- Orgasmica Soirée, regia di F. Soldi (1999)
- Benzina, director Daniele Falleri (2001)
- Per il resto tutto bene, director Claudio Boccaccini (2010-2011)
- Una donna di Ragusa - Maria Occhipinti, director Loredana Cannata (2011-2012-2015)
- (Odio) gli indifferenti 02/06/05, written and directed by herself (2012)
- "Marilyn - Her words", written and directed by herself (2014-2015)
