= Un caso di coscienza (TV series) =

- Created by: Luigi Perelli
- Country of origin: Italy
- Original language: Italian
- No. of seasons: 5
- No. of episodes: 30

Production
- Camera setup: Luigi Perelli
- Running time: 95 min (episodes)

Original release
- Network: Rai 1, Rai 2

Un caso di coscienza is an Italian television series. This series of legal thriller genres, is composed of 5 seasons, each consisting of 6 episodes from the life of about 95 minutes each. With regard to the first season aired on Rai 2, the following went on air on Rai 1.

The series is directed by Luigi Perelli, played by Sebastiamo Somma, Loredana Cannata, Stephan Danailov and Barbara Livi, producend by Mario Rossini for Red Film and Rai Fiction in collaboration with the Friuli-Venezia Giulia Film Commission, as it is set and filmed primarily in Trieste.

In May 2012, begin filming the fifth season of the drama. All the cast is confirmed with the new entry of Vittoria Belvedere.

== Cast ==
- Sebastiano Somma : Avv. Rocco Tasca
- Loredana Cannata : Alice Morandi
- Stephan Danailov : Virgilio
- Barbara Livi : Erica Lacerba
- Karen Ciaurro : Eva Tasca
- Philipe Boa : Louis
- Silvia Gavarotti : Lidia
- David Coco : Stefano Croce
