= Eternal Visionary =

2024 drama film

- Directed by: Michele Placido
- Written by: Michele Placido; Toni Trupia; Matteo Collura
- Starring: Fabrizio Bentivoglio; Valeria Bruni Tedeschi; Federica Vincenti; Giancarlo Commare; Aurora Giovinazzo; Michelangelo Placido; Ute Lemper; Michele Placido
- Cinematography: Michele D'Attanasio
- Edited by: Consuelo Catucci
- Music by: Oragravity
- Distributed by: 01 Distribution
- Release date: 2024
- Language: Italian

Eternal Visionary (Italian: Eterno visionario) is a 2024 Italian biographical drama film co-written and directed by Michele Placido. It recounts Luigi Pirandello's journey to Stockholm to receive the 1934 Nobel Prize in Literature, as well as his turbulent love life.

== Cast ==
- Fabrizio Bentivoglio as Luigi Pirandello
- Valeria Bruni Tedeschi as Antonietta Portulano
- Federica Vincenti as Marta Abba
- Giancarlo Commare as Stefano Pirandello
- Aurora Giovinazzo as Lietta Pirandello
- Michelangelo Placido as Fausto Pirandello
- Michele Placido as Saul Colin
- Mino Manni as Massimo Bontempelli
- Anna Gargano as Cele Abba
- Marcello Mazzarella as Luigi Almirante
- Dajana Roncione as Vera Vergani
- Guia Jelo as the mother
- Edoardo Purgatori as Friedrich Wilhelm Murnau
- Ute Lemper as Kasanova's singer

== Production ==
The film was produced by Goldenart Production and Rai Cinema, with GapBusters serving as co-producer. It had a budget of €12.5 million.

== Release ==
It premiered at the 19th Rome Film Festival. It was released in Italian cinemas on 7 November 2024.
