= Valerio Lundini =

Italian comedian, actor and TV host (born 1986)

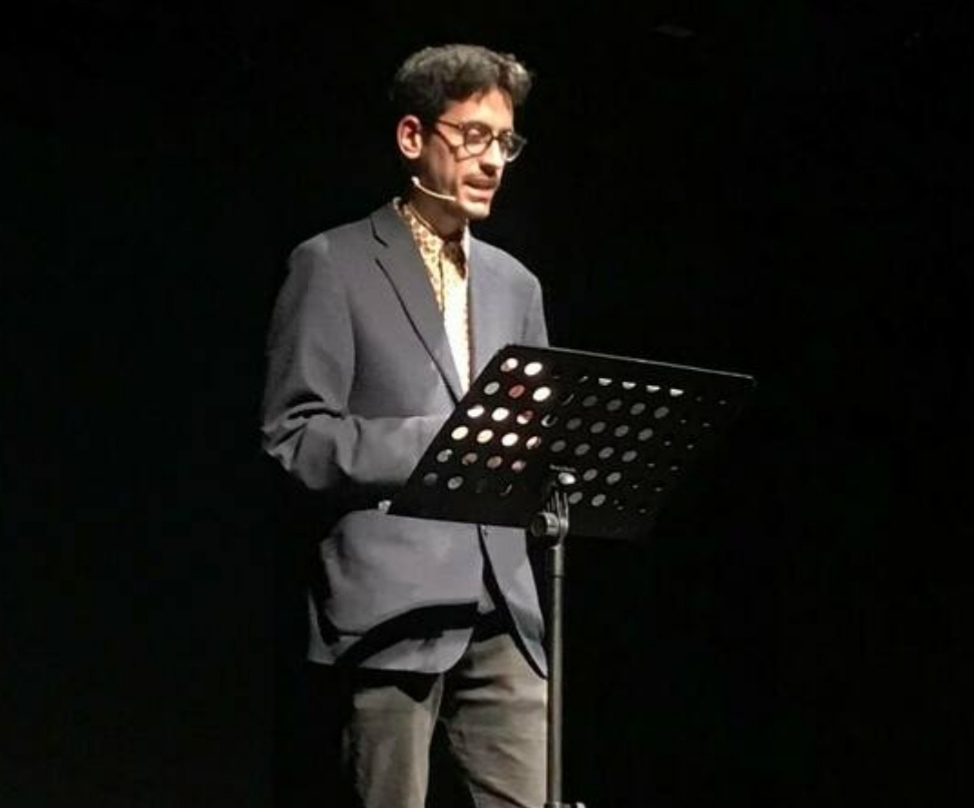
- Lundini in 2021
- Born: 11 March 1986 (age 40); Rome, Italy
- Occupations: Comedian, actor, TV host, screenwriter
- Years active: 2018–present

Valerio Lundini (born 11 March 1986) is an Italian comedian, actor, television host and screenwriter.

== Life and career ==
After earning a degree in literature at the Roma Tre University and a diploma from the Roman School of Comics, Lundini worked as a writer for radio and TV programs like 610 by Lillo & Greg, and Programmone by Nino Frassica. In 2020, he co-hosted L'altro Festival, a side show of the Sanremo Music Festival 2020 on RaiPlay. That same year, he debuted as the main host of Una pezza di Lundini on Rai 2.

In 2021, he appeared as a guest during the third evening of the Sanremo Music Festival, performing alongside Fulminacci and Roy Paci in a cover of Jovanotti's "Penso positivo". That year, Lundini also released his first book, Era meglio il libro, by Rizzoli. In 2022, he toured with theatrical shows and performed with his band I VazzaNikki, appearing at major events like the Concerto del Primo Maggio.

In 2023, he debuted in his first leading role in a feature film, The Best Century of My Life, opposite Sergio Castellitto. In 2024, he launched his second show, Faccende complicate, on RaiPlay and later Rai 3.

In 2026, Lundini made his feature film directorial debut with Cambogia, which he also co-wrote and starred in. The film premiered at the 21st Rome Film Festival in the Freestyle section.

== Filmography ==
Film
Year	Title	Role	Notes
2019	Biagio - Una storia vera	Cineclub's owner	Short film
2020	Nel bagno delle donne	Opinionist	
2022	Italian Gigolo	Paolo	
2023	The Best Century of My Life	Giovanni Andreasi	
2025	Siblings	Himself	
2025	Love in Separate Beds	Himself	
2026	Cambogia	Valerio De Nicolais / Tramezzino	Also director and writer

Television
Year	Title	Role	Notes
2023	Sono Lillo	Himself	Episode: "Episodio 1"
2025	Sconfort Zone	Valerio	TV series; main role

== Television programs ==
- Battute? (Rai 2, 2019)
- CCN - Il salotto con Michela Giraud (Comedy Central, 2020–2021)
- Una pezza di Lundini (Rai 2, 2020–2022)
- Concerto del Primo Maggio (Rai 3, 2022)
- Faccende complicate (RaiPlay, 2024)

== Works ==
- Valerio Lundini (2021). Era meglio il libro. Milan: Rizzoli.
- Valerio Lundini (2022). Foto mosse di famiglie immobili. Milan: Rizzoli.
