= The King is the Best Mayor =

1974 film by Rafael Gil

- Theatrical film poster
- Directed by: Rafael Gil
- Based on: The Best Mayor, The King by Lope de Vega
- Starring: Analía Gadé; Simonetta Stefanelli; Ray Lovelock
- Cinematography: José F. Aguayo
- Edited by: Giantito Burchiellaro
- Music by: Salvador Ruiz de Luna
- Production companies: Compagnia Cinematografica Champion; Coral Producciones Cinematográficas; Midega Film
- Release date: 29 April 1974
- Running time: 95 minutes
- Countries: Italy; Spain
- Language: Spanish

The King is the Best Mayor (Italian: Il miglior sindaco, il re, Spanish: El mejor alcalde, el rey) is a 1974 Italian-Spanish historical drama film directed by Rafael Gil and starring Analía Gadé, Simonetta Stefanelli and Ray Lovelock.

The film is based on the play The Best Mayor, The King by Lope de Vega, who is considered part of the Spanish Golden Age of literature.

== Cast ==
- Analía Gadé as Felicia
- Simonetta Stefanelli as Elvira
- Ray Lovelock as Sancho
- Fernando Sancho as Conde
- Andrés Mejuto as The King
- Pedro Valentín as Pelayo
- José Nieto as Nuño
- Antonio Casas as Celio
- Tomás Blanco as Alcalde
- Alejandro de Enciso as Julio
- Luis Induni as D. Enrique
- Fernando Sánchez Polack as Yuntero
- Rafael Corés as Obispo
