= Freaks Out =

2021 Italian drama film

- Early teaser poster
- Directed by: Gabriele Mainetti
- Written by: Gabriele Mainetti; Nicola Guaglianone
- Produced by: Gabriele Mainetti; Andrea Occhipinti
- Starring: Claudio Santamaria; Pietro Castellitto; Giancarlo Martini; Aurora Giovinazzo; Giorgio Tirabassi; Max Mazzotta; Franz Rogowski
- Cinematography: Michele D'Attanasio
- Edited by: Francesco Di Stefano
- Music by: Michele Braga; Gabriele Mainetti
- Production companies: Goon Films; Lucky Red; Rai Cinema
- Release dates: 8 September 2021 (Venice); 28 October 2021
- Running time: 141 minutes
- Countries: Italy, Belgium
- Languages: Italian, German
- Budget: €12 million

Freaks Out, also known as Freaks vs. the Reich, is a 2021 Italian historical-fantasy drama film directed by Gabriele Mainetti.

It was entered in the main competition at the 78th Venice International Film Festival. It received mostly positive reviews, with critics praising the acting, cinematography, production value and themes, but some criticism towards excessive length and lack of focus. It won the Leoncino d'Oro award at the 78th Venice Film Festival, and the VriendenLoterij Audience Award at the 51st Rotterdam Film Festival.

== Plot ==
In 1943, in the middle of World War II, Circus Mezzapiotta, owned by a Jew called Israel, is putting on shows.

Four freaks perform there: Matilde, a girl who produces electricity and electrocutes anyone who touches her; Cencio, an albino boy who can control all insects; Fulvio, a "man-beast" with hypertrichosis, and therefore covered in hair from head to toe, endowed with superhuman strength; and finally Mario, a person with dwarfism and an intellectual disability and the ability to manipulate metal objects. The worsening of the conflict puts the survival of the Circus at risk, so Israel proposes that the four of them attempt to travel to America; Fulvio, on the other hand, proposes that they find work at the prestigious Berlin Zircus, a sumptuous show put on by the Nazis who have occupied Rome. The Zircus is actually the realm of Franz, a German pianist with six fingers on each hand who possesses clairvoyant powers: he had a premonition of Hitler's suicide and the arrival of four beings with superhuman powers that could save the fate of the Third Reich (as well as various events and inventions that will happen in the years following the end of the conflict); for this reason he created the Zircus in order to gather all the freaks in the area, who undergo deadly torture in an attempt to identify the saviors.

Israel manages to convince the four freaks to leave for America, but after collecting their savings he disappears. After fortunately escaping a roundup in an attempt to go looking for him in Rome, the four decide to separate: Matilde, the only one who believes in Israel's good faith, leaves to look for him, while the other three go to the Berlin Zircus. Matilde avoids an attempted rape by a German soldier, and saves herself by electrocuting him with her powers; she is then saved by a shabby group of partisans led by the Hunchback, who tries to use her power for their cause. Thanks to their help, Matilde manages to track down Israel aboard a truck on its way to the concentration camps, but she is unable to save him because she is unable to control her power, nor to use it to harm anyone. She will later reveal to the Hunchback that she had unintentionally killed her own mother, which led her to fear herself and her power.

Fulvio, Mario and Cencio are hired at the Berlin Zircus, where they attract the attention of Franz, who subjects them to painful tortures. Matilde is informed by Guercio, another partisan, of the real purpose of the Zircus, and leaves to save her friends; however, she is captured by Franz, who begins to believe that the four freaks are the ones who appeared in his vision; so he organizes a big show to show them to his brother Amon and to Field Marshal Kesselring, in order to convince them to employ them in the War. During the show Franz tries to force Matilde to electrocute a tiger, but the girl is able for the first time to control her power and manages to save the animal instead; humiliated and mocked, Franz condemns the four freaks to the stake. Matilde, however, succeeds in blowing up the door of their cell, and the four friends leave to save Israel, who is traveling on one of the death trains. Learning of their escape, Franz realizes that the four are in fact the ones he is looking for, and that destiny will be fulfilled at a train station he saw in a premonition. In pursuit of them, the German kills Amon and assumes his identity, wearing his uniform and even cutting off his excessive fingers, and then places himself at the head of the army.

Using all their powers, the four friends manage to defeat the German soldiers and save Israel and the other Jews, but are immediately attacked by the army led by Franz. Despite the intervention of the Hunchback's partisans and the powers of the four freaks, the Germans seem to prevail. When Israel sacrifices himself to save her life, Matilde finally succeeds in taking full control of her power and concentrates it in a huge explosion of energy, which annihilates all the German soldiers. While witnessing the death of his fiancée Irina, Franz understands that his vision was not about Hitler's suicide, but his own: in fact, shortly after, realizing that his plan failed, he kills himself. The four freaks, finally free, can start traveling again.

== Cast ==
- Claudio Santamaria as Fulvio
- Pietro Castellitto as Cencio
- Giancarlo Martini as Mario
- Aurora Giovinazzo as Matilde
- Giorgio Tirabassi as Israel
- Max Mazzotta as The Hunchback
- Franz Rogowski as Franz

== Release ==
Originally set to be released on 22 October 2020, the date was delayed to 16 December, and then pushed back again due to the second wave of the COVID-19 pandemic in Italy. The film was finally scheduled to be released on 28 October 2021.

It was released in North America by VMI Releasing, as Freaks Vs. The Reich, on April 28, 2023.

in Japan it received a public release as the original title “Freaks Out”

== Reception ==
On review aggregator Rotten Tomatoes, the film holds an approval rating of 71% based on 21 reviews, with an average rating of 8.2/10. On Metacritic, the film has a weighted average score of 42 out of 100, based on 6 critics, indicating "mixed or average reviews".
