= My Family (Malaysian TV series) =

- Country of origin: Malaysia
- Original language: Mandarin
- No. of episodes: 20

Production
- Running time: approx. 45 minutes

Original release
- Network: ntv7
- Release: 2012 – 2012

My Family is a Malaysian Chinese drama co-produced by ntv7 and mm2 Entertainment. It was filmed in 2009 and aired on ntv7 starting 30 April 2012, at 6:00pm.
