= Enrico Brizzi =

Italian writer

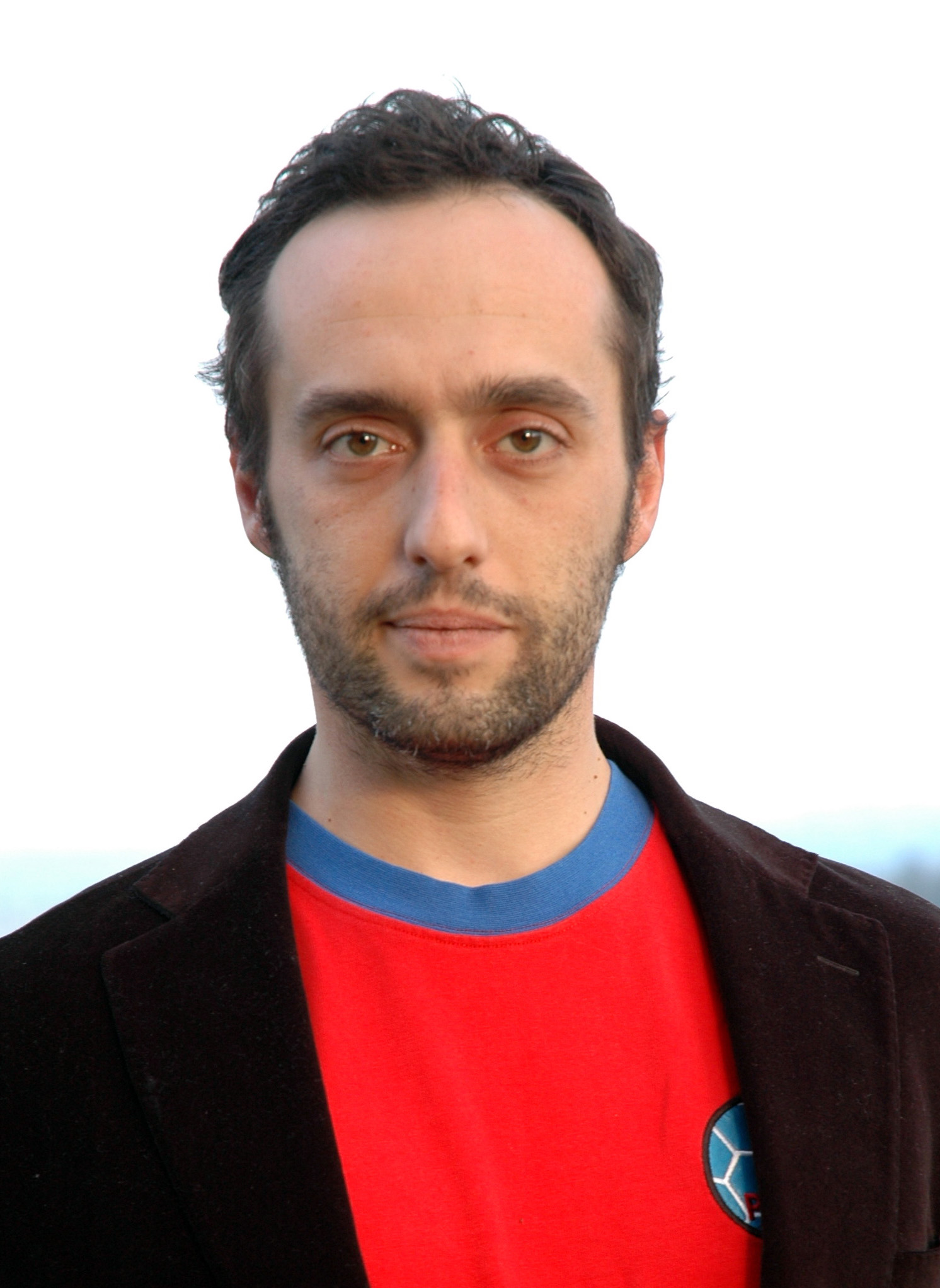
Enrico Brizzi (2007)

Enrico Brizzi (born in Bologna, November 20, 1974) is an Italian writer. He is best known for his debut novel Jack Frusciante Has Left the Band, which is so far the only one translated into English (along with other 23 languages). It also inspired the same name Italian movie in 1996.

Brizzi then published Bastogne, translated to French, German and Spanish, and five more novels for major Italian publishers; the most recent in 2005, Nessuno lo saprà - Viaggio a piedi dall'Argentario al Conero, based on a real life experience of a trekking through Tuscany, Umbria and the Marches from the Tyrrhenian Sea coast to the Adriatic Sea.

In Italy, he's one of the most popular authors of his generation, and in 1999 he was elected with José Carreras, Ennio Morricone and seven other Italian celebrities to form "the ten quality judges' board" in Italy's biggest music event, the Festival di Sanremo.

In 2006 Brizzi walked (and biked) for three months from Canterbury to Rome along the ancient pilgrims' path known as Via Francigena. His reportage was published in issues 30-34 of the leading Italian weekly magazine L'espresso.

In 2008 a new trip brought Brizzi from Rome to Jerusalem, walking in southern Italy on the ancient Via Appia, and in Israel on the Israel National Trail. His reportage was published in the Italian edition of Condé Nast Traveler monthly magazine.

In 2024 he announced the sequel of Jack Frusciante has left the bandArticle on La Stampa.

== Bibliography ==
=== Novels ===
- Jack Frusciante Has Left the Band (Transeuropa, Ancona, 1994; English version: Flamingo, London, 1998)
- Bastogne (Baldini & Castoldi, Milano, 1996)
- Tre ragazzi immaginari (Baldini & Castoldi, Milano, 1998)
- Elogio di Oscar Firmian e del suo impeccabile stile (Baldini & Castoldi, Milano, 1999)
- L'altro nome del rock (with Lorenzo Marzaduri) (Mondadori, Milano, 2001)
- Razorama (Mondadori, Milano, 2003)
- Nessuno lo saprà - Viaggio a piedi dall'Argentario al Conero (Mondadori, Milano, 2005)
- Il pellegrino dalle braccia d’inchiostro (Mondadori, Milano, 2007)
- Gli psicoatleti, (Dalai, Milano, 2011)
- Il matrimonio di mio fratello, (Mondadori, Milano, 2015)
- Tu che sei di me la miglior parte, (Mondadori, Milano, 2018)
- La primavera perfetta (HarperCollins, Milano, 2021)

==== Epopea Fantastorica Italiana ====
- L’inattesa piega degli eventi (Baldini Castoldi Dalai, Milano, 2008)
- La Nostra guerra (Baldini Castoldi Dalai, Milano, 2009)
- Lorenzo Pellegrini e le donne (Italica, Bologna, 2012)

=== Comics and graphic novels ===
- Lennon Guevara Bugatti (illustrated by Sauro Ciantini) (Comix, Modena, 1996)
- Apriti Sesamo - La vera storia di Alì Babà e i quaranta ladroni (illustrated by Bonvi) (Chiaroscuro-Pendragon, Bologna, 2005)
- Bastogne (illustrated by Maurizio Manfredi) (Baldini Castoldi Dalai editore, Milano, 2006)
- Il pellegrino dalle braccia d’inchiostro (illustrated by Maurizio Manfredi) (Rizzoli Lizard, Milano, 2009)

== Filmography ==
Enrico Brizzi is credited along with director Enza Negroni, Massimo Canalini and Ennio Montanari as writer for the movie Jack Frusciante è uscito dal gruppo (Italy, 1996).

== Discography ==
Enrico Brizzi & Frida X, Nessuno lo saprà. Reading per voce e rock 'n' roll band (Black Candy records, 2006). 70 minutes audio CD from the 2005-2006 reading tour with the Italian band Frida X.

== Awards ==
For Jack Frusciante Has Left the Band:

- Finalist for the Campiello Prize (1995)
- Bergamo Prize (1995)
- Fregene Prize - Young Narrative, First Work (1996)

For The Pilgrim with Ink Arms:

- Procida-Isola di Arturo-Elsa Morante Prize (2007)

For The Unexpected Twist of Events:

- Finalist for the Dessì Prize (2008)

For Standing on the Pedals:

- Bancarella Sport Prize (2015)
