= Jack Frusciante Has Left the Band =

1994 novel by Enrico Brizzi

Jack Frusciante Has Left the Band (Italian: Jack Frusciante è uscito dal gruppo) is Enrico Brizzi's debut novel. Brizzi wrote it at the age of eighteen and it was first published in 1994. The name "Jack Frusciante" is a deliberate modification of John Frusciante, the guitarist from Red Hot Chili Peppers.

The novel, first published by independent Ancona-based Transeuropa, went out of print 15 times before the rights to it were sold to more solid publishers.

As of 1999, the novel had sold over one million copies in Italy and had been published in 23 countries throughout Europe, in the US, Japan, Korea and South America.

A film based on the novel was released in 1996, with Brizzi contributing to the screenplay.

In 2024, Brizzi announced a sequel to the novel.

== Plot ==
Jack Frusciante Has Left the Band tells the story of the relationship between Alex, a 17-year-old rebel, and Aidi (which sounds like the German name Heidi), a girl who enters his life out of the blue one Sunday with a phone call. She asks about a poetry book and they end up talking about their projects and aspirations. Before they part she kisses him on the cheek. Alex falls for her, and later asks her to be his girlfriend. She begins behaving increasingly coldly to him until she states that she doesn't want any relationship because she'll be leaving for the States the following year and doesn't want to be in a long-distance relationship. Alex accepts her decision. Nonetheless, they maintain a relationship that, though not full-blown love, is stronger than mere friendship. Meanwhile, Alex takes a position in opposition to bourgeois society, rejecting the commonplace life that everyone expects him to be leading in the future ("a car, two children, a wife and a business consultant") and befriending Martino, the son of a rich family but an "outcast" like Alex himself.

== Editions ==
- Enrico Brizzi, Jack Frusciante Has Left the Band, London, Harper Collins, 1996.
- Enrico Brizzi, Jack Frusciante Has Left the Band, New York, Grove Press, 1997.
- Enrico Brizzi, Jack Frusciante Has Left the Band (Paperback), Flamingo, 1998. ISBN 978-0-00-655046-4
