= My Family (Italian TV series) =

Italian television series (2025)

- Storia della mia famiglia
- Genre: Family drama
- Starring: Eduardo Scarpetta; Vanessa Scalera; Massimiliano Caiazzo; Cristiana Dell'Anna; Gaia Weiss; Antonio Gargiulo
- Country of origin: Italy
- Original language: Italian
- No. of seasons: 1
- No. of episodes: 6

Production
- Running time: 41–51 minutes

Original release
- Network: Netflix
- Release: 19 February 2025 – present

My Family (Italian: Storia della mia famiglia, lit. 'My family history') is an Italian family drama television series created by Filippo Gravino and directed by Claudio Cupellini. Produced by Palomar, the first season consists of six episodes and was released on Netflix on 19 February 2025.

== Premise ==
Fausto, a father facing a terminal illness, tries to ensure long-term care for his two young sons by relying on a small group of relatives and friends who have longstanding tensions among them.

== Cast and characters ==
- Eduardo Scarpetta as Fausto
- Vanessa Scalera as Lucia (Fausto's mother)
- Massimiliano Caiazzo as Valerio (Fausto's brother)
- Cristiana Dell'Anna as Maria
- Gaia Weiss as Sarah
- Antonio Gargiulo as Demetrio
- Filippo Gili as Sergio
- Jua Leo Migliore as Libero
- Tommaso Guidi as Ercole
- Aurora Giovinazzo as Valeria

== Production ==
=== Development and writing ===
In September 2023, Netflix included Storia della mia famiglia in its announced slate of Italian productions; Cupellini was attached as director and Gravino as creator and writer, with Palomar producing.

== Release ==
The first season premiered on Netflix on 19 February 2025.

== Reception ==
My Family received generally positive reviews from television critics. In a review for Movieplayer.it, the series was described as balancing drama with lighter elements while focusing on its characters and their relationships. Writing for GQ Italia, the series was noted for framing its premise around grief and continuity rather than only tragedy. MYmovies.it highlighted the ensemble cast and the show's attention to multiple characters' storylines, while also commenting on its use of music cues. In an English-language review, Decider compared its storytelling devices to other family dramas and noted its emphasis on emotional continuity over plot twists. Io Donna television critic Aldo Grasso characterised the series as a restrained family drama focused on relationships beyond biological ties.

== Future ==
In March 2025, Netflix confirmed the series had been renewed for a second season. According to Italy for Movies, production on the second season began in May 2025, with Cupellini and Marco Danieli as directors.
