= Michele Placido =

Italian actor and film director

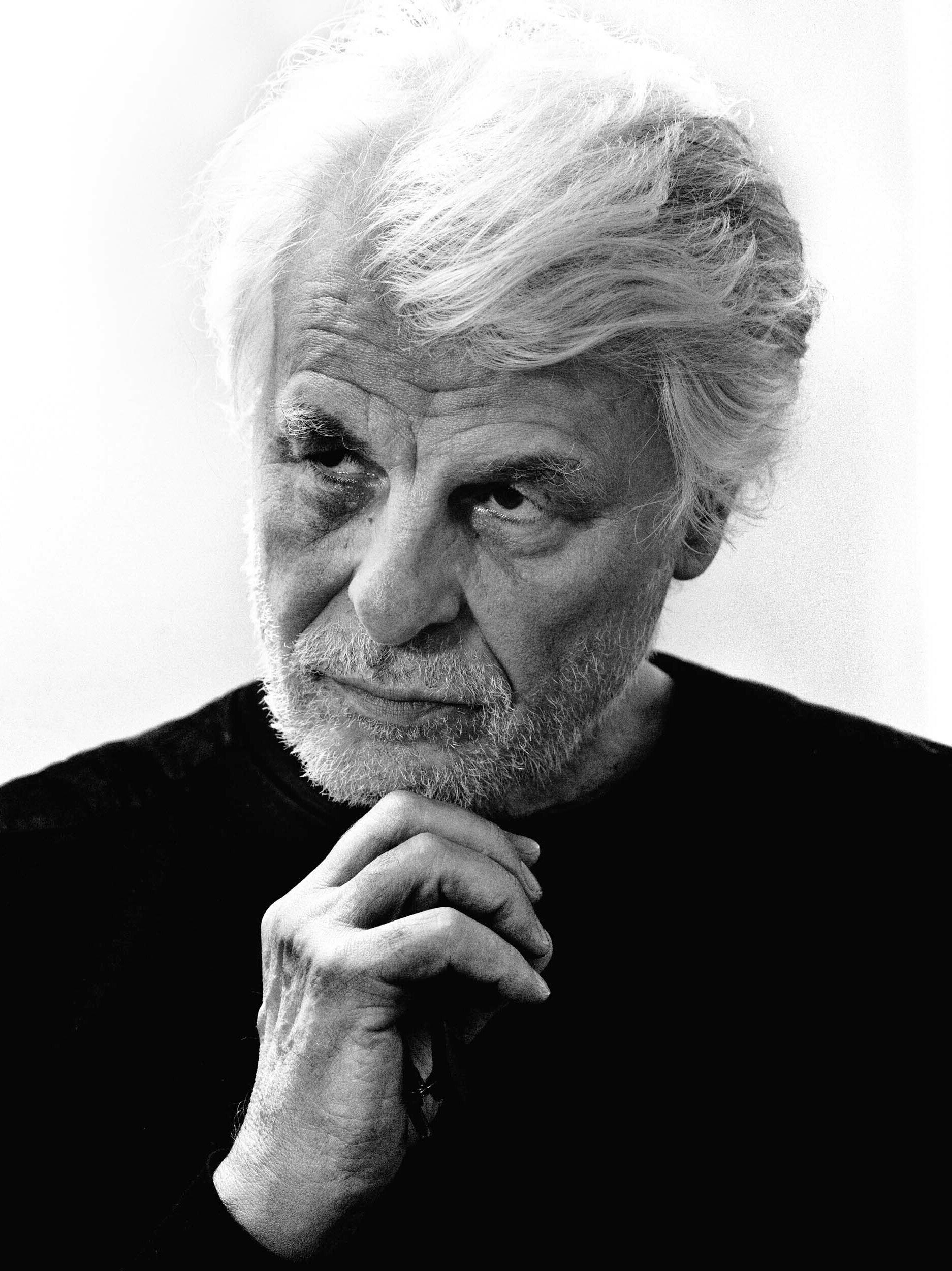
- Born: 19 May 1946 (age 80); Ascoli Satriano, Apulia, Italy
- Education: Accademia Nazionale di Arte Drammatica Silvio D'Amico
- Occupations: Actor; film director; screenwriter
- Years active: 1972–present
- Spouses: Simonetta Stefanelli (m. 1989; div. 1994) Federica Vincenti (m. 2012; div. 2017)
- Children: 4, including Violante
- Relatives: Gerardo Amato (brother)

Michele Placido (Italian: [miˈkɛːle ˈplaːtʃido]; born 19 May 1946) is an Italian actor, director and screenwriter. He began his career on stage, and first gained mainstream attention through a series of roles in films directed by the likes of Mario Monicelli and Marco Bellocchio, winning the Berlinale's Silver Bear for Best Actor for his performance in the 1979 film Ernesto. He is known internationally for portraying police inspector Corrado Cattani on the crime drama television series La piovra (1984–2001). Placido's directorial debut, Pummarò, was screened Un Certain Regard at the 1990 Cannes Film Festival. Three of his films have competed for the Golden Lion at the Venice Film Festival. He is a five-time Nastro d'Argento and four-time David di Donatello winner. In 2021, Placido was appointed President of the Teatro Comunale in Ferrara.

== Early life ==
Placido was born at Ascoli Satriano, into a poor family from Rionero in Vulture, Basilicata; he is a descendant of the known brigand Carmine Crocco. Placido had a number of jobs since his youth. For a time, he worked as a police officer in Rome, and was involved in the Battle of Valle Giulia. He studied acting at the Centro Sperimentale di Cinematografia in Rome, and with Silvio D'Amico at the Accademia Nazionale di Arte Drammatica.

== Career ==
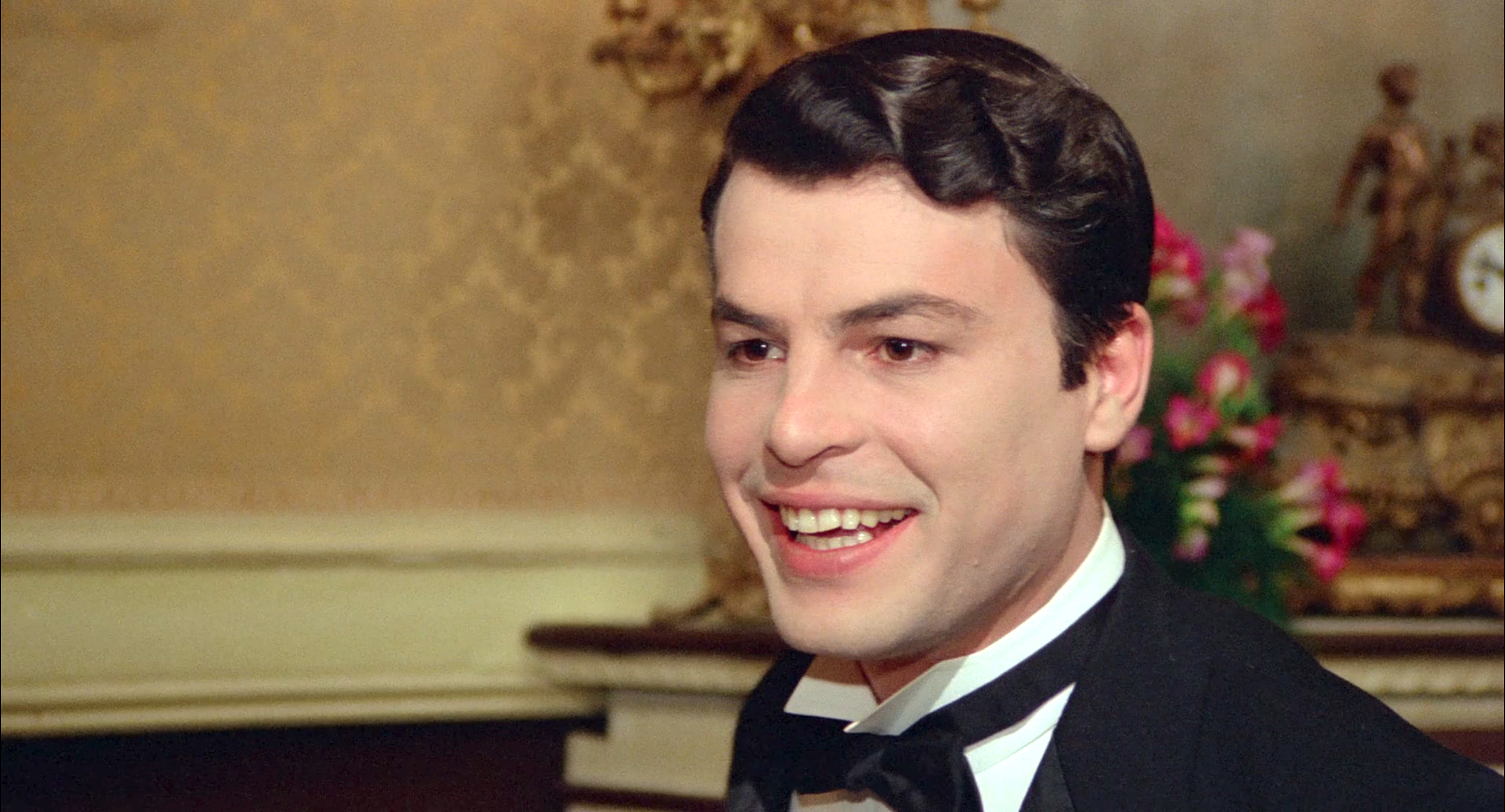
Placido in 1975's The Divine Nymph

Placido made his debut as an actor in the play Midsummer Night's Dream in 1969. Two years later he started film work under directors such as Luigi Comencini, Mario Monicelli, Salvatore Samperi, Damiano Damiani, Pasquale Squitieri, Francesco Rosi, Walerian Borowczyk, Marco Bellocchio, Paolo Cavara and Carlo Lizzani. His first success came with the role of soldier Paolo Passeri in Marcia trionfale (1976, directed by Bellocchio), for which he won a David di Donatello. Two years later he won the Silver Bear for Best Actor award at the 29th Berlin International Film Festival for his role of the homosexual worker in ironical melodrama Ernesto (1978, by Samperi).

He appeared in several TV movies in the 1970s, but 1983 marked the beginning of his greatest television popularity when he played the lead as a police inspector investigating the Mafia in Damiano Damiani's TV series La piovra. He went on to play the same part in the subsequent three seasons, until his character's assassination. Afterwards he would appear as a law enforcement official in a number of other films and TV productions dealing with organized crime, including a semi-biographical movie about Giovanni Falcone, where he acted as the titular judge. In 2008, in a reversal of roles, he portrayed longtime Mafia boss Bernardo Provenzano in the TV movie L'ultimo padrino. A recognizable role to US audiences is that of an Italian businessman in the 1988 comedy Big Business.

== Personal life ==
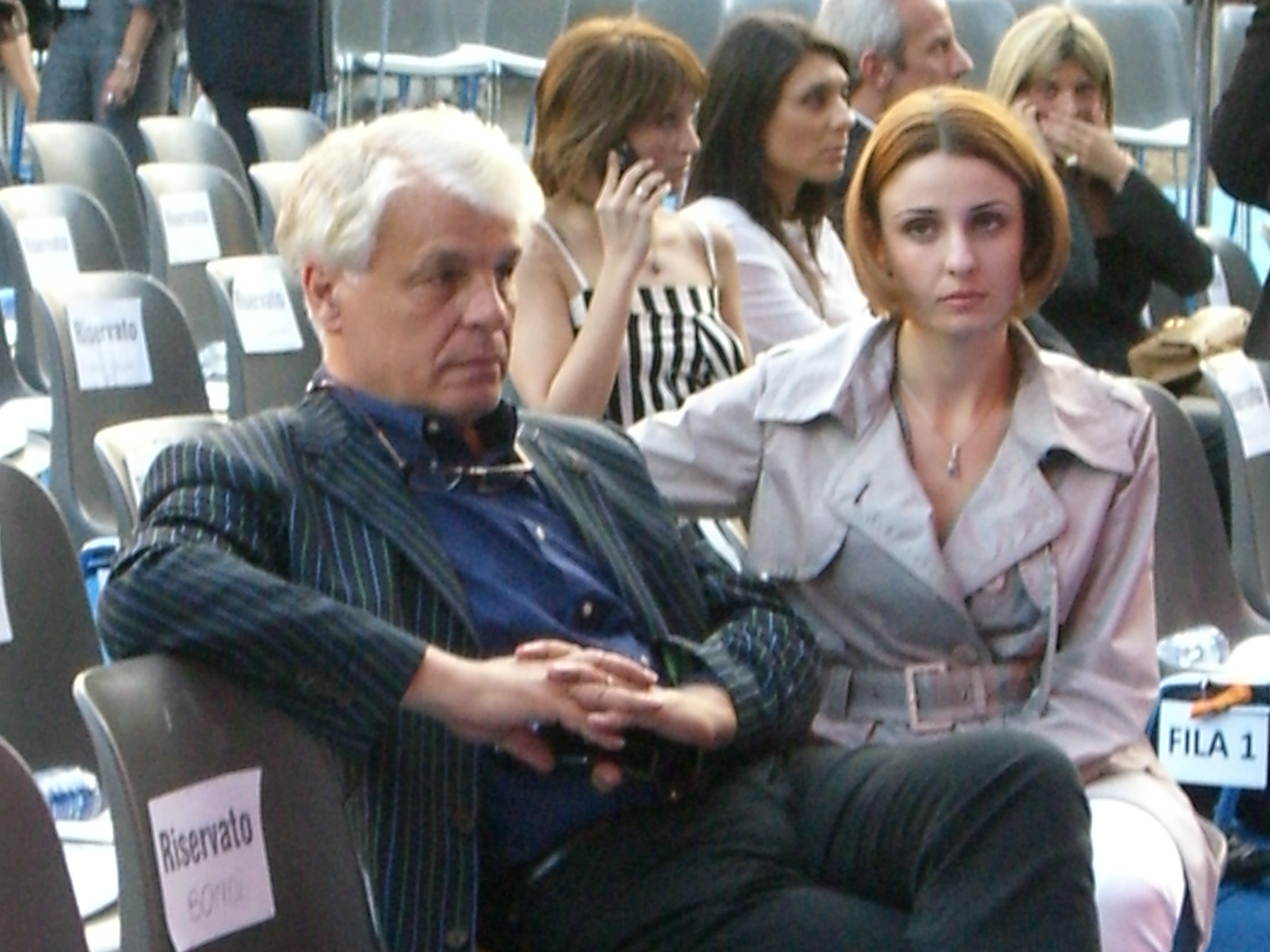
Placido and his second wife Federica Vincenti, 2008

Placido was married to actress Simonetta Stefanelli until their divorce 1994. Their daughter Violante Placido is also an actress.

In 2012, he married actress Federica Vincenti; they divorced in December 2017.

He supported the candidacy for mayor of Rome of the Italian entrepreneur Alfio Marchini in the 2016 Italian local elections.

== Filmography ==
=== Film ===
Year	Title	Role(s)	Notes
1972	Il caso Pisciotta	Amerigo LoJacono	Feature film debut
1973	The Black Hand	Antonio Turris	
1973	Teresa the Thief	Tonino Santità	
1974	Till Marriage Do Us Part	Silvio Pennacchini	
1974	Come Home and Meet My Wife	Giovanni	
1974	Scandal in the Family	Milo	
1975	The Divine Nymph	Martino Ghiondelli	
1976	Prisoner of Passion	Michele	
1976	Victory March	Paolo Passeri	
1976	And Agnes Chose to Die	Tom	
1976	Plot of Fear	Inspector Gaspare Lomenzo	
1977	Oedipus Orca	Michele	
1977	Kleinhoff Hotel	Pedro	
1977	Beach House	Vincenzino	
1978	The Pyjama Girl Case	Antonio Attolini	
1978	Io sono Mia	Giacinto	
1978	Father of the Godfathers	Michele Labruzzo	
1979	Ernesto	The Porter	
1979	Tigers in Lipstick	Angelo	Segment: "La vedova"
1979	A Man on His Knees	Salvatore Platamona	
1979	The Meadow	Enzo	
1979	Saturday, Sunday and Friday	Mario Salvetti	Segment: "Sunday"
1980	A Leap in the Dark	Giovanni Sciabola	
1980	Lulù	Schwarz	
1980	Fontamara	Berardo Viola	
1981	Three Brothers	Nicola Giuranna	
1981	The Wings of the Dove	Sandro	
1982	Sciopèn	Francesco Vitale	
1983	L'art d'aimer	Macarius	
1984	Les amants terribles	Sergio	
1985	Pizza Connection	Mario Vialone	
1986	Summer Night	Beppe Catania	
1986	Grandi magazzini	Mall's Owner	
1987	Private Affairs	Lionello Martini	
1988	Come sono buoni i bianchi	Michele	
1988	Big Business	Fabio Alberici	
1988	Via Paradiso	Francesco	
1989	Forever Mary	Marco Terzi	
1990	Afghan Breakdown	Major Mikhail Bandura	
1992	Close Friends	Simona's father	Also writer and director
1993	Quattro bravi ragazzi	Marcione	
1993	Giovanni Falcone	Giovanni Falcone	
1994	Father and Son	Corrado	
1994	Lamerica	Fiore	
1995	Policemen	Sante Carella	
1995	Un eroe borghese	Silvio Novembre	Also director
1996	La lupa	Malerba	
1998	Le Plaisir (et ses petits tracas)	Carlo	
1998	Of Lost Love	Father Gerardo	Also writer and director
1999	Dirty Linen	Furio Cimin	
1999	The Nanny	Belli	
1999	A Respectable Man	Enzo Tortora	
1999	Terra bruciata	Fra' Salvatore	
2000	Free the Fish	Michele Verrio	
2001	Once Upon a Time in Sicily	Uzeda	
2003	The Soul's Place	Salvatore	
2003	Caterina in the Big City	Himself	Cameo appearance
2004	Love Returns	Dr. Bianco	
2004	The Scent of Blood	Carlo	
2005	Romanzo Criminale	Freddo's father	Also writer and director
2006	The Goodbye Kiss	Ferruccio Anedda	
2006	The Caiman	Marco Pulici / Silvio Berlusconi	
2006	The Unknown Woman	Muffa	
2006	The Roses of the Desert	Brother Simeone	
2006	Commediasexi	Salvatore Lisass	
2007	SoloMetro	Enrico Alvari	Also producer
2007	Piano, solo	Giovanni	
2007	2061: An Exceptional Year	Cardinal Bonifacio Colonna	
2008	Blood of the Losers	Franco Dogliani	
2009	Baarìa	Communist	Cameo appearance
2009	Oggi sposi	Sabino Impanato	
2010	Parents and Children: Shake Well Before Using	Alberto	
2011	The Ages of Love	Augusto	
2011	Amici miei – Come tutto ebbe inizio	Duccio	
2012	Tulpa	Roccaforte	
2012	The Lookout	Giovanni Cali	Also director
2012	Viva l'Italia	Michele Spagnolo	
2012	The Mongrel	Attorney Silvestri	
2015	The Choice	Emilio Nicotri	Also writer and director
2015	Io che amo solo te	Father Mimì	
2016	Un'avventura romantica	Vittorio De Sica	
2016	7 Minutes	Michele Varazzi	Also writer and director
2016	La cena di Natale	Father Mimì	
2020	I Hate Summer	Marshal	
2020	Calibro 9	Rocco	
2021	Un marziano di nome Ennio	Vittorio De Sica	
2021	Appunti di un venditore di donne	Amedeo Sangiorgi	
2022	Corro da te	Gianni's father	
2022	Burning Hearts	Vincenzo Montanari	
2022	Caravaggio's Shadow	Francesco Maria del Monte	Also writer and director
2024	Eternal Visionary	Saul Colin	Also writer and director

=== Television ===
Year	Title	Role(s)	Notes
1971	K2 + 1	Delivery Boy	Episode: "10° marito"
1972	Joe Petrosino	Carlo Costantino	3 episodes
1974	Moses the Lawgiver	Caleb	Main role
1975	Orlando Furioso	Agramante	Main role
1978	Yerma	Victor	Television film
1978	Volontari per destinazione ignota	Paolo Stella	Television film
1984–1989	La piovra	Inspector Corrado Cattani	Lead role (season 1–4)
1985	Il passo falso	Gabriele	Television film
1992	Scoop	Marco Bonelli	Lead role
1993	Un uomo di rispetto	Nino	Television film
1997	Racket	Guido Gerosa	Television film
1998	La missione	Father Ramboni	Television film
2000	Padre Pio: Between Heaven and Earth	Padre Pio	Two-parts television film
2002	Il sequestro Soffiantini	Giuseppe Soffiantini	Two-parts television film
2003	Soraya	Enrico Mattei	Two-parts television film
2005	Il Grande Torino	Older Angelo	Television film
2006	Karol: The Pope, The Man	Dr. Renato Buzzonetti	Two-parts television film
2008	L'altro padrino	Bernardo Provenzano	Two-parts television film
2008	Aldo Moro: Il presidente	Aldo Moro	Television film
2013	Volare - La grande storia di Domenico Modugno	Vittorio De Sica	Two-parts television film
2013	Trilussa - Storia d'amore e di poesia	Trilussa	Television film
2015–2016	In Treatment	Guido	Recurring role; 7 episodes
2022	Noi	Himself	Episode: "La luna"

=== Other credits ===
Year	Title	Role(s)	Notes
1990	Pummarò	Director; writer	Directing debut
1991	The Conviction	Producer	
1992	Close Friends	Director; writer; actor	
1995	Un eroe borghese	Director; actor	
1998	Of Lost Love	Director; writer; actor	
2002	A Journey Called Love	Director; writer	
2004	Ovunque sei	Director; writer	
2005	Romanzo Criminale	Director; actor	
2007	SoloMetro	Producer; actor	
2007	L'uomo giusto	Producer	
2009	The Big Dream	Director; writer	
2010	Angel of Evil	Director; writer	
2010	Vampyre Compendium	Producer	Short film
2012	The Lookout	Director; actor	
2015	The Choice	Director; writer; actor	
2016	Calypso	Producer	
2016	7 Minutes	Director; writer; actor	
2017	Suburra: Blood on Rome	Director	TV series (episodes: "21 giorni" and "Patrizi e plebei")
2021	Isolation	Director	Documentary
2022	Caravaggio's Shadow	Director; writer; actor	
2022	Presto sarà domani	Director	Short film
2024	Eternal Visionary	Director; writer; actor	
