= Barbara Livi =

Italian actress

- Born: 5 May 1973 (age 53); Rome, Italy
- Occupations: Actress; fashion model
- Years active: 1991–present

Barbara Livi (born 5 May 1973) is an Italian cinema, television and theatre actress. She is best known for her role of Martina Morante in the 5th sequel of the long-running drama series Incantesimo, which was televised on Rai 1.

== Early life ==
Livi was born in Rome, Italy, on 5 May 1973.

== Career ==
In 1997, she appeared in the film Stressati directed by Mauro Cappelloni.

Her most notable performance was in the role of Martina Morante in 2002 in the fifth season of the television drama Incantesimo, which first aired in 1997, and as of 2008 was still running. She also acted in the series Un medico in famiglia, in which she played the part of Eloisa Gherarducci. In spring 2009, she had a role in the television film L'uomo che cavalcava nel buio, which starred Terence Hill. In winter 2009, she had a role in Un caso di coscienza 4. in autumn 2010, she performed in Paura di amare, a Rai 1 television miniseries. The following year, she had a role in another Rai 1 television miniseries La donna che ritorna.

Livi also features in many commercials and has worked as a fashion model for designer Lorenzo Riva.
