= Gabriele Mainetti =

Italian film director

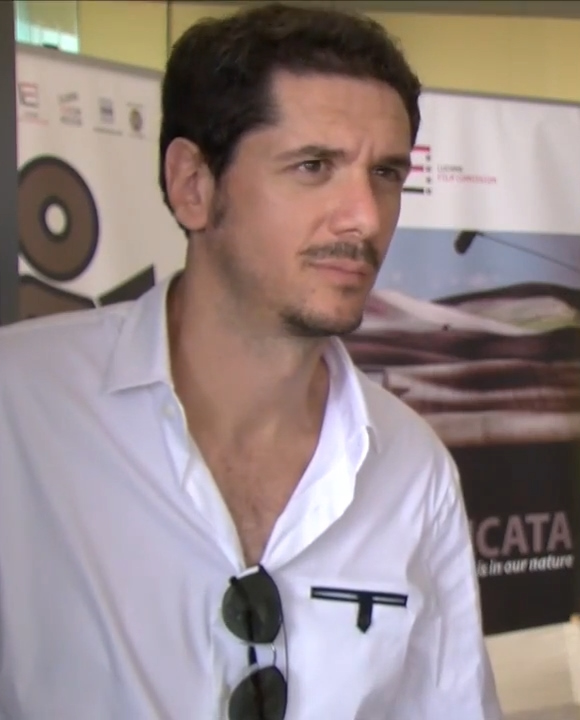
- Gabriele Mainetti in September 2017
- Born: 7 November 1976 (age 50); Rome, Italy
- Occupations: Film director, actor, screenwriter, composer, producer
- Height: 1.88 m (6 ft 2 in)

Gabriele Mainetti (born 7 November 1976) is an Italian film director, actor, screenwriter, composer and producer.

== Career ==
Mainetti started his career in the film industry as an actor for minor comedies and television series; as a director, he received attention thanks to his early short film Basette (2008), a tribute to anime series Lupin the Third. In 2012, he directed Tiger Boy, a teen drama short film about pedophilia that was awarded with a Silver Ribbon.

His debut feature film, They Call Me Jeeg (2015), was praised by audience and critic, gaining several major Italian prizes. Mainetti won the awards for Best New Director and Best Producer at the 2016 David di Donatello.

His second feature Freaks Out was scheduled to be released on 16 December 2020, but it was delayed to 28 October 2021 due to the COVID-19 pandemic in Italy.

== Filmography ==
=== Film ===
Short film

Year	Title	Director	Producer	Composer
2004	Il produttore	Yes	Yes	Yes
2005	Ultima spiaggia	Yes	No	No
2008	Basette	Yes	Yes	Yes
2010	Love in Central Park	Yes	No	No
2012	Tiger Boy	Yes	Yes	Yes
2016	Ningyo	Yes	Yes	Yes

Feature film

Year	Title	Director	Producer	Writer	Composer
2015	They Call Me Jeeg	Yes	Yes	No	Yes
2021	Freaks Out	Yes	Yes	No	Yes
2023	My Summer with the Shark	No	Yes	No	Yes
2023	The Best Century of My Life	No	Yes	No	No
2023	Elf Me	No	Yes	Yes	Yes
2025	The Forbidden City	Yes	No	Yes	No

Acting credits

Year	Title	Role
1999	Life Doesn't Scare Me	
1999	Il cielo in una stanza	Marco
2000	Maestrale	Paolo Giangrande
2001	Un altr'anno e poi cresco	Sandro
2002	Ultimo stadio	Claudio
2003	Adored: Diary of a Porn Star	Pietro at 23

=== Television ===
Acting credits

Year	Title	Role	Notes
2000	Un medico in famiglia	Adriano Mosca	5 episodes
2002	Stiamo bene insieme	Beniamino	Main cast
2004	La omicidi	Sebastiano Strada	Main cast
2006	Crimini	Marco	Episode: "Rapidamente"
2009–2011	La nuova squadra	Lele Savarese	Main cast
2010	Crimini	CC Officer	Episode: "Niente di personale"
2010	Tutti per Bruno	Luca Corsari	Main cast

== Awards and nominations ==
Year	Association	Category	Recipient	Result
2012	Brest Short Film Festival	Grand Prix	Tiger Boy	Won
2012	David di Donatello	Best Short Film	Tiger Boy	Nominated
2012	Giffoni Film Festival	Short Film Award	Tiger Boy	Nominated
2012	Italian Golden Globes	Best Short Film	Tiger Boy	Nominated
2013	Flickerfest	Best International Short Film	Tiger Boy	Won
2013	Lecce Film Festival	Emidio Greco Award	Tiger Boy	Won
2013	Nastro d'Argento	Best Short Film	Tiger Boy	Won
2016	David di Donatello	Best New Director	They Call Me Jeeg	Won
2016	David di Donatello	Best Producer	They Call Me Jeeg	Won
2016	David di Donatello	Best Score	They Call Me Jeeg	Nominated
2016	Fantasia Film Festival	Audience Award	They Call Me Jeeg	Nominated
2016	Nastro d'Argento	Best New Director	They Call Me Jeeg	Won
2016	Nastro d'Argento	Best Producer	They Call Me Jeeg	Nominated
2016	Nastro d'Argento	Best Score	They Call Me Jeeg	Nominated
2022	David di Donatello	Best Producer	Freaks Out	Won
2022	David di Donatello	Best Film	Freaks Out	Nominated
2022	David di Donatello	Best Director	Freaks Out	Nominated
2022	David di Donatello	Best Original Screenplay	Freaks Out	Nominated
2022	David di Donatello	Best Score	Freaks Out	Nominated
2022	Nastro d'Argento	Best Director	Freaks Out	Nominated
2022	Nastro d'Argento	Best Score	Freaks Out	Nominated
2022	Venice Film Festival	Golden Lion	Freaks Out	Nominated
