= Fellini's Casanova =

1976 film by Federico Fellini

- Theatrical release poster
- Italian: Il Casanova di Federico Fellini
- Directed by: Federico Fellini
- Screenplay by: Federico Fellini; Bernardino Zapponi
- Based on: Histoire de ma vie by Giacomo Casanova
- Produced by: Alberto Grimaldi
- Starring: Donald Sutherland
- Cinematography: Giuseppe Rotunno
- Edited by: Ruggero Mastroianni
- Music by: Nino Rota
- Production company: PEA
- Distributed by: Titanus
- Release date: 7 December 1976 (Italy)
- Running time: 155 minutes
- Country: Italy
- Languages: English; Italian; Venetian

Fellini's Casanova (Italian: Il Casanova di Federico Fellini, lit. 'The Casanova by Federico Fellini') is a 1976 Italian film directed by Federico Fellini from a screenplay he co-wrote with Bernardino Zapponi, adapted from the autobiography of 18th-century Venetian adventurer and writer Giacomo Casanova, played by Donald Sutherland. The film depicts Casanova's life as a journey into sexual abandonment, and his relationship with the "love of his life" Henriette (played by Tina Aumont). The narrative presents Casanova's adventures in a detached, methodical fashion, as the respect for which he yearns is constantly undermined by his more basic urges.

Shot entirely at the Cinecittà studios in Rome, the film won an Academy Award for Best Costume Design, with the Oscar going to Danilo Donati. Fellini and his co-writer Bernardino Zapponi were nominated for a Best Adapted Screenplay Oscar. The film also won BAFTA Awards for Best Costume Design and Best Production Design, and a David di Donatello for Best Score.

== Plot ==
Casanova visits one of Venice's islands to copulate with a fake nun for the pleasure of a rich voyeur. Casanova is frustrated that the man finds no interest in his research into alchemy and his further scheming. As he rows back to the mainland, Casanova is arrested, judged and imprisoned by the High Court over his famed debauchery.

During his time in prison, Casanova reminisces of his affairs with a dressmaker and later on with one of her junior employees, Anna Maria, who suffers from frequent fainting and requires constant bloodletting. Casanova escapes the prison through the roof and exiles himself from Venice, being taken into the Paris court of Madame d'Urfé. The Madame, an aged woman, enthralled by Casanova's apparent knowledge of alchemy, wishes to transform her soul into a man's through ritualistic intercourse with him. Fortuitously, Casanova encounters his brother, whose girlfriend he entices away.

Two years later, in Forlì, Casanova moves to the court of a hunchback, Du Bois, in between taking charge of a beautiful young woman, Henriette. The lovers vow fidelity to each other, but the following morning, Henriette has disappeared. Du Bois informs Casanova that an emissary of a faraway court has reclaimed Henriette, and she has requested that Casanova not attempt to follow her.

While in London, Casanova is robbed by two women and he attempts suicide by drowning himself in the Thames. A vision of a giantess and two dwarves distracts him; he follows them to a frost fair, where he arm-wrestles the giantess—a princess—and later pays to watch her bathe with the dwarves.

Casanova attends a deranged party at Lord Talou's palace in Rome, where he wins a bet over how many orgasms he can have in one hour. In Bern, he falls in love with an alchemist's daughter, Isabella, who fails to keep an appointment to go to Dresden with him; Casanova instead partakes in an orgy within the hostel he has been stranded in. In Dresden, he has a brief chance encounter with his estranged mother in a theater. He then moves to a court in Württemberg, where his desire to be taken seriously as a writer/inventor is frustrated by the court's orgiastic, wild nature. It is here that he meets Rosalba, a mechanical doll with whom he shares a dance and later on has sex with.

Time goes by and Casanova, now elderly, holds the position of librarian to Count Waldstein at his castle in Dux. Life at the castle is more than frustrating for Casanova, as he becomes an object of mockery and animosity. A weary, bloodshot Casanova cringes in an armchair and recounts a recent dream. In this dream, Casanova is back in Venice. He chases the ghosts of his past lovers, all of whom disappear. An ornate stagecoach beckons him to join its passengers. He finally meets with Rosalba, the mechanical doll, once again and they dance with each other.

== Cast ==
- Donald Sutherland as Giacomo Casanova
- Tina Aumont as Henriette
- Cicely Browne as Madame d'Urfé
- Carmen Scarpitta as Madame Charpillon
- Clara Algranti as Marcolina
- Daniela Gatti as Giselda
- Margareth Clementi as Sister Maddalena
- Olimpia Carlisi as Isabella's sister
- Silvana Fusacchia as Isabella
- Adele Angela Lojodice as Rosalba, the mechanical doll
- Sandra Elaine Allen as Angelina the Giantess
- Clarissa Mary Roll as Anna Maria
- Daniel Emilfork Berenstein as the Marquis Du Bois
- Dudley Sutton as the Duke of Württemberg
- John Karlsen as Lord Talou
- Reggie Nalder as Faulkircher
- Mario Cencelli as Dr. Mobius (uncredited)
- Harold Innocent as the Count of St. Germain (uncredited)
- Marika Rivera as Astrodi (uncredited)
- Alessandra Belloni as princess (uncredited)
- Diane Kurys as Madame Charpillon's daughter (uncredited)
- Dan van Husen as Viderol (uncredited)
- Mary Marquet as Zanetta Farussi, Casanova's mother (uncredited)
- Nicholas Smith as Francesco Giuseppe Casanova, Casanova's brother (uncredited)

== Production ==
Fellini's Casanova is noted for its symbolic, highly stylised mise en scène and the casting of Donald Sutherland in the lead role. Fellini's dislike of the character was well documented, and in one interview he even referred to exposing "the void" of Casanova's life. Producer Dino De Laurentiis suggested Robert Redford in the role of Casanova, but Fellini refused to cast him. Jack Nicholson, Marcello Mastroianni, Alberto Sordi and Gian Maria Volonté were also considered for the role. When De Laurentiis bowed out of the project and Fellini signed a new contract with producer Alberto Grimaldi, Sutherland was cast in the role. Fellini required that he shave his head and wear both prosthetic nose and chin to give him a more grotesque appearance.

The film was shot in both English and Italian, marking Fellini's first English-language film. Fellini had to re-shoot parts of the film, including the elaborate Venice carnival scene, when approximately seventy reels of film—including the first three weeks of shooting—were stolen at the Technicolor labs of Tiburtino, Rome, on 27 August 1975. The thieves were apparently interested in Pier Paolo Pasolini's Salò, or the 120 Days of Sodom (1975), and some reels of this film were also stolen, along with half of Damiano Damiani's spaghetti western A Genius, Two Partners and a Dupe (1975).

Chesty Morgan and Barbara Steele were both cast in the film, but their scenes were deleted from the final cut.

Music was composed by Nino Rota, a frequent Fellini collaborator.

== Accolades ==
| Award | Year | Category | Recipient(s) | Result | Ref. |
|---|---|---|---|---|---|
| Academy Awards | 1977 | Best Screenplay Based on Material from Another Medium | Federico Fellini and Bernardino Zapponi | Nominated | |
| Academy Awards | 1977 | Best Costume Design | Danilo Donati | Won | |
| David di Donatello | 1977 | Best Score | Nino Rota | Won | |
| British Academy Film Awards | 1978 | Best Cinematography | Giuseppe Rotunno | Nominated | |
| British Academy Film Awards | 1978 | Best Costume Design | Danilo Donati | Won | |
| British Academy Film Awards | 1978 | Best Production Design | Danilo Donati | Won | |

== See also ==
- Carnival of Venice
- Cinema of Italy
- Histoire de ma vie, Casanova's autobiography
