= Nicolas Pierre Camus de Pontcarré =

Artist

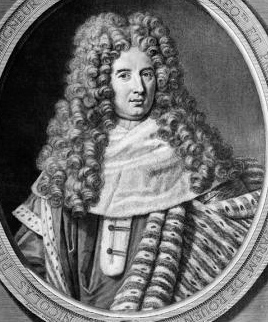
- Portrait of president Poncarré by Hyacinthe Rigaud
- Born: 1667
- Died: 10 December 1734 (aged 66–67); Paris, Kingdom of France
- Occupation: President of the Normandy parliament
- Years active: 1703-1730
- Children: Jeanne Camus de Pontcarré

Nicolas Pierre Camus of Pontcarré (1667 - 10 December 1734), was an Advisor to the Parlement of Paris (1688), Advisor to the King (1703), Master of Appeals (1691), first president of the Normandy parliament (1703 - 1730), and the son of Nicolas Camus (1625 - 1715), Lord of Grange Dumidiou and Pontcarré, advisor to the king in his yard Parliament (1679), and Marguerite Hélène Durand, daughter of a councillor of the Parlement of Paris.

As the first president of the parliament of Normandy, he dedicated himself to prevent famine, maintained order in the midst of the most critical circumstances, and risked his life to save the steward of Courson, wanted by the people for his dishonourable economic practices.

His daughter, Jeanne Camus de Pontcarré (1705-1775), became the famous Madame d'Urfé because of her ties with the Count of St. Germain, the Count of Cagliostro, and Casanova.

His portrait was painted by Hyacinthe Rigaud in 1705 for 150 pounds.
