= Giovanni Battista Casanova =

Italian painter and printmaker (1730–1795)

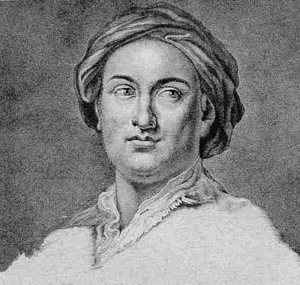
Giovanni Battista Casanova. Engraving by Christian Friedrich Boetius based on a painting by Anton Raphael Mengs

Giovanni Battista Casanova (Italian pronunciation: [dʒoˈvanni batˈtista kazaˈnɔːva; - kasa-]; 2 November 1730 – 8 December 1795) was an Italian painter and printmaker of the Neoclassic period.

He was a brother of Giacomo Casanova and Francesco Giuseppe Casanova and was born in Venice. He studied painting under Israel Silvestre and Dietrich at Dresden, and went in 1752 to Rome, where, under the tuition of Anton Raphael Mengs, he became an accomplished artist in pencil and crayon. Among other works he designed the plates to Winckelmann's Monumenti antichi. He was appointed professor in the Academy at Dresden in 1764.

== Early life ==
The third son of Gaetano Casanova and Zanetta Farussi, Venetian actors, he was the brother of the more famous Giacomo Casanova and the painter Francesco Casanova. Orphaned by his father in 1733, in 1737 he followed his mother to Dresden where he frequented the workshops of Louis de Silvestre and Christian Wilhelm Ernst Dietrich.

With a scholarship he returned to Venice and remained there for three years under the direction of Giovanni Battista Piazzetta. In 1752, when he was 22 years old, Anton Raphael Mengs, passing through Venice, met him and wanted him with him on his trip to Italy. They stopped in Florence, Rome, Naples, Pompeii and Herculaneum, where he had the opportunity to prove himself as a valid copyist, particularly in the works of Raphael.

Back in Rome he had the opportunity to gain appreciation as an artist, and when Mengs went to Spain in 1762, Casanova received a commission from the Sorbonne in Paris to paint the portrait of Clement XIII, and won a grand prize for painting at the Academy of Rome.

He met Winckelmann and they collaborated together on a book on the antiquities of Rome, which was later published in 1767, but differences of character and some shady business caused their breakup. He was in fact accused of fraud by Winckelmann for having sold him two drawings of archaeological pieces, passed off as authentic.

The final resting place In 1764, despite having received several offers from Naples, Rome and London, he preferred to return to Dresden, where together with Johann Eleazar Zeissig, called Schenauer, he was professor and co-director of the Dresden Academy. From 1776 he was appointed sole director of the Academy, a position he held until his death. Under his direction, many valid artists were trained and he contributed to the development of artistic taste in Germany.

Those who knew him said that he was a very authoritative person, elegant and with very refined manners, but his character was not the best because he was inclined to controversy.

As an artist he had no creative talent, he preferred to copy from life, make portraits or copy old masters, he knew how to masterfully represent mythological and allegorical scenes according to the taste of his time. His technical ability and his theoretical knowledge led him to teaching and in this role he gave the best of himself.

With his experience he developed a theory of painting that he intended to publish but he left only the French manuscript of the first volume, preserved in the library of the Dresden Academy. He also wrote a book in Italian for the use of the students of the Academy entitled: Discorsi sopra gli antichi e varj monumento loro per uso degli studenti dell'Elettoral Accademia delle Bell'Arti di Dresda by G. Casanova professor of the same . See Dyck, Leipzig 1770. In addition to the Academy, among his interests was the collection of coins, medals and prints.

Giovanni Casanova's grave is located in Dresden in the Old Catholic Cemetery Dresden ( Alter Katholischer Friedhof ), where he rests together with many other famous people. His monument was designed by his student Franz Pettrich.
