= Giacomo Casanova =

Venetian adventurer and writer (1725–1798)

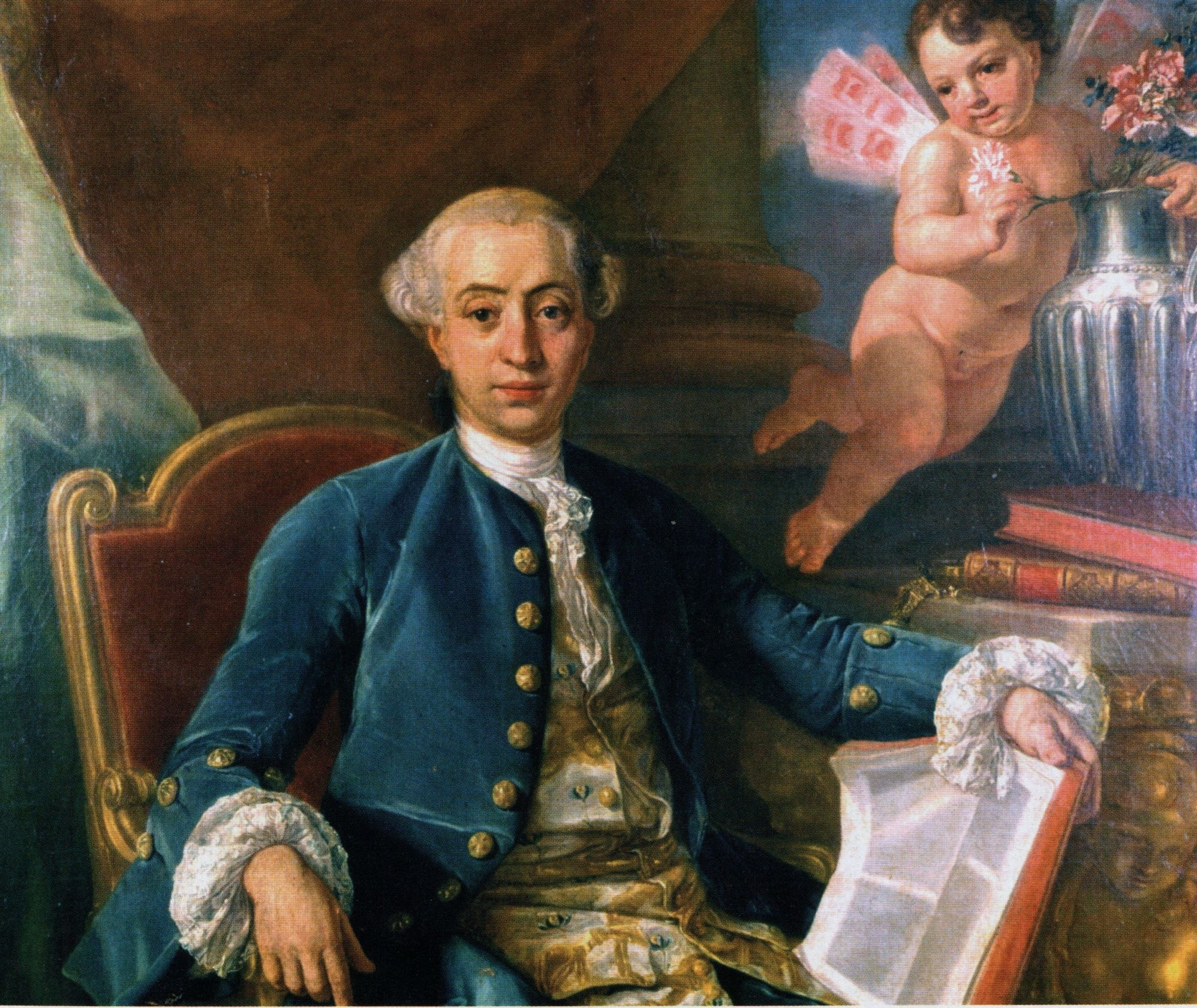
- Portrait attributed to Francesco Narici, c. 1760
- Born: 2 April 1725; Venice, Republic of Venice
- Died: 4 June 1798 (aged 73); Dux, Bohemia, Holy Roman Empire
- Education: University of Padua (laurea)
- Parents: Gaetano Giuseppe Casanova; Zanetta Farussi

Giacomo Girolamo Casanova (/ˌkæsəˈnoʊvə, ˌkæzə-/; Italian: [ˈdʒaːkomo dʒiˈrɔːlamo kazaˈnɔːva, kasa-]; 2 April 1725 – 4 June 1798) was an Italian adventurer and writer who was born in the Republic of Venice and travelled extensively throughout Europe. He is chiefly remembered for his autobiography, written in French and published posthumously as Histoire de ma vie ("The Story of My Life"). That work has come to be regarded as a unique and provocative source of information on the customs and norms of European social life in the 18th century.

Born to a family of actors, Casanova studied law at the University of Padua and received minor orders in the Catholic Church with a view towards pursuing a career as a canon lawyer. However, he had no enthusiasm for the law or vocation for the church, and he soon abandoned those plans and launched instead upon an itinerant life as a gambler, violinist, confidence trickster, and man of letters. Throughout his life, Casanova obtained money and other advantages from various aristocratic patrons by pretending to possess alchemical, cabbalistic, and magical secret knowledge. Among other exploits, Casanova escaped from the Piombi prison, to which he had been confined by order of the Venetian Council of Ten for offenses against religion and morals, and later helped convince the authorities of the Kingdom of France to establish a state lottery as a source of revenue.

Casanova, who often misrepresented himself as an aristocrat, used a variety of pseudonyms, including Baron or Count of Farussi (his mother's maiden name) and the invented title Chevalier de Seingalt (French pronunciation: [sɛ̃ɡɑl]). After he began writing in French, following his second exile from Venice, he often signed his works as "Jacques Casanova de Seingalt". (Note: He always signed his Italian works as simply "Giacomo Casanova" since nobiliary particles were never used in Venice and everybody knew he was Venetian.) In his autobiography, Casanova reports encounters with popes, cardinals, and monarchs, as well as with major intellectual and artistic figures such as Voltaire, Goethe, and Mozart.

The most notorious aspect of Casanova's career are his many complicated sexual affairs with women, stretching from his early adolescence to his old age, which he described in detail in his autobiography. As a consequence of this, Casanova's name has become a byword for a male seducer and libertine, like "Lothario" or "Don Juan". He spent his final years in Bohemia, where he served as librarian to the household of Count Waldstein and resided at Dux Castle, where he wrote his autobiography.

== Biography ==
=== Youth ===
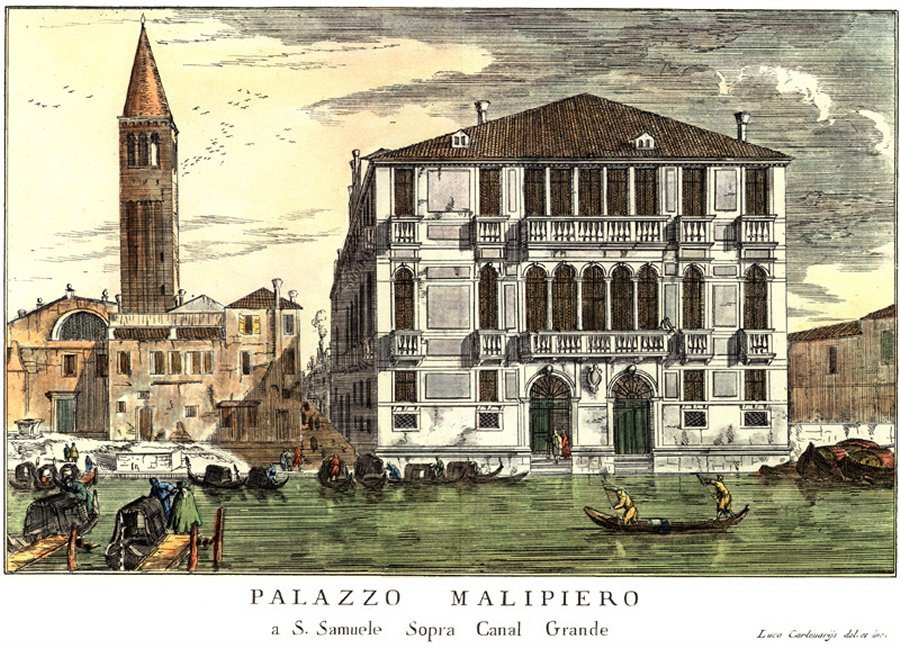
The Church of San Samuele, where Casanova was baptized, and Palazzo Malipiero c. 1716

Giacomo Girolamo Casanova was born in Venice in 1725 to actress Zanetta Farussi, wife of actor and dancer Gaetano Casanova. Giacomo was the first of six children, followed by Francesco Giuseppe (1727–1803), Giovanni Battista (1730–1795), Faustina Maddalena (1731–1736), Maria Maddalena Antonia Stella (1732–1800), and Gaetano Alvise (1734–1783).

At the time of Casanova's birth, Venice was considered the pleasure capital of Europe. It was ruled by political and religious conservatives who tolerated social vices and encouraged tourism. The city was a standard stop on the Grand Tour undertaken by young men coming of age, especially members of the British aristocracy. Its Carnival, gambling houses, and courtesans attracted many visitors. This environment provided many of his formative experiences.

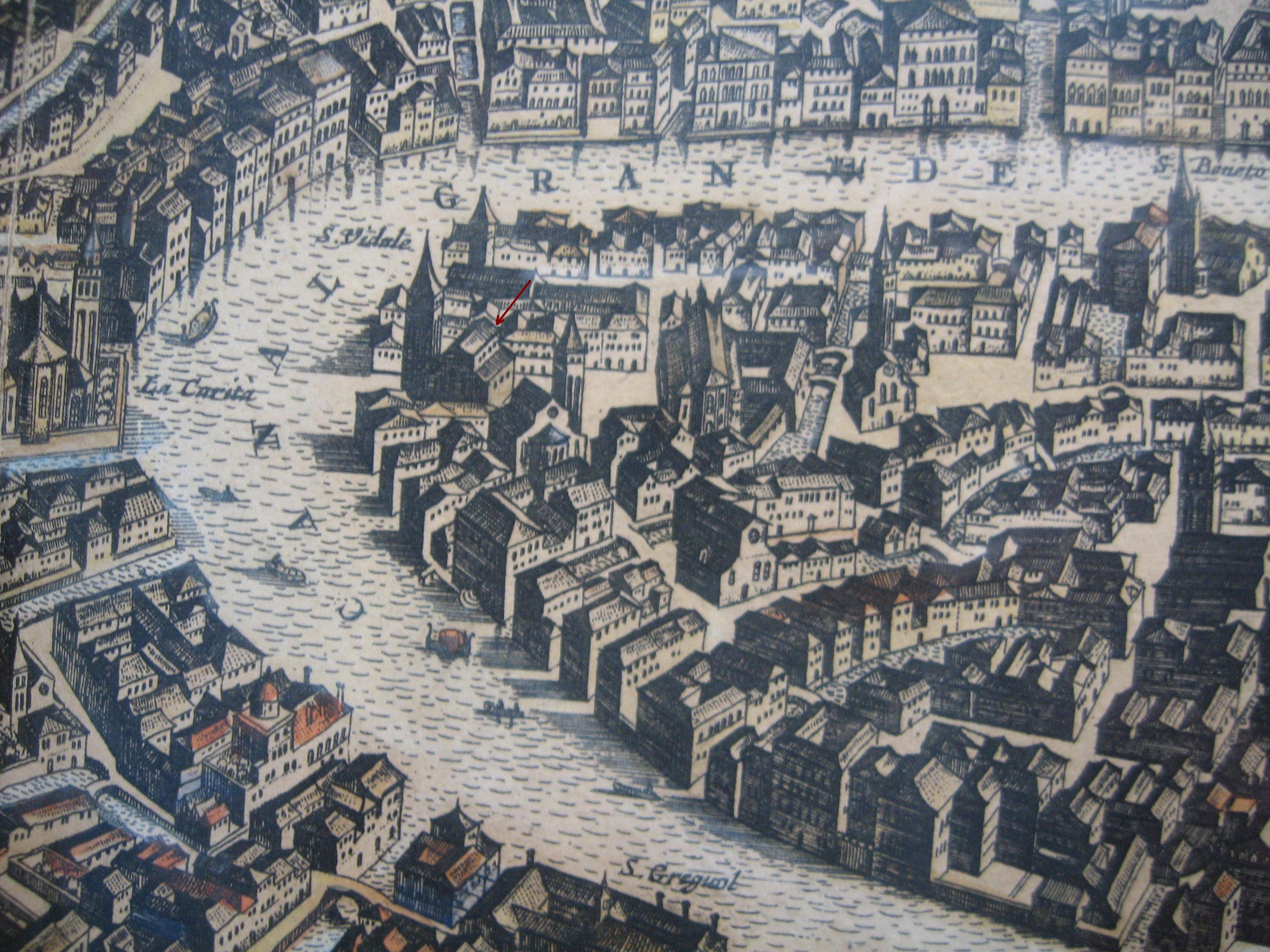
San Samuele – Casanova's childhood neighborhood

His grandmother, Marzia Baldissera, cared for him while his mother toured about Europe in the theater. His father died when he was eight. As a child, Casanova suffered nosebleeds, for which his grandmother sought help from a witch: "Leaving the gondola, we enter a hovel, where we find an old woman sitting on a pallet, with a black cat in her arms and five or six others around her." Though the unguent applied was ineffective, Casanova was fascinated by the incantation. Perhaps to remedy the nosebleeds (a physician blamed the density of Venice's air), Casanova, on his ninth birthday, was sent to a boarding house in Padua, on the mainland. For Casanova, the neglect by his parents was a bitter memory. "So they got rid of me," he proclaimed. Conditions at the boarding house were appalling, so he appealed to be placed under the care of Abbé Gozzi, his primary instructor, who tutored him in academic subjects, as well as the violin. Casanova moved in with the priest and his family and lived there through most of his teenage years. In the Gozzi household, Casanova first came into contact with the opposite sex, when Gozzi's younger sister Bettina fondled him at the age of 11. Bettina was "pretty, lighthearted, and a great reader of romances. ... The girl pleased me at once, though I had no idea why. It was she who little by little kindled in my heart the first sparks of a feeling which later became my ruling passion." Although she subsequently married, Casanova maintained a lifelong attachment to Bettina and the Gozzi family.

Casanova boasts of having demonstrated from early on a quick wit, an intense appetite for knowledge, and a perpetually inquisitive mind. He entered the University of Padua at 12 and graduated at 17, in 1742, with a laurea in law (a discipline for which he later declared his "unconquerable aversion"). His guardian's hope was that he would become an ecclesiastical lawyer. Casanova had also studied moral philosophy, chemistry, and mathematics, and was keenly interested in medicine. ("I should have been allowed to do as I wished and become a physician, in which profession quackery is even more effective than it is in legal practice.") He frequently prescribed his own treatments for himself and friends. While attending the university, Casanova began to gamble and quickly got into debt, causing his recall to Venice by his grandmother, but the gambling habit became firmly established.

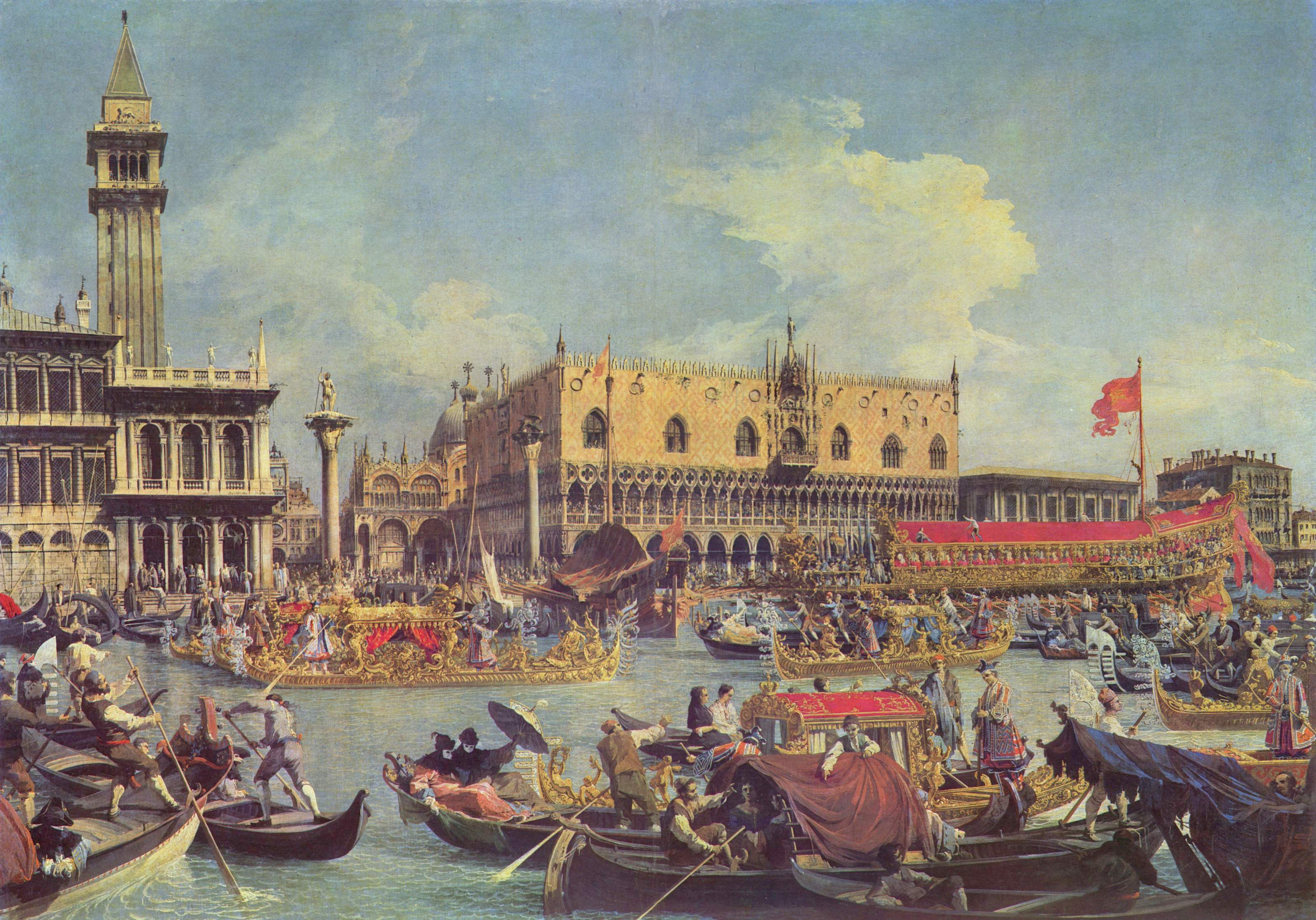
Venice in the 1730s

Back in Venice, Casanova started his clerical law career and was admitted as an abbé after being conferred minor orders by the Patriarch of Venice. He shuttled back and forth to Padua to continue his university studies. By now, he had become something of a dandy—tall and dark, his long hair powdered, scented, and elaborately curled. (Note: Casanova described his own height as "Ayant la taille de cinq pieds et neuf pouces" ("Having the height of five feet nine inches"). By pieds, Casanova refers to the French king's foot, which was in modern terms 12.8 inches (33 cm). The pouce or historic French inch was slightly larger in modern inches: 1.067 in (2.71 cm). Thus, Casanova's height can be calculated as having been around 1.868 m (6.13 ft). He was about 16 cm (6.3 in) taller than the average European man of that time.) He quickly ingratiated himself with a patron (something he was to do all his life), 76-year-old Venetian senator Alvise Gasparo Malipiero, the owner of Palazzo Malipiero, close to Casanova's home in Venice. Malipiero moved in the best circles and taught young Casanova a great deal about good food and wine, and how to behave in society. However, Casanova was caught dallying with Malipiero's intended object of seduction, the actress Teresa Imer, and the senator drove both of them from his house. Casanova's growing curiosity about women led to his first complete sexual experience, with two sisters, Nanetta and Marton Savorgnan, then 14 and 16, who were distant relatives of the Grimanis. Casanova proclaimed that his life avocation was firmly established by this encounter.

=== Early career in Italy and abroad ===
Scandals tainted Casanova's brief church career. After his grandmother's death, Casanova entered a seminary for a short while, but was thrown out after being discovered in bed with a fellow seminarian. Soon his indebtedness landed him in prison for the first time. An attempt by his mother to secure him a position with Bishop Bernardo de Bernardis was rejected by Casanova after a very brief trial of conditions in the bishop's Calabrian see. Instead, he found employment as a scribe with the powerful Cardinal Acquaviva in Rome. On meeting Pope Benedict XIV, Casanova boldly asked for a dispensation to read the "forbidden books" and from eating fish (which he claimed inflamed his eyes). He also composed love letters for another cardinal. When Casanova became the scapegoat for a scandal involving a local pair of star-crossed lovers, Cardinal Acquaviva dismissed Casanova, thanking him for his sacrifice, but effectively ending his church career.

In search of a new profession, Casanova bought a commission to become a military officer for the Republic of Venice. His first step was to look the part:

Reflecting that there was now little likelihood of my achieving fortune in my ecclesiastical career, I decided to dress as a soldier ... I inquire for a good tailor ... he brings me everything I need to impersonate a follower of Mars. I bought a long sword, and with my handsome cane in hand, a trim hat with a black cockade, with my hair cut in side whiskers and a long false pigtail, I set forth to impress the whole city.

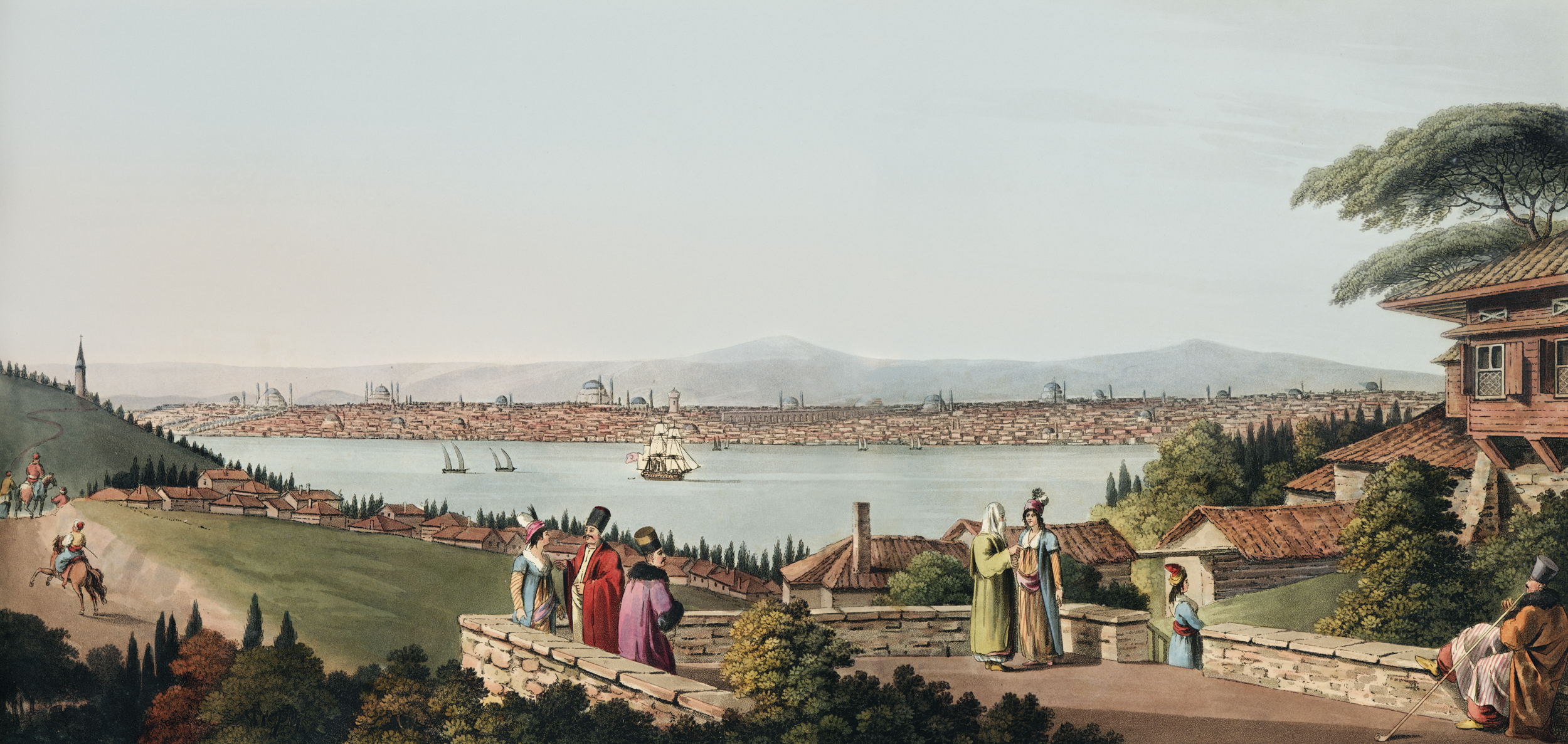
Constantinople in the 18th century

He joined a Venetian regiment at Corfu, his stay being broken by a brief trip to Constantinople, ostensibly to deliver a letter from his former master the Cardinal. Finding his advancement too slow and his duty boring, he managed to lose most of his pay playing faro. Casanova soon abandoned his military career and returned to Venice.

At the age of 21, he set out to become a professional gambler, but losing all the money remaining from the sale of his commission, he turned to his old benefactor Alvise Grimani for a job. Casanova thus began his third career, as a violinist in the San Samuele Theater, "a menial journeyman of a sublime art in which, if he who excels is admired, the mediocrity is rightly despised. ... My profession was not a noble one, but I did not care. Calling everything prejudice, I soon acquired all the habits of my degraded fellow musicians." He and some of his fellows "often spent our nights roaming through different quarters of the city, thinking up the most scandalous practical jokes and putting them into execution. We amused ourselves by untying the gondolas moored before private houses, which then drifted with the current." They also sent midwives and physicians on false calls.

Good fortune came to the rescue when Casanova, unhappy with his lot as a musician, saved the life of a Venetian patrician of the Bragadin family, who had a stroke while riding with Casanova in a gondola after a wedding ball. They immediately stopped to have the senator bled. Then, at the senator's palace, a physician bled the senator again and applied an ointment of mercury to the senator's chest. This raised his temperature and induced a massive fever, and Bragadin appeared to be choking on his own swollen windpipe. A priest was called as death seemed to be approaching. However, despite protests from the attending physician, Casanova ordered the removal of the ointment and the washing of the senator's chest with cool water. The senator recovered from his illness with rest and a sensible diet. Because of his youth and his facile recitation of medical knowledge, the senator and his two bachelor friends thought Casanova wise beyond his years, and concluded that he must be in possession of occult knowledge. As they were cabalists themselves, the senator invited Casanova into his household and became a lifelong patron.

Casanova stated in his memoirs:

I took the most creditable, the noblest, and the only natural course. I decided to put myself in a position where I need no longer go without the necessities of life; and what those necessities were for me no one could judge better than I. ... No one in Venice could understand how an intimacy could exist between myself and three men of their character, they all heaven and I all earth; they most severe in their morals, and I addicted to every kind of dissolute living.

For the next three years under the senator's patronage, working nominally as a legal assistant, Casanova led the life of a nobleman, dressing magnificently and, as was natural to him, spending most of his time gambling and engaging in amorous pursuits. His patron was exceedingly tolerant, but he warned Casanova that some day he would pay the price; "I made a joke of his dire Prophecies and went my way." However, not much later, Casanova was forced to leave Venice, due to further scandals. Casanova had dug up a freshly buried corpse to play a practical joke on an enemy and exact revenge, but the victim went into a paralysis, never to recover. In another scandal, a young girl accused him of rape and went to the officials. Casanova denied the rape, claiming that she had duped him. He was later acquitted of the crime for lack of evidence, by which time he had already fled from Venice.

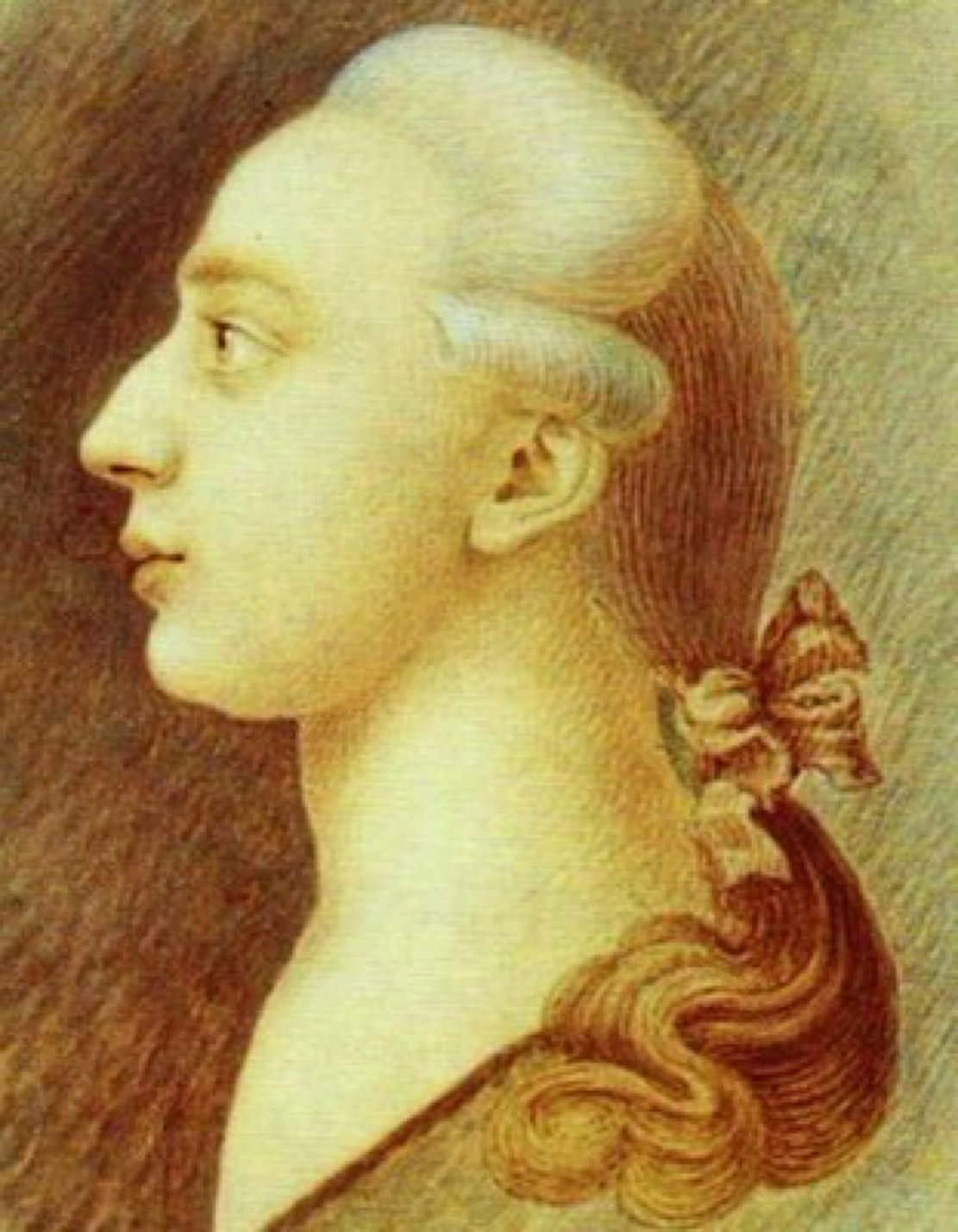
Drawing by his brother Francesco

Escaping to Parma, Casanova entered into a three-month affair with a Frenchwoman he named "Henriette", perhaps the deepest love he ever experienced—a woman who combined beauty, intelligence, and culture. In his words, "They who believe that a woman is incapable of making a man equally happy all the twenty-four hours of the day have never known an Henriette. The joy which flooded my soul was far greater when I conversed with her during the day than when I held her in my arms during the night. Having read a great deal and having natural taste, Henriette judged rightly of everything." She also judged Casanova astutely. As noted Casanovist J. Rives Childs wrote:

Perhaps no woman so captivated Casanova as Henriette; few women obtained so deep an understanding of him. She penetrated his outward shell early in their relationship, resisting the temptation to unite her destiny with his. She came to discern his volatile nature, his lack of social background, and the precariousness of his finances. Before leaving, she slipped into his pocket five hundred louis, mark of her evaluation of him.

=== Grand tour ===
Crestfallen and despondent, Casanova returned to Venice, and after a good gambling streak, he recovered and set off on a grand tour, reaching Paris in 1750. Along the way, from one town to another, he got into sexual escapades resembling operatic plots. In Lyon, he entered the society of Freemasonry, which appealed to his interest in secret rites and which, for the most part, attracted men of intellect and influence who proved useful in his life, providing valuable contacts and uncensored knowledge. Casanova was also attracted to Rosicrucianism. In Lyon, Casanova became companion and finally took the highest degree of Scottish Rite Master Mason.

Regarding his initiation to the Scottish Rite Freemasonry in Lyon, Casanova says:

A respectable personage whom I met at the house of Monsieur de Rochebaron procured me the privilege of being admitted into the company of those who see the light. I became an apprentice Freemason. Two months later at Paris I received the second degree, and some months later the third, which is the mastership;. It is the highest. All the other titles which were conferred on me in the course of time are pleasing fictions which, though symbolic, add nothing to the dignity of Master.

Casanova stayed in Paris for two years, learned the language, spent much time at the theater, and introduced himself to notables. Soon, however, his numerous liaisons were noted by the Paris police, as they were in nearly every city he visited.

In 1752, his brother Francesco and he moved from Paris to Dresden, where his mother and sister Maria Maddalena were living. His new play, La Moluccheide, now lost, was performed at the Royal Theatre, where his mother often played in lead roles. He then visited Prague, and Vienna, where the tighter moral atmosphere was not to his liking. He finally returned to Venice in 1753. There, Casanova resumed his escapades, picking up many enemies and gaining the scrutiny of the Venetian inquisitors. His police record became a lengthening list of reported blasphemies, seductions, fights, and public controversy. A state spy, Giovanni Manucci, was employed to draw out Casanova's knowledge of cabalism and Freemasonry and to examine his library for forbidden books. Senator Bragadin, in total seriousness this time (being a former inquisitor himself), advised his "son" to leave immediately or face the stiffest consequences.

=== Imprisonment and escape ===
On 26 July 1755, at age 30, Casanova was arrested for affront to religion and common decency: "The Tribunal, having taken cognizance of the grave faults committed by G. Casanova primarily in public outrages against the holy religion, their Excellencies have caused him to be arrested and imprisoned under the Leads." "The Leads" was a prison of seven cells on the top floor of the east wing of the Doge's Palace, reserved for prisoners of higher status as well as certain types of offenders—such as political prisoners, defrocked or libertine priests or monks, and usurers—and named for the lead plates covering the palace roof. The following 12 September, without a trial and without being informed of the reasons for his arrest and of the sentence, he was sentenced to five years imprisonment.

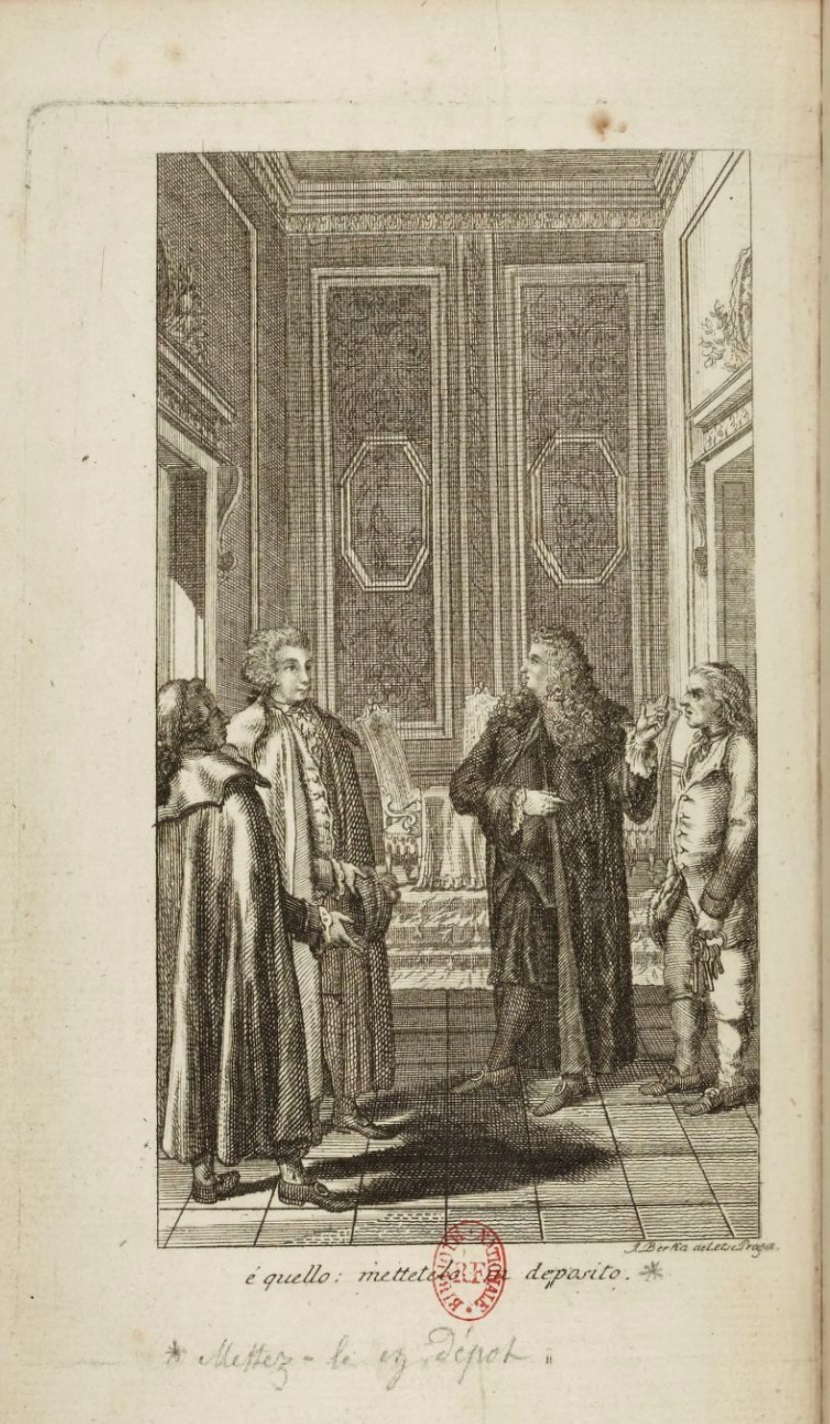
"It's him. Place him in custody!"

He was placed in a single-person room with clothing, a pallet bed, table, and armchair in "the worst of all the cells", where he suffered greatly from the darkness, summer heat, and "millions of fleas". He was later housed with a series of cellmates. After five months and a personal appeal from Count Bragadin, he was given warm winter bedding and a monthly stipend for books and better food. During exercise walks he was granted in the prison garret, he found a piece of black marble and an iron bar which he smuggled back to his cell; he hid the bar inside his armchair. When he was temporarily without cellmates, he spent two weeks sharpening the bar into a spike on the stone. Then he began to gouge through the wooden floor underneath his bed, knowing that his cell was directly above the Inquisitor's chamber. Just three days before his intended escape during a festival, when no officials would be in the chamber below, Casanova was moved to a larger, lighter cell with a view, despite his protests that he was perfectly happy where he was. In his new cell, "I sat in my armchair like a man in a stupor; motionless as a statue, I saw that I had wasted all the efforts I had made, and I could not repent of them. I felt that I had nothing to hope for, and the only relief left to me was not to think of the future."

Casanova set upon another escape plan. He solicited the help of the prisoner in the adjacent cell, Father Balbi, a renegade priest. The spike, carried to the new cell inside the armchair, was passed to the priest in a folio Bible carried under a heaping plate of pasta by the hoodwinked jailer. The priest made a hole in his ceiling, climbed across and made a hole in the ceiling of Casanova's cell. To neutralize his new cellmate, who was a spy, Casanova played on his superstitions and terrorized him into silence. When Balbi broke through to Casanova's cell, Casanova lifted himself through the ceiling, leaving behind a note that quoted the 117th Psalm (from the Latin Vulgate): "I shall not die, but live, and declare the works of the Lord".

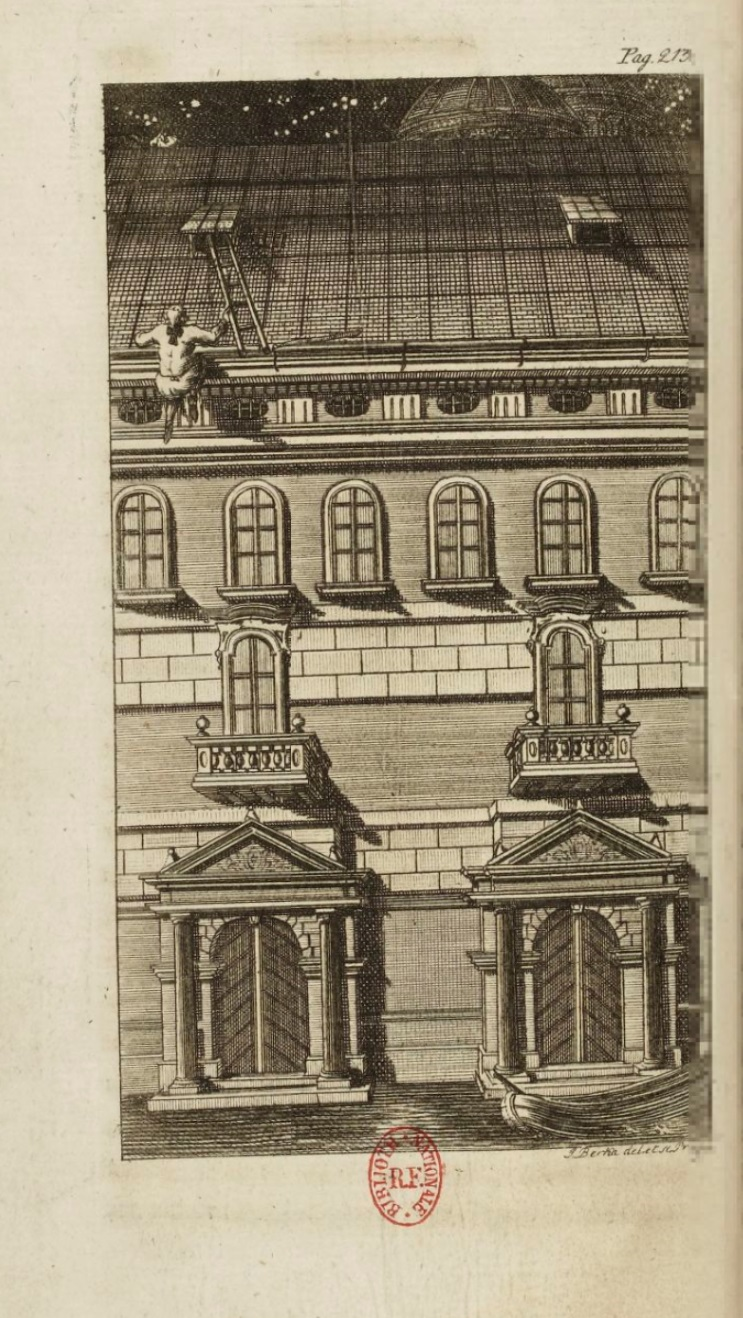
Illustration from Story of My Flight

The spy remained behind, too frightened of the consequences if he were caught escaping with the others. Casanova and Balbi pried their way through the lead plates and onto the sloping roof of the Doge's Palace, with a heavy fog swirling. The drop to the nearby canal being too great, Casanova prised open the grate over a dormer window, and broke the window to gain entry. They found a long ladder on the roof, and with the additional use of a bedsheet "rope" that Casanova had prepared, lowered themselves into the room whose floor was 25 feet (7.6 m) below. They rested until morning, changed clothes, then broke a small lock on an exit door and passed into a palace corridor, through galleries and chambers, and down stairs, where, by convincing the guard they had inadvertently been locked into the palace after an official function, they left through a final door. It was 6:00 in the morning and they escaped by gondola. Eventually, Casanova reached Paris, where he arrived on the same day (5 January 1757) that Robert-François Damiens made an attempt on the life of Louis XV. (Casanova would later witness and describe his execution.)

Thirty years later in 1787, Casanova wrote Story of My Flight, which was very popular and was reprinted in many languages, and he repeated the tale a little later in his memoirs. Casanova's judgment of the exploit is characteristic:

Thus did God provide me with what I needed for an escape which was to be a wonder if not a miracle. I admit that I am proud of it; but my pride does not come from my having succeeded, for luck had a good deal to do with that; it comes from my having concluded that the thing could be done and having had the courage to undertake it.

=== Return to Paris ===
He knew his stay in Paris might be a long one and he proceeded accordingly: "I saw that to accomplish anything I must bring all my physical and moral faculties in play, make the acquaintance of the great and the powerful, exercise strict self-control, and play the chameleon." Casanova had matured, and this time in Paris, though still depending at times on quick thinking and decisive action, he was more calculating and deliberate. His first task was to find a new patron. He reconnected with his old friend de Bernis, now the Foreign Minister of France. Casanova was advised by his patron to find a means of raising funds for the state as a way to gain instant favor. Casanova promptly became one of the trustees of the first state lottery, and one of its best ticket salesmen. The enterprise earned him a large fortune quickly. With money in hand, he traveled in high circles and undertook new seductions. He duped many socialites with his occultism, particularly the Marquise Jeanne d'Urfé, using his excellent memory which made him appear to have a sorcerer's power of numerology. In Casanova's view, "deceiving a fool is an exploit worthy of an intelligent man".

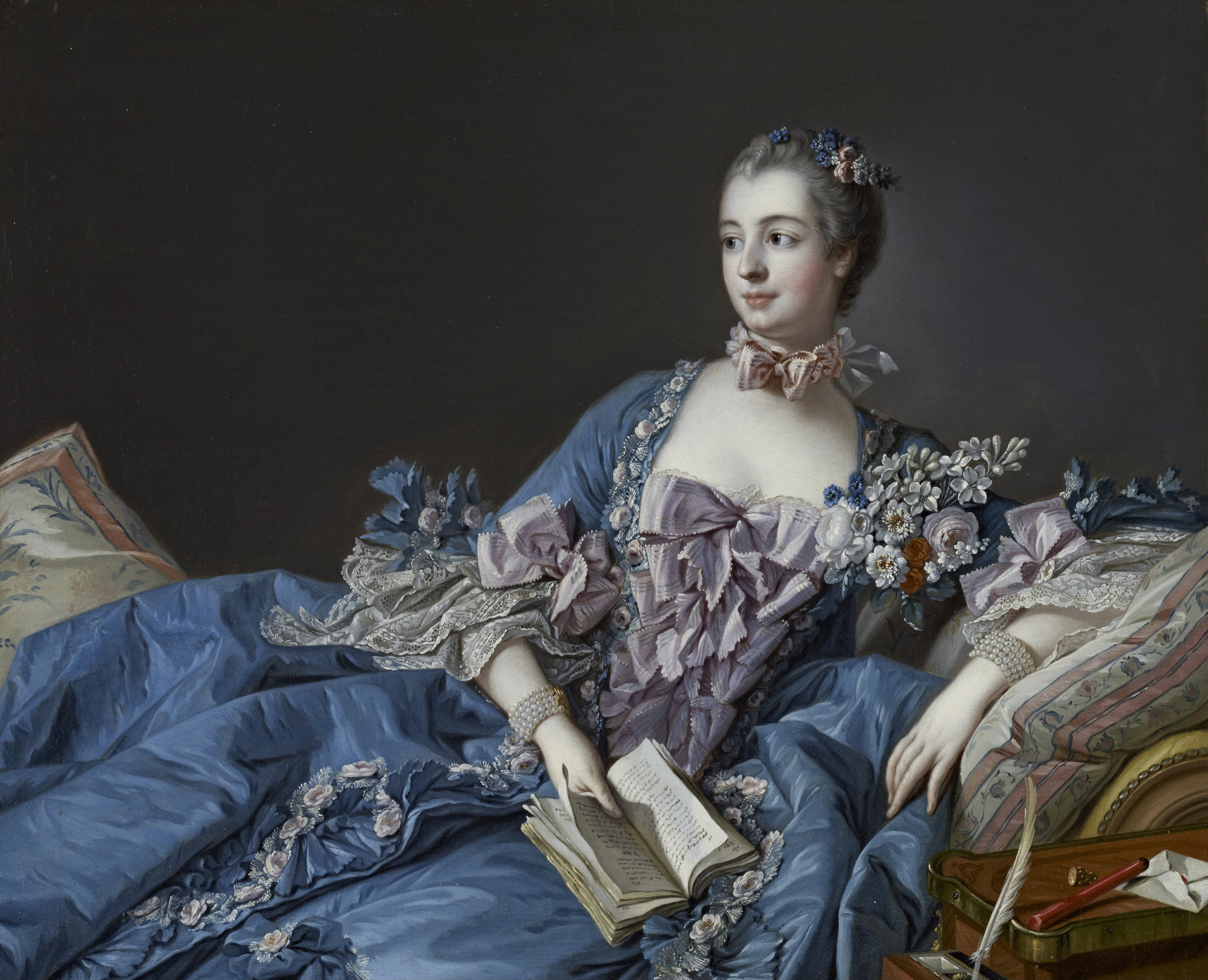
Madame de Pompadour, c. 1750

Casanova claimed to be a Rosicrucian and an alchemist, aptitudes which made him popular with some of the most prominent figures of the era, among them Madame de Pompadour, the Count of Saint-Germain, d'Alembert, and Jean-Jacques Rousseau. So popular was alchemy among the nobles, particularly the search for the "philosopher's stone", that Casanova was highly sought after for his supposed knowledge, and he profited handsomely. He met his match, however, in the Count of Saint-Germain: "This very singular man, born to be the most barefaced of all imposters, declared with impunity, with a casual air, that he was three hundred years old, that he possessed the universal medicine, that he made anything he liked from nature, that he created diamonds."

De Bernis decided to send Casanova to Dunkirk on his first spying mission. Casanova was paid well for his quick work and this experience prompted one of his few remarks against the ancien régime and the class on which he was dependent. He remarked in hindsight, "All the French ministers are the same. They lavished money which came out of the other people's pockets to enrich their creatures, and they were absolute: The down-trodden people counted for nothing, and, through this, the indebtedness of the State and the confusion of finances were the inevitable results. A Revolution was necessary."

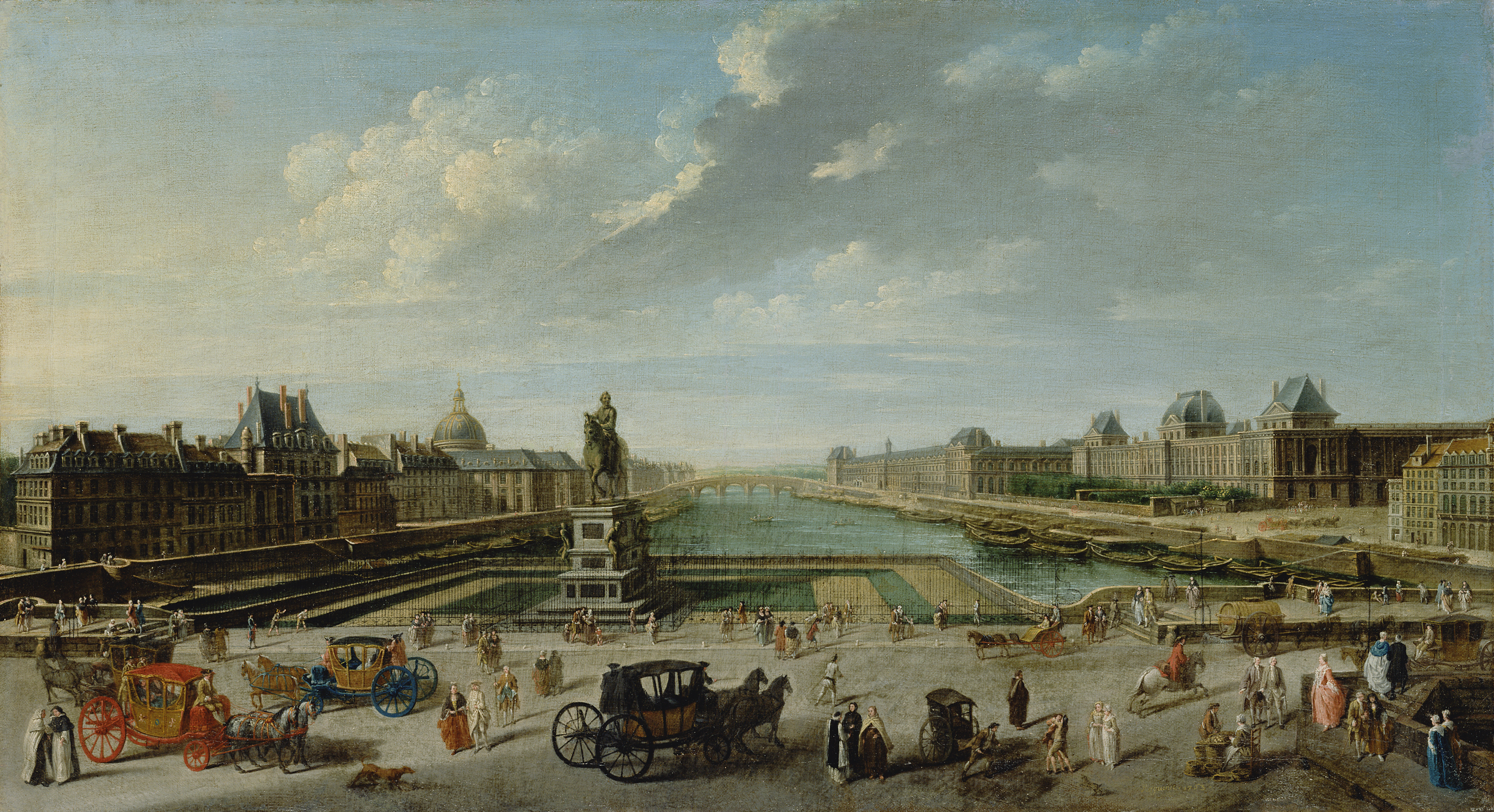
Paris in the 18th century

As the Seven Years' War began, Casanova was again called to help increase the state treasury. He was entrusted with a mission of selling state bonds in Amsterdam, the Netherlands being the financial center of Europe at the time. He succeeded in selling the bonds at only an 8% discount, and the following year was rich enough to found a silk manufactory with his earnings. The French government even offered him a title and a pension if he would become a French citizen and work on behalf of the finance ministry, but he declined, perhaps because it would frustrate his wanderlust. Casanova had reached his peak of fortune, but could not sustain it. He ran the business poorly, borrowed heavily trying to save it, and spent much of his wealth on constant liaisons with his female workers who were his "harem".

For his debts, Casanova was imprisoned again, this time at For-l'Évêque, but was liberated four days afterwards, upon the insistence of the Marquise d'Urfé. Unfortunately, though he was released, his patron de Bernis was dismissed by Louis XV at that time and Casanova's enemies closed in on him. He sold the rest of his belongings and secured another mission to Holland to distance himself from his troubles.

=== On the run ===
This time, however, his mission failed and he fled to Cologne, then Stuttgart in the spring of 1760, where he lost the rest of his fortune. He was yet again arrested for his debts, but managed to escape to Switzerland. Weary of his wanton life, Casanova visited the monastery of Einsiedeln and considered the simple, scholarly life of a monk. He returned to his hotel to think on the decision, only to encounter a new object of desire, and reverting to his old instincts, all thoughts of a monk's life were quickly forgotten. Moving on, he visited Albrecht von Haller and Voltaire, and arrived in Marseille, then Genoa, Florence, Rome, Naples, Modena, and Turin, moving from one sexual romp to another.

In 1760, Casanova started styling himself the Chevalier de Seingalt, a name he was to use increasingly for the rest of his life. On occasion, he would also call himself Count de Farussi (using his mother's maiden name) and when Pope Clement XIII presented Casanova with the Papal Order of the Golden Spur, he had an impressive cross and ribbon to display on his chest.

Back in Paris, he set about one of his most outrageous schemes—convincing his old dupe the Marquise d'Urfé that he could turn her into a young man through occult means. The plan did not yield Casanova the big payoff he had hoped for, and the Marquise d'Urfé finally lost faith in him.

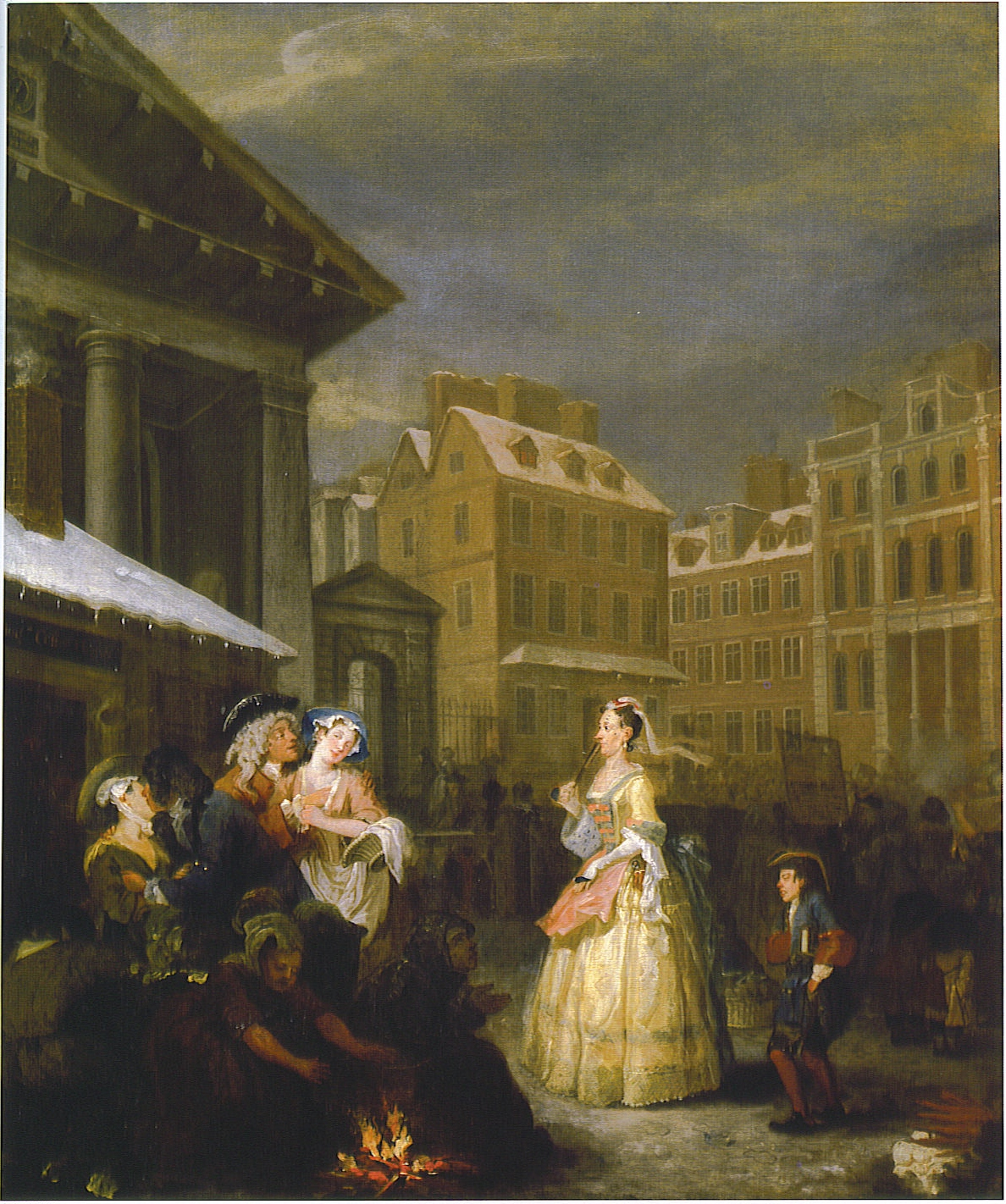
18th-century London by William Hogarth

Casanova traveled to England in 1763, hoping to sell his idea of a state lottery to British officials. He wrote that the English "have a character not found elsewhere and common to the whole nation, which makes them think themselves superior to all others. This is a supposition common to all nations, each thinks itself the first. They are all right." Through his connections, he worked his way up to an audience with George III, using most of the valuables he had stolen from the Marquise d'Urfé. While working the political angles, he also spent much time in the bedroom, as was his habit. As a means to find females for his pleasure, not being able to speak English, he put an advertisement in the newspaper to let an apartment to the "right" person. He interviewed many young women, choosing one "Mistress Pauline" who suited him well. Soon, he established himself in her apartment and seduced her. These and other liaisons, however, left him weak with venereal disease and he left England impoverished and ill.

He went on to the Austrian Netherlands, recovered, and then for the next three years, traveled all over Europe, covering about 4,500 miles (7,200 km) by coach over rough roads, and going as far as Moscow and Saint Petersburg (the average daily coach trip being about 30 miles (48 km)). Again, his principal goal was to sell his lottery scheme to other governments and repeat the great success he had with the French government, but a meeting with Frederick the Great bore no fruit and in the surrounding German lands, the same result. Lacking neither connections nor confidence, Casanova went to Russia and met with Catherine the Great, but she flatly turned down the lottery idea.

In 1766, he was expelled from Warsaw following a pistol duel with Colonel Franciszek Ksawery Branicki over an Italian actress, a lady friend of theirs. Both duelists were wounded, Casanova on the left hand. The hand recovered on its own, after Casanova refused the recommendation of doctors that it be amputated. From Warsaw, he traveled to Breslau in the Kingdom of Prussia, then to Dresden, where he contracted yet another venereal infection. He returned to Paris for several months in 1767 and hit the gambling salons, only to be expelled from France by order of Louis XV himself, primarily for Casanova's scam involving the Marquise d'Urfé. Now known across Europe for his reckless behavior, Casanova would have difficulty overcoming his notoriety and gaining any fortune, so he headed for Spain, where he was not as notorious. He tried his usual approach, leaning on well-placed contacts (often Freemasons), wining and dining with nobles of influence, and finally arranging an audience with the local monarch, in this case Charles III. Casanova was present at the Spanish court in Madrid in July 1768, at the same time that the eye surgeon Felice Tadini was present at the Spanish court. Casanova later heard about the intraocular lens placed unsuccessfully after cataract surgery by Dresden oculist Casaamata in the 1790s, and in his memoirs Casanova falsely and anachronistically ascribed the idea to Tadini in Warsaw in 1766, but Casanova's claim is impossible because Tadini was actually in Constantinople in 1766. When no doors opened for Casanova at the Spanish court in 1768, Casanova could only roam across Spain, with little to show for it. In Barcelona, he escaped assassination and landed in jail for 6 weeks. His Spanish adventure a failure, he returned to France briefly, then to Italy.

=== Return to Venice ===
In Rome, Casanova had to prepare a way for his return to Venice. While waiting for friends to gain him legal entry into Venice, Casanova began his modern Tuscan-Italian translation of the Iliad, his History of the Troubles in Poland, and a comic play. To ingratiate himself with the Venetian authorities, Casanova did some commercial spying for them. After months without a recall, however, he wrote a letter of appeal directly to the Inquisitors. At last, he received his long-sought permission and burst into tears upon reading "We, Inquisitors of State, for reasons known to us, give Giacomo Casanova a free safe-conduct ... empowering him to come, go, stop, and return, hold communication wheresoever he pleases without let or hindrance. So is our will." Casanova was permitted to return to Venice in September 1774 after 18 years of exile.

At first, his return to Venice was a cordial one and he was a celebrity. Even the Inquisitors wanted to hear how he had escaped from their prison. Of his three bachelor patrons, however, only Dandolo was still alive and Casanova was invited back to live with him. He received a small stipend from Dandolo and hoped to live from his writings, but that was not enough. He reluctantly became a correspondent again for Venice, paid by piece work, reporting on religion, morals, and commerce, most of it based on gossip and rumor he picked up from social contacts. He was disappointed. No financial opportunities of interest came about and few doors opened for him in society as in the past.

At age 49, the years of reckless living and the thousands of miles of travel had taken their toll. Casanova's smallpox scars, sunken cheeks, and hook nose became all the more noticeable. His easygoing manner was now more guarded. Prince Charles de Ligne, a friend (and uncle of his future employer), described him around 1784:

He would be a good-looking man if he were not ugly; he is tall and built like Hercules, but of an African tint; eyes full of life and fire, but touchy, wary, rancorous—and this gives him a ferocious air. It is easier to put him in a rage than to make him gay. He laughs little, but makes others laugh. ... He has a manner of saying things which reminds me of Harlequin or Figaro, and which makes them sound witty.

— Quoted in Masters 1969, p. 257

Venice had changed for him. Casanova now had little money for gambling, few willing females worth pursuing, and few acquaintances to enliven his craven, impulsive tendencies. He heard of the death of his mother and, more paining, visited the deathbed of Bettina Gozzi, who had first introduced him to sex and who died in his arms. His Iliad was published in three volumes, but to limited subscribers and yielding little money. He got into a published dispute with Voltaire over religion. When he asked, "Suppose that you succeed in destroying superstition. With what will you replace it?" Voltaire shot back, "I like that. When I deliver humanity from a ferocious beast which devours it, can I be asked what I shall put in its place." From Casanova's point of view, if Voltaire had "been a proper philosopher, he would have kept silent on that subject ... the people need to live in ignorance for the general peace of the nation".

In 1779, Casanova found Francesca, an uneducated seamstress, who became his live-in lover and housekeeper, and who loved him devotedly. Later that year, the Inquisitors put him on the payroll and sent him to investigate commerce between the papal states and Venice. Other publishing and theater ventures failed, primarily from lack of capital. In a downward spiral, Casanova was expelled again from Venice in 1783, after writing a vicious satire poking fun at Venetian nobility. In it, he declared that Grimani was his true father.

Forced to resume his travels again, Casanova arrived in Paris, and in November 1783 met Benjamin Franklin while attending a presentation on aeronautics and the future of balloon transport. For a while, Casanova served as secretary and pamphleteer to Sebastian Foscarini, Venetian ambassador in Vienna. He also became acquainted with Lorenzo Da Ponte, Mozart's librettist, who noted about Casanova, "This singular man never liked to be in the wrong." Notes by Casanova indicate that he may have made suggestions to Da Ponte concerning the libretto for Mozart's Don Giovanni.

=== Final years in Bohemia ===
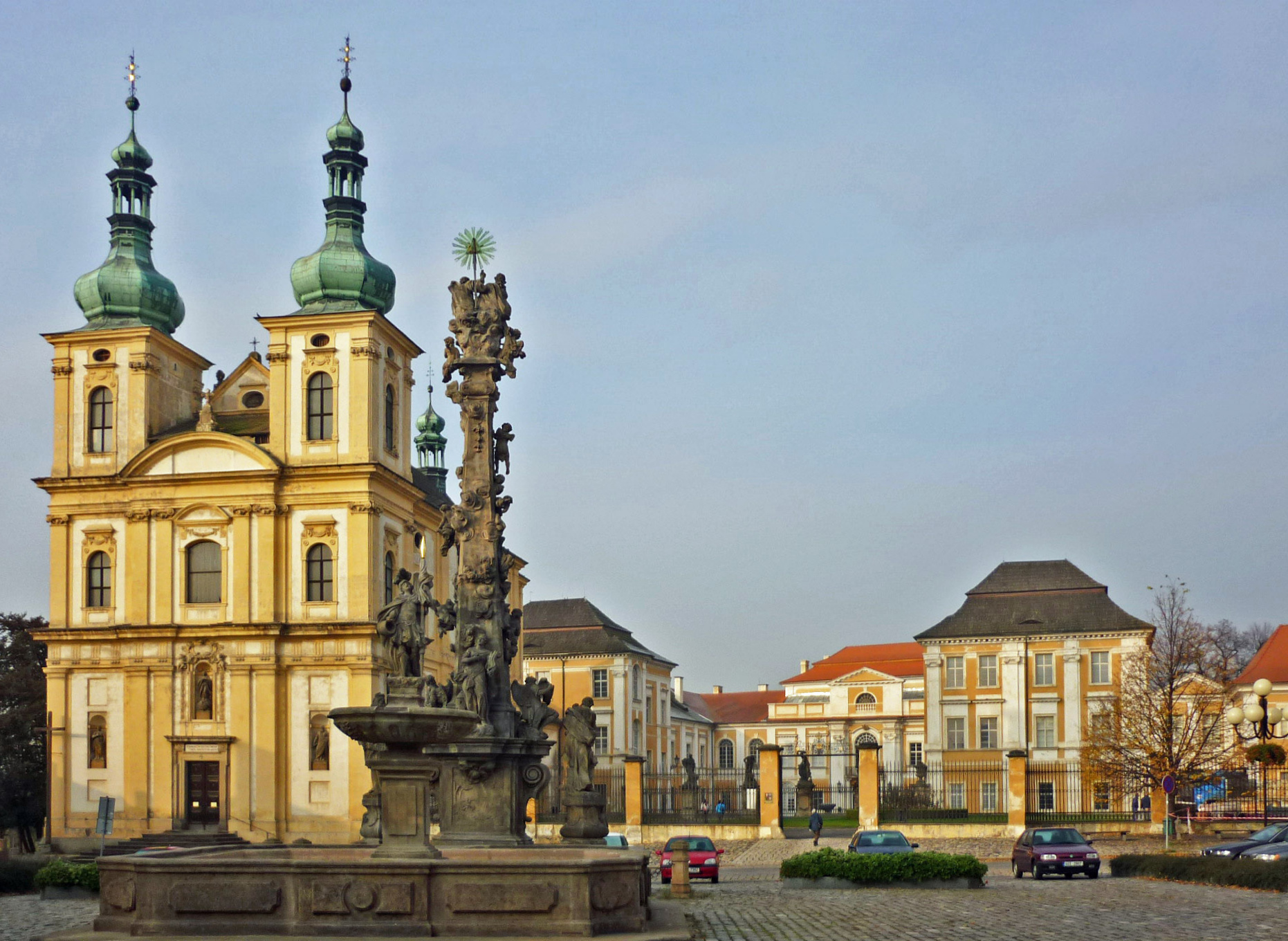
Dux Castle

In 1785, after Foscarini died, Casanova began searching for another position. A few months later, he became the librarian to Count Joseph Karl von Waldstein, a chamberlain of the emperor, in the Castle of Dux, Bohemia (now the Czech Republic). The count—himself a Freemason, cabalist, and frequent traveler—had taken to Casanova when they had met a year earlier at Foscarini's residence. Although the job offered security and good pay, Casanova describes his last years as boring and frustrating, though it was a productive time for him in writing. His health had deteriorated dramatically, and he found life among peasants to be less than stimulating. He was only able to make occasional visits to Vienna and Dresden for relief. Although Casanova got on well with the count, his employer was a much younger man with his own eccentricities. The count often ignored him at meals and failed to introduce him to important visiting guests. Moreover, Casanova, the testy outsider, was thoroughly disliked by most of the other inhabitants of the Castle of Dux. Casanova's only friends seemed to be his fox terriers. In despair, Casanova considered suicide, but instead decided that he must live on to record his memoirs, which he did until his death.

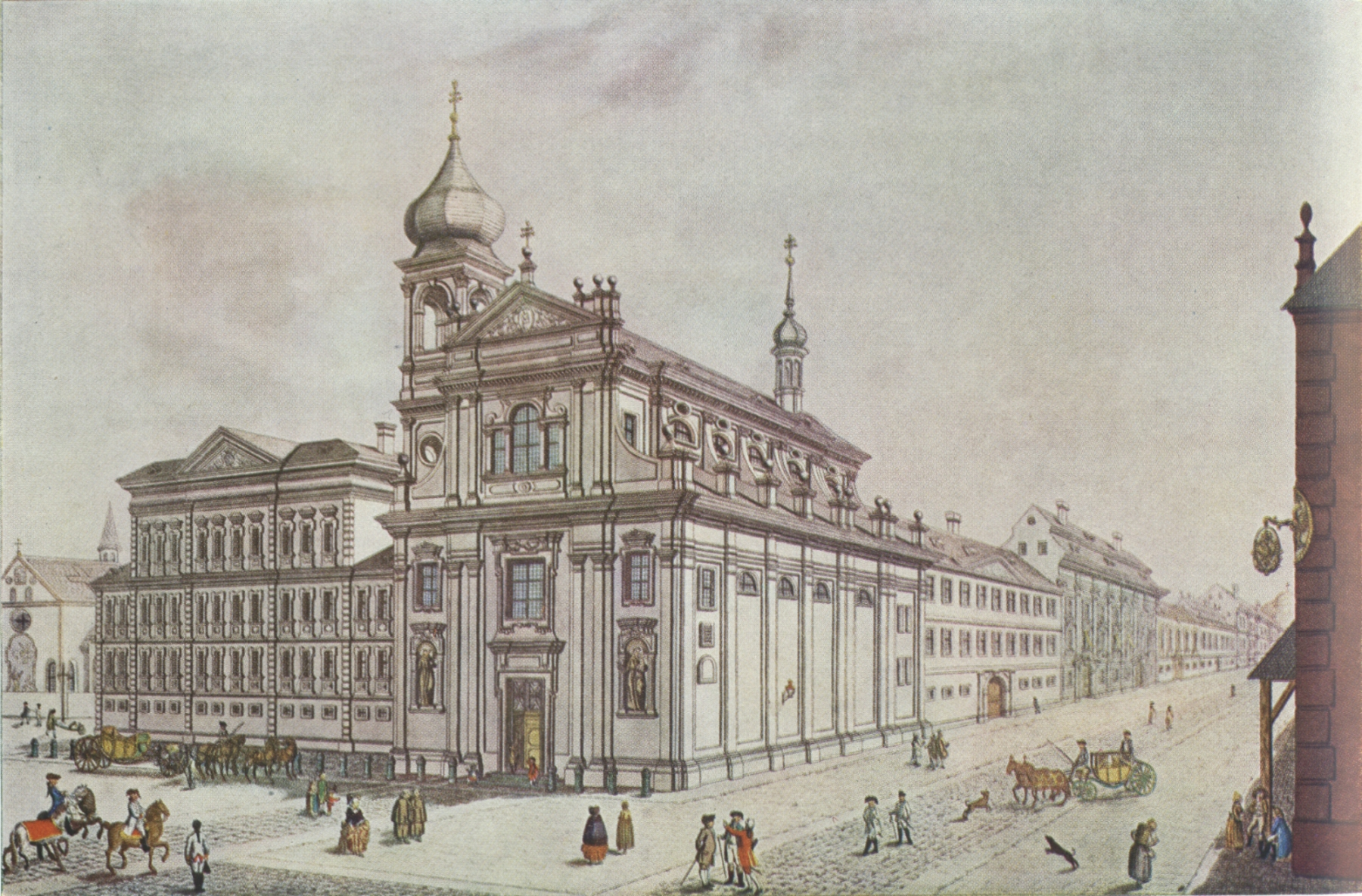
Prague in 1785

He visited Prague, the capital city and principal cultural center of Bohemia, on many occasions. In October 1787, he met Lorenzo da Ponte, the librettist of Wolfgang Amadeus Mozart's opera Don Giovanni, in Prague at the time of the opera's first production and likely met the composer, as well, at the same time. There is reason to believe that he was also in Prague in 1791 for the coronation of Holy Roman Emperor Leopold II as king of Bohemia, an event that included the first production of Mozart's opera La clemenza di Tito. Casanova is known to have drafted dialogue suitable for a Don Juan drama at the time of his visit to Prague in 1787, but none of his verses were ever incorporated into Mozart's Don Giovanni.

In 1797, word arrived that the Republic of Venice had ceased to exist and that Napoleon Bonaparte had seized Casanova's home city. It was too late to return home. Casanova died on 4 June 1798 at the age of 73. His last words are said to have been "I have lived as a philosopher and I die as a Christian". Casanova was buried at Dux (nowadays Duchcov in the Czech Republic), but the location of his grave has been forgotten.

== Memoirs ==
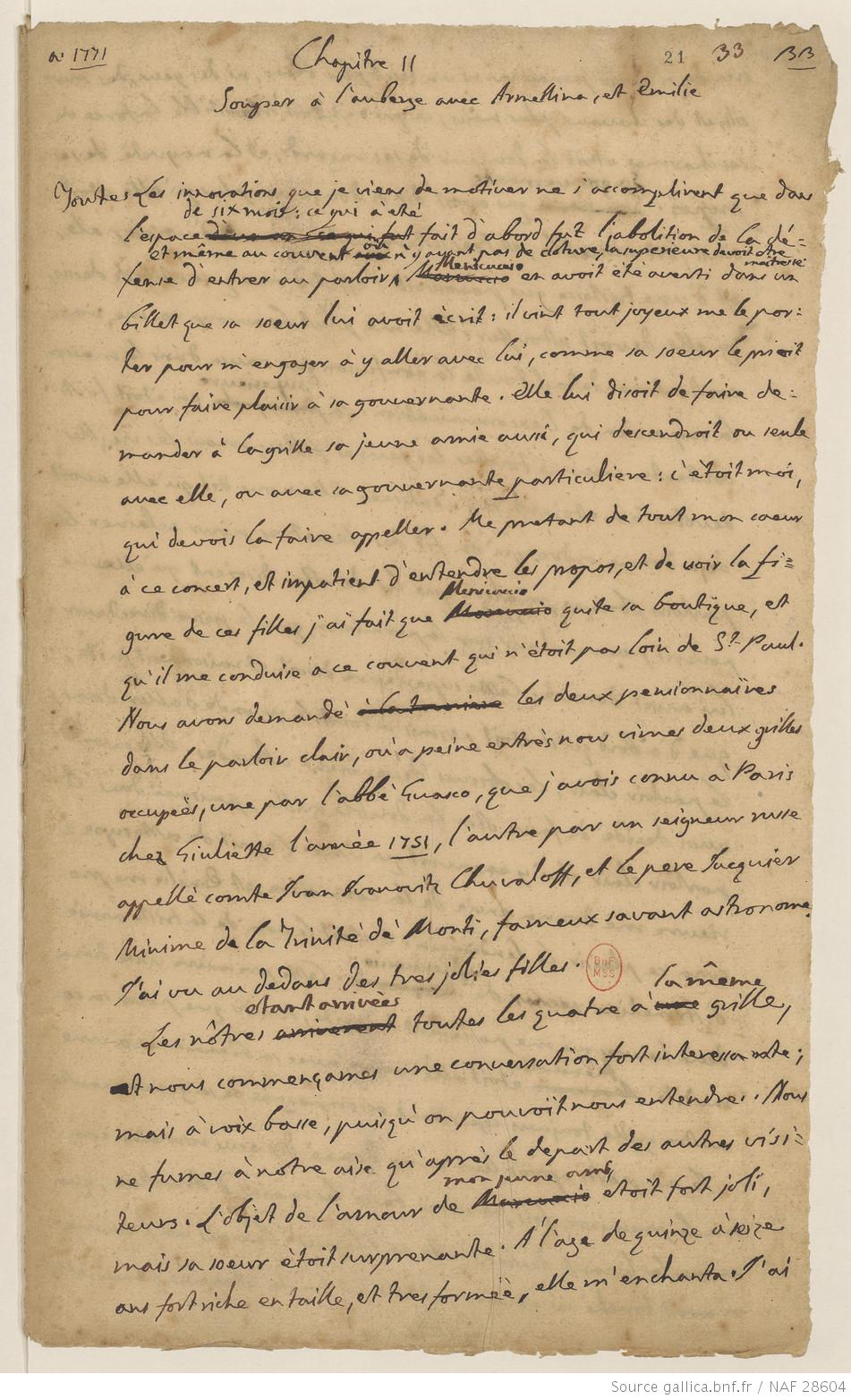
Page from the autograph manuscript of Histoire de ma vie

In his last years, Casanova focused without distractions on his Histoire de ma vie. He began to think about writing his memoirs around 1780 and began in earnest by 1789, as "the only remedy to keep from going mad or dying of grief". The first draft was completed by July 1792, and he spent the next six years revising it. He puts a happy face on his days of loneliness, writing in his work, "I can find no pleasanter pastime than to converse with myself about my own affairs and to provide a most worthy subject for laughter to my well-bred audience." His memoirs were still being compiled at the time of his death, his account having reached only the summer of 1774. A letter by him in 1792 states that he was reconsidering his decision to publish them, believing that his story was despicable and he would make enemies by writing the truth about his affairs, but he decided to proceed, using initials instead of actual names and toning down the strongest passages. He wrote in French instead of Italian because "the French language is more widely known than mine".

The memoirs open with:

I begin by declaring to my reader that, by everything good or bad that I have done throughout my life, I am sure that I have earned merit or incurred guilt, and that hence I must consider myself a free agent. ... Despite an excellent moral foundation, the inevitable fruit of the divine principles which were rooted in my heart, I was all my life the victim of my senses; I have delighted in going astray and I have constantly lived in error, with no other consolation than that of knowing I have erred. ... My follies are the follies of youth. You will see that I laugh at them, and if you are kind you will laugh at them with me.

Casanova wrote about the purpose of his book:

I expect the friendship, the esteem, and the gratitude of my readers. Their gratitude, if reading my memoirs will have given them instruction and pleasure. Their esteem if, doing me justice, they will have found that I have more virtues than faults; and their friendship as soon as they come to find me deserving of it by the frankness and good faith with which I submit myself to their judgment without in any way disguising what I am.

He also advises his readers that they "will not find all my adventures. I have left out those which would have offended the people who played a part in them, for they would cut a sorry figure in them. Even so, there are those who will sometimes think me too indiscreet; I am sorry for it." In the final chapter, the text abruptly breaks off with hints at adventures unrecorded: "[T]hree years later I saw her in Padua, where I resumed my acquaintance with her daughter on far more tender terms."

In their original publication, the memoirs were divided into twelve volumes, and the unabridged English translation by Willard R. Trask runs to more than 3,500 pages. Though his chronology is at times confusing and inaccurate, and many of his tales exaggerated, much of his narrative and many details are corroborated by contemporary writings. He has a good ear for dialogue and writes at length about all classes of society. Casanova, for the most part, is candid about his faults, intentions, and motivations, and shares his successes and failures with good humor. The confession is largely devoid of repentance or remorse. He celebrates the senses with his readers, especially regarding music, food, and women. "I have always liked highly seasoned dishes. ... As for women, I have always found that the one I was in love with smelled good, and the more copious her sweat the sweeter I found it." He mentions over 120 sexual/romantic escapades with women and girls, with several veiled references to male lovers as well. (Notes that Casanova made in preparation for the work, discovered at the Castle of Dux in Bohemia, indicate that he self-censored his sexual affairs with men and boys. Rejected episodes include "My love for the Giton of the Duke of Elbeuf", "Pederasty with Bazin, and his sisters", and "Pederasty with X at Dunkirk".) He describes his duels and conflicts with scoundrels and officials, his entrapments and his escapes, his schemes and plots, his anguish and his sighs of pleasure.

The manuscript of Casanova's memoirs was held by his relatives until it was sold to F. A. Brockhaus publishers, and first published in heavily abridged versions in German around 1822, then in French. During World War II, the manuscript survived the Allied bombing of Leipzig. According to librarian and scholar Lawrence Clark Powell, "Ever since Casanova's Memoirs first appeared in print, nearly a century ago, they have been recognized as a masterpiece of autobiography." They were heavily pirated through the ages and have been translated into some twenty languages. Not until 1960 was the entire text published in its original language of French. In 2010 the manuscript was acquired by the National Library of France, which has started digitizing it.

== Relationships ==
For Casanova, as well as his local contemporaries of the upper class, love and sex tended to be casual and not endowed with the solemnity characteristic of other Romantic literary works of the 19th century. Flirtations, bedroom games, and short-term liaisons were common among nobles who married for social connections rather than love.

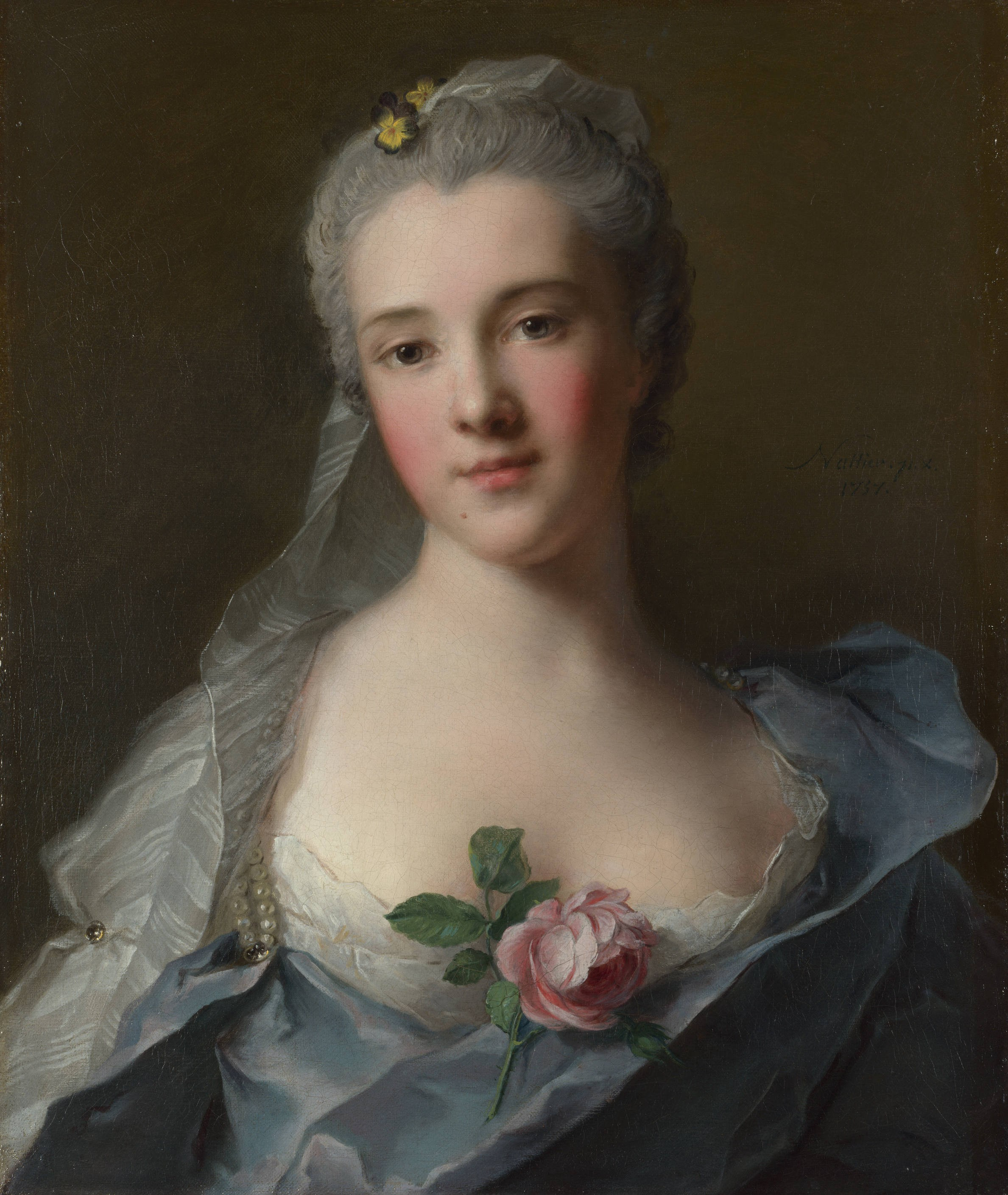
Portrait of Manon Balletti by Jean-Marc Nattier (1757)

Multi-faceted and complex, Casanova's personality, as he described it, was dominated by his sensual urges: "Cultivating whatever gave pleasure to my senses was always the chief business of my life; I have never found any occupation more important. Feeling that I was born for the sex opposite to mine, I have always loved it and done all that I could to make myself loved by it." He noted that he sometimes used "assurance caps" to prevent impregnating his mistresses.

Casanova's ideal liaison had elements beyond sex, including complicated plots, heroes and villains, and gallant outcomes. In a pattern he often repeated, he would discover an attractive woman in trouble with a brutish or jealous lover (Act I); he would ameliorate her difficulty (Act II); she would show her gratitude; he would seduce her; a short exciting affair would ensue (Act III); feeling a loss of ardor or boredom setting in, he would plead his unworthiness and arrange for her marriage or pairing with a worthy man, then exit the scene (Act IV). As William Bolitho points out in Twelve Against the Gods, the secret of Casanova's success with women "had nothing more esoteric in it than [offering] what every woman who respects herself must demand: all that he had, all that he was, with (to set off the lack of legality) the dazzling attraction of the lump sum over what is more regularly doled out in a lifetime of installments". Casanova proclaims, "There is no honest woman with an uncorrupted heart whom a man is not sure of conquering by dint of gratitude. It is one of the surest and shortest means." Alcohol and violence, for him, were not proper tools of seduction. Instead, attentiveness and small favors should be employed to soften a woman's heart, but "a man who makes known his love by words is a fool". Verbal communication is essential—"without speech, the pleasure of love is diminished by at least two-thirds"—but words of love must be implied, not boldly proclaimed.

Casanova claimed to value intelligence in a woman: "After all, a beautiful woman without a mind of her own leaves her lover with no resource after he had physically enjoyed her charms." His attitude toward educated women, however, was an unfavorable one: "In a woman learning is out of place; it compromises the essential qualities of her sex. ... No scientific discoveries have been made by women. To go plus ultra requires a vigor which the female sex cannot have. But in simple reasoning and in delicacy of feeling we must yield to women."

== Gambling ==
Gambling was a common recreation in the social and political circles in which Casanova moved. In his memoirs, Casanova discusses many forms of 18th-century gambling—including lotteries, faro, basset, piquet, biribi, primero, quinze, and whist—and the passion for it among the nobility and the high clergy. Cheats (known as "correctors of fortune") were somewhat more tolerated than today in public casinos and in private games for invited players, and seldom caused affront. Most gamblers were on guard against cheaters and their tricks. Scams of all sorts were common, and Casanova was amused by them.

Casanova gambled throughout his adult life, winning and losing large sums. He was tutored by professionals, and he was "instructed in those wise maxims without which games of chance ruin those who participate in them". He was not above occasionally cheating and at times even teamed with professional gamblers for his own profit. Casanova claims that he was "relaxed and smiling when I lost, and I won without covetousness". However, when outrageously duped himself, he could act violently, sometimes calling for a duel. Casanova admits that he was not disciplined enough to be a professional gambler: "I had neither prudence enough to leave off when fortune was adverse, nor sufficient control over myself when I had won." Nor did he like being considered as a professional gambler: "Nothing could ever be adduced by professional gamblers that I was of their infernal clique." Although Casanova at times used gambling tactically and shrewdly—for making quick money, for flirting, making connections, acting gallantly, or proving himself a gentleman among his social superiors—his practice also could be compulsive and reckless, especially during the euphoria of a new sexual affair. "Why did I gamble when I felt the losses so keenly? What made me gamble was avarice. I loved to spend, and my heart bled when I could not do it with money won at cards."

== Fame and influence ==
To his contemporaries Casanova was not known as a gross sensualist. While the police archives of Paris and Vienna listed him as a dangerous adventurer, intellectuals recognized him as a man of far-ranging intellect and curiosity. The prolific Belgian author and diplomat Charles-Joseph de Ligne thought Casanova the most interesting man he had ever met: "there is nothing in the world of which he is not capable".

"Casanova", like "Don Juan", is a long established term in the English language. According to Merriam Webster's Collegiate Dictionary, 11th ed., the noun Casanova means "Lover; esp: a man who is a promiscuous and unscrupulous lover". The first usage of the term in written English was around 1852. References in culture to Casanova are numerous—in books, films, theater, and music.

== In popular culture ==
=== Film ===
Casanova (1918)

- Casanova (1918), a Hungarian film
- The Loves of Casanova, or Casanova, a 1927 French film starring Ivan Mozzhukhin
- Il cavaliere misterioso (The Mysterious Rider), a 1948 film by Riccardo Freda, in which Casanova is played by Vittorio Gassman in his debut as a lead actor
- Poslední růže od Casanovy (The Last Rose from Casanova), a 1966 Czech film by Václav Krska, in which Casanova is played by Felix Le Breux
- Giacomo Casanova: Childhood and Adolescence, a 1969 feature film by Luigi Comencini, starring Leonard Whiting
- Fellini's Casanova, a 1976 feature film by Federico Fellini, starring Donald Sutherland
- La Nuit de Varennes (1982), a film featuring Marcello Mastroianni
- Casanova (1987), a television movie, starring Richard Chamberlain
- Le Retour de Casanova (1992), a French comedy starring Alain Delon
- Casanova (2005), a feature film featuring Heath Ledger, Sienna Miller, Charlie Cox, and Lena Olin
- Nine (2009), a live-action feature film directed by Rob Marshall, based on the Broadway musical of the same name (see below)
- Casanova Variations (2014), a feature film starring John Malkovich
- Een schitterend gebrek (A Beautiful Imperfection) (2024), a film based on the historical novel "In Lucia's Eyes" by Arthur Japin

=== Music ===
- "The Grand Canal" (1983), an extended ensemble piece within the Broadway musical Nine (music and lyrics by Maury Yeston), which presents the romantic entanglements of its central character in terms of Casanova's legendary sexual exploits
- Casanova Fantasy Variations for Three Celli (1985), a piece for cello trio by Walter Burle-Marx
- "Casanova" (1987) song by R&B group LeVert. The song reached number 1 on the R&B chart as well as reaching number 5 on the pop chart.
- Casanova (1996), an album by the UK chamber pop band The Divine Comedy, inspired by Casanova
- "Casanova 70" (1997), a single by French electronic duo Air
- Casanova (2000), a piece for cello and winds by Johan de Meij
- "Casanova in Hell" (2006), a song by the UK group Pet Shop Boys, from their album Fundamental

=== Performance works ===
- Casanova (1923), a comic opera in three acts with prologue and epilogue, by Ludomir Różycki
- Casanova (1928), an operetta by Ralph Benatzky, based on music by Johann Strauss Jr.
- Camino Real (1953), a play by Tennessee Williams, in which an aging Casanova appears in a dream sequence
- Nine (1982), a Tony-award-winning Broadway musical by Maury Yeston and Arthur Kopit (based on the 1963 film 8½ by Frederico Fellini), in which the central character, an Italian film director experiencing an emotional breakdown, imagines creating a movie spectacular about Casanova
- Casanova's Homecoming (1985), an opera by Dominick Argento
- Casanova (2007), a play by Carol Ann Duffy and Told by an Idiot theatre company, starring Hayley Carmichael as a female Casanova
- Casanova (2008), a musical by Philip Godfrey, first performed at the Greenwich Playhouse, London
- Casanova (2016), a pasticcio opera by Julian Perkins and Stephen Pettitt, first performed in the Baroque Unwrapped series at Kings Place, London
- Casanova (2017), a ballet by Northern Ballet, choreographed by Kenneth Tindall and based on the biography by Ian Kelly
- Casanova (2019), a musical performed by Takarazuka Revue and starring Rio Asumi as Casanova

=== Television ===
- Casanova, a 1971 BBC Television serial, written by Dennis Potter and starring Frank Finlay
- Casanova auf Schloss Dux (Casanova at Duchcov Chateau), a 1981 teleplay from the comedy by Karl Gassauer of the same title
- Casanova, a 2005 BBC Television serial written by Russell T. Davies, featuring David Tennant as young Casanova and Peter O'Toole as the older Casanova
- In 2017, an episode of Horrible Histories called "Ridiculous Romantics" featured Tom Stourton, portraying Casanova
- In 2024, episode 5 of Time Bandits has Casanova visiting the Earl of Sandwich and making all the ladies faint

=== Written works ===
- Casanovas Heimfahrt (Casanova's Homecoming) (1918) by Arthur Schnitzler
- The Venetian Glass Nephew (1925) by Elinor Wylie, in which Casanova appears as a major character under the transparent pseudonym "Chevalier de Chastelneuf"
- Széljegyzetek Casanovához (Marginalia on Casanova) (1939) by Miklós Szentkuthy
- Vendégjáték Bolzanóban (Conversations in Bolzano or Casanova in Bolzano) (1940), a novel by Sándor Márai
- Le Bonheur ou le Pouvoir (1980), by Pierre Kast
- The Fortunes of Casanova and Other Stories (1994), by Rafael Sabatini, includes nine stories (originally published 1914–1921) based on incidents in Casanova's memoirs
- Casanova (1998), a novel by Andrew Miller
- Casanova, Dernier Amour (2000), by Pascal Lainé
- Casanova in Bohemia (2002), a novel about Casanova's last years at Dux, Bohemia, by Andrei Codrescu
- Een Schitterend Gebrek (English title In Lucia's Eyes), a 2003 Dutch novel by Arthur Japin, in which Casanova's youthful amour Lucia is viewed as the love of his life
- "A Disciple of Plato", a short story by English writer Robert Aickman, first printed in the 2015 posthumous collection The Strangers and Other Writings, in which the main character—throughout described as "the philosopher"—is revealed in the last lines to be Casanova

=== Comics ===
- Giacomo C., a Belgian 15-album comic series by Jean Dufaux and Griffo featuring a protagonist based on Casanova.

== Works ==
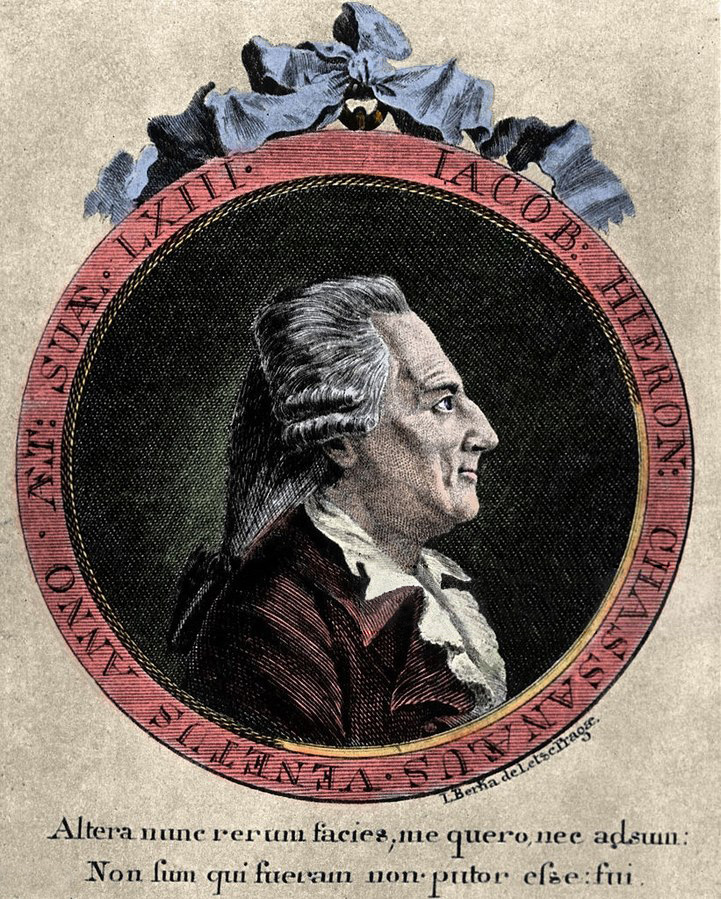
Casanova in 1788

- 1752 – Zoroastro: Tragedia tradotta dal Francese, da rappresentarsi nel Regio Elettoral Teatro di Dresda, dalla compagnia de' comici italiani in attuale servizio di Sua Maestà nel carnevale dell'anno MDCCLII. Dresden.
- 1753 – La Moluccheide, o Sia i gemelli rivali. Dresden.
- 1769 – Confutazione della Storia del Governo Veneto d'Amelot de la Houssaie. Lugano.
- 1772 – Lana caprina: Epistola di un licantropo. Bologna.
- 1774 – Istoria delle turbolenze della Polonia. Gorizia.
- 1775–1778 – Dell'Iliade di Omero tradotta in ottava rima. Venice.
- 1779 – Scrutinio del libro Eloges de M. de Voltaire par différents auteurs. Venice.
- 1780 – Opuscoli miscellanei (containing Duello a Varsavia and Lettere della nobil donna Silvia Belegno alla nobil donzella Laura Gussoni). Venice.
- 1780–1781 – Le messager de Thalie. Venice.
- 1782 – Di aneddoti viniziani militari ed amorosi del secolo decimoquarto sotto i dogadi di Giovanni Gradenigo e di Giovanni Dolfin. Venice.
- 1783 – Né amori né donne, ovvero La stalla ripulita. Venice.
- 1786 – Soliloque d'un penseur. Prague.
- 1787 – Icosaméron, ou Histoire d'Édouard et d'Élisabeth qui passèrent quatre-vingts un ans chez les Mégamicres, habitants aborigènes du Protocosme dans l'intérieur de nôtre globe. Prague.
- 1788 – Histoire de ma fuite des prisons de la République de Venise qu'on appelle les Plombs. Leipzig.
- 1790 – Solution du probléme deliaque. Dresden.
- 1790 – Corollaire à la duplication de l'hexaèdre. Dresden.
- 1790 – Démonstration géometrique de la duplication du cube. Dresden.
- 1797 – A Léonard Snetlage, docteur en droit de l'Université de Goettingue, Jacques Casanova, docteur en droit de l'Universitè de Padou. Dresden.
- 1822–1829 – First edition of the Histoire de ma vie, in an adapted German translation in 12 volumes, as Aus den Memoiren des Venetianers Jacob Casanova de Seingalt, oder sein Leben, wie er es zu Dux in Böhmen niederschrieb. The first full edition of the original French manuscript was not published until 1960, by Brockhaus (Wiesbaden) and Plon (Paris).

== See also ==
- Casanova's Lottery
- Manon Balletti
