= Gaetano Casanova =

Italian actor and ballet dancer (1697–1733)

Gaetano Casanova (2 April 1697, Parma – 18 December 1733, Venice) was an Italian actor and ballet dancer. His eldest son was the famous adventurer, Giacomo Casanova.

== Biography ==
Gaetano Giuseppe Giacomo Casanova was born to Giacomo Casanova and his wife, Anna Roli. His older brother, Giambattista, left home in 1712 and was never heard from again. Gaetano followed suit the following year, having become infatuated with Giovanna Benozzi (1662 - c. 1750), a Commedia dell'arte actress who went by the name of "La Fragoletta" ("The Little Strawberry"). Because of the difference in age, nothing came of it and she married Francesco Balletti, from a family of famous actors, who specialized in the role of Harlequin.

In 1723, he left the troupe and went to Venice, where he found a position at the Teatro San Samuele, owned by the Grimani family. Near the place where he was staying, there was a shoemaker's shop owned by a certain Girolamo Farussi, who had an attractive daughter, known as Zanetta. The following year, against her parents' wishes, she married Gaetano. Her father died shortly after, from grief, according to Giacomo, and her mother, Marcia, was reconciled to the union only when Gaetano promised that he would not allow Zanetta to become an actress.

In 1725, their first child, Giacomo, was born. According to Giacomo's memoirs, Gaetano suspected Michele Grimani, the theatre's proprietor, of being the actual father. The next year, despite his promise, he and Zanetta went to London on a tour with a popular Italian acting company, leaving Giacomo in the care of Zanetta's mother. They eventually had five more children; Francesco and Giovanni, who both became painters, Faustina Maddalena (1731–1736), Maria Maddalena (1732–1800) and Gaetano Alvise (1734–1783), who became a priest; born two months after his father died.

In 1733, he developed an abscess on his ear that became infected. He died eight days later. Two days before his death, he called all of his friends and relatives to his bedside, where the Grimanis pledged to take care of his wife and children.
