= Christian Friedrich Boetius =

German engraver (1706–1782)

- Born: 1 April 1706; Leipzig, Electorate of Saxony, Holy Roman Empire
- Died: 13 December 1782 (aged 76); Dresden, Electorate of Saxony, Holy Roman Empire
- Occupation: Engraver

Christian Friedrich Boetius (or Boece; 1 April 1706 – 13 December 1782) was a German engraver.

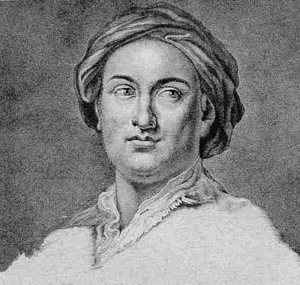
Giovanni Battista Casanova, after a painting of Anton Raphael Mengs.

Born at Leipzig, he was a pupil of Paul Christian Zink and C. A. Wartmann, and resided chiefly at Dresden, where he was made professor of the Electoral Academy in 1764. He engraved several of the plates for the Dresden Gallery, some portraits, and various other subjects. He died at Dresden in 1782. The following are among his best prints:

- Landscape with a Monument; after Bartholomeus Breenbergh.
- La Notte; after Antonio da Correggio.
- The Meyer Madonna; after Hans Holbein the Younger (one of his best works).
- Landscape with a Cow and Sheep; after Karel du Jardin.
- A Woman holding a Pot with Coals, and a Boy blowing; after Peter Paul Rubens.
- Sportsmen at the Door of an Inn; after Philips Wouwerman.
- Interior of an Inn; after Thomas Wijck.
- The Portrait of Boetius; in imitation of a chalk drawing. 1771.
- Portrait of Charles Hutin; the same.
- Portrait of Anton Raphael Mengs; the same.
- Portrait of Giovanni Battista Casanova: the same. (pictured)
