= Jeanne Camus de Pontcarré =

French aristocrat and eccentric widow

Jeanne de la Rochefoucauld, marquise d’Urfé
- Born: Jeanne Camus de Pontcarré; 1705; Kingdom of France
- Died: 13 November 1775 (age 70)
- Other name: Madame d’Urfé
- Occupation: Aristocrat
- Father: Nicolas Pierre Camus de Pontcarré

Jeanne Camus de Pontcarré, marquise d’Urfé (1705–1775) was a French aristocrat and eccentric widow, with a passion for the occult and alchemy. Rich and gullible, she is better known under the name Madame d’Urfé from the biographies of several adventurers of the 18th century, such as Cagliostro and Casanova.

== Biography ==
=== Early life and marriage ===
Born in 1705, with the maiden name Jeanne Camus de Pontcarré, she was the daughter of Nicolas Pierre Camus de Pontcarré, the first president of the parliament of Rouen.

On 11 September 1724, she married Louis-Christophe de la Rochefoucauld-Lascaris (1704-1734), Marquis de Langeac and Urfé. They had three children:

- Alexandre-François (or Jean-Antoine-François), Marquis de Langeac (born 1733, died 20 October 1742).
- Adelaide-Marie-Thérèse, Marquise de Bagé and Langeac, Countess of Saint-Just (born 6 August 1727; married 7 May 1754 with Alexis Jean Marquis du Chatelet-Fresnières (?-1761); died ?).
- Agnes Marie of Rochefoucaud Lascaris d'Urfé (born 27 February 1732; married 4 April 1754 with Paul Edouard Colbert, lord of Estouteville, Count of Creuilly (?-1756); died 1 July 1756).

=== Widowhood ===
In 1734, her husband died, leaving her a twenty-nine-year-old widow with the freedom to devote her time and fortune to her alchemical ambitions (she is described by the Marquise de Créquy as "the most stubborn of the alchemists and the most determined complainers of her time"), before squandering the rest with occult adventurers.

This led her to meet the Count of St. Germain, with whom she worked for 4 years on trying to find the philosopher's stone, an endeavour which cost her nearly one hundred thousand écu. A few years later, she met the Count of Cagliostro, who made her spend four to five hundred thousand francs in an attempt to summon the spirits of Paracelsus and Moïtomut, who were supposed to reveal to him the last of the Grand Arcanum works.

In 1757, she lived in Paris on the Quai des Théatins (Quai Voltaire since 1791), next to the Hotel de Bouillon, where she met Casanova. By the middle of that year, Casanova had successfully treated the sciatica of her nephew, Nicolas de la Tour d'Auvergne (1720-?), with a pentagram and a few magic words. Excited by this accomplishment, de la Tour d'Auvergne introduced Casanova to his aunt, the Marquise d'Urfé.

According to his memoirs, Casanova convinced her that he possessed occult powers, and agreed to help her be reborn in a new body. For this endeavour, Madame d'Urfé (also his occasional lover) went on to finance his travels and research, also giving addresses and letters of recommendation. "She ended up falling into the hands of another Italian impostor, named Casanova, who had the delicacy to never ask her for money, but only for expensive gemstones in order to form constellations," said the Marquise de Créquy.

In 1763, she finally pressed Casanova to perform her rebirth. Casanova proposed to impregnate her with herself during a magical threesome ceremony, so that she might give birth to a male (supposed to hold more occult powers), in which her soul would be transmitted through childbirth. She broke off her relationship with him the same year, when a former accomplice of Casanova denounced his treachery in order to become her new wizard. In his memoirs, Casanova concealed this fact by alleging that Madame d'Urfé died that year.

In addition to her esoteric research, Madame d'Urfé heard voices and believed herself to be in regular communication with spirits. This is evoked several times by Casanova in his memoirs, as well as by Caroline of Hesse (1721-1774, wife of Louis IX of Hesse-Darmstadt), who wrote on 7 April 1758 "There's a Madame d'Urfé in Paris, clever woman, but who believes herself in communication with sylphs and genies."

Madame d'Urfé died on 13 November 1775 at the age of 70.
