= Walter Burle-Marx =

Brazilian composer

Walter Burle Marx (July 23, 1902, in São Paulo, Brazil – December 28, 1990, in Akron, USA) was a Brazilian pianist, conductor and composer.

== Biography ==
Born in São Paulo, he moved to Rio de Janeiro with his family in 1914, where he studied piano with Henrique Oswald. Praised as an outstanding conductor, he settled in the US in 1950, where he developed his career as a composer. Among his main works are his Cello Concerto and four symphonies.

Brother of the famous landscape architect Roberto Burle Marx, Walter took the first piano lessons with his mother at age 4 and, in 1913, he became a student of Luigi Chiaffarelli in São Paulo. Walter played his first recital at the age of 10. In 1914, he moved to Rio de Janeiro with his family to study with Henrique Oswald, who introduced him to his professional career.

Parallel to piano classes, Walter studied solfeggio and harmony with Agnello França between 1919 and 1921.

The Burle Marx family moved to Europe in 1921, where Walter took piano lessons with Heinrich Barth in Berlin. Barth used to be the teacher of the famous pianist Arthur Rubinstein. At that time, Walter also worked on fugue, counterpoint and composition with Friedrich E. Koch.

In 1926, Walter rebelled against the wishes of his family - who wanted him to focus only on piano - and started classes on orchestration and instrumentation in Berlin with E. N. von Reznicek, for two years. Reznicek, an Austrian of Czech descent, was considered a master of unfailing balance of sound.

Marx also finished the complete theoretical and practical course in conducting in Basel, Switzerland, with Felix Weingartner, between 1928 and 1929. Weingartner, an Austrian pupil of Franz Liszt, was considered a brilliant interpreter Beethoven and Mahler and a major conductor of orchestras in Vienna, Berlin, and Munich.

In 1930, back to Brazil, Burle Marx debuted as a conductor at Teatro Lírico, with the Orchestra of the Musical Center of Rio de Janeiro. The following year, he founded the Philharmonic Orchestra of Rio de Janeiro, promoting many concerts and premieres of symphonic works in Brazil, among them Beethoven's 9th Symphony. He also conducted the Philharmonic of the Municipal Theater at the inauguration of the statue of Christ the Redeemer, in Rio de Janeiro.

In 1932 he was appointed professor of the conducting course at the National Institute of Music, today Escola de Música at UFRJ, having been the 1st conductor of higher education in Brazil.

Walter decided spend some time in Europe and, in 1933, he made various recordings with Telefunken with the State Orchestra of Berlin, including his own Fantasy on the National Brazilian Anthem, which he authored. In 1934, he conducted the Hamburg, Munich, and Berlin Philharmonic orchestras as well as radio and opera orchestras there, playing Brazilian and other South American works.

In 1935, possessing extensive international experience in conducting after leading the Berlin Philharmonic, the Hamburg Philharmonic and the Washington National Symphony, among others, he decided to settle in the United States, where he became a teacher and guest conductor of the USA main orchestras. During this period, Walter also dedicated himself to the musical composition.

In 1939, he was chosen by the Brazilian government to be Music Director for the Brazilian Pavilion for the World's Fair in New York, where he conducted the New York Philharmonic Orchestra, presenting several premieres of works by Brazilian composers such as Heitor Villa-Lobos and Camargo Guarnieri, also introducing some of his own compositions.

Returning to Brazil for a period of two years between 1947 and 1949, he held the position of director of the Municipal Theater in Rio de Janeiro.

Back to the United States in 1952, besides guest conducting several orchestras in the country, he was mainly dedicated to composition and teaching. Between 1952 and 1977, Burle Marx held the position of professor at the Settlement Music School, Philadelphia.

Burle Marx returned to Brazil a few more times for concerts with the Radio MEC Symphony Orchestra - in 1967 and 1975. He conducted for the last time in Rio at the Teatro Municipal and at the Sala Cecilia Meireles, including two of his own pieces.

In 1987, Eugene Rausa created the Burle Marx Music Society, in the United States, to promote his music and that of other composers of the Americas. The Society's current President is composer and conductor Thiago Tiberio, who succeeded its second president, Brian Zahn, after his death in 2012.

Walter's music is managed by Thiago Tiberio via Tiberio Music Design & Publishing LLC, who publishes, licenses, and administers his compositions and copyrights. Urtext-quality performing editions of some works, e.g. Fantasia Sobre o Thema do Hymno Nacional, are already available, with more works forthcoming—including the two string quartets, the Divertimento a tre, and the Quintet for Flute and Strings "Brazil Picturesque".
