= Francesco Giuseppe Casanova =

Italian painter (1727–1803)

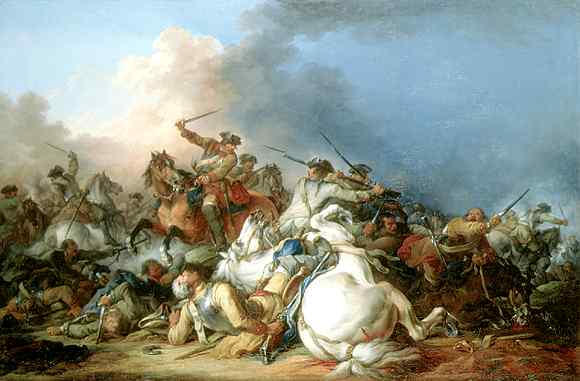
Cavalry Battle, currently in the Louvre

Francesco Giuseppe Casanova (1 June 1727, London – 8 July 1803, near Mödling) was an Italian painter who specialised in battle scenes. His older brother was Giacomo Casanova, the famous adventurer, and his younger brother was Giovanni Casanova; also a well-known painter.

== Biography ==
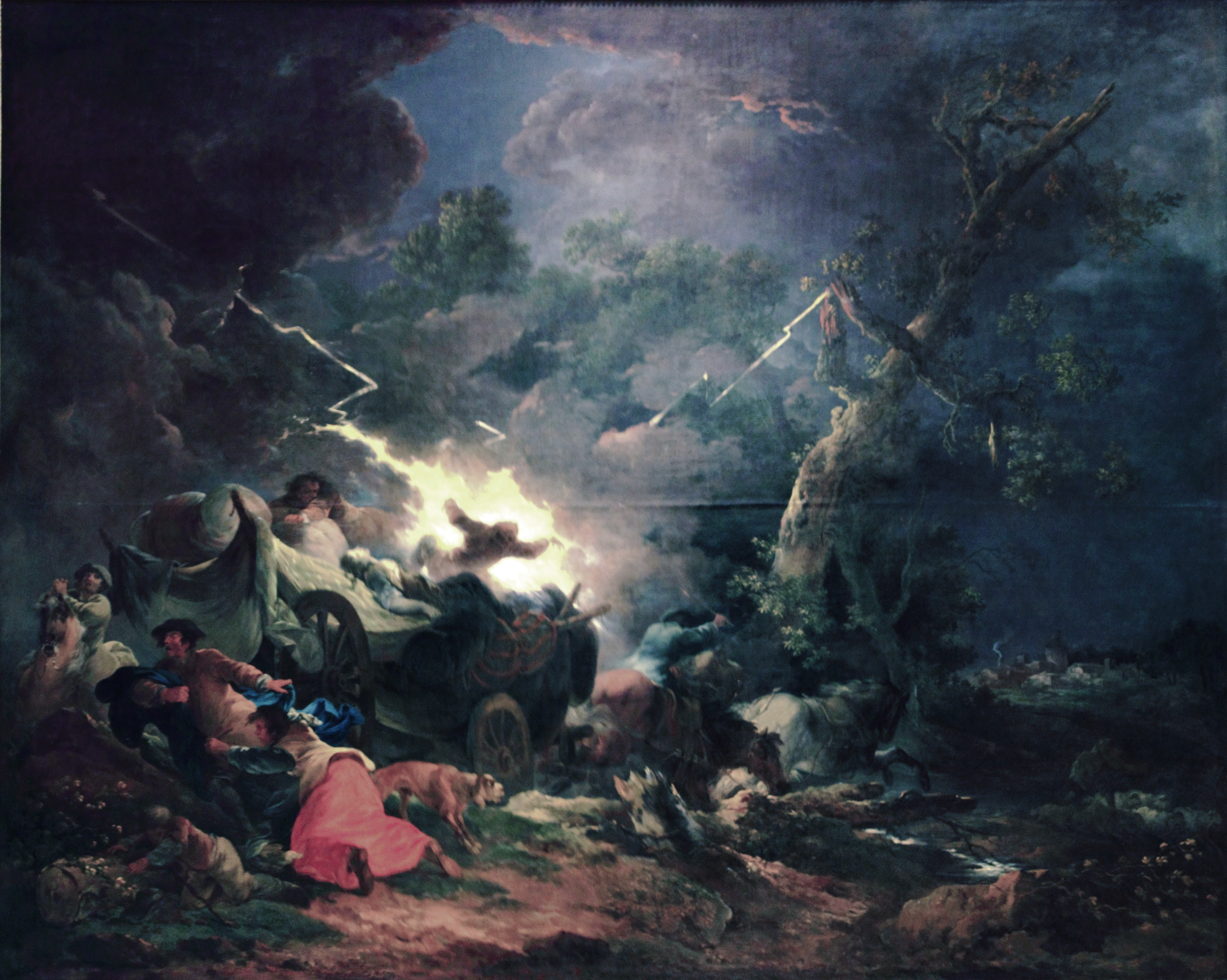
The Storm, one of four "disaster paintings"

He was born in London, where his parents, Zanetta Farussi, an actress, and Gaetano Casanova, an actor and dancer, had a theatrical engagement. It was rumoured that his father was actually the Prince of Wales (who shortly after became King George II); whether for scurrilous motives or publicity is unclear. They returned to Venice when he was still young and, after his father's death in 1733, he and his siblings were placed in the care of the Grimani family.

His career began in the workshops of Giovanni Antonio Guardi, a very unpleasant time for him, according to the memoirs of his brother Giacomo. Later, he moved to the studios of Antonio Joli, who was a set designer for the theatres owned by the Grimanis. This was also, apparently, unsatisfactory and he took up studies with the battle painter, Francesco Simonini. In 1751, upon his brother Giovanni's advice, he went to Paris and became an apprentice of Charles Parrocel. The following year, after Parrocel's death, he went to Dresden and spent a year studying the battle paintings at the "Gallery of the Electors of Saxony". In 1758, he returned to Paris and set himself up as a free-lance artist.

Success did not come immediately, and his first exhibition was a failure. In 1761, he became a supernumerary member of the Académie royale de peinture et de sculpture and was promoted to full member in 1763. As a result of favourable criticism from Denis Diderot, he began to receive commissions from the aristocracy. Diderot would later express negative opinions about Casanova's work, but his reputation was already made. His fame soon spread eastward and he received commissions from Catherine the Great for the Hermitage, beginning in 1768. Two years later, he produced his four famous "disaster paintings", which were purchased by Jean-Benjamin de la Borde on behalf of King Louis XV. In 1771, he exhibited two large canvases depicting scenes from the Thirty Years' War (The Battle of Freiburg and the Battle of Lens) and once again won Diderot's approval.

=== Personal life ===
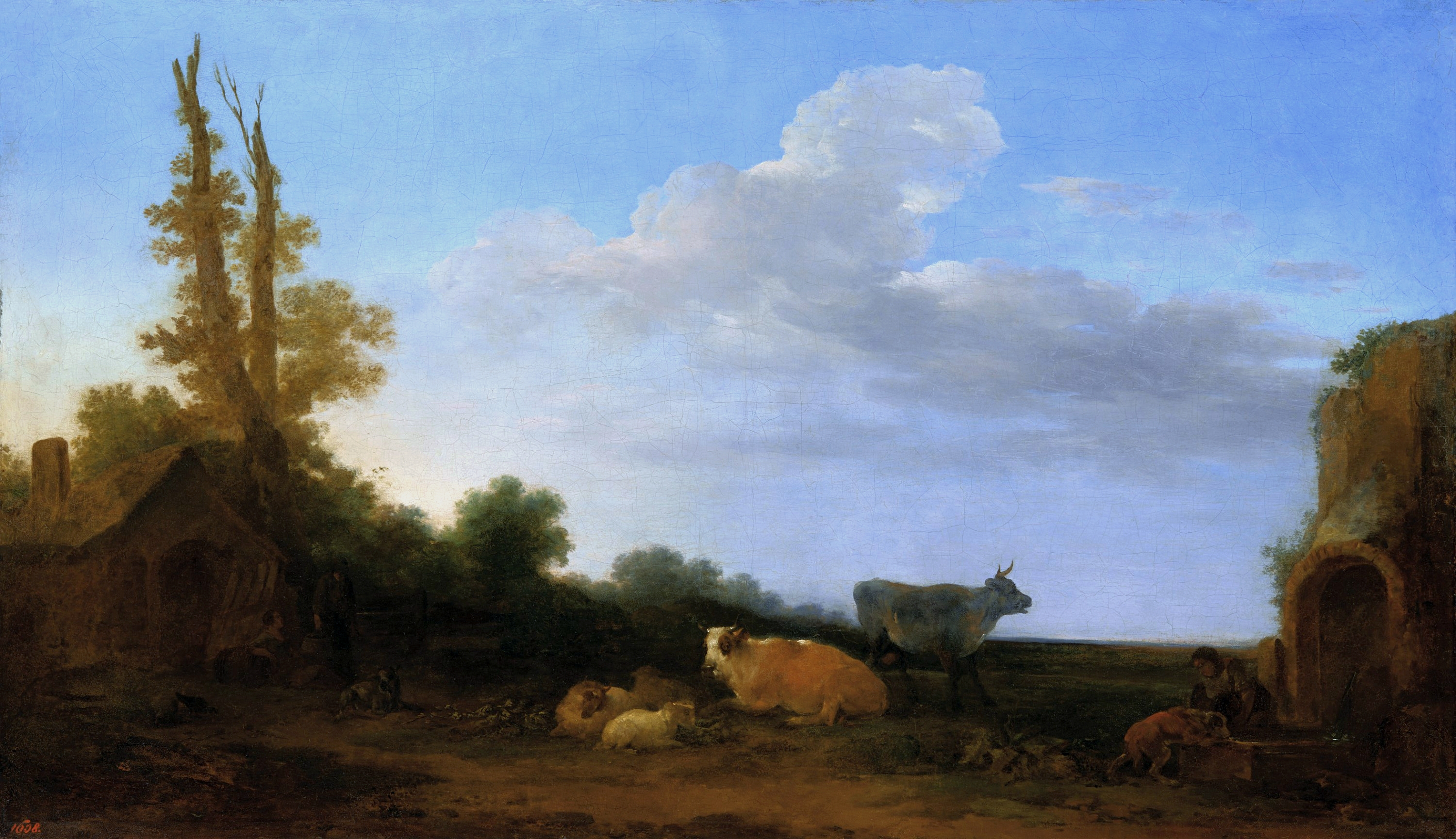
Cattle on pasture, Palace on the Water in Warsaw.

In 1762, he had married Jeanne-Marie Jolivet (1734–1773) a ballerina with the theatre of the Comédie-Italienne who was known as "Mademoiselle d'Alancour". Her professional connections also supplied him with many clients. In 1775, two years after her death, he married the recently widowed Jeanne Cathérine Delachaux (1748–1818). The marriage turned out to be a disaster, so he abandoned her in 1783, aided and abetted by Giacomo. He took refuge in Vienna, under the protection of Prince Charles Joseph de Ligne, who introduced him to Chancellor Kaunitz. It appears that Francesco was almost as extroverted and entertaining as his brother Giacomo, so he quickly became popular at the Viennese Court.

In addition to his paintings, he produced designs for tapestries and upholstery which proved very lucrative. From 1770 to 1787, the Royal Beauvais Manufactory used more than seventy of his patterns. He also produced a number of etchings including Tambour russe à cheval, Les trois Cuirassiers, Le Drapeau, Choc de cavalerie, L’Ane et le Drapeau, and Le Dîner du peintre Casanova.

Despite his success and his many aristocratic clients, he squandered his money, was perpetually in debt, and died in poverty at his home near Mödling. The year is generally given as 1803, although some sources have 1805 or 1807.

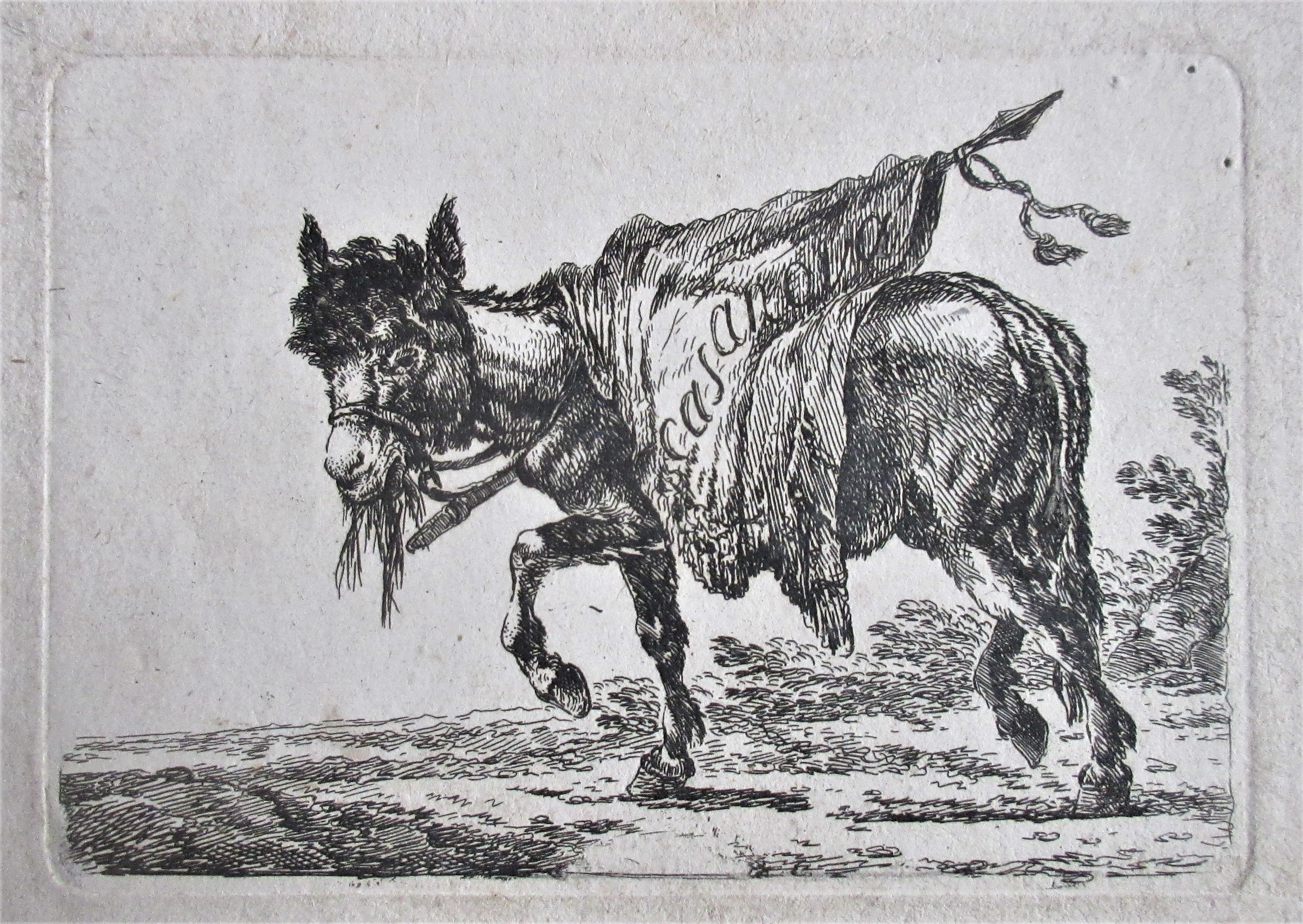
Francesco Casanova, The Ass and the Flag. Etching, 12.5 x 16.7 cm.
