= Zanetta Farussi =

Italian comedic actress (1707–1776)

Zanetta Farussi (27 August 1707 – 29 November 1776), known as La Buranella ("the woman of Burano"), was an Italian comedic actress. Her eldest son was the famous adventurer Giacomo Casanova.

== Biography ==
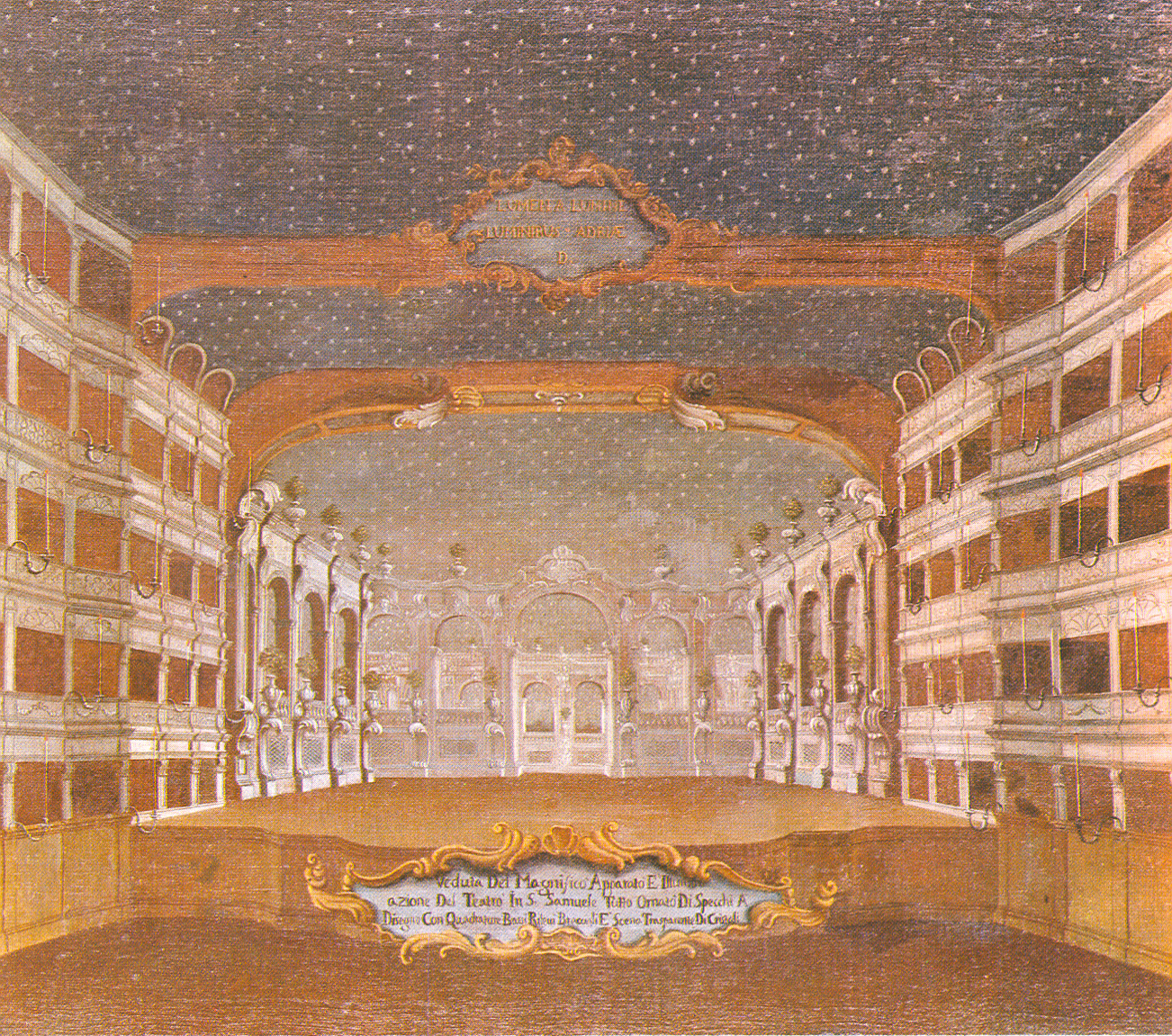
Interior of the Teatro San Samuele, painted c. 1750

Born Maria Giovanna Farussi, her father, Girolamo, was a shoemaker. In 1724, at the age of seventeen, she married the actor, Gaetano Casanova, ten years her senior, who had just returned to Venice after several years with a touring theatrical troupe to take a position at the Teatro San Samuele. The marriage was strongly opposed by her parents, because they considered acting to be a disreputable activity. Her father Girolamo died shortly after, from grief according to his grandson Giacomo, and her mother, Marcia, was reconciled only when Gaetano promised that he would not allow Zanetta to become an actress.

This promise was soon broken when she began an apprenticeship at Gaetano's theater. While she was there, Giacomo was born and (according to Giacomo's memoirs) Gaetano suspected that Michele Grimani (1697–1775), the theater's proprietor, was actually the father. The following year, they accepted a theatrical engagement in London. It was there they had their second son, Francesco, who became a well-known painter. It was rumored that his father was actually the Prince of Wales (who shortly after became King George II); whether for scurrilous motives or publicity is unclear.

They returned to Venice in 1728 and eventually had four more children; Giovanni, who also became a painter, Faustina Maddalena (1731–1736), Maria Maddalena (1732–1800) and Gaetano Alvise (1734–1783), who became a priest; born two months after his father died of an infected abscess in his ear. The Grimani family, possibly remembering the suspicions surrounding Giacomo's birth, promised to look after Zanetta and her children.

In 1734, she met Carlo Goldoni in Verona and he wrote a short comedy for her, called La Pupilla (The Female Ward); inspired by the jealous infatuation she had aroused in Giuseppe Imer (1700–1758), a famous actor and major theatrical impresario. It was presented as an interlude with his tragicomedy, Belisario. The following year, she accepted an engagement in Saint Petersburg, but it was unsuccessful as few people in Russia knew Italian at that time.

In 1737, she signed a long-term contract with the Electorate of Saxony to appear in Italian comedies. She débuted in Pilnitz in 1738, on the occasion of the proxy wedding of Crown Princess Maria Amalia. In 1748, she visited Warsaw, where she presented two short theatrical pieces she had written herself. In 1756, following the start of the Seven Years' War, the Saxon Court suspended the activities of her Italian comedy troupe. Everyone retired and received an annual pension of 400 Thalers.

During the war, she sought refuge in Prague. As soon as it was safe, she returned to Dresden and remained there for the rest of her life. Later, she was joined by her son Giovanni, who taught at the Academy of Fine Arts, and her daughter, Maria Maddalena, who married the Court Organist, Peter August (1726–1787).

== Sources ==
- Francesco Saverio Bartoli, Notizie Istoriche de' comici italiani che fiorirono intorno all'anno MDC fino ai giorni presenti, Padova, Conzatti, 1782, 2 vols. (vol 1, pg. 160).
- Giacomo Casanova Storia della mia vita
  - Edizione a cura di Carlo Cordie, illustrata da Bernardino Palazzi - Edizioni Casini - Roma, 1961, pp. 15–16.
  - Edizione a cura di Piero Chiara e Federico Roncoroni edita dalla Arnoldo Mondadori Editore nel 1983 nella serie I Meridiani, pp. 20–21. Ultima edizione: Milano, Mondadori "I Meridiani", 2001.
  - (Testo originale in francese) Jacques Casanova de Seingalt - Histoire de ma vie. Texte intégral du manuscrit original, suivi de textes inédits. Édition présentée et établie par Francis Lacassin; ISBN 2-221-06520-4. Editore Robert Laffont, 1993. Si tratta dell'edizione in 12 volumi (3 tomi) del manoscritto originale in francese. Da considerare, allo stato (2010), l'edizione critica di riferimento.
- Fr. August Freiherr ô Byrn, Giovanna Casanova und Die Comici Italiani am polnisch-sächsischen Hofe, in Neues Archiv für sächsische Geschichte und Alterthumskunde, 1880.
- Gillian Rees, The italian comedy in London, 1726–1727 with Zanetta Casanova, in L'intermédiaire des Casanovistes, Genève, Année XIII, 1996, pp. 25–32.
- Helmut Watzlawick, Le vrais débuts d'une actrice in L'intermédiare des casanovistes, Genève, Année XX, 2003, pp. 49–53.
