= Fellini: I'm a Born Liar =

- Directed by: Damian Pettigrew
- Written by: Damian Pettigrew
- Produced by: Olivier Gal, ARTE, Eurimages, Scottish Screen, FilmFour
- Starring: Federico Fellini, Roberto Benigni, Terence Stamp, Donald Sutherland, Italo Calvino, Daniel Toscan du Plantier, Dante Ferretti, Rinaldo Geleng, Tullio Pinelli, Giuseppe Rotunno, Luigi "Titta" Benzi
- Cinematography: Paco Wiser
- Edited by: Florence Ricard
- Music by: Nino Rota; Luis Bacalov
- Distributed by: MK2 International
- Release date: 15 March 2002
- Running time: 105 minutes
- Country: France
- Languages: Italian; English; French
- Budget: US$1million (Note: Phillipa Hawker reporting for The Age writes: "For the 10th anniversary of the director's death, [Pettigrew] was able to make the film that he wanted, with a $US1 million ($A1.45 million) budget, of which $US850,000 ($A1.2 million) went on film rights." Retrieved 2013-02-16.)

Fellini: I'm a Born Liar (French: Fellini, je suis un grand menteur) is a 2002 French documentary film written and directed by Damian Pettigrew. Based on Federico Fellini's last confessions (Note: Fellini biographer Tullio Kezich described the film as the maestro's "spiritual testament" in his forward to I'm a Born Liar: A Fellini Lexicon In Fellini: His Life and Work (New York: Faber and Faber, 2006), Kezich also notes that the interviews are "the maestro's last long intimate discussion.") filmed by Pettigrew in Rome in 1991 and 1992 (Fellini died in 1993), the film eschews straightforward biography to highlight the Italian director's unorthodox working methods, conscience, and philosophy.

A masterclass in cinema aesthetics, (Note: The New York Times film critic A. O. Scott noted that the film was "not a biography but a thrilling masterclass in cinema aesthetics.") the feature documentary uses excerpts and behind-the-scenes from 8½, Juliet of the Spirits, Histoires extraordinaires, Fellini Satyricon, Amarcord, Fellini's Casanova, And the Ship Sails On, and City of Women. Also interviewed are Roberto Benigni (La voce della luna), Terence Stamp (Histoires extraordinaires), and Donald Sutherland (Casanova), among other notable Fellini collaborators.

The film was nominated for Best Documentary at the European Film Awards, Europe's equivalent of the Oscars.

== Synopsis ==
Fellini: "Lies are fascinating for what they reveal about the liar."

A camera tracks crosswise alongside a wide, brightly appointed beach, in what appears to be the dead of winter. No bathers are in sight, only a rolling parade of empty cabanas, with a tranquil blue seascape in the distance beyond. The wistful, melancholy music of Nino Rota lends these vistas a dreamy familiarity. We then jump from color to luminous black & white, and a quick glimpse of Federico Fellini's 1963 masterpiece, 8½, in which the monumentally buxom harlot, La Saraghina, is preparing to perform her rumba on the beach for a flock of fugitive schoolboys. It's the very same beach we were just staring at, but magically denuded of 40 years of succeeding development, and made mythic through the eyes of a master.

From this point of departure, Pettigrew juxtaposes archival footage and fresh interviews with Fellini's collaborators, interspersed with classic clips and the fruits of his own present-day visits to the haunting locales where I Vitelloni (1953), Nights of Cabiria (1957), La Dolce Vita (1960), Fellini Satyricon (1969) and other cinematic wonders first came to life. The goal is to fuse these ingredients thematically, to a degree that may better illuminate Fellini's conscience and philosophies. "I am a born liar," the maestro tells us. "For me, the things that are the most real are the ones I invented." In one way or another, Fellini's habit of honestly admitting falsehood is presented, and tested, as the key to his art, and even his spirituality.

Some of the contradictions in Fellini's accounts of himself are just plain funny. "I adore actors", he says. Cut to Donald Sutherland, star of Fellini's Casanova (1976), who quietly seethes that "in his relations with actors, Federico was dreadful, a martinet, a tyrant". Yet Sutherland is close to a smile as he recalls and then offers an insight that deepens the film's argument: "Fellini is constantly threatened by his own superficiality, and is constantly running away from it, in the same sense as Orson Welles. Orson Welles created a lie about himself that was in fact the truth, but he knew that it was a lie he'd created – and once everybody believed it, he found it insupportable."

As the film moves through its final third, the director's early manhood and lifelong collaboration with his actress wife, Giulietta Masina, are evoked through a combination of interviews (particularly with Fellini's boyhood chum Titta Benzi) and clips from 8½ and Juliet of the Spirits. (Note: F. X. Feeney observes that "scenes of boyhood lust, grownup sexual mischief and the intimate, truthfully observed emotional life of a longtime married couple reoccur with a passionate regularity in Fellini's films". Quoted in press notes released by First Look Media in 2003.) We tour the stagier sets and sample the less formally scripted scenes which characterize Fellini's later work. These scenes are balanced against the filmmaker's own latter-day musings in such a way that, even if one tends to resist Fellini's later films, one is better able to see and understand them on his terms as part of an inevitable, continuous growth on his part. "Faking things, constantly faking!" says Fellini as we observe in detail his skillfully crafted, openly false, studio-built seascapes.

The film ends full circle at the seascape where it began except that, now, the remnant of an abandoned camera-track is aimed straight into the sea. On the ambiguity of this final image, critic F. X. Feeney wrote: "Is this substitution of a real sea for the imaginary ones we've been sailing for the past hour and forty minutes a critique, a refutation of Fellini's beloved fakery? Or is it a validation – an invitation to enter the reality at which those fancies were ultimately aimed? In keeping with the maestro's elusive art, the image is a deliberate paradox."

== Production and financing ==
Fellini during the 1992 film shoot in Via Margutta, Rome.

In the summer of 1983, Pettigrew was planning a documentary about novelist Italo Calvino. But when the two met at the novelist's Rome apartment, "We sat around talking about 8½ when we ought to have been discussing Calvino", explained Pettigrew to Newsweek International correspondent Michael J. Agovino. Fellini became such a ready topic whenever the two men relaxed from their more formal interview that after a few days, Calvino told the young filmmaker he had arranged a "little surprise" for him – lunch at Cinecittà cooked by Fellini. "So there he was chopping the garlic", recalled Pettigrew. "The meal was spaghetti aglio e olio, al dente with a sprinkle of black pepper." Appropriately enough, the colloquy between the two Italian fabulists centered entirely on food. "Calvino knew how to steer the conversation. We talked a great deal about French and Italian cheeses – a subject dear to both of them; Calvino had spent many years in Paris and could compare gorgonzola and camembert with expertise." When Fellini pressed the Canadian filmmaker for word of his nation's cuisine, the most unusual he could come up with was the national snack, maple syrup served on snow. "Fellini looked at me in stupefaction. 'Thees is not possible,' he said. 'It is food for mooses and beears.'" Calvino rescued Pettigrew by repeating a thematic connection the latter had made between Elias Canetti's book Crowds and Power and Fellini's political parable, Prova d'orchestra (1979). Fellini was duly surprised, admitting to Pettigrew that Canetti's work had indeed been a conscious influence.

Pettigrew then turned the conversation to film. They were dining in Fellini's private office beside the soundstages at Cinecittà where he was finishing And the Ship Sails On (1983), a joyful production compared to the storms that had attended some of his previous pictures. Talk hinged on Fellini's now total commitment to using soundstages, for exteriors as well as interiors. Pettigrew raised the issue of landscape as a means of revealing a character's inner nature, and this struck a deep, sympathetic chord in both Calvino and Fellini. They each recalled favorite film-moments in which landscape and character merged, speaking particularly of Rossellini's Stromboli, but circling (guided by Calvino) around the beauty and melancholy of the natural landscapes in Fellini's early work.

When Pettigrew brought up the barren rocky hillsides where Augusto (Broderick Crawford) is left to die at the end of Il bidone, Fellini named the place without batting an eye. "Monte Marino, 15 kilometers south of Rome." Intrigued that the maestro's memory was so exact, Pettigrew asked about La Strada. "Bagnoregio, Ovindoli, Ostia", replied Fellini. And 8½ ? "Ostia and Tivoli, the Palais del Drago in Filicciano, 90 kilometers north of Rome. The provincial train station was shot in a train washing shed in the via Prenestina near Porto Maggiore." "What about decor?" Pettigrew wondered. "The hotel lobby and staircase in 8½, for example." "Based on the Plaza Hotel in Rome," Fellini explained, "except that I built a larger staircase and added a second lion. I had the elevator doors copied down to the last detail at great expense. The spa is a combination of the Chianciano and Montecatini spas in Tuscany."

Not until 2001 could Pettigrew assemble a film crew to make the journey across Italy but it was apparently this defining moment over lunch, mining Fellini's memory for places and taking notes, that I'm a Born Liar was born. "I thought it might be a way of making a unique film on Fellini which would for once lead us outside the Cinecittà studios, shooting 'real' locations, 'real' décor and threading these into the 'false' images of his films. The aim would be a portrait dealing with truth and lies, reality and fiction. I was excited by the possibilities of mixing black & white film with the locations in color. But it was years before I met a producer who shared my enthusiasm. Until Olivier Gal, my French producer, finally secured funding with Arte, FilmFour, TelePiu, Scottish Screen, and Eurimages, all the other potential backers either wanted to cut costs or churn out a quickie TV program for a fast buck, especially just after Fellini died." Los Angeles Times reviewer Kenneth Turan reported that what "is beyond doubt is Pettigrew's devotion to Fellini, whom he first met in 1983 and pursued for a decade to get the extended interviews [...] Then Pettigrew sat on the material for years before he found collaborators willing to finance his vision of how it should be used".

From the beginning, however, Pettigrew made his plans known to Fellini and secured the maestro's agreement to cooperate. This proved to be a necessary final step in his education about a paradoxical subject. "Fellini made a cryptic comment to me about 'opposites' and the Italian mind: 'The typical Italian says yes when he means no and no when he means yes.'" Calvino, overhearing, countered with a Joycean adjustment: "Like Nes and Yo." Much as the elder and younger filmmaker would often write and see each over the next decade, even after Calvino's death in 1985, Fellini kept putting the interviews off, perpetually telling Pettigrew that he would find time the following year. By the summers of 1991 and 1992, "free time" had become inescapable: for the first time in 40 years, Fellini was unemployed. "Ah, Damiano!" he lamented. "My last film, La voce della luna (1990), is a beeg flop. Producers call me no more. So you come to Rome and we become partners in crime." Pettigrew managed to obtain more than 10 hours of footage with a Fellini "supremely present, fully aware that the tapes were perhaps his filmed testament -- or, as he later put it in a letter to me: 'The longest and most detailed conversation ever recorded on my personal vision'".

Although Pettigrew admits challenging Fellini so aggressively during the final 1992 film shoot that he threatened to walk out, (Note: Agovino quotes Pettigrew explaining that "you had to push him. 'Quit f—-ing around. I'm really serious, Federico, for God's sake.' There are times he got p—-ed off and I wondered if he'd continue.") their friendship was such that it became physically painful for him to see the great man grown so depressed. "His health was rapidly declining and producers had written him off as a bad risk. I have photographs of Fellini that would make anyone wince: the expression on his face is that of an artist who knows, against his will, that his life's work is over. His deep melancholy, in fact, pervades the entire film." Even so, there were amusing twists in the conversation. When Pettigrew shared a bit of off-handed, amateur medical diagnosis – that the mass of black hairs protruding from Fellini's ears was a classic sign of arteriosclerosis - the maestro began to treat his provocateur with a superstitious reverence, and cooperated more fully than ever.

In a 2004 radio interview with Australian journalist Julie Rigg, Pettigrew reflected on the following passage from Calvino's last novel, Mr. Palomar, which had inspired Fellini for a rooftop scene with Roberto Benigni in La voce della luna:

The true shape of the city of Rome is in this rise and dip of roofs, of tiles old and new, flat and curved ... TV aerials, straight or crooked, painted or rusting, in the models of successive generations... And domes that lie curved against the sky, in every direction, at every distance, as if to confirm the feminine, Junonic essence of the city... from up here, you have the impression that this is the real crust of the earth, uneven but compact, though furrowed by crevices of unknown depth, cracks or wells or craters, whose edges – seen in perspective – look as if they overlap, like the scales of a pine-cone. What can be concealed, at the bottom? I don't know: life on the surface is so rich and various that I have no urge to enquire further. I believe that it is only when you've come to know the surface of things that you can try to find out what lies beneath. But the surface of things is inexhaustible.

When Calvino originally dictated the text to Pettigrew, both were struck by how much it evoked Fellini, "the mystery man covered in the scales of a pine-cone." Serving as the basis for his question to Donald Sutherland on Fellini's notoriously facetious temperament, the actor read the above text and replied, "Fellini is constantly running away from his own superficiality." Pettigrew recalled that Fellini not only knew the Calvino text by heart, "'he encouraged me to make use of it. It was to be our little homage to Calvino, our way of thanking him. 'After all,' quipped Fellini, 'landscape ees character'".

For the Canadian director, the leap from Calvino (born 1923) to Fellini (born 1920) was a straight line: "Both were from northern Italy. Both began their artistic careers as more or less frustrated neorealists seeking to develop forms that would accommodate their fantastic imaginations. To my question, 'Are novelists liars?' Calvino replied: 'Of course. They tell that piece of truth hidden at the bottom of every lie'. Fellini was delighted: 'I always knew I had a robust reason for being a born liar.'"

== Awards and festivals ==
The film premiered at the 2002 Edinburgh International Film Festival, won the Rockie Award for Best Arts Documentary at the 2002 Banff World Television Festival, (Note: In competition were documentaries produced by PBS, BBC, ARTE, HBO, and NHK.) the Coup de Coeur at the 2002 Marseille Festival of Documentary Film, and was nominated for Best Documentary at the European Film Awards, Europe's equivalent of the Oscars.

Selected in over 40 international festivals including Cannes, Moscow, Amsterdam (IDFA), and Montréal, the film was distributed theatrically in 15 countries and sold to television worldwide. It was honoured at the maestro's 2003 gala retrospective at the Fellini Foundation in Rimini and the Cinémathèque française in Paris. (Note: Based on information provided by the film's world distributor MK2 International (Paris).)

== Critical reception ==
=== Europe ===
In Europe, Born Liar garnered unanimously favorable reviews. (Note: Based on review scores provided by MK2 International, the film's world distributor including those archived at Portrait & Company (Paris), the film's copyright holder.) At its sold out Edinburgh premiere attended by Terence Stamp, Artistic Director Shane Danielson reviewed the film as a "remarkable achievement that illuminates its subject with a rare acuity and precision" while Hannah McGill (Note: One of Scotland's most respected film critics, McGill was Artistic Director of the 2008 Edinburgh Festival.) reported for The Herald (Glasgow) that it was "not to be missed. Composed of interviews with the great Italian director himself, as well as collaborators such as Terence Stamp and Donald Sutherland, this is an expertly judged and beautifully made document. Fellini's eloquent descriptions of his own development and working processes reveal extraordinary insight, not only into film-making, but into art and artists across all disciplinary boundaries". S. F. Said of The Telegraph (London) wrote: "For sheer entertainment value, Fellini: I'm A Born Liar is as good as any fiction. The lengthy, probing interview in which Fellini is sometimes contradictory, sometimes self-deceiving, is always entertaining. This is neatly played off against the recollections of collaborators, including Terence Stamp and Donald Sutherland, which are alternately affectionate and appalled."

In France, it was acclaimed in major magazines and newspapers including Les Inrockuptibles, Le Nouvel observateur, Libération, Le Figaro and Le Monde, the latter describing it as a "fascinating film, porteur d'une grande beauté". Vincent Malausa of Les Cahiers du Cinéma was particularly impressed by the film's structure: "By the extreme rigour of its movement, the film succeeds in illuminating the fundamentals of Fellini's entire œuvre."

=== North America ===
In North America, the film received generally favorable reviews. (Note: Based on review scores posted at Metacritic and Rotten Tomatoes.) On the eve of its U.S. premiere attended by Donald Sutherland at the Film Forum, David Denby's The New Yorker review described the film as "a superb documentary fantasia and an extraordinarily controlled piece of film in its own right. The interviews, recorded in the year before the director's death, are often eloquent – Fellini's long sentences actually take you somewhere – and Pettigrew and his colleagues provide a surrounding texture of film excerpts and freshly shot footage that has the density of one of the Maestro's own movies, without the excess".

Michael Wilmington of the Chicago Tribune felt it was crafted for the happy few but "a must for Fellini lovers... Seeing Fellini again in the flesh and in his films is, as always, a pleasure and a teasing mystery - Fellini: I'm a Born Liar is best watched in conjunction with the films themselves". Although he was "happy to have seen it", Roger Ebert declared the film "lacked specifics" and that as "a biography of Fellini the film is almost worthless but as an insight into his style, the film is priceless". In his review in The New York Times, A. O. Scott explained that Fellini's style was precisely what the film was all about: "The interviews with Fellini and some of his collaborators, the snippets of movies both famous and obscure, the glimpses behind the scenes and the master's own garrulous, charming presence make for a thrilling masterclass in cinema aesthetics, with footnotes compiled by an intelligent and devoted disciple." Reporting for both NPR and the Los Angeles Times, Kenneth Turan argued that "there's a lot to like about Born Liar, starting with that comprehensive interview which reveals Fellini to be an intoxicating conversationalist, articulate, expansive and capable of giving radically different takes on the same subject". Turan concluded that the film was "both completely fascinating and intermittently frustrating; however, as with Fellini's own films, the downside is far outweighed by the pluses".

By being "squarely focused on the nature of Fellini's insatiability", Pulitzer Prize-winner Wesley Morris of The Boston Globe maintained that Born Liar found "the truth behind Fellini's genius". Harper Barnes, longtime editor and cultural critic for the St. Louis Post-Dispatch, praised the film as a "remarkable, intellectually daunting and mind-stirring documentary that deals with philosophical and psychological questions, but always in a Felliniesque way. It tells a story, one that is visually rich and emotionally compelling and charged with one of the great director's favorite concepts – expectation, the sense that something always new and marvelous will come along". Barnes placed it on his Top Ten list of the best films of 2003.

"There should be a separate term for films that are nonfiction but clearly not intended to be objective documentaries", argued Wade Major of Boxoffice Magazine. "For without such a category, it's impossible to do proper justice to Fellini: I'm a Born Liar, probably the best such film ever made." "Few viewers of this fascinating documentary will remain untouched", wrote prominent Fellini expert Peter Bondanella in Cineaste Magazine. "There is no question that Pettigrew's film on Fellini represents the most detailed and lengthy conversation with him ever recorded."

== Soundtrack ==
Nino Rota's themes from La Dolce Vita (1960), 8½ (1963), Amarcord (1973), and Casanova (1976), and various themes from City of Women (1980) composed by Luis Bacalov.

== Theatrical releases ==
- Scotland: 56th Edinburgh International Film Festival premiere (24 August 2002) (Note: Countries and dates based on information provided by the film's copyright holder Portrait & Company (Paris).)
- France: Heliotrope Films in tandem with MK2 International for world sales (May 7, 2003)
- United States: First Look International (April 2, 2003)
- Canada: Crystal Films (Québec, April 4, 2003) TVA Films (nationwide, 2004)
- Italy: Mikado (June 20, 2003)
- Spain: Cooper Films (June 22, 2003)
- Netherlands (September 10, 2003)
- Denmark (August 15, 2003)
- Japan: Toho Koshinsha Films (November 1, 2003)
- Australia: Palace Films (October 15, 2003)
- Brazil: Providence Films (June 20, 2003)
- Bulgaria: Marigold Films (July 12, 2003)
- Sweden: Sveriges Television (2003)
- Russia: Moscow Film Festival (June 26, 2004)
- Switzerland: CAB Productions (2004)
- United Kingdom: Metro Tartan Distribution (2006)
- Portugal: Costa do Castelo Filmes (2006)
- Ukraine: Klarmina (2006)

== DVD and book releases ==
The feature documentary is available in the following DVD editions:

- North America – First Look Pictures (in Region 1 with cover art by Jean Giraud)
- Italy – Cecchi Gori Editoria (in Region 2)
- Japan: Toho Koshinsha Films (in Region 2)
- Brazil: Providence Films (in Region 2)
- Bulgaria: Marigold Films (in Region 2)
- Ukraine: Klarmina (in Region 2)
- Portugal – Costa do Castelo Filmes (in Region 2)
- France and Switzerland – Les Films de Ma Vie (in Region 2) and Opening (in Region 2).

The Opening DVD is an 8-disc anamorphically enhanced international Collectors Edition that includes the theatrical version together with six films by Federico Fellini, and 105' of bonus material featuring the animated film, Il lungo viaggio di Fellini (directed by Khrajnovski, written by Tonino Guerra), a 20' documentary by Pettigrew that takes the viewer from Rimini across the Apennine Mountains to Rome and the Tyrrhenian Sea, interviews with Roland Topor and Donald Sutherland, artwork by Jean Giraud, and rare footage of the maestro drawing a caricature of himself.

Designed as a companion to the documentary (which, in contrast, uses a single photo of Fellini as a baby), the book I'm a Born Liar: A Fellini Lexicon has 124 film stills of Fellini at work and many unpublished photographs restored by the Cineteca di Bologna (Italy).

== Sources ==
=== DVD ===
- Pettigrew, Damian. Fellini: I'm a Born Liar. Produced by Olivier Gal. Edited by Florence Ricard. Los Angeles: First Look Home Entertainment, 2003
- —. Fellini, je suis un grand menteur. Paris: Les Films de ma vie, 2006.

==== Secondary sources ====
- Calvino, Italo. Uno scrittore pomeridiano: Intervista sull'arte della narrativa a cura di William Weaver e Damian Pettigrew con un ricordo di Pietro Citati. Rome: minimum fax, 2003
- Danielson, Shane and Ginette Atkinson (ed). 56th Edinburgh International Film Festival Catalogue. Edinburgh: Edfilmfest, 2002
- Kezich, Tullio. Fellini: His Life and Work. New York: Faber and Faber, 2006

== See also ==
- Art film
