= Damian Pettigrew =

Canadian filmmaker and multimedia artist

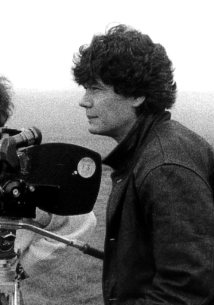
- Born: Damian (Damien) Pettigrew; Québec, Canada
- Occupations: filmmaker, screenwriter, author
- Years active: 1982–present
- Height: 188 cm (6 ft 2 in)
- Awards: UNESCO Grand Prize - Best Documentary; 1997 Balthus Through the Looking Glass; Lausanne IFAF Prize - Best Photography; 1997 Balthus Through the Looking Glass; Prix Arte Nomination - Best Documentary; 2003 Fellini: I'm a Born Liar; Marseille IFF Award - Coup de Coeur; 2003 Fellini: I'm a Born Liar; Banff World Television Festival Rockie Award - Best Arts Documentary; 2003 Fellini: I'm a Born Liar

Damian (also Damien) Pettigrew (1963) is a Canadian filmmaker, screenwriter, producer, author, and multimedia artist, best known for his cinematic portraits of Balthus, Carolyn Carlson, Federico Fellini, and Jean Giraud.

Released theatrically in fifteen countries, his film Fellini: I'm a Born Liar won the Rockie Award for Best Documentary at the Banff World Television Festival and was nominated for the Prix Arte at the European Film Awards, Europe's equivalent of the Oscars.

== Biography ==
Pettigrew's mother was a child psychologist. His father, Dr. J.F. Pettigrew, was the first Canadian surgeon to diagnose the heart condition known as aortic coarctation in 1953.

After reading English, French and Italian Literature at the universities of Bishop's, Oxford, and Glasgow (where he discovered the work of Scottish film director Bill Douglas), Pettigrew studied cinema at IDHEC in Paris. At the Cinémathèque Française, he met Brion Gysin and Steve Lacy and began frequenting their artists' circle. If his work is influenced by Gysin's celebrated cut-up technique, the profound and lasting effect on his life was his friendship with Samuel Beckett.

In 1983, Pettigrew launched a remake of Film (film) (1965) starring Klaus Kinski, with Beckett as consultant and Raoul Coutard as cameraman. Kinski’s scheduling, however, proved intractable. Beckett next proposed Jack Lemmon for the role but the project was abandoned when Lemmon explained he was incapable of competing with Buster Keaton (who first played the roles of O and E in 1965). With Beckett and Pettigrew in 1984, the actor David Warrilow initiated Take 2, a tentative sequel to Film, but the project remained unfinished at the playwright's death in 1989. In 1990, Pettigrew settled in Paris to devote himself to filmmaking.

In 1999, he co-founded Portrait et Compagnie with French producer Olivier Gal. He spends a short part of each year on Lake Memphremagog in the Eastern Townships of Quebec.

== Work ==
A recognized authority on Federico Fellini, his portrait of the maestro, Fellini: I'm a Born Liar, won the prestigious Rockie Award at the 2002 Banff World Television Festival, receiving excellent reviews in The New Yorker, The New York Times, Los Angeles Times, Newsweek International, Le Monde, Corriere della Sera, l'Unità, The Herald, The Telegraph (London), and newspapers throughout Europe, Brazil, Australia and Japan. Nominated for Best Documentary at the European Film Awards, Europe's equivalent of the Oscars, the film established his reputation as a director of "extraordinarily controlled" feature documentaries. The interview transcripts were published in 2003 as I'm a Born Liar: A Fellini Lexicon with 125 illustrations and a preface by Fellini biographer Tullio Kezich. The Italian director pays particular homage to Tullio Pinelli, his co-scriptwriter on such classics as I Vitelloni, La Strada, and La Dolce Vita.

Other films include portraits of Eugène Ionesco, Italo Calvino, and Jean Giraud. His Balthus Through the Looking Glass, a study of the controversial French painter, was filmed in Super 16 over a 12-month period in Switzerland, Italy, France and the Moors of England. Esteemed by Guy Davenport, it was honored in a cycle of film classics by Jean Renoir, Marcel Carné, and Jean Vigo at the Museum Ludwig (Cologne, Germany) in September 2007.

In 2010, Pettigrew directed MetaMoebius, a cinematic essay on French graphic designer Moebius aka Jean Giraud for the Fondation Cartier pour l'Art Contemporain and CinéCinéma Classic. His documentary, The Irene Hilda Story, based on the European cabaret tradition during the Second World War as experienced by French stars Irene and Bernard Hilda, Micheline Presle and Henri Salvador, was broadcast in France and Germany by ARTE France that same year.

A mid-career retrospective of his work in film was held at the Centre des Arts d'Enghien-les-Bains from 5 October 2011 to 28 March 2012. His informal discussion with Ingmar Bergman (conducted in the fall of 2003 at Fårö Island) on the Swedish director's affinities with Samuel Beckett's work was published in L’Âge d’or du cinéma européen in 2011.

In 2012, he completed Inside Italo (Lo specchio di Calvino), a feature-length study of Italo Calvino for ARTE France in co-production with Italy’s Ministero per i Beni e le Attività Culturali and the National Film Board of Canada. Starring Italian actor Neri Marcorè and distinguished literary critic Pietro Citati, the docu-fiction uses in-depth conversations filmed at the writer's Rome penthouse a year before his death in 1985 and rare footage from RAI, BBC, and INA (Institut national de l'audiovisuel) television archives. ARTE and SKY ARTE (Italy) broadcast the 52-minute version on 19 December 2012 and 14 October 2013, respectively.

In 2024, Pettigrew completed the first feature-length documentary on Carolyn Carlson, the France-based American dancer and choreographer. Begun in January 2012, the film focuses on the creation of several major works by Carlson including Synchronicity (2012), Dialogue with Rothko (2013) and Woman in a Room with Diana Vishneva, principal dancer with the Mariinsky Ballet and the American Ballet Theatre, and Black Over Red (2017) with Marie-Agnès Gillot, star dancer at the Paris Opéra Ballet. The 55-minute version was first broadcast by Arte France and the ZDF on 14 January 2024.

== In development ==
In development are two feature films: Darkness Visible starring Tim Roth and Eriq Ebouaney, and Beckett, based on the director's experience working with Samuel Beckett.

Fellini on film set (1992)

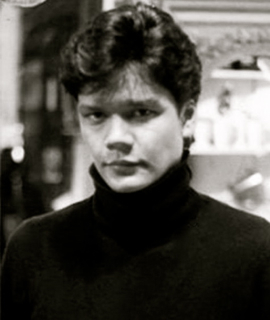
Pettigrew on film set (1992)

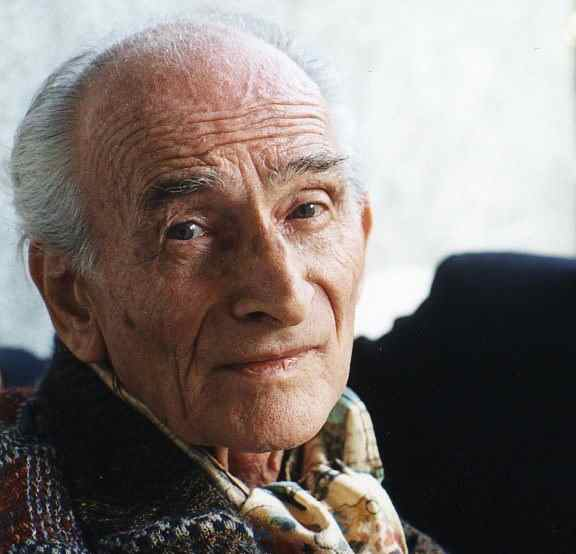
Balthus on film set at the Grand Chalet (1996)

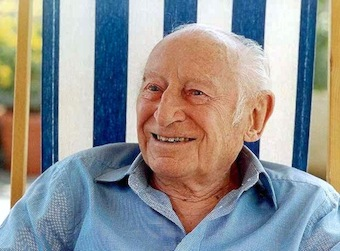
Tullio Pinelli at his home in Rome (2002)

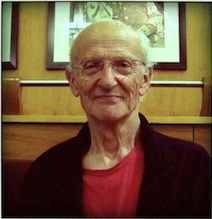
Jean Giraud at La Coupole in Paris (2010)

== Selected filmography ==
=== Writer-Director ===
- Fellini ou l'amour de la vie (1993)
- Mr Gir et Mike S. Blueberry (1999)
- L'histoire d'Irène / The Irene Hilda Story (2009)
- Fellini : 8½ en six mémos / Fellini's 8½ in 6 Memos (2009)
- Ionesco : Autour du Roi se meurt avec Michel Bouquet (2009)
- MetaMoebius : Giraud-Moebius, métamorphoses (2010)
- The Rome Trilogy:
  - Balthus Through the Looking Glass / Balthus de l'autre côté du miroir (1996)
  - Fellini: I'm a Born Liar / Fellini, sono un gran bugiardo / Fellini, je suis un grand menteur (2002)
  - Inside Italo / Lo specchio di Calvino / Dans la peau d'Italo Calvino (2012)
- Carolyn Carlson, Dare to Risk (2024)
- Fellini Politicus (2024)

=== Producer ===
- Ionesco : Conversations autour d'une caméra (Ionesco interviews)
- Fellini: I'm a Born Liar (Fellini interviews)
- Inside Italo (Calvino interviews)
- Allain Leprest
- Jean-Jacques Annaud (Annaud interviews)
- Carolyn Carlson

=== Screenplays ===
- Les Yeux de ma mâitresse (2005 - funded by Centre National de la Cinématographie)
- Inside Italo (2012 - funded by Centre National de la Cinématographie and Ministero per i Beni e le Attività Culturali)
- Darkness Visible (2018)
- The World is a Wildflower (2019)
- Sam and Suzanne (2020)

=== Video art ===
- 40RO (2003)
- 4 Faces 5 Voices (2018)
- Marlène (2021)

== Selected publications ==
This bibliography is focused on the published interviews that were filmed, produced and directed by Pettigrew in collaboration with the following artists:

- Fellini, Federico & Pettigrew, Damian:
  - Fellini, je suis un grand menteur. Paris: L'Arche, 1994 (ISBN 2851813404).
  - Fellini, eu sou um grande mentiroso. Rio de Janeiro: Nova Fronteira, 1995.
  - Fellini, Ich bin ein großer Lügner. Munich: Verlag der Autoren, 1995 (ISBN 3886611566).
  - 'Fellini: Creation and the Artist' in Projections 4. London: Faber and Faber, 1995 (ISBN 0-571-17363-2).
  - 'Fellini et l'entretien avec Damian Pettigrew' in Cahiers Jungiens de Psychanalyse. (Paris, Issue 104, 2002.)
  - Fellini, sono un gran bugiardo. Prefazione di Tullio Kezich. Roma: Elleu, 2003 (ISBN 8874761228).
  - I'm a Born Liar: A Fellini Lexicon. Preface by Tullio Kezich. New York, Harry N. Abrams, Inc., 2003 (ISBN 0-8109-4617-3).
  - Federico Fellini. Sou um grande mentiroso. Uma conversa com Damian Pettigrew. Lisboa: Fim de Século, 2008.
- Calvino, Italo & Pettigrew, Damien:
  - The Paris Review Interviews - The Art of Fiction, No. 130. (Issue 124, Fall 1992).
  - "Sogno e delirio. Il Calvino segreto" in La Repubblica, 10 September 1995.
  - Uno scrittore pomeridiano. Intervista sull'arte della narrativa a cura di William Weaver e Damien Pettigrew con un ricordo di Pietro Citati. Roma: Minimum fax, 2003 (ISBN 8887765863).

=== Essays on cinema ===
- « Ascenseur (les objets felliniens) » in Fellinicittà (ed. J-M. Méjean). Paris: Editions de la Transparence, 2009 (ISBN 978-2-35700-008-7).
- « Trois films, trois sourires : quelques regards sur Bergman » in L’Age d’or du cinéma Européen 1950-1970 (ed. Denitza Bantcheva). Chatou: Editions du Revif, 2011.(ISBN 978-2-35051-046-0).

=== Interviews online ===
- « Les dernières interrogations de Pierre Emmanuel » in Le Monde (7 October 1984) Interview with Pierre Emmanuel
- « Le Méxique et le serpent à plumes » Interview with Jean-Claude Carrière
- "The World Outside the Self" in CV/11, IV, 2 (Spring 1979), 26-30 Interview with Ralph Gustafson

== Awards and festivals ==
Information for this section provided by IMDb and the official site of Fellini: I’m a Born Liar.

UNESCO Grand Prize - Best Documentary

- 1997 for Balthus Through the Looking Glass

Best Photography Prize - Lausanne International Festival of Art Films

- 1997 for Balthus Through the Looking Glass

Official Selection - 8th Marseille International Film Festival (Vue sur les docs)

- 1997 for Balthus Through the Looking Glass

Official Selection - 56th Edinburgh International Film Festival

- 2002 for Fellini: I'm a Born Liar (selected in over 40 international festivals including Edinburgh, Moscou, Amsterdam, Toronto and Montréal)

Nomination Prix Arte for Best Documentary - European Film Awards

- 2002 for Fellini: I’m a Born Liar

Coup de Cœur Award - 13th Marseille International Film Festival (Vue sur les docs)

- 2002 for Fellini: I’m a Born Liar

Rockie Award for Best Arts Documentary - Banff World Television Festival

- 2002 for Fellini: I’m a Born Liar

Homage to Fellini 1993-2003 - Cannes International Film Festival, Cinémathèque Française and Rimini Fellini Foundation

- 2003 for Fellini: I’m a Born Liar

Official Selection - 1st Cairo Panorama of European Film

- 2004 for Fellini: I’m a Born Liar

Official Selection - Toronto Jewish Film Festival (selected in 10 international festivals)

- 2010 for The Irene Hilda Story

Official Selection - 14th Blue Metropolis

- 2012 for Inside Italo

Italo Calvino - 90th Anniversary 1923-2013 - Centro Sperimentale di Cinematografia

- 2013 for Inside Italo

Member, The Society of Multimedia Authors of France (SCAM), The Society of Authors of France (SGDL), and ONE Campaign

== See also ==
- Art film
- Video art
- Eastern Townships
