= La Dolce Vita =

1960 film directed by Federico Fellini

- Italian theatrical release poster
- Directed by: Federico Fellini
- Screenplay by: Federico Fellini; Ennio Flaiano; Tullio Pinelli; Brunello Rondi; Uncredited: Pier Paolo Pasolini
- Story by: Federico Fellini; Ennio Flaiano; Tullio Pinelli
- Produced by: Giuseppe Amato; Angelo Rizzoli
- Starring: Marcello Mastroianni; Anita Ekberg; Anouk Aimée; Yvonne Furneaux; Alain Cuny; Annibale Ninchi; Magali Noël; Lex Barker; Jacques Sernas; Nadia Gray
- Cinematography: Otello Martelli
- Edited by: Leo Catozzo
- Music by: Nino Rota
- Production companies: Riama Film; Pathé Consortium Cinéma; Gray Films
- Distributed by: Cineriz (Italy); Pathé Consortium Cinéma (France)
- Release dates: 5 February 1960 (Italy); 11 May 1960 (France)
- Running time: 174 minutes
- Countries: Italy; France
- Language: Italian
- Box office: $19.5 million (US); 16.6 million tickets (Italy/France)

La Dolce Vita (Italian: [la ˈdoltʃe ˈviːta]; Italian for 'the sweet life' or 'the good life') is a 1960 satirical comedy-drama film directed by Federico Fellini and written by Fellini, Ennio Flaiano, Tullio Pinelli, and Brunello Rondi. The film stars Marcello Mastroianni as Marcello Rubini, a tabloid journalist who, over seven days and nights, journeys through the "sweet life" of Rome in a fruitless search for love and happiness. The screenplay can be divided into a prologue, seven major episodes interrupted by an intermezzo, and an epilogue, according to the most common interpretation.

Released in Italy on 5 February 1960, La Dolce Vita was both a critical success and worldwide commercial hit, despite censorship in some regions. It won the Palme d'Or at the 1960 Cannes Film Festival and the Academy Award for Best Costumes. It was nominated for three more Oscars, including Best Director for Federico Fellini, and Best Original Screenplay. Its success proved a watershed moment for Italian cinema and European cinema-at-large, and it has come to be regarded as a masterpiece of Italian cinema, as well as one of the greatest films ever made.

The character of Paparazzo, the news photographer (portrayed by Walter Santesso) is the origin of the word paparazzi, used in many languages to describe intrusive photographers. In 2008, the film was included on the Italian Ministry of Cultural Heritage's 100 Italian films to be saved, a list of 100 films that "have changed the collective memory of the country between 1942 and 1978".

== Plot ==
=== Prologue ===
1st Day Sequence: A helicopter transports a statue of Christ over an ancient Roman aqueduct outside Rome while a second, Marcello Rubini's news helicopter, follows it into the city. The news helicopter is momentarily sidetracked by a group of bikini-clad women sunbathing on the rooftop of a high-rise apartment building. Hovering above, Marcello uses gestures to elicit phone numbers from them but fails in his attempt. He then shrugs and continues following the statue to Saint Peter's Square.

=== Episode 1 ===
1st Night Sequence: Marcello meets Maddalena by chance in an exclusive nightclub. A beautiful and wealthy heiress, Maddalena is tired of Rome, while Marcello finds it suits him. They have sex in the bedroom of a sex worker whom they had given a ride home in Maddalena's Cadillac.

1st Dawn Sequence: Marcello returns to his apartment to find that his fiancée, Emma, has overdosed. On the way to the hospital, he declares his everlasting love to her and again as she lies in a semiconscious state in the emergency room. While waiting frantically for her recovery, however, he tries to make a phone call to Maddalena.

=== Episode 2 ===
2nd Day Sequence: That day, he goes on assignment for the arrival of Sylvia, a famous Swedish-American actress, at Ciampino airport where she is met by a horde of news reporters.

During Sylvia's press conference, Marcello calls home to ensure Emma has taken her medication while reassuring her that he is not alone with Sylvia. After the film star confidently replies to the barrage of journalists' questions, her boyfriend Robert enters the room late and drunk. Marcello casually recommends to Sylvia's producer that she be taken on a tour of St Peter's.

Inside St Peter's dome, a news reporter complains that Sylvia is "an elevator" because none of them can match her energetic climb up the numerous flights of stairs. Inspired, Marcello maneuvers forward to be alone with her when they finally reach the balcony overlooking St. Peter's Square. They almost share a kiss.

2nd Night Sequence: That evening, the infatuated Marcello dances with Sylvia in the Baths of Caracalla. Sylvia's natural sensuality triggers raucous partying while Robert, her bored fiancé, draws caricatures and reads a newspaper. His humiliating remark to her causes Sylvia to leave the group, eagerly followed by Marcello and his paparazzi colleagues. Finding themselves alone, Marcello and Sylvia spend the rest of the evening in the alleys of Rome, where they wade into the Trevi Fountain.

2nd Dawn Sequence: Like a magic spell that has suddenly been broken, dawn arrives at the very moment Sylvia playfully "anoints" Marcello's head with fountain water. They drive back to Sylvia's hotel to find an enraged Robert waiting for her in his car. Robert slaps Sylvia, orders her to go to bed, and then assaults Marcello, who takes it in stride.

=== Episode 3 ===
3rd Day Sequence: Marcello meets Steiner, his distinguished intellectual friend, inside a church. Steiner shows off his book of Sanskrit grammar. The two go up to play the organ, offering up a jazz piece for the watching priest before playing Bach.

=== Episode 4 ===
3rd Day Sequence: Late afternoon, Marcello, his photographer friend Paparazzo, and Emma drive to the outskirts of Rome to cover the story of the purported sighting of the Madonna by two children. Although the Catholic Church is officially skeptical, a huge crowd of devotees and reporters gathers at the site.

3rd Night Sequence: That night, the event is broadcast over Italian radio and television. Emma prays to the Virgin Mary to be given sole possession of Marcello's heart. Blindly following the two children from corner to corner in a downpour, the crowd tears a small tree apart for its branches and leaves said to have sheltered the Madonna.

3rd Dawn Sequence: The gathering ends at dawn with the crowd mourning a sick child, a pilgrim brought by his mother to be healed, but trampled to death in the melee.

=== Episode 3b ===
4th Night Sequence: One evening, Marcello and Emma attend a gathering at Steiner's luxurious home, where they are introduced to a group of intellectuals who recite poetry, strum the guitar, offer philosophical ideas, and listen to sounds of nature recorded on tape. The British poet Iris Tree, whose poetry Marcello has read and admired, recommends that Marcello avoid the "prisons" of commitment: "Stay free, available, like me. Never get married. Never choose. Even in love, it's better to be chosen." Emma appears enchanted with Steiner's home and children, telling Marcello that one day he will have a home like Steiner's, but he turns away moodily.

Outside on the terrace, Marcello confesses to Steiner his admiration for all he stands for, but Steiner admits he is torn between the security that a materialistic life affords and his longing for a more spiritual albeit insecure way of life. Steiner philosophizes about the need for love in the world and fears what his children may grow up to face one day.

=== Intermezzo ===
5th Day Sequence: Marcello spends the afternoon working on his novel at a seaside restaurant, where he meets Paola, a young waitress from Perugia playing Perez Prado's cha-cha "Patricia" on the jukebox and then humming its tune. He asks her if she has a boyfriend, then describes her as an angel in Umbrian paintings.

=== Episode 5 ===
5th Night Sequence: Marcello meets his father visiting Rome on the Via Veneto. With Paparazzo, they go to the "Cha-Cha" Club, where Marcello introduces his father to Fanny, a beautiful dancer and one of his past girlfriends (he had promised to get her picture in the paper but failed to do it). Fanny takes a liking to his father. Marcello tells Paparazzo that as a child he had never seen much of his father, who would spend weeks away from home. Fanny invites Marcello's father back to her flat, and two other dancers invite the two younger men to go with them. Marcello leaves the others when they get to the dancers' neighborhood. Fanny comes out of her house, upset that Marcello's father has become ill.

5th Dawn Sequence: Marcello's father has suffered what seems to be a mild heart attack. Marcello wants him to stay with him in Rome so they can get to know each other, but his father, weakened, wants to go home and gets in a taxi to catch the first train to Cesena. He leaves Marcello forlorn, on the street, watching the taxi leave.

=== Episode 6 ===
6th Night Sequence: Marcello, Nico, and other friends meet on the Via Veneto and are driven to a castle owned by aristocrats at Bassano di Sutri outside Rome. There is already a party long in progress, and the party-goers are bleary-eyed and intoxicated. By chance, Marcello meets Maddalena again. The two of them explore a suite of ruins annexed to the castle. Maddalena seats Marcello in a vast room and then closets herself in another room connected by an echo chamber. As a disembodied voice, Maddalena asks him to marry her; Marcello professes his love for her, avoiding answering her proposal. Another man kisses and embraces Maddalena, who loses interest in Marcello. He rejoins the group, and eventually spends the night with Jane, a British artist and heiress.

6th Dawn Sequence: Burnt out and bleary-eyed, the group returns at dawn to the main section of the castle, to be met by the matriarch of the castle, who is on her way to mass, accompanied by priests in a procession.

=== Episode 3c ===
7th Night Sequence: Marcello and Emma are alone in his sports car on an isolated road. Emma continues an argument by professing her love and tries to get out of the car; Marcello pleads with her not to get out. Emma says that Marcello will never find another woman who loves him the way she does. Marcello becomes enraged, telling her that he cannot live with her smothering, maternal love. He now wants her to get out of the car, but she refuses. With some violence (a bite from her and a slap from him), he throws her out of the car and drives off, leaving her alone on a deserted road at night.

7th Dawn Sequence: Emma hears Marcello's car returning as she holds wildflowers picked from the roadside. She gets into the car with neither of them saying a word.

Later, they are asleep in bed, tenderly intertwined, when Marcello receives a phone call. He rushes to the Steiners' apartment and learns that Steiner has killed his two children and himself. Marcello is interrogated by the police and afterwards volunteers to accompany an officer on his way to meet Steiner's wife.

8th Day Sequence: After waiting at the bus stop, Marcello identifies Steiner's wife when she arrives. He and the officer escort her to the car to break the terrible news, while the paparazzi swarm around them snapping pictures.

=== Episode 7 ===
8th Night Sequence: An unspecified amount of time later, an older Marcello—now with gray in his hair—has quit journalism and abandoned his attempt at writing a book to become a publicist. He and a group of partygoers break into a Fregene beach house owned by Riccardo, a friend of Marcello's. Many of the men are homosexual. To celebrate her recent divorce from Riccardo, Nadia performs a striptease to Perez Prado's cha-cha "Patricia". Riccardo shows up at the house and tells the partiers to leave. The drunken Marcello attempts to provoke the other partygoers into an orgy. However, their inebriation causes the party to descend into mayhem, with Marcello riding a young woman crawling on her hands and knees and throwing pillow feathers around the room.

=== Epilogue ===
8th Dawn Sequence: The party proceeds to the beach at dawn where they find a modern-day leviathan, a bloated, sea ray-like creature, caught in the fishermen's nets. (Note: The fish is not specified in the film script nor identified by critics or biographers. Set designer Piero Gherardi described his creation as "a kind of huge beast with blobs of plaster all over it like veal tripe. For eyes I gave it convex enlarging lenses".) In his stupor, Marcello comments on how its eyes stare even in death.

9th Day Sequence: Paola, the adolescent waitress from the seaside restaurant in Fregene, calls to Marcello from across an estuary, but the words they exchange are lost on the wind, drowned out by the crashing waves. He signals his inability to understand what she is saying or interpret her gestures. He shrugs and returns to the partygoers; one of the women joins him and they hold hands as they walk away from the beach. In a long final close-up, Paola waves to Marcello and then stands watching him with an enigmatic smile.

== Cast ==
- Marcello Mastroianni as Marcello Rubini
- Anita Ekberg as Sylvia Rank
- Anouk Aimée as Maddalena
- Yvonne Furneaux as Emma
- Lex Barker as Robert
- Magali Noël as Fanny
- Alain Cuny as Enrico Steiner
- Nadia Gray as Nadia
- Jacques Sernas as Divo
- Laura Betti as Laura
- Walter Santesso as Paparazzo
- Valeria Ciangottini as Paola
- Riccardo Garrone as Riccardo
- Annibale Ninchi as Marcello's father
- Ida Galli as Debutante of the Year
- Audrey McDonald as Jane
- Alain Dijon as Frankie Stout
- Enzo Cerusico as News Photographer
- Giò Stajano as Pierone
- Giulio Questi as Don Giulio Mascalchi
- Sondra Lee as Ballerina
- Dominot as Drag Queen
- Ferdinand Guillaume as Pagliaccio
- Oretta Fiume as Lisa
- Harriet White Medin as Edna
- John Francis Lane as John
- Umberto Orsini as man in shades
- Archie Savage as street dancer
- Nico as herself
- Adriano Celentano as himself
- Iris Tree as herself
- Winie Vagliani as singer at Steiner's party
- Desmond O'Grady as himself

== Production ==
=== Costumes ===
In various interviews, Fellini said that the film's inspiration was the fashionable ladies' sack dress, because of what the dress could hide beneath it. Brunello Rondi, Fellini's co-screenwriter and long-time collaborator, confirmed this view explaining that "the fashion of women's sack dresses which possessed that sense of luxurious butterflying out around a body that might be physically beautiful but not morally so; these sack dresses struck Fellini because they rendered a woman very gorgeous who could, instead, be a skeleton of squalor and solitude inside."

=== Writing ===
Credit for the creation of Steiner, the intellectual who kills himself after shooting his two children, goes to co-screenwriter Tullio Pinelli. Having gone to school with Italian novelist Cesare Pavese, Pinelli had closely followed the writer's career and felt that his over-intellectualism had become emotionally sterile, leading to his suicide in a Turin hotel in 1950. This idea of a "burnt-out existence" is carried over to Steiner in the party episode where the sounds of nature are not to be experienced first-hand by himself and his guests but in the virtual world of tape recordings.

The "false miracle" alludes to the 1958 investigation discounting the claims of two children to have been visited by the Madonna in a farm at Maratta Alta, near Terni. The "dead sea monster" alludes to the Montesi affair, in which the dead body of 21 year old Wilma Montesi was discovered on a beach in April 1953.

=== Casting ===
La Dolce Vita marks the first collaboration between Fellini and Mastroianni. On November 4, 1977 in an interview on The Dick Cavett Show, Mastroianni recalled their first encounter. According to Mastroianni, Fellini told him that the producer wanted Paul Newman for the lead role, but that Fellini considered Newman too beautiful, while Mastroianni was "the face of normal." Mastroianni, somewhat embarrassed, requested to read the script before agreeing to the role:

I said, "Well, ok, I would like to read the script please." He [Fellini] said, "Why not? Ennio, come with the script"...I opened the script and there was nothing written...blank pages...then I saw a sketch of the sea and a man swimming with an enormous...[Mastroianni indicates a large phallus]...and around his element there was a dance of mermaids. I became green, red, yellow. I said, "Well, it seems very interesting...Where do I sign? And that's how I met Fellini."

=== Filming ===
Most of the film was shot at the Cinecittà Studios in Rome. Set designer Piero Gherardi created over eighty locations, including the Via Veneto, the dome of Saint Peter's with the staircase leading up to it, and various nightclubs. However, other sequences were shot on location such as the party at the aristocrats' castle filmed in the real Bassano di Sutri palace north of Rome. (Some of the servants, waiters, and guests were played by real aristocrats.) Fellini combined constructed sets with location shots, depending on script requirements—a real location often "gave birth to the modified scene and, consequently, the newly constructed set." The film's last scenes where the monster fish is pulled out of the sea and Marcello waves goodbye to Paola (the teenage "Umbrian angel") were shot on location at Passo Oscuro, a small resort town situated on the Italian coast 30 kilometers from Rome. (Note: The feature documentary, Fellini: I'm a Born Liar, shows many of these real locations used throughout the director's films.)

Fellini scrapped a major sequence that would have involved the relationship of Marcello with Dolores, an older writer living in a tower, to be played by 1930s Academy Award-winning actress Luise Rainer. If the director's dealings with Rainer "who used to involve Fellini in futile discussion" were problematic, biographer Kezich argues that while rewriting the screenplay, the Dolores character grew "hyperbolic" and Fellini decided to jettison "the entire story line."

The scene in the Trevi Fountain was shot over a week in winter: in March according to the BBC, in late January according to Anita Ekberg. Fellini claimed that Ekberg stood in the cold water in her dress for hours without any trouble while Mastroianni had to wear a wetsuit beneath his clothes - to no avail. It was only after the actor "polished off a bottle of vodka" and "was completely pissed" that Fellini could shoot the scene.

==== Paparazzo ====
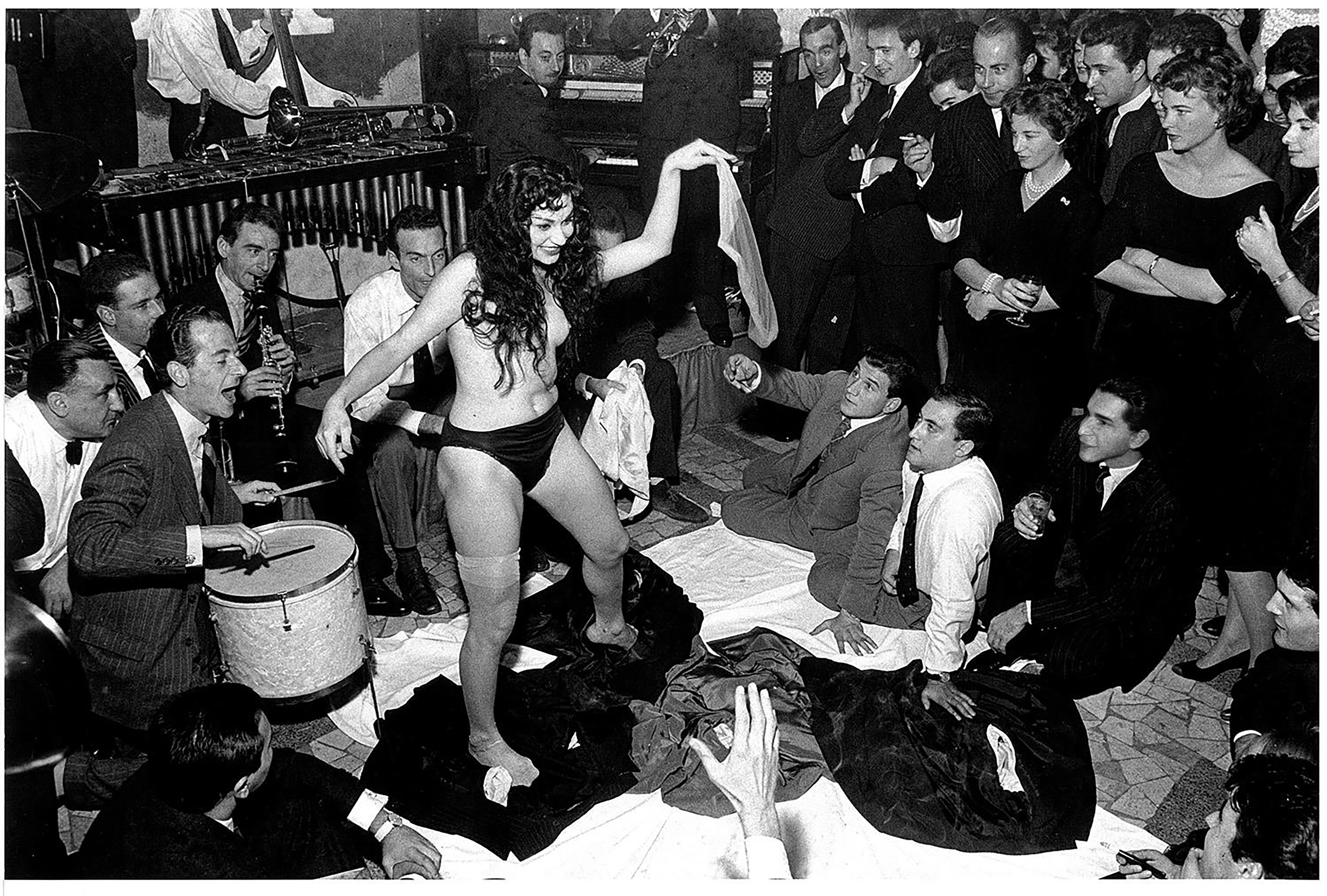
One of Secchiaroli's famous photos of Aïché Nana's striptease at Rugantino in 1958, which inspired Federico Fellini

The character of Paparazzo, the news photographer (Walter Santesso), was inspired by photojournalist Tazio Secchiaroli and is the origin of the word paparazzi, used in many languages to describe intrusive photographers. As to the origin of the character's name itself, Fellini scholar Peter Bondanella argues that although "it is indeed an Italian family name, the word is probably a corruption of the word papataceo, a large and bothersome mosquito. Ennio Flaiano, the film's co-screenwriter and creator of Paparazzo, reports that he took the name from a character in a novel by George Gissing." Gissing's character, Signor Paparazzo, is found in his travel book, By the Ionian Sea (1901). (Note: An alternative Italian spelling and description of the mosquito as pappatacio and "tiny with large wings" are also referenced.)

== Themes, motifs and structure ==
Marcello is a journalist in Rome during the late 1950s who covers tabloid news of movie stars, religious visions and the self-indulgent aristocracy while searching for a more meaningful way of life. Marcello faces the existential struggle of having to choose between two lives, depicted by journalism and literature. Marcello leads a lifestyle of excess, fame and pleasure amongst Rome's thriving popular culture, depicting the confusion and frequency with which Marcello gets distracted by women and power. A more sensitive Marcello aspires to become a writer, of leading an intellectual life amongst the elites, the poets, writers and philosophers of the time. Marcello eventually chooses neither journalism, nor literature. Thematically he opted for the life of excess and popularity by officially becoming a publicity agent.

The theme of the film "is predominantly café society, the diverse and glittery world rebuilt upon the ruins and poverty" of the Italian postwar period. In the opening sequence, a plaster statue of Jesus the Labourer suspended by cables from a helicopter, flies past the ruins of an ancient Roman aqueduct. (Note: The aqueduct can be seen from the railway south of Termini station in Rome or by visiting the Parco degli Acquedotti.) The statue is being taken to the Pope at the Vatican. Journalist Marcello and a photographer named Paparazzo follow in a second helicopter. The symbolism of Jesus, arms outstretched as if blessing all of Rome as it flies overhead, is soon replaced by the profane life and neo-modern architecture of the "new" Rome, founded on the economic miracle of the late 1950s. (Much of this was filmed in Cinecittà or in EUR, the Mussolini-style area south of Rome.) The delivery of the statue is the first of many scenes placing religious icons in the midst of characters demonstrating their "modern" morality, influenced by the booming economy and the emerging mass-consumer life.

=== Seven episodes ===
The most common interpretation of the film is a mosaic, its parts linked by the protagonist, Marcello Rubini, a journalist. The seven episodes are:

1. Marcello's evening with the heiress Maddalena (Anouk Aimée)
2. His long, frustrating night with the Swedish - American actress Sylvia (Anita Ekberg) that ends in the Trevi fountain at dawn
3. His reunion with the intellectual Steiner (Alain Cuny). Their relationship is divided into three sequences spread over the film: a) Initial encounter, b) Steiner's party and c) Steiner's tragedy
4. The fake miracle
5. Marcello's father's visit/Steiner's Party
6. The aristocrat's party/Steiner's tragedy
7. The "orgy" at the beach house

Interrupting the seven episodes is the restaurant sequence with the angelic Paola. The episodes are also framed by a prologue (Jesus over Rome) and epilogue (the monster fish), giving the film its innovative and symmetrically symbolic structure. The evocations are: seven deadly sins, seven sacraments, seven virtues, seven days of creation. Other critics disagree, as Peter Bondanella argues that "any critic of La dolce vita not mesmerized by the magic number seven will find it almost impossible to organize the numerous sequences on a strictly numerological basis".

=== An aesthetic of disparity ===
The critic Robert Richardson suggests that the originality of La Dolce Vita lies in a new form of film narrative that mines "an aesthetic of disparity". Abandoning traditional plot and conventional "character development", Fellini and co-screenwriters Ennio Flaiano and Tullio Pinelli forged a cinematic narrative that rejected continuity, unnecessary explanations and narrative logic in favour of seven non-linear encounters between Marcello, a kind of Dantesque Pilgrim and an underworld of 120 characters. The encounters build up a cumulative impression on the viewer that finds resolution in an "overpowering sense of the disparity between what life has been or could be, and what it actually is".

In a device used earlier in his films, Fellini orders the disparate succession of sequences as movements from evening to dawn. Also employed as an ordering device is the image of a downward spiral that Marcello sets in motion when descending the first of several staircases (including ladders) that open and close episodes. The upshot is that the film's aesthetic form, rather than its content, embodies the theme of Rome as a moral wasteland.

== Critical reception ==
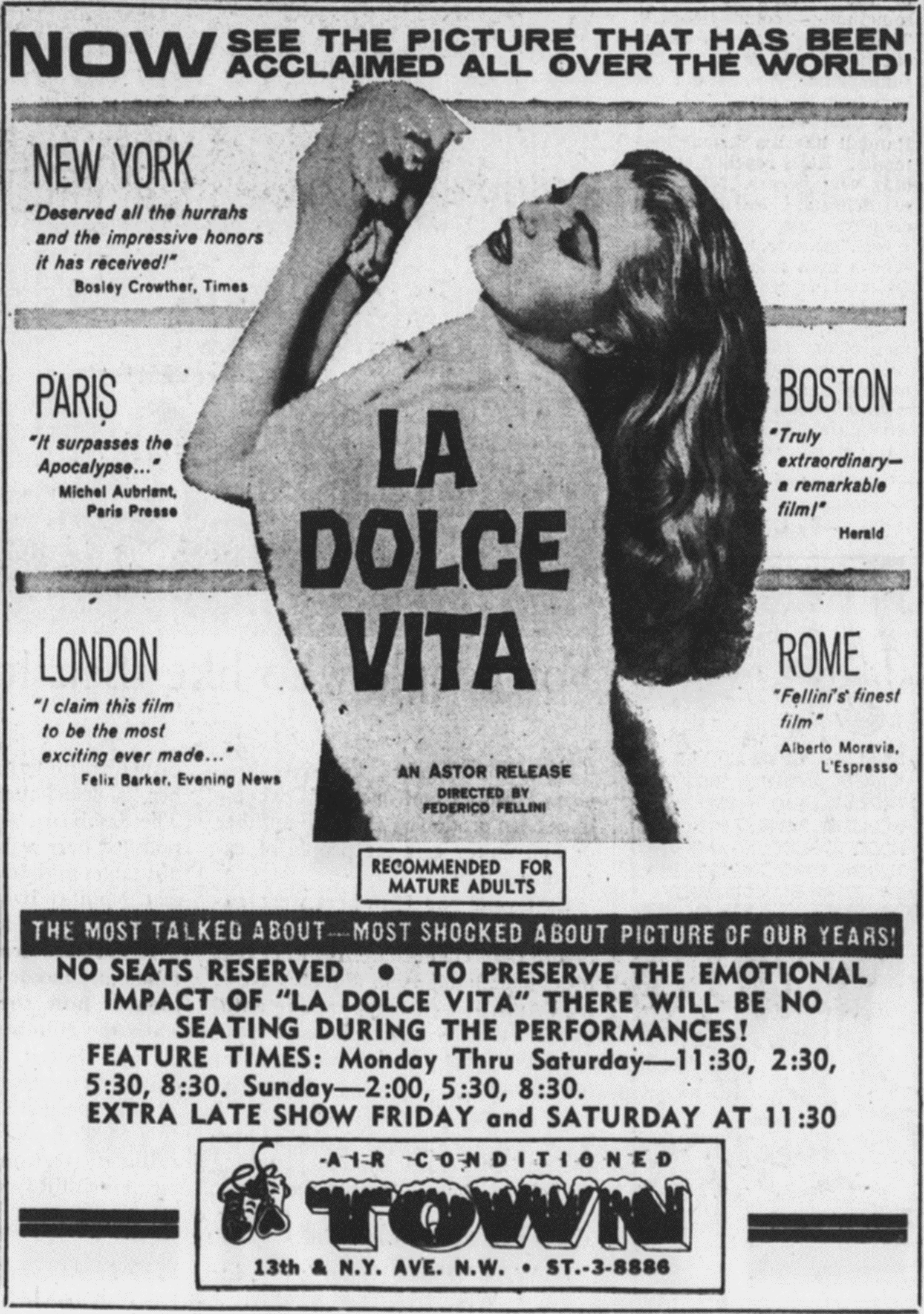
U.S theatrical advertisement from 1961

Writing for L'Espresso, the Italian novelist Alberto Moravia highlighted the film's variations in tone,

Highly expressive throughout, Fellini seems to change the tone according to the subject matter of each episode, ranging from expressionist caricature to pure neo-realism. In general, the tendency to caricature is greater the more severe the film's moral judgement although this is never totally contemptuous, there being always a touch of complacence and participation, as in the final orgy scene or the episode at the aristocrats' castle outside Rome, the latter being particularly effective for its descriptive acuteness and narrative rhythm.

In Filmcritica XI, Italian poet and film director Pier Paolo Pasolini (who was an uncredited writer on the film) argued that "La dolce vita was too important to be discussed as one would normally discuss a film.

Though not as great as Chaplin, Eisenstein or Mizoguchi, Fellini is unquestionably an author rather than a director. The film is therefore his and his alone... The camera moves and fixes the image in such a way as to create a sort of diaphragm around each object, thus making the object's relationship to the world appear as irrational and magical. As each new episode begins, the camera is already in motion using complicated movements. Frequently, however, these sinuous movements are brutally punctuated by a very simple documentary shot, like a quotation written in everyday language.

Jacques Doniol-Valcroze, film critic and co-founder of Cahiers du cinéma, felt that

"what La Dolce Vita lacks is the structure of a masterpiece. In fact, the film has no proper structure: it is a succession of cinematic moments, some more convincing than others… In the face of criticism, La Dolce Vita disintegrates, leaving behind little more than a sequence of events with no common denominator linking them into a meaningful whole".

The New York Times film critic Bosley Crowther praised Fellini's

brilliantly graphic estimation of a whole swath of society in sad decay and, eventually, a withering commentary on the tragedy of the over-civilized... Fellini is nothing if not fertile, fierce and urbane in calculating the social scene around him and packing it onto the screen. He has an uncanny eye for finding the offbeat and grotesque incident, the gross and bizarre occurrence that exposes a glaring irony. He has, too, a splendid sense of balance and a deliciously sardonic wit that not only guided his cameras but also affected the writing of the script. In sum, it is an awesome picture, licentious in content but moral and vastly sophisticated in its attitude and what it says.

Roger Ebert considered La Dolce Vita as Fellini's best film, as well as his favorite film of all time, and listed it consistently in his top ten films for the Sight & Sound Greatest Films poll every ten years. Ebert's first review for the film, published in October 1961, was nearly the first film review he wrote, before he began his career as a film critic in 1967. The film was a touchstone for Ebert, as his perspective on the movie and his life evolved over time, summarized in his 1997 Great Movie review:

Movies do not change, but their viewers do. When I saw "La Dolce Vita" in 1960, I was an adolescent for whom "the sweet life" represented everything I dreamed of: sin, exotic European glamour, the weary romance of the cynical newspaperman. When I saw it again, around 1970, I was living in a version of Marcello's world; Chicago's North Avenue was not the Via Veneto, but at 3 a.m. the denizens were just as colorful, and I was about Marcello's age. When I saw the movie around 1980, Marcello was the same age, but I was 10 years older, had stopped drinking, and saw him not as a role model but as a victim, condemned to an endless search for happiness that could never be found, not that way. By 1991, when I analyzed the film a frame at a time at the University of Colorado, Marcello seemed younger still, and while I had once admired and then criticized him, now I pitied and loved him. And when I saw the movie right after Mastroianni died, I thought that Fellini and Marcello had taken a moment of discovery and made it immortal.

Kevin Thomas of Los Angeles Times wrote

Federico Fellini's 1960 "La Dolce Vita" is one of the key works of the modern cinema. A brilliantly conceived epic fable about a scandal reporter (Marcello Mastroianni) adrift in Rome's high life, it introduced the term paparazzi into the vocabulary, and depicted, with a judicious mixture of satire and compassion, the glitter world of celebrity now avidly chronicled in supermarket tabloids.

Praising Fellini's direction he wrote

"La Dolce Vita" is also one of the triumphs of have-it-both-ways filmmaking: Fellini reveals the emptiness, boredom and destructiveness of the Via Veneto existence while at the same time making it highly glamorous and seductive..."La Dolce Vita" (Times-rated Mature for adult themes and situations) reminds us just how enduring and intuitively cinematic a storyteller Fellini is.

Review aggregator website Rotten Tomatoes gives the film a 95% approval score based on 81 reviews, with an average rating of 9.10/10. The consensus states: "An epic, breathtakingly stylish cinematic landmark, La dolce vita remains riveting in spite of—or perhaps because of—its sprawling length". On Metacritic, the film has a 95/100 rating based on 13 critics, indicating "universal acclaim".

=== Box office ===
The film was a big hit in Europe with 13,617,148 admissions in Italy and 2,956,094 admissions in France, for a combined 16,573,242 tickets sold in both countries. The film had the second most admissions for an Italian film behind War and Peace and was one of the top 10 most watched films in Italy.

The film earned $6 million in rentals in the United States and Canada in its original release and was the highest-grossing foreign language film at the US box office. The film was re-released in North America in 1966 by American International Pictures and earned $1.5 million in rentals. The total gross was $19,516,348.

=== Censorship ===
Perceived by the Catholic Church as a parody of the second coming of Jesus, the opening scene and the film itself were condemned by the Vatican newspaper L'Osservatore Romano in 1960. Umberto Tupini, the Italian Minister of Culture under Prime Minister Fernando Tambroni, censored it and other "shameful films". Subject to widespread censorship, the film was also banned in Spain until the death of dictator Francisco Franco in 1975. In Portugal, the film took ten years before it was permitted to be shown, due to the censorship that the country experienced during the years of the authoritarian Estado Novo regime.

=== Awards and recognition ===
La Dolce Vita was nominated for four Academy Awards, and won one for Best Costume Design: Black-and-White. It also earned the Palme d'Or (Golden Palm) at the 1960 Cannes Film Festival. The film won best foreign language film award at New York Film Critics Circle awards and National Board of Review awards. It was also nominated for a BAFTA award in best film from any source category.

The New York Times described La Dolce Vita as "one of the most widely seen and acclaimed European movies of the 1960s". Entertainment Weekly voted it the 6th Greatest film of all time in 1999. The Village Voice ranked the film at number 112 in its Top 250 "Best Films of the Century" list in 1999, based on a poll of critics. The film was included in "The New York Times Guide to the Best 1,000 Movies Ever Made" in 2002. In 2010, the film was ranked #11 in Empire magazine's "The 100 Best Films of World Cinema". In the British Film Institute's 2002 Sight & Sound polls of the greatest films ever made, La Dolce Vita ranked 24th in critics' poll and 14th in directors' poll. In the 2012 version of the list La Dolce Vita ranked 39th in critics' poll and 37th in directors' poll. In January 2002, the film was included on the list of the "Top 100 Essential Films of All Time" by the National Society of Film Critics. The film was Voted at No. 59 on the list of "100 Greatest Films" by the prominent French magazine Cahiers du cinéma in 2008. In 2007, the film was ranked at No. 19 by The Guardian's readers poll on the list of "40 greatest foreign films of all time". In 2010, The Guardian ranked the film 23rd in its list of 25 greatest arthouse films. In 2016, The Hollywood Reporter ranked the film 2nd among 69 counted winners of the Palme d'Or to date, concluding "What's eternal is Fellini's melancholy realization that behind modern-day sin, redemption, distraction and the come-hither facade of the sweet life, there lurks only emptiness." The film ranked 10th in BBC's 2018 list of The 100 greatest foreign language films voted by 209 film critics from 43 countries around the world. In 2021 the film was ranked at No. 6 on Time Out magazine's list of The 100 best movies of all time and continues to make lists for essential movies to watch.

== In popular culture ==
- One of the characters, Paparazzo, is the inspiration for the popular metonym "paparazzi", a word for intrusive photojournalists.
- Totò, Peppino e... la dolce vita is a 1961 Italian film parodying Fellini's and shot on the same sets.
- In Pietro Germi's Divorce Italian Style (1961), Daniela Rocca chooses to flee the little town with her lover Leopoldo Trieste the night her husband, Marcello Mastroianni, their relatives and neighbors are all at the opening screening of La Dolce Vita. In a packed cinema hall, an ecstatic audience watches Anita Ekberg performing her famous rock'n'roll dance.
- The 1964 Bob Dylan song "Motorpsycho Nightmare" contains a reference to the film with the lyrics, "Then in comes his daughter whose name was Rita, she looked like she stepped out of La Dolce Vita."
- In Ettore Scola's movie We All Loved Each Other So Much (1974), the accidental meeting between former lovers Stefania Sandrelli and Nino Manfredi takes place during the filming of the Fontana di Trevi scene with Fellini and Mastroianni acting as themselves.
- American rock duo Sparks' 1979 synth-pop album No. 1 in Heaven features a song titled 'La Dolce Vita.'
- "Tributes to Fellini in the "Director's Cut" of Cinema Paradiso (1988) include a helicopter suspending a statue of Jesus over the city and scenes in which the Trevi Fountain is used as a backdrop while Toto, the main character, grows up to be a famous film director.
- Steve Martin's 1991 film L.A. Story opens with an homage to the helicopter scene. In this version, the helicopter carries a giant hot dog over Los Angeles.
- The 1995 New Power Generation song "The Good Life" contains a reference to the film with the lyrics "La Dolce Vita was the knob that turned me on / Marcello Mastroianni, Italian mack, comin' on strong"
- The 2003 film Under the Tuscan Sun has a female character wading into the Trevi Fountain to reenact the scene from La Dolce Vita with the landlord of an Italian villa.
- The German film Good bye Lenin (2003) also includes a reference to the scene of Jesus suspended over the city of Rome, replacing it with a statue of Lenin being carried over East Berlin after the fall of the Berlin wall.
- In Sofia Coppola's film Lost in Translation (2003), Kelly's interview for LIT resembles Sylvia's interview scenes in La Dolce Vita. Charlotte and Bob later meet in the middle of the night and watch the famous Trevi Fountain sequence while drinking sake. Coppola said, "I saw that movie on TV when I was in Japan. It's not plot-driven, it's about them wandering around. And there was something with the Japanese subtitles and them speaking Italian—it had a truly enchanting quality".
- In a 2004 episode of The Sopranos titled, "Marco Polo", Bobby enters Junior's room to find him watching La Dolce Vita. Junior comments on the opening scene, in which the statue of Jesus is flown across Rome by helicopter, saying, "You could tell it was a dummy!"
- A 2010 episode of Anthony Bourdain: No Reservations titled "Rome" was filmed as an homage to La Dolce Vita. Shot mainly in black and white, the episode features several visual allusions and call backs to the film, and Bourdain himself mentions the title several times.
- The Italian film The Great Beauty (2013) features a former writer who wanders through the parties of the Roman high society trying to decide what to do with his life.
- The 2014 song "Froot" by Welsh singer Marina and the Diamonds mentions the line "living la dolce vita" as a reference to the film.
- The 2019 Ferrari Roma uses the slogan "la nuova Dolce Vita" as a reference to the film.

== See also ==
- List of cult films

== Bibliography ==
- Bondanella, Peter (1978). Federico Fellini: Essays in Criticism. New York: Oxford University Press
- Bondanella, Peter (1992). The Cinema of Federico Fellini. Princeton: Princeton University Press.
- Costantini, Costanzo (ed.)(1994). Fellini on Fellini. London: Faber and Faber.
- Fava, Claudio, and Aldo Vigano (1985). The Films of Federico Fellini. New York: Citadel Press.
- Fellini, Federico (1976). Fellini on Fellini. London: Eyre Methuen.
- —, and Damian Pettigrew (2003). I'm a Born Liar: A Fellini Lexicon. New York: Harry N. Abrams, Inc. ISBN 0-8478-3135-3
- Kezich, Tullio (2006). Federico Fellini: His Life and Work. New York: Faber and Faber. ISBN 978-0-571-21168-5
