= I'm a Born Liar =

I'm a Born Liar: A Fellini Lexicon
- 2003 first edition cover
- Author: Federico Fellini, Damian Pettigrew with preface by Tullio Kezich.
- Translator: Damian Pettigrew
- Cover artist: Brankica Kovrlija
- Language: English
- Genre: Interviews
- Publisher: Harry N. Abrams
- Publication date: December 7, 2003
- Publication place: United States
- Media type: Print (Hardback)
- Pages: 176 pages
- ISBN: 0-8109-4617-3
- OCLC: 52334896
- Dewey Decimal: 791.43/0233/092 21
- LC Class: PN1998.3.F45 A5 2003

I'm a Born Liar: A Fellini Lexicon is a book combining film stills and photographs with transcripts of the last filmed interviews with Federico Fellini conducted by Canadian filmmaker Damian Pettigrew in Rome in 1991 and 1992. The interviews are edited and introduced by Pettigrew with a preface by Italian film critic and Fellini biographer Tullio Kezich.

Designed as a companion to the feature documentary, Fellini: I'm a Born Liar (which, in contrast, uses a single photo of Fellini as a baby), the book has 125 film stills of Fellini at work and many unpublished photographs recently restored by the Cineteca del Comune di Bologna (Italy) .

== Summary ==
Introduced by novelist Italo Calvino to Federico Fellini (1920–1993) on the set of Fellini's And the Ship Sails On in 1983, Pettigrew shot in-depth interviews with Fellini, material later used in his documentary. Returning to their original q&a, he extracted a compilation of Fellini's responses.

Arranged alphabetically according to subject, the transcripts focus on the maestro's late philosophical views leavened with quips and one-liners, the enigma of memory and inspiration, style and aesthetics that were conducted expressly as a filmed testament in collaboration with Pettigrew. Sepia scrapbook photos appear alongside b&w stills from 8½, La Dolce Vita, La Strada, I vitelloni, and others while color images are selected from classics such as Amarcord, Fellini Satyricon, And the Ship Sails On, Intervista, City of Women, Roma, and Juliet of the Spirits. Production photos capture Fellini on Cinecittà sets, directing and gesticulating.

== Reception ==
In his on-line Film Comment review, critic Michael Rowin judged the volume as "one of the great documents of Fellini in his own words, as well as a beautiful photographic journey through his cinema".

Publishers Weekly also reviewed the book favorably, describing the page designs by Brankica Kovrlija as "beautiful... festooned with torn-paper effects and flamboyant fonts, a stylish setting to display" quotes from the film transcripts that run "the A-to-Z gamut from actors ('An actor's face and body are more important to me than plot structure'), Anita Ekberg ('a glorious apparition!') and Antonioni, to clowns, death, God, guilt, Hollywood, music, puppets, vagabonds, Visconti and women, 'the source of man's creativity.' As screenwriter Tullio Kezich notes in his foreword, Fellini is a 'matador of words' ".

Reviewers Odell and LeBlanc at Bookmunch wrote: "Flamboyant, witty yet showing signs of insecurity and angst, Fellini is as open as he is defensive. From the flippant ("God may not play dice but he enjoys a good round of Trivial Pursuit every now and again") and the surreal (dreams of Picasso making him omelettes), the moving (his brief epitaph to Nina Rota) and the insightful (the genesis of some of his most beloved projects), Fellini Lexicon has plenty to enjoy either as a straight read or to dip into."
