= NISI MASA =

NISI MASA European Network of Young Cinema
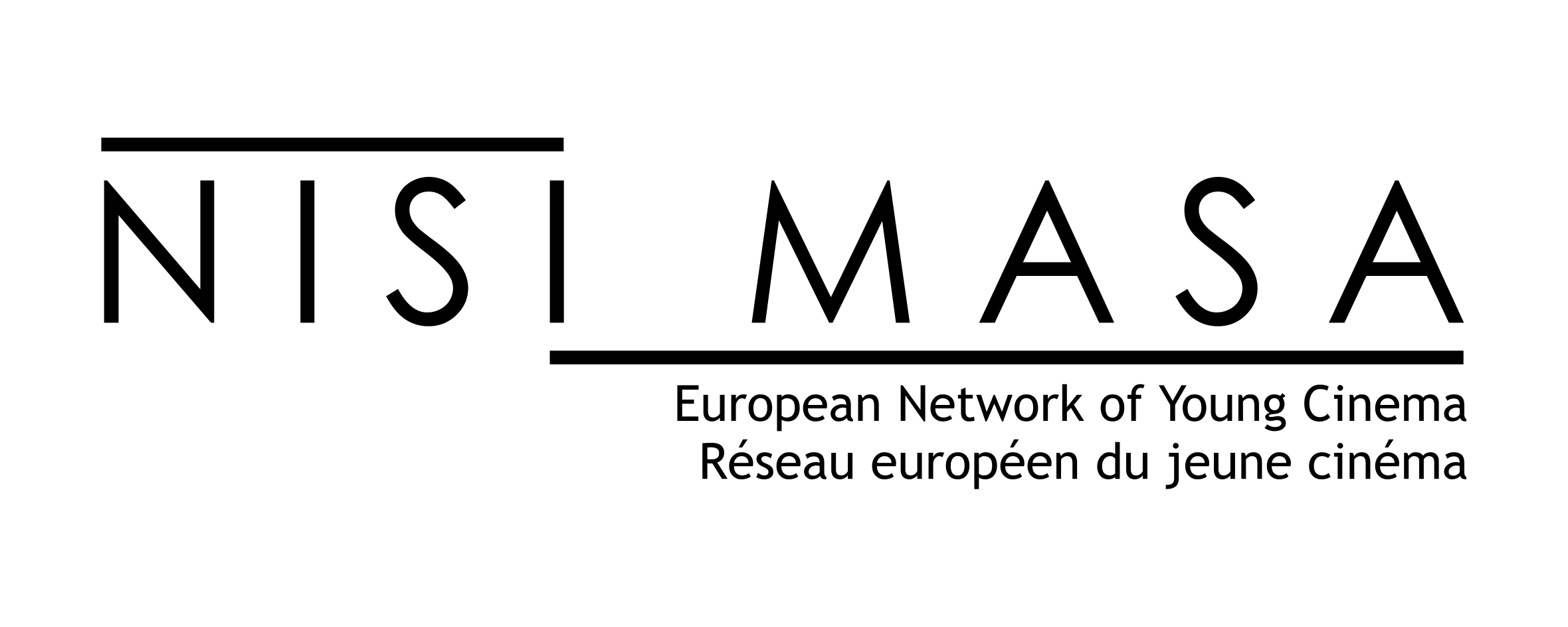
- Founded: 2001; 25 years ago
- Type: Non-profit
- Purpose: Youth, Cinema
- Location: Europe
- Services: Scriptwriting, Film workshops, Film Journalism, Publications, Seminars
- Key people: Matthieu Darras, Guillaume Desmartin, Paul Calori, Frédéric Cheng, Guillaume Giovanetti, founding members
- Website: nisimasa.com

NISI MASA is a nonprofit organization promoting young professionals in the European film industry. It is formed from 28 national member bodies.

The non-profit organization is supported by the European Union: Youth, Civil Society and MEDIA Programme, the Council of Europe, the European Cultural Foundation, Fondation de France and the French Ministry of Youth, Sports and Associative Life.

It is most widely known for Nisimazine, a daily magazine produced during the Cannes Film Festival and several other film festivals, and European Short Pitch, an annual event that combines a scriptwriting workshop in residency and a co-production forum.

== Origins ==
NISI MASA was founded in 2001 by three film enthusiast friends who wanted to create a Europe-wide platform for cooperation between young filmmakers. More than eleven years later, the number of countries in the network has increased to 26. Currently there are 28 member associations with over 1500 individual members.

The name 'NISI MASA' is a reference to the film 8½ by Federico Fellini, in which Marcello Mastroianni transmits the phrase "Asa Nisi Masa" to a clairvoyant. The film, a European cinema classic, and the sentence, an incantation belonging to no specific language, both reflect the cinematic and cross-border spirit of the network.

== The network ==
NISI MASA is present in 26 countries all around Europe, with a total of 31 member associations dedicated to cinema in different fields. All the NISI MASA member associations organize workshops, screenings, conferences and seminars and all kind of activities related to cinema.

The 28 associations part of NISI MASA are:

- Albania – First Step Association
- Austria – kino5
- Bulgaria – Seven
- Croatia – Palunko
- Croatia – KinoKlub Zagreb
- Czech Republic – Kino Praha
- Czech Republic – InVitr0
- Denmark – Aarhus Short Film Challente
- Estonia – Nisi Masa Estonia
- Finland – Euphoria Borealis
- France – Festival du Cinema de Brive
- France – Kino Paname
- Germany – Munich Film Society
- Greece – PSAROKOKALO
- Italy – Franti Nisi Masa Italia
- Italy – Lago Film Fest
- Kosovo – 7arte
- Lithuania – Kaunas International Film Festival
- Luxembourg – Filmreakter
- Macedonia – Cre8ive8
- Montenegro – Cinemapolis
- Netherlands – Breaking Ground
- Norway – Filmkraft
- Poland – Ad Arte (www.adarte.pl)
- Portugal – FEST – Associação Cultural
- Russia – Generation Campus
- Russia – Cinetrain
- Spain – CINESTESIAS
- Sweden – Nisi Masa Sweden
- UK – Encounters
- Ukraine – CinemaHall

NISI MASA develops its own projects, but always collaborates closely with the member associations, creating an inter-cultural and youth exchange all around Europe.

== Publications ==
NISI MASA has published books, magazines, catalogues and e-books about its workshops, trainings and projects.

- NISIMAZINE: Daily editions have been printed of its regular publication NISIMAZINE, during several film festivals, in the framework of film journalism workshops for young European film critics. NISIMAZINE film journalism workshops were held at the Cannes Film Festival, Torino Film Festival, La Biennale di Venezia, Karlovy Vary Film Festival, Abu Dhabi Film Festival, IDFA, and Rotterdam Film Festival.
- Books: After a big project, a book and/or e-book is published about its results, summarizing all the topics discussed during the activity. The results are useful books about audiovisual, film and culture in Europe.
- MAS Y MAS: A monthly network newsletter focusing on trends in the European cinema industry and news concerning NISI MASA members and young European filmmakers in general.
- Films: European films realized in the frame of NISI MASA workshops are distributed through international film festivals from all around the world and also through pedagogical and thematic screenings organised by universities, associations, museums and socio-cultural institutions.

The films produced since 2006 by NISI MASA are online at Vimeo. The films are edited in DVD and the benefits of the sales help support the next projects of young filmmakers and help NIS MASA in its aim to promote the European young cinema.
