= The White Line (1950 film) =

1950 film

- Film poster
- Directed by: Luigi Zampa
- Written by: Clare Catalano; Piero Tellini; Stefano Terra
- Produced by: Bianca Lattuada; Carlo Ponti
- Starring: Gina Lollobrigida; Raf Vallone; Erno Crisa
- Cinematography: Carlo Montuori
- Edited by: Eraldo Da Roma
- Music by: Carlo Rustichelli
- Production company: Lux Film
- Distributed by: Lux Film
- Release date: 26 September 1950
- Running time: 87 minutes
- Country: Italy
- Language: Italian

The White Line (Italian: Cuori senza frontiere) is a 1950 Italian drama film directed by Luigi Zampa and starring Gina Lollobrigida, Raf Vallone and Erno Crisa.

The film's sets were designed by the art director Aldo Buzzi. Some location shooting took place in the Free Territory of Trieste, located between Italy and Tito's Yugoslavia.

== Cast ==
- Gina Lollobrigida as Donata Sebastian
- Raf Vallone as Domenico
- Erno Crisa as Stefano
- Cesco Baseggio as Giovanni Sebastian
- Enzo Staiola as Pasqualino Sebastian
- Ernesto Almirante as The Grandfather
- Gino Cavalieri as The Priest
- Fabio Neri as Gaspare
- Mario Sestan as Lampadina
- Antonio Catania as Acquasanta
- Giordano Cesini as Cacciavitte
- Callisto Cosulich as Soviet Officer
- Tullio Kezich as Yugoslav Lieutenant
- Piero Grego as US Army Sergeant
- Gianni Cavalieri as Pentecoste

== Bibliography ==
- Chiti, Roberto & Poppi, Roberto. Dizionario del cinema italiano: Dal 1945 al 1959. Gremese Editore, 1991.
