= Life and Work =

Life and Work may refer to

- Life and Work (magazine), a Church of Scotland magazine
- Life and Work (conference), a 1925 ecumenical conference and programme
- Principles: Life & Work, a 2017 book by hedge fund manager Ray Dalio

== See also ==
- The dictionary definition of life's work at Wiktionary
- The dictionary definition of lifework at Wiktionary
- My Life and Work, a 1922 autobiography by Henry Ford
- Federico Fellini: His Life and Work, a 1987 biography by Tullio Kezich
- Sontag: Her Life and Work, a 2019 biography by Benjamin Moser about Susan Sontag
- Life's Work, a 1990s U.S. TV sitcom
- Life (disambiguation)
- Work (disambiguation)
