= Asa Nisi Masa =

Phrase from the film 8 1/2

Asa Nisi Masa is a cryptic phrase featured in a key scene of Federico Fellini's 1963 film 8½. The phrase is believed to originate from a children's linguistic game known as the "serpentine alphabet" (Italian: alfabeto serpentino), in which syllables like sa or si are inserted between the consonants of a word to obscure its meaning.

When decoded, "Asa Nisi Masa" reveals the Italian word anima, meaning "soul" or "spirit." This interpretation connects to the film’s themes of inner consciousness, memory, and the protagonist's search for personal and creative fulfillment.

The phrase has since become emblematic of Fellini’s surrealistic and introspective storytelling style.

== Context ==
In the film 8½, at about the 36 minute mark, Guido Anselmi, the fictional film director played by Marcello Mastroianni and representing Fellini's alter ego, is attending a party on the grounds of the resort where he is staying. There is a clairvoyant Maya (played by Mary Indovino) who is using her assistant Maurice (played by Ian Dallas) to move from guest to guest attempting to read their minds. When Maurice sees Guido begin to leave, he runs up to him (it turns out they are old friends). Guido asks Maurice "Can you transmit anything?", and Maurice agrees to try. Maya writes on her blackboard "ASA NISI MASA", which Guido confirms is the phrase he was thinking of.

"But what does it mean?" Maurice asks, and the film immediately transitions in a flashback to Guido's childhood.

=== Flashback ===
Guido is a little boy, being pampered by the women in his life; bathed in wine, then wrapped up in freshly-warmed blankets and carried off to bed. As he and the other children are supposed to be falling asleep, one of them declares that the eyes in a painting on the wall can be made to move by reciting the phrase "Asa Nisi Masa, Asa Nisi Masa."

By tying together Guido's distant past with his present, the viewer is reminded that our adult motivations are never far from our childhood desires. Later in the film, in the so-called "harem sequence," Guido dreams of being bathed and pampered as an adult in exactly the same way.

== Meaning ==
Although the phrase "Asa Nisi Masa" has no translation in any known language – and Fellini never publicly revealed the meaning of the phrase – it is generally thought that Fellini used an Italian children’s game, similar to Pig Latin, to create it. In the game the syllables "si" and "sa" are added to existing words to obscure them, which Fellini does with the word "anima": A-sa + Ni-si + Ma-sa. The word "anima" has dual significance in this context; not only is it the Italian word for "soul" but it is also a key concept in the work of the Swiss psychotherapist Carl Jung (of whom Fellini was fond), where "anima" is the term for the female aspect of the personality in men, a common Fellini theme.

Like "Rosebud" in Orson Welles' Citizen Kane, or the madeleine in Marcel Proust's In Search of Lost Time, "Asa Nisi Masa" becomes a central plot point, a MacGuffin, as a gateway to crucial memories of the central character – even though it is itself peripheral to the central story.

== Influence ==
The European Network of Young Cinema NISI MASA was named after this phrase. The Norwegian jazz-metal band Shining has a track "Asa Nisi Masa" on their 2007 album Grindstone. The American punk-cabaret band Nervous Cabaret also has a track "Asa Nisi Masa", on its 2005 self-titled album. The American band Typhoon uses "asa nisi masa" as a lyric in its 2018 album Offerings. The Polish free jazz group Silberman Quartet released their first full length album, titled Asanisimasa. Lucrezia Bonarota writes that Asa Nisi Masa is a phrase that "suggests that meaning is not always explicit, but hidden in codes, dreams, and misreadings" and that for his 2025 photobook that borrows the phrase for its title, Blake Andrews "borrows this enigma not as a cinematic citation, but as a conceptual anchor".
