= Tazio Secchiaroli =

Italian photographer (1925–1998)

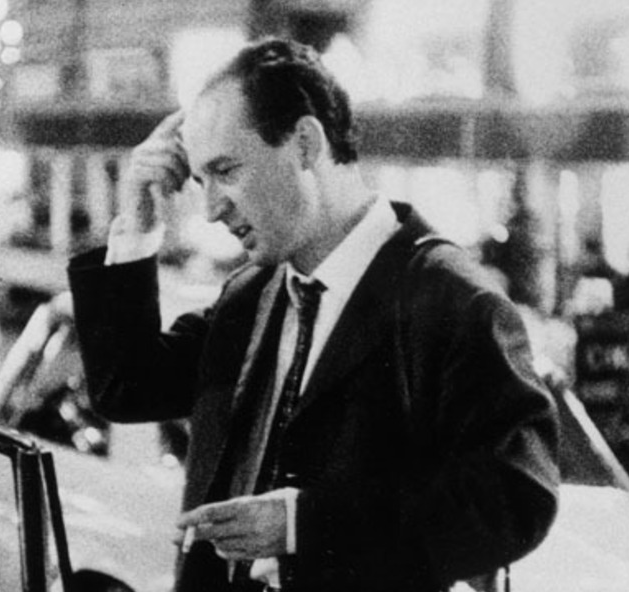
Tazio Secchiaroli

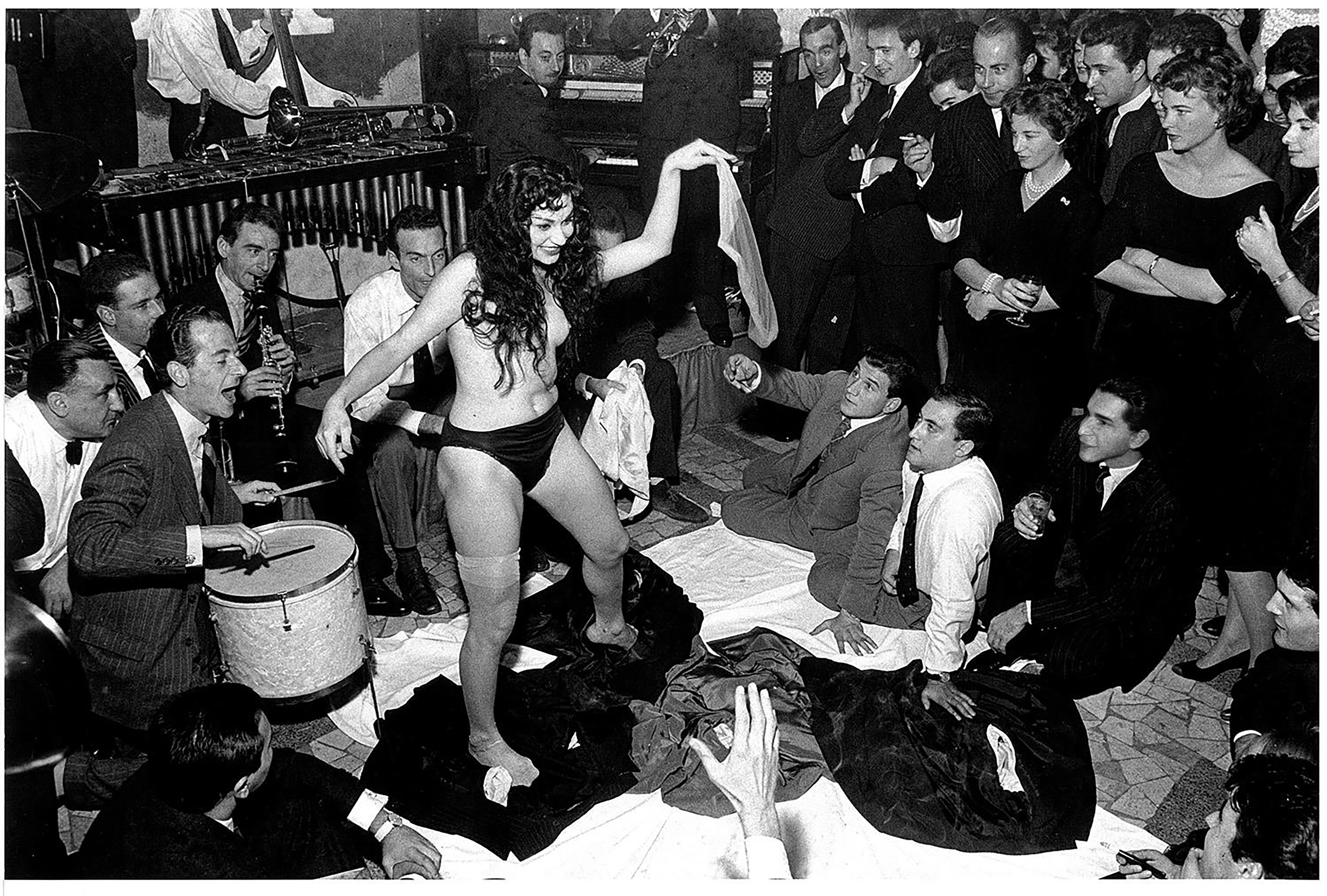
One of Secchiaroli's famous photos of Aïché Nana's striptease at Rugantino in 1958, which inspired Federico Fellini with a famous and controversial scene from the film La Dolce Vita

Tazio Secchiaroli (26 November 1925 – 24 July 1998) was an Italian photographer known as one of the original paparazzi. He founded the agency Roma Press Photo in 1955.

Secchiaroli was the inspiration for the Paparazzo character in Fellini's film La Dolce Vita. Much of Fellini's research into the profession of tabloid journalism was simply buying dinner for Secchiaroli and his friends, and listening to their exploits.

Ironically, by the time the term 'paparazzi' was coined, Secchiaroli had become more of an insider in the Italian film industry and had left the paparazzi-style attack photography behind. He became well known for informal candid portraits of film stars, both at the studio and at their homes.

== Early life ==
Secchiaroli was born on 26 November 1925, in Centocelle, a suburb of Rome. Centocelle was at that time much further away culturally from the big city than its ten-kilometer distance would indicate.

His father made sure he was employed on his summer breaks, so he would learn useful skills. Secchiaroli was proud of his carpentry and metalworking skills throughout his life.

He took his first photographs in 1941, mostly unremarkable, though one shows a possible early manifestation of the news photographer's sense of timing – an image of a friend on a bicycle with a flying soccer ball frozen in time next to his head.

After a short time working at Cinecittà, the movie studio that would be so central to his later professional career, he worked as a 'scattino' or itinerant street photographer, doing portraits of tourists.
