= Desmond O'Grady (poet) =

Irish poet (1935–2014)

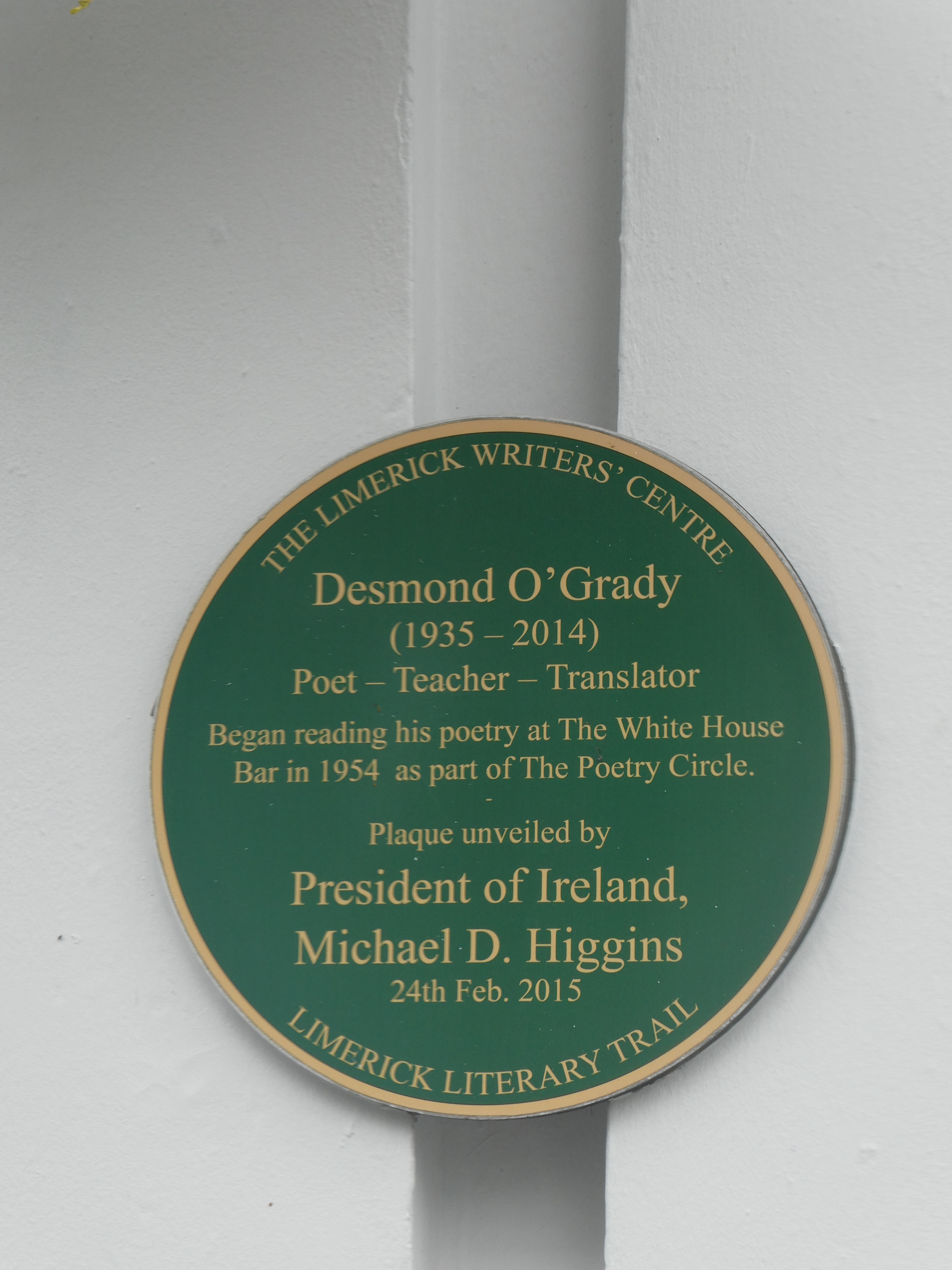
A plaque for Desmond O'Grady in Limerick, Ireland

Desmond O'Grady (1935–2014) was an Irish poet, teacher, translator and memoirist.

He was born Desmond James Bernard O'Grady in Limerick on 27 August 1935. He was a native Irish speaker. At the age of 19 he left Ireland for Paris and taught English at the Berlitz School, following in the footsteps of James Joyce. Ezra Pound noticed his first collection, Chords & Orchestrations (1956), and there ensued a lively correspondence, followed by an invitation to Italy to work as Pound's secretary. O'Grady also took work at a radio station, and had a cameo role as himself in Federico Fellini's film La Dolce Vita. He later became a teaching fellow at Harvard University, where he earned a PhD in Celtic Studies. He then taught in Cairo, Alexandria, and at the American Overseas School of Rome. At the end of the 1980s, he returned to Ireland and settled in Kinsale, where he spent the rest of his life.

Seamus Heaney said of him: "Desmond O’Grady is one of the senior figures in Irish literary life, exemplary in the way he has committed himself over the decades to the vocation of poetry and has lived selflessly for the art."

He was a member of the Aosdána, an academy of Irish writers with a limited number of members. Membership is by invitation only.

On 24 February 2015, Irish president Michael D. Higgins unveiled a plaque in O'Grady's honor at the White Horse Bar in Limerick.

== Works ==
- Chords & Orchestrations (Limerick: McKerns Printing Works, 1956)
- Reilly (London: The Phoenix Press, 1961)
- Off License (Dublin: The Dolmen Press, 1968). Translations from Irish, Italian and Armenian poetry.
- Sing Me Creation (Oldcastle, Co. Meath: Gallery Press, 1977)
- The Headgear of the Tribe: Selected Poems (Oldcastle, Co. Meath: Gallery Press, 1978)
- A Limerick Rake (Versions from Irish) (Oldcastle, Co. Meath: Gallery Press, 1978)
- His Skaldcrane’s Nest (Oldcastle, Co. Meath: Gallery Press, 1979)
- Trawling Tradition. Translations 1954–1994 (Salzburg: Poetry Salzburg, 1994)
- The Road Taken. Poems 1956–1996 (Salzburg: Poetry Salzburg, 1996)
- The Wide World. A Desmond O'Grady Casebook. With New Poems 2003, edited by Wolfgang Görtschacher & Andreas Schachermay (Salzburg: Poetry Salzburg, 2003)
- On My Way (Daedalus Press, 2006)
