= Viviana Mazza =

Italian writer and journalist, born 1978

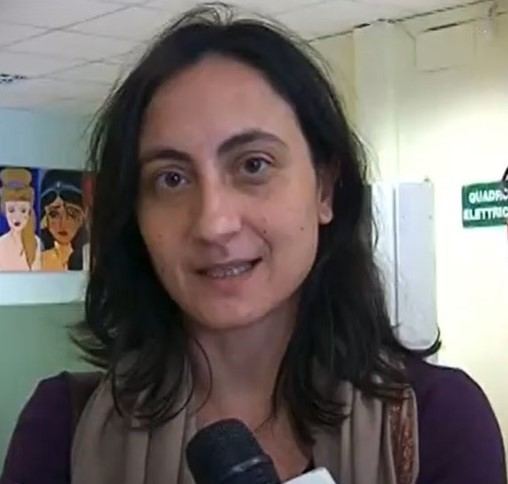
- Mazza in 2016
- Born: 15 June 1978 (age 48); Catania, Sicily
- Occupations: Writer, journalist

Viviana Mazza (born 15 June 1978, Catania, Sicily) is a writer and a journalist. She has been the U.S. correspondent for the Italian daily newspaper Corriere della Sera since 1 November 2022. She covers the White House and US politics, has covered both the Trump and the Biden/Harris campaigns, the Trump trials in New York and D.C., and she has travelled with the US President as part of the Press Corps for the G7, G20 and other summits.

At Corriere she had specialized, since 2006, in covering the United States and the Middle East. She also covered, among other countries, Pakistan, Afghanistan and Nigeria. She edited the America-Cina newsletter and contributed to the La27Ora blog.

In November 2015 (together with Paolo Valentino) she was the first European newspaper journalist to interview the Iranian president, Hassan Rouhani, after his election.

On 1 November 2022, Mazza became only the second woman to be appointed US correspondent for Corriere della Sera.

She has published the following books for Mondadori: Storia di Malala (July 2013), Il Bambino Nelson Mandela (November 2014) and a version of the Storia di Malala book for younger children (September 2015). In April 2016, she published Ragazze rubate, written with Adaobi Tricia Nwaubani. It tells the story of the young girls kidnapped in Nigeria by Boko Haram. In July 2016 a version for younger readers of Il Bambino Nelson Mandela was published. In October 2018 she published Guerrieri di sogni. Storie e paesi che dovresti conoscere. In May 2019, she published Greta. La ragazza che sta cambiando il mondo. In June 2020 she published La ragazza che imparò a volare. Storia di Simone Biles. In May 2021, Mondadori published Il bambino fiocco di neve in a special easy-to-read edition for children and people with reading difficulties. In September 2021, Mondadori published Il potere della musica, a story taken from Guerrieri di sogni. Storie e paesi che dovresti conoscere with new, original illustrations by Paolo d'Altan. In October 2021, Mondadori published Io dico no al razzismo written together with Kibra Sebhat.

In collaboration with Minna Proctor she translated Tullio Kezich's book Federico Fellini His Life and Work into English.

She contributed a chapter to Che cos'è l'ISIS, a collaborative effort by Corriere della Sera journalists.

In March 2019 Solferino Libri published Le ragazze di via Rivoluzione.

On 22 June 2019, she was made an honorary citizen of Solarino, a town in the province of Syracuse, Sicily: the birthplace of her mother and grandmother.

In April 2026, after a telephone call with U.S. President Donald Trump, she was the first journalist to reveal that Trump had severely criticised one of his allies, the Italian Premier Georgia Meloni.

In September 2026 Bompiani Editore published L'America che verrà dopo Trump.

== Biography ==
Mazza studied at the liceo classico Mario Cutelli in Catania. She then moved to Turin, where she obtained her bachelor's degree at Turin University (2001). After Turin she won a Fulbright Scholarship and completed a Master of Science in Journalism at Columbia University, New York (2004). She was also awarded a Graduate Diploma in Refugee Studies at the American University in Cairo, Egypt (2005).

She has worked for or collaborated with several newspapers and magazines: La Stampa, Giornale di Sicilia, Colors , Egypt Today.

== Bibliography ==
- Kezich, Tullio. Federico Fellini : his life and work. New York: Faber and Faber, 2006. ISBN 978-0865479616.
- Mazza, Viviana, and Paolo d'Altan. Storia di Malala. Milano: Mondadori, 2013. ISBN 978-8804639770.
- Mazza, Viviana, and Paolo d'Altan. Il bambino Nelson Mandela. Milano: Mondadori, 2014. ISBN 978-8804657859.
- Mazza, Viviana, and Paolo d'Altan. La storia di Malala : raccontata ai bambini. Milano: Mondadori, 2015. ISBN 978-8804655626.
- Mazza, Viviana, Adaobi Nwaubani, and Paolo d'Altan. Ragazze rubate. Milano: Mondadori, 2016. ISBN 9788804660798
- Mazza, Viviana, and Paolo d'Altan. Guerrieri di sogni. Storie e paesi che dovresti conoscere. Milano: Mondadori, 2018. ISBN 978-8804705765
- Mazza, Viviana. Le ragazze di via Rivoluzione. Solferino, 2019. ISBN 978-88-282-0125-0
- Mazza, Viviana. Greta. La ragazza che sta cambiando il mondo. Mondadori, 2019. ISBN 978-88-04-71901-4
- Mazza, Viviana. La ragazza che imparò a volare. Storia di Simone Biles. Mondadori, 2020. ISBN 978-8804728368
- Mazza, Viviana. Il bambino fiocco di neve. Mondadori, 2021. ISBN 978-8804739074
- Mazza, Viviana, and Paolo d'Altan. Il potere della musica. Mondadori, 2021. ISBN 978-8804742784
- Mazza, Viviana, and Kibra Sebhat. Io dico no al razzismo. Mondadori, 2021. ISBN 978-8804743880
- Mazza, Viviana. L'America che verrà dopo Trump. ISBN 9788830119413

== Awards ==
- Marco Luchetta Prize for Journalism 2010
- Amerigo Award 2010
- Nino Martoglio International Literary Prize 2014
- Giovanni Arpino Prize 2014
- Mediterranean Award - Jury Prize 2015
- Festival Giornalisti del Mediterraneo - Medaglia di Bronzo del Presidente della Camera dei Deputati 2016
- Premio Letterario Delle Quattro Libertà 2019 - "Libertà di opinione", for her book Le Ragazze di via Rivoluzione
- Premio Biaggio Agnes per Reportage 2020
- Premio Estra per lo Sport 2020
- Premiolino 2026
