= Peter Bondanella =

Peter Bondanella (1943–2017) was Distinguished Professor Emeritus of Italian, Comparative Literature, and Film Studies at Indiana University, United States. He received his bachelor's degree in French and political science from Davidson College, his master's degree in political science from Stanford University, and his doctorate in comparative literature from the University of Oregon.

== Selected publications ==
- Machiavelli and the Art of Renaissance History. Detroit: Wayne State University Press, 1973. ISBN 0-8143-1499-6.
- Federico Fellini: Essays in Criticism. Edited by Peter Bondanella. Oxford: Oxford University Press, 1978. 315 pp. ISBN 0-19-502274-2.
- The Eternal City: Roman Images in the Modern World. Chapel Hill: University of North Carolina Press, 1987. 286 pp.
- Vasari, Giorgio. The Lives of the Artists. Translated with an introduction and notes by Julia Conaway Bondanella and Peter Bondanella. Oxford: Oxford World's Classics, 1991. ISBN 9780199537198.
- The Cinema of Federico Fellini. Princeton: Princeton University Press, 1992. "Foreword" by Federico Fellini. 396 pp. Translations into Italian and Chinese.
- Umberto Eco and the Open Text: Semiotics, Fiction, Popular Culture. Cambridge: Cambridge University Press, 1997.
- The Films of Federico Fellini. Cambridge: Cambridge University Press, 2002. 205 pp. ISBN 0-521-57573-7.
- Hollywood's Italians: Dagos, Palookas, Romeos, Wise Guys, and Sopranos. New York: Continuum International, 2004. 352 pages and 55 still photographs.
- A History of the Italian Cinema. New York: Continuum, 2009.
- New Essays on Umberto Eco. Cambridge: Cambridge University Press, 2009.

== Awards ==
- Election to European Academy for the Sciences and the Arts (2009).
- Distinguished Service Award, University of South Florida.
- Pulitzer Prize Nomination for The Eternal City: Roman Images in the Modern World (1987).
