= Callisto Cosulich =

Italian film critic and author (1922–2015)

Callisto Cosulich (7 July 1922 – 6 June 2015) was an Italian film critic, author, journalist and screenwriter.

Born in Trieste, Cosulich studied marine engineering at the University of Genoa and during the Second World War, as a reserve officer in the Navy, he took care of film screenings aboard a cruiser. Come back in his hometown, he began to work as a film critic for the local newspaper Giornale di Trieste. In 1947 he co-founded the Federation of Italian film clubs (FICC), becoming its secretary in 1950.

Moved to Rome, Cosulich collaborated as a film critic with a large number of publications, and cured for RAI television several monographic film cycles about Japanese cinema, New Hollywood, Billy Wilder, Josef von Sternberg, Yasujirō Ozu and sports films. He was also active as a screenwriter for a number of films, notably Mario Bava's Planet of the Vampires. He was co-founder, with Enrico Rossetti, of the first Italian arthouse cinema, the Quirinetta Cinema in Rome, which significantly contributed to the spread of art films in Italy.

Cosulich was member of the jury at the 53rd Venice International Film Festival and at the 37th Berlin International Film Festival.

He died on 6 June 2015.
