= Federico Fellini: His Life and Work =

1987 book by Tullio Kezich

- Author: Tullio Kezich
- Original title: Federico. Fellini, la vita e i film
- Translator: Minna Proctor with Viviana Mazza
- Language: Italian
- Subject: Federico Fellini
- Genre: biography
- Publisher: Camunia (1987); Feltrinelli (2002)
- Publication date: 1987, 2002
- Publication place: Italy
- English publication date: 2006
- Pages: 424 (2002)
- ISBN: 9788807490200

Federico Fellini: His Life and Work (Italian: Federico. Fellini, la vita e i film) is a biography about the Italian filmmaker Federico Fellini, written by the critic Tullio Kezich. The first version of the book was published in 1987 as Fellini. A revised and expanded version was published in Italian in 2002 and English in 2006.

== Summary ==
Kezich, a film critic for Corriere della sera who had known Fellini since 1952, covers Fellini's personal life and work in cinema. He identifies a consistent sympathy for underdogs and traces a trajectory from an early interest in nostalgia and folklore to a mature, although eccentric, confrontation with modern life. The book covers Fellini's personal and professional relationships with collaborators such as his actress wife Giulietta Masina, the composer Nino Rota, the cinematographer Giuseppe Rotunno, the producer Dino De Laurentiis and the actor Marcello Mastroianni.
