= Tullio Kezich =

Italian screenwriter and playwright (1928–2009)

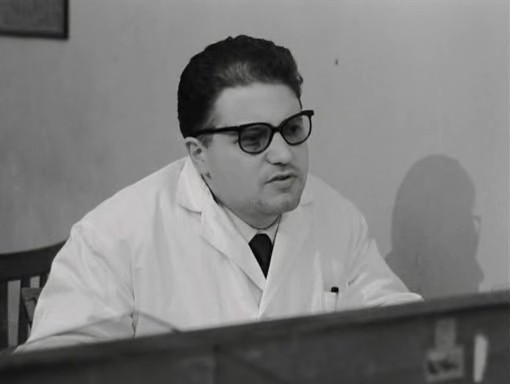
Tullio Kezich (1961)

Tullio Kezich (17 September 1928 in Trieste – 17 August 2009 in Rome) was an Italian screenwriter and playwright, best known as the film critic for Corriere della Sera and for his biography of Italian director Federico Fellini, Federico Fellini: His Life and Work.

== Biography ==
Kezich's experience as a film critic began in 1941 as an adolescent reader for the Italian magazines Cinema and Movies. He started reviewing professionally for Radio Trieste in 1946. In the early 1950s, he became a film critic with the Venice Film Festival, a collaboration that would last for over 60 years, and with the cinema magazine Sipario for which he later became editorial director between 1971-1974.

In 1982, he was a member of the jury at the 34th Berlin International Film Festival.

During his long career as a film critic, he collaborated with Settimana Incom and the weekly magazine Panorama, as well as the newspapers La Repubblica and Corriere della Sera. His film reviews for Panorama and Corriere della Sera were published in several volumes.

The author of numerous books on cinema, Kezich was also an actor and a playwright whose work is still widely performed throughout Europe.

Kezich died in Rome after a long illness, a month before his 81st year.

== Screenwriting and producing ==
In 1950, Kezich worked as production secretary on Cuori senza frontiere by Luigi Zampa, in which he also had a small role alongside fellow film critic Callisto Cosulich.

In 1961, he participated as an actor in Il posto by Ermanno Olmi. That same year, he co-founded 22 dicembre, a film company that produced Il terrorista by Gianfranco De Bosio and Roberto Rossellini’s film for television, L'età del ferro (The Iron Age). Kezich was the company's artistic director until it folded in 1965, the year he moved to Rome to work on the script and television production of Olmi’s I recuperanti. Various productions followed including television adaptations of work by Cervantes, Dostoevsky, and Italo Svevo.

In 1987, Kezich co-wrote the screenplay, La leggenda del santo bevitore (The Legend of the Holy Drinker), based on the novel by Joseph Roth. Directed by Ermanno Olmi and starring Rutger Hauer, the film won the Golden Lion at the Venice Film Festival in 1988.

In 2008, he was interviewed for the documentary Il falso bugiardo (The False Liar) by Claudio Costa on Italian screenwriter Luciano Vincenzoni.

== Biography of Fellini ==
Recognized as a world specialist on Federico Fellini, his biography of the Italian director was published by Camunia in 1987 before it was revised and expanded and published by Feltrinelli in 2002. It was published in English as Federico Fellini: His Life and Work in 2006. The film historian and critic Peter Cowie wrote that the book surpassed all the other works on the director in English, French and Italian.

== Filmography ==
Year	Title	Role	Notes
1950	The White Line	Yugoslav Lieutenant	
1952	Shadows Over Trieste	Screenwriter	
1961	Il Posto	Psychologist	Uncredited, (final film role)
2008	Il falso bugiardo	Himself	
