= Pierluigi =

- Gender: Male

Origin
- Origin: Italy

Other names
- Related names: Peter, Piero, Louis, Luigi

Pierluigi is an Italian masculine given name meaning "Peter Louis". It is often an abbreviation of "Piero Luigi". Notable people with this given name include:

- Pierluigi Balducci, Italian musician
- Pierluigi Benedettini, Sammarinese footballer
- Pierluigi Cappello (1967-2017), Italian poet
- Pierluigi Cappelluzzo, Italian footballer
- Pierluigi Carafa (1677-1755), Italian cardinal
- Pierluigi Casiraghi, Italian footballer
- Pierluigi Cera, Italian footballer
- Pierluigi Collina, Italian football referee
- Pierluigi Conforti, Italian road racer
- Pierluigi Frattali, Italian footballer
- Pierluigi Gollini, Italian footballer
- Pierluigi Martini, Italian racing driver
- Pierluigi Marzorati, Italian basketball player
- Pierluigi Oliverio, American politician
- Pierluigi Pairetto, Italian football referee
- Pierluigi Praturlon (1924-1999), Italian photographer
- Pierluigi Samaritani, Italian opera designer
- Pierluigi Sangalli, Italian comics artist
- Pierluigi Ussorio (born 1967), Italian sports shooter
- Pierluigi Zappacosta, Italian businessman
- Giovanni Pierluigi da Palestrina, Italian composer

== See also ==
- Gian
- Gianluigi
