= Rinaldo Geleng =

Italian painter (1920–2003)

- Born: 19 June 1920; Rome, Italy
- Died: 15 May 2003 (aged 82); Rome, Italy
- Occupations: Painter and poster artist
- Children: Giuliano Geleng, Antonello Geleng

Rinaldo Geleng (19 June 1920 - 15 May 2003) was an Italian painter and film poster artist.

A friend of Federico Fellini, he created the posters for five of his films: Roma, Fellini's Casanova, City of Women, And the Ship Sails On and Ginger and Fred, as well as various scene paintings (for example, the antique frescoes in Roma, or the paintings in And the Ship Sails On). He has also created posters for films by other directors, such as Boy on a Dolphin, Before Him All Rome Trembled, The Crystal Ball or Champion.

As a painter he specializes in portraiture.
