= Zampieri =

Zampieri is an Italian surname. Notable people with the surname include:

- Caio Zampieri (born 1986), Brazilian tennis player
- Daniel Zampieri (born 1990), Italian racing driver
- Domenico Zampieri (1581–1641), known as Domenichino, Italian painter
- Gian Luigi Zampieri (born 1965), Italian conductor
- John Zampieri (1941-2021), American politician
- Mara Zampieri (born 1951), Italian opera singer
- Ricardo Zampieri (born 1995), Brazilian politician
- Steve Zampieri (born 1977), Swiss cyclist
