= Gianluigi =

- Pronunciation: Italian: [dʒanˈlui:dʒi]
- Gender: Male

Origin
- Origin: Italy

Other names
- Related names: John, Louis, Lewis, Gian Luigi, Giovanni Luigi, Gigi

Gianluigi is an Italian masculine given name meaning "John Louis". It is often an abbreviation of "Giovanni Luigi". Famous people with this given name include:

- Gianluigi Braschi, Italian film producer
- Gianluigi Buffon, Italian footballer
- Gianluigi Donnarumma, Italian footballer
- Gianluigi Galli, Italian racing driver
- Gianluigi Gelmetti, Italian conductor
- Gianluigi Jessi, Italian basketball player
- Gianluigi Lentini, Italian footballer, once the most expensive player
- Gianluigi Nuzzi, Italian journalist, essayist and television presenter
- Gianluigi Paragone, Italian journalist and television presenter
- Gianluigi Quinzi, Italian tennis player
- Gianluigi Scalvini, Italian motorcycle road racer
- Gianluigi Trovesi, Italian jazz saxophonist
- Gianluigi Zuddas, Italian author
- Gian Luigi Berti, Sammarinese captain regent
- Gian Luigi Boiardi, Italian politician
- Gian Luigi Bonelli, Italian cartoonist, writer and publisher
- Gian Luigi Gessa, psychiatrist and Italian pharmacologist
- Gian Luigi Macina, Sammarinese long-distance runner
- Gian Luigi Nespoli, Italian poet and writer
- Gian Luigi Polidoro, Italian director, actor and screenwriter
- Gian Luigi Rondi, Italian screenwriter
- Gian Luigi Zampieri, Italian conductor

== See also ==
- Gian
- Giovanni (name)
- John (first name)
- John Louis (disambiguation)
- Giancarlo
