= Gian Luigi Gessa =

Gianluigi Gessa
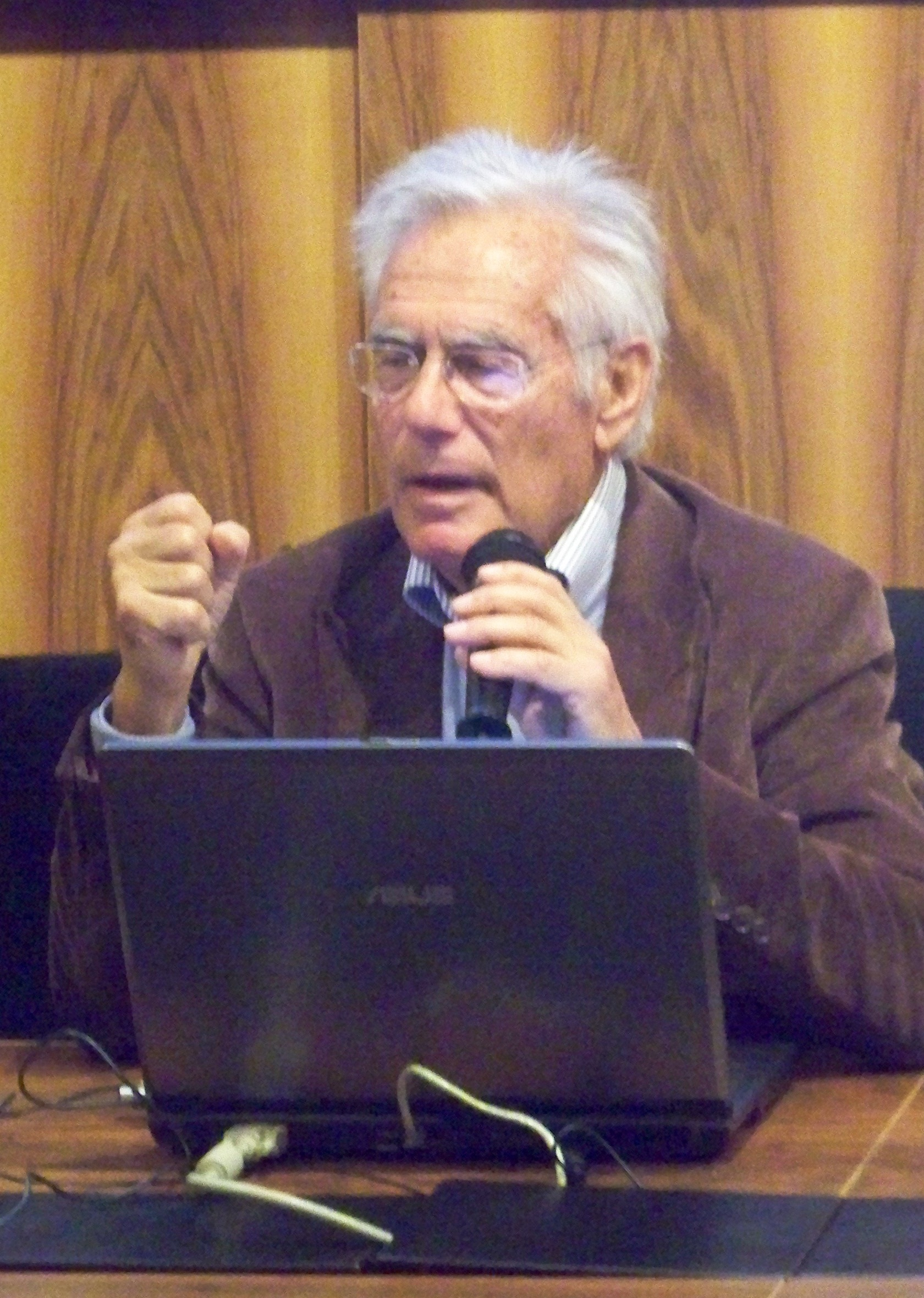
- Gianluigi Gessa at a conference
- Born: 13 July 1932 (age 94); Cagliari, Italy
- Scientific career
- Fields: Pharmacology; Neuroscience; Psychiatry
- Institutions: University of Cagliari
- Website: gianluigigessa.wordpress.com/home

Gian Luigi Gessa is a professor of neuropsychopharmacology at the University of Cagliari, where he has led for a long time the Department of Neurosciences. He is the leader of the Italian group that studies drug addiction. He also directed the research groups of the National Research Council.

He worked as a researcher at the National Institutes of Health by Bethesda (Maryland) led by Professor Bernard Brodie and Scripps Research Institute of La Jolla (California), before returning to Italy and becoming one of the most authoritative experts in neuropharmacological research.

Under his leadership, the Department of Neuroscience of University of Cagliari was ranked twenty-third place in the world among research institutes in the field of Pharmacology (Xenobiotics, Current Contents, Life Sciences, 1993). The Neuropharmacology department of Cagliari was also recognized by the Ministry of University and Scientific Research as a "Center of Excellence" for research on the Neurobiology of Addiction.

Professor Gessa is also head of the CICAP Sardinia and a member of the Scientific Committee of "Journal of Psychiatry" located at University of Rome "La Sapienza". He also served as president of the Italian Society of Pharmacology (SIF). He is currently professor emeritus of pharmacology at the University of Cagliari and an associate member of the Institute of Neurosciences of the National Research Council.

He received the Camillo Golgi Award from Accademia Nazionale dei Lincei for his research.

In 2004, he decided to join politics, by standing with the list of Renato Soru Project Sardinia as a regional councilor, being elected with 4613 preferences.

From June 2, 2006 he is Grand Officer of Order of Merit of the Republic.

Over the last hundred years, governments of different nations have appointed committees to establish the harms of marijuana on consumers and society. The conclusions of the commission, beginning with the 1894 Indian cannabis on the latest Cannabis Ministries of Health in 2002 Belgium, France, Switzerland, Germany and Holland, were that marijuana use is not such a serious problem to be in criminal cases the people who do use or possess for this purpose.

— Gian Luigi Gessa, Papers of the SIF, Italian Society of Pharmacology p.10 Vol.6 Ed 2006

== Works ==
=== Author ===
- Endorphines (1987), Pythagora Press.
- Psychopharmachology (1990), Collana manuali di medicina, Masson.
- Dopamine and Mental Depression (1990), Paperback.
- Dysthymia: Diagnosis and Treatment (1998), Mediserve.
- Interview on neuroscience (2003), CUEC.
- Cocaine (2008), Rubbettino.

=== Publisher ===
- Depression and Mania: From Neurobiology to Treatment (Advances in Biochemical Psychopharmacology) (1995), New York City:Raven Press

=== Articles and studies ===
- Marked inhibition of mesolimbic dopamine release: a common feature of ethanol, morphine, cocaine and amphetamine abstinence in rats..(1992), European Journal of Pharmacology
- Mesolimbic dopaminergic decline after cannabinoid withdrawal.(1998) National Academy of Sciences, U.S.
- Self-administration of the cannabinoid receptor agonist WIN 55,212-2 in drug-naive mice. (1998) Neuroscience
- Investigation on the relationship between cannabinoid CB1 and opioid receptors in gastrointestinal motility in mice (2004) British Journal of Pharmacology
- Prenatal exposure to a cannabinoid receptor agonist does not affect sensorimotor gating in rats. (2006), European Journal of Pharmacology
- Efficacy of rimonabant and other cannabinoid CB1 receptor antagonists in reducing food intake and body weight: preclinical and clinical data.(2006), CNS Drug Review
