= NBC Experiment in Television =

- Genre: Experimental
- Country of origin: United States

Production
- Running time: 60 mins.

Original release
- Network: NBC
- Release: February 19, 1967 – 1971

NBC Experiment in Television is an American experimental television show broadcast on NBC from 1967 to 1971. The format of the show was an anthology series and it usually aired on Sunday afternoons. Many of the episodes were either dramatic pieces or documentaries. The program was nominated for an Emmy in 1968 for editing.

The first episode in February 1967, Losers Weepers, was an original play by Harry Dolan about African-American life in an urban ghetto. In March, philosopher Marshall McLuhan explained his theory that "the medium is the message". In the season 4 premiere, "Music", the show documented the Beatles' recording of "Hey Jude".

In 1969 the program screened an episode produced and directed by Jim Henson and written by Henson and Jerry Juhl entitled The Cube and starring Richard Schaal. Henson also produced a documentary episode "Youth '68" the previous year.

== Episodes ==
=== Season 1 ===
- 1: Losers Weepers ... 19 February 1967
- 2: A Coney Island of the Mind ... 26 February 1967
- 3: Good Day ... 5 March 1967
- 4: This Is Marshall McLuhan: The Medium Is the Massage ... 19 March 1967
- 5: We Interrupt This Season ... 26 March 1967
- 6: Theater of the Deaf ... 2 April 1967
- 7: The Questions ... 9 April 1967
- 8: A Young American in Paris ... 23 April 1967
- 9: Movies in the Now Generation ... 30 April 1967

=== Season 2 ===
- 1: Four Days to Omaha ... 18 February 1968
- 2: The Hamster of Happiness ... 25 February 1968
- 3: Passport to Prague ... 3 March 1968
- 4: New Voices of Watts ... 17 March 1968
- 5: To Wally Pantoni We Leave a Credenza ... 31 March 1968
- 6: What Color Is the Wind ... 14 April 1968
- 7: Youth '68: Everything's Changing... or Maybe It Isn't ... 19 April 1968
- 8: Africa and I ... 28 April 1968

=== Season 3 ===
- 1: This Is Sholom Aleichem ... 7 February 1969
- 2: Color Me German ... 16 February 1969
- 3: The Cube ... 23 February 1969
- 4: The New Communicators ... 16 March 1969
- 5: Pinter People ... 6 April 1969
- 6: Fellini: A Director's Notebook ... 15 March 1969
- 7: Bye Bye Butterfly ... 13 April 1969
- 8: Big Sur ... 20 April 1969

=== Season 4 ===
- 1: Music! ... 22 February 1970
- 2: This Is Al Capp ... 1 March 1970
- 3: The Engagement ... 8 March 1970
- 4: A Bad Case of Shakespeare ... 22 March 1970
- 5: Moby Tick ... 12 April 1970

=== Season 5 ===
- 1: Buckminster Fuller on Spaceship Earth ... 7 February 1971
