= Bernard Beryl Brodie =

American biochemist

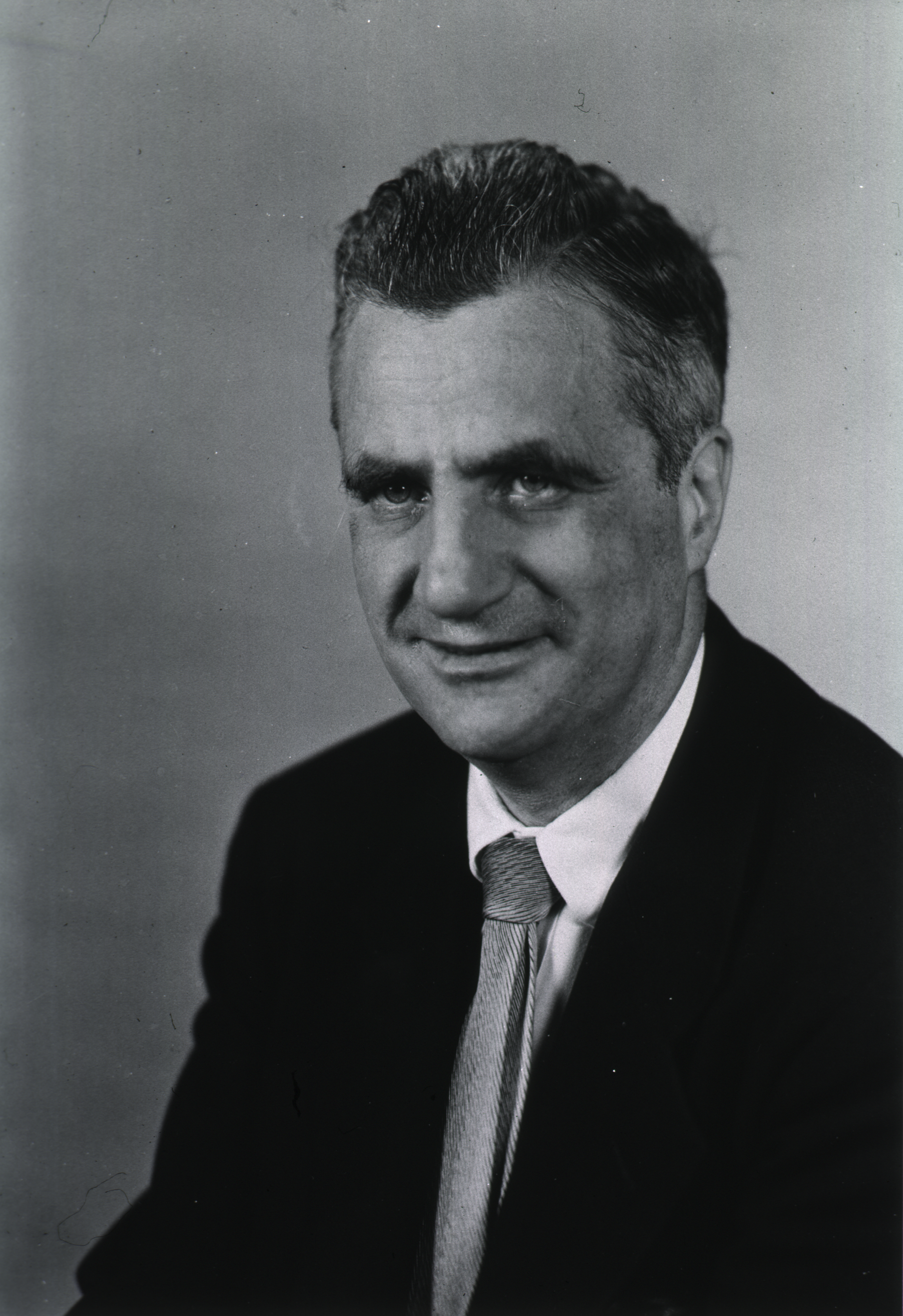
- Born: 7 August 1907; Liverpool, United Kingdom
- Died: 28 February 1989 (aged 81); Charlottesville, Virginia, U.S.
- Education: McGill University; New York University
- Known for: Studies of drug metabolism and drug therapy
- Awards: Distinguished Service Award of the Department of Health, Education and Welfare- 1958; Albert Lasker Award for Basic Medical Research- 1967; National Medal of Science- 1968
- Scientific career
- Fields: Pharmacology
- Workplaces: New York University 1935-1950; National Institutes of Health 1950-1970; Hoffmann-LaRoche; Pennsylvania State University

Bernard Beryl Brodie (7 August 1907 – 28 February 1989) was a founding scientist in the area of biochemical and neurochemical pharmacology whose work in the 1940s and 1950s had great impact. He was a major figure in the fields of drug metabolism and drug therapy, studying how the absorption and interactions of drugs in the body. Brodie helped to found and lead the Laboratory of Chemical Pharmacology at the National Heart Institute in Bethesda, Maryland, one of the National Institutes of Health. He was a member of the United States National Academy of Sciences.

== Career ==
Brodie was born in Liverpool, England on August 7, 1907, to a Jewish family, who emigrated to Ottawa, Canada in 1911. In 1926 he enlisted in the Royal Canadian Corps of Signals, where he learned boxing, winning a Canadian Army championship for his weight division.

Brodie earned an undergraduate degree from McGill University, graduating in 1931. He received a Ph.D. in chemistry from New York University (NYU) in 1935. After graduation, he accepted a position in the Pharmacology Department at NYU, working with George B. Wallace. Brodie developed methods for measurement of drug metabolism, disposition, and response, which enabled him to generalize from experimental data to underlying principles and concepts. During World War II, Brodie played a key role at the Goldwater Research Service group at NYU, led by James A. Shannon.

In 1950, Brodie was recruited by Shannon to join the National Heart Institute in Bethesda, Maryland, one of the National Institutes of Health. Brodie founded the pharmacology laboratory there, serving as head until he retired in 1970. He continued to a teach pharmacology at Pennsylvania State University and acted as a consultant to Hoffmann-LaRoche laboratories in Nutley, New Jersey.

== Research ==
During World War II, Brodie and others in the Goldwater Research Service group at NYU were tasked by James A. Shannon with developing an effective antimalarial therapy for use by allied troops. With Sidney Udenfriend, Brodie developed an assay that revealed the localization of atabrine in liver, skeletal muscle, and plasma. This led to the development of therapeutic regimens involving a high initial loading dose followed by small doses to maintain effective atabrine levels in plasma. In addition to establishing the basis for the effective treatment of malaria, Brodie's pioneering work established that blood drug levels were important in guiding therapeutic dosages. In January, 1947, he published several papers, based on the atabrine work, that described general principles for the separation and accurate measurement of drugs and their metabolites. His finding that drugs induced similar levels of response in humans and animals created a basis for the use of animal drug testing as a step towards determining whether they were suitable for humans.

Together with Julius Axelrod, Brodie discovered how two popular headache remedies of the day were causing the illness methemoglobinemia, a non-lethal blood condition. They found that acetanilide is metabolized to aniline, and phenacetin to p-phenetidin. Brodie and Axelrod identified another metabolite, paracetamol, as beneficial, and suggested that manufacturers use it instead. It was later marketed as the analgesic Tylenol.

Brodie also did research on anesthetic and hypnotic drugs. He correlated the distribution and clinical characteristics of thiopental, explaining Its rapid onset of action and its short duration as an anesthetic. He discovered that procainamide was effective in the treatment of severe heart arrhythmia. He also pioneered a drug therapy for gout.

Brodie determined that specific drugs affected the neurotransmitters serotonin and norepinephrine, which opened up the possibility of using anti-psychotic drugs to affect brain functioning and treat mental and emotional disorders. His work also helps to minimize toxic effects and increase drug effectiveness through appropriate selection of dosages. He proposed an approach to the treatment of schizophrenia, studying the transmission of nerve impulses in the brain.

The biography, Apprentice to Genius by Robert Kanigel, describes Brodie's scientific career and the impact he had on a group of scientists who have gone on to make prize-winning breakthroughs in biomedical science.

== Awards ==
Brodie was elected to the National Academy of Sciences in 1966 and held memberships in the American Chemical Society, the American Heart Association, the International Union of Basic and Clinical Pharmacology and others.

In 1967, Brodie received the Albert Lasker Award for Basic Medical Research for more than 30 years of work resulting in "extraordinary contributions to biochemical pharmacology." He has had a "profound influence" on pharmacology and the treatment of cardiovascular disease, emotional and behavioral disorders mental disorders, emotional disorders and cancer.

He has also received the Department of Health, Education and Welfare's Distinguished Service Award (1958), the National Medal of Science, presented by President Lyndon B. Johnson (1968), and the Golden Plate Award from the American Academy of Achievement (1970).

He was the author or co-author of more than 350 scientific publications.

The Bernard B. Brodie Award in Drug Metabolism and Disposition was first given in his honor in 1978 by the American Society for Pharmacology and Experimental Therapeutics. The neuroscience department of the University of Cagliari was named in his honour by a former student, Gian Luigi Gessa.

Brodie died in 1989 in Charlottesville, Virginia at the age of 81.

== Family ==
Bernard Brodie was a brother of polio researcher Maurice Brodie.
