= Spirits of the Dead =

1968 anthology film

- French theatrical release poster by Georges Allard
- French: Histoires extraordinaires
- Directed by: Roger Vadim; Louis Malle; Federico Fellini
- Screenplay by: Roger Vadim; Pascal Cousin; Louis Malle; Clement Biddle Wood; Federico Fellini; Bernardino Zapponi
- Dialogue by: Daniel Boulanger
- Based on: "Metzengerstein" "William Wilson" "Never Bet the Devil Your Head" (Note: Referred to as "Don't Wager Your Head to the Devil" in the credits of the English version.) by Edgar Allan Poe
- Produced by: Raymond Eger; Alberto Grimaldi
- Starring: Brigitte Bardot; Alain Delon; Jane Fonda; Terence Stamp; Françoise Prévost; James Robertson Justice; Peter Fonda; Carla Marlier; Philippe Lemaire; Serge Marquand
- Cinematography: Claude Renoir; Tonino Delli Colli; Giuseppe Rotunno
- Edited by: Hélène Plemiannikov; Franco Arcalli; Suzanne Baron; Ruggero Mastroianni
- Music by: Jean Prodromidès; Diego Mason; Nino Rota
- Production companies: Les Films Marceau-Cocinor; Produzioni Europee Associati (P.E.A.)
- Distributed by: Cocinor (France); P.E.A. (Italy)
- Release dates: June 1968 (Paris); 12 September 1968 (Italy)
- Running time: 121 minutes (Note: The individual runtimes of each segment are: "Metzengerstein": 38 minutes; "William Wilson": 37 minutes; "Toby Dammit": 43 minutes)
- Countries: France; Italy (Note: Regarding the film's national origins, Tim Lucas considers its French identity dominant, noting that the project was initiated by its French producer, Raymond Eger, and that all versions bear a copyright notice for Les Films Marceau-Cocinor.)
- Languages: French; Italian; English
- Box office: 946,137 admissions (France); ₤512 million (Italy)

Spirits of the Dead (French: Histoires extraordinaires, lit. 'Extraordinary Tales', Italian: Tre passi nel delirio, lit. 'Three Steps to Delirium'), also known as Tales of Mystery and Imagination and Tales of Mystery, is a 1968 horror anthology film comprising three segments respectively directed by Roger Vadim, Louis Malle and Federico Fellini, based on stories by Edgar Allan Poe. A French-Italian international co-production, the film's French title is derived from a 1856 collection of Poe's short stories translated by French poet Charles Baudelaire; the English titles Spirits of the Dead and Tales of Mystery and Imagination are respectively taken from an 1827 poem by Poe and a 1902 British collection of his stories.

Vadim's segment, "Metzengerstein", tells the story of the debauched Countess Frédérique de Metzengerstein (Jane Fonda), who devotes herself to taming a wild horse that once belonged to her cousin, Baron Wilhelm Berlifitzing (Peter Fonda). Malle's entry, "William Wilson", follows Wilson (Alain Delon), who is hounded throughout his life of cruelty and deception by a doppelgänger, whom he challenges to a fatal duel. Fellini's short, "Toby Dammit", a loose adaptation of "Never Bet the Devil Your Head", deals with the title character (Terence Stamp), an alcoholic Shakespearean actor, whose trip to Rome to make a Spaghetti Western in exchange for a Ferrari is complicated by multiple encounters with the Devil, who appears as a little girl with a white ball.

Spirits of the Dead was released in the United States by American International Pictures in an English-language version featuring narration by Vincent Price.

== Plot ==
=== "Metzengerstein" ===
At the age of 22, Countess Frédérique inherits the Metzengerstein estate and lives a life of promiscuity and debauchery. While in the forest, her leg is caught in a trap and she is freed by her cousin and neighbour Baron Wilhelm, whom she has never met because of a long-standing family feud. She becomes enamoured with Wilhelm, but he rejects her for her wicked ways. His rejection infuriates Frédérique and she sets his stables on fire. Wilhelm is killed attempting to save his prized horses.

One black horse somehow escapes and makes its way to the Metzengerstein castle. The horse is very wild and Frédérique takes it upon herself to tame it. She notices at one point that a damaged tapestry depicts a horse eerily similar to the one that she has just taken in. Becoming obsessed with the tapestry, she orders its repair. During a thunderstorm, Frédérique is carried off by the spooked horse into a fire caused by a lightning strike.

=== "William Wilson" ===
Bergamo, early 19th century. During the time Northern Italy is under Austrian rule, an army officer named William Wilson rushes to confess to a priest that he has committed murder. Wilson then relates the story of his cruel ways throughout his life. After playing cards all night against the courtesan Giuseppina, his doppelgänger, also named William Wilson, convinces people that Wilson has cheated. In a rage, the protagonist Wilson stabs the other to death with a dagger. After making his confession, Wilson commits suicide by jumping from a tower, but when seen, his corpse is transfixed by the same dagger.

=== "Toby Dammit" ===
Former Shakespearean actor Toby Dammit is losing his acting career to alcoholism. He agrees to work on a film, to be shot in Rome, for which he will be given a brand new Ferrari as a bonus incentive. Dammit begins to have unexpected visions of a macabre girl with a white ball. While at a film award ceremony, he gets drunk and appears to be slowly losing his mind. A beautiful woman comforts him, saying she will always be at his side if he chooses. Dammit is forced to make a speech, quoting the "sound and fury" speech from Macbeth, then leaves and takes delivery of his promised Ferrari.

Dammit races around the city, where he sees what appear to be fake people in the streets. Lost outside Rome, Dammit eventually crashes into a work zone and comes to a stop before the site of a collapsed bridge. Across the ravine, he sees a vision of the little girl with a ball (whom he has earlier identified, in a TV interview, as his idea of the Devil). He gets into his car and speeds toward the void. The Ferrari disappears, and Dammit is revealed to have been decapitated by a thick wire across the roadway. The girl from his vision picks up his severed head and the sun rises.

== Cast ==
Credits primarily adapted from Italian Gothic Horror Films, 1957–1969 and Midnight Movie Monographs: Spirits of the Dead (Histoires Extraordinaires).

"Metzengerstein"

- Jane Fonda as Countess Frédérique de Metzengerstein
- Peter Fonda as Baron Wilhelm Berlifitzing
- Serge Marquand as Hugues
- Philippe Lemaire as Philippe
- Carla Marlier as Claude
- Georges Douking as the upholsterer
- James Robertson Justice as a marquis
- Françoise Prévost as a courtesan
- Marie-Ange Aniès as a courtesan

Uncredited:

- Dennis Berry as a courtier
- Jackie Blanchot as a courtier
- Audoin de Bardot as the page
- Anny Duperey as a courtesan
- Andréas Voutsinas as a courtier
- Maurice Ronet as the narrator (French version)
- Clement Biddle Wood as the narrator (English version)

Despite receiving prominent billing in both the film and advertising materials, most of Justice and Prévost's performances appear to have been cut from the final print of the film.

"William Wilson"

- Alain Delon as William Wilson
  - Marco Stefanelli as Wilson as a boy
- Brigitte Bardot as Giuseppina Ditterheim (Josephine in the English version)
- Katia Christine as the blonde girl
- Renzo Palmer as the priest
- Umberto D'Orsi as Hans
- Daniele Vargas as the university professor

Uncredited:

- Paolo Giusti as Wilson's double
  - Massimo Ardù as Wilson's double as a boy
- Andrea Esterhazy as officer at casino
- John Karlsen as military school instructor
- Franco Arcalli as the teacher who beats Wilson

"Toby Dammit"

- Terence Stamp as Toby Dammit
- Marina Yaru as the Devil
- Salvo Randone as Father Spagna
- Anne Tonietti as the TV commentator
- Monica Pardo as Miki, the curly-haired actress

Uncredited:

- Antonia Pietrosi as "la signora"
- Federico Boido as Toby's double
- Marisa Traversi as Marilù Traversi (Marilù Lolo in the French version)
- Ferdinand Guillaume as the old blind actor
- Fabrizo Angeli as Maurizio Manetti
- Ernesto Colli as Ernestino Manetti
- Aleardo Ward as first TV interviewer
- Paul Cooper as second TV interviewer
- Milena Vukotic as third TV interviewer
- Nella Gambini as Elizabeth
- Andrea Fantasia as the producer
- Campanella as Lombardi, the assistant producer
- Brigitte as the old blind actor's aide
- Irina Maleeva as a gypsy fortune teller
- Giovanni Tarallo as an old paparazzo
- Fides Stagni as herself

Van Heflin appeared in a deleted scene in which he plays an actor in Trente dollari, the Spaghetti Western that Toby is cast in.

== Production ==
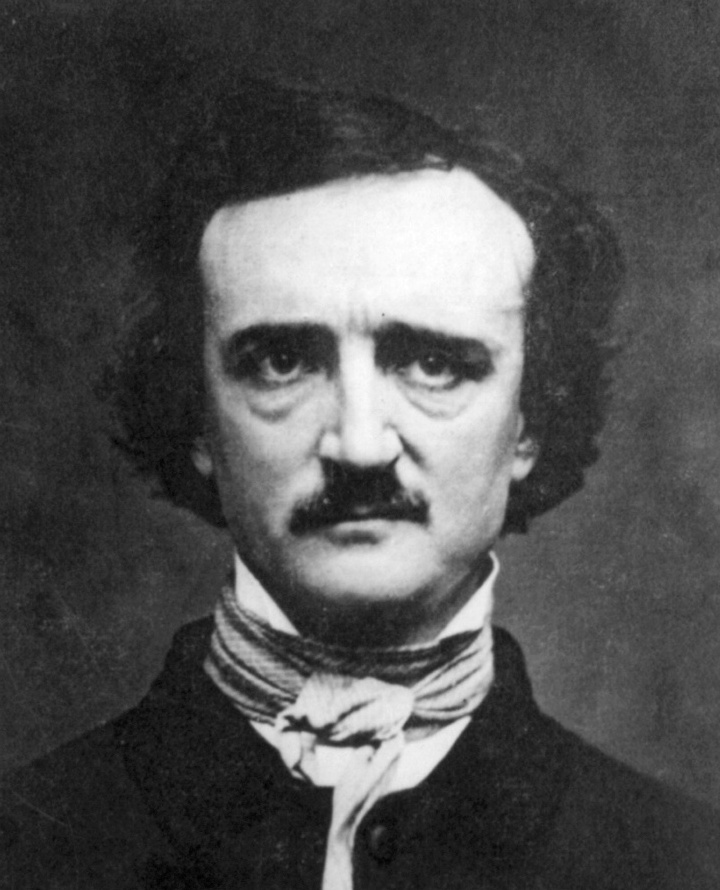
Spirits of the Dead was based on the work of Edgar Allan Poe, shown here at age 39 in an 1848 daguerreotype.

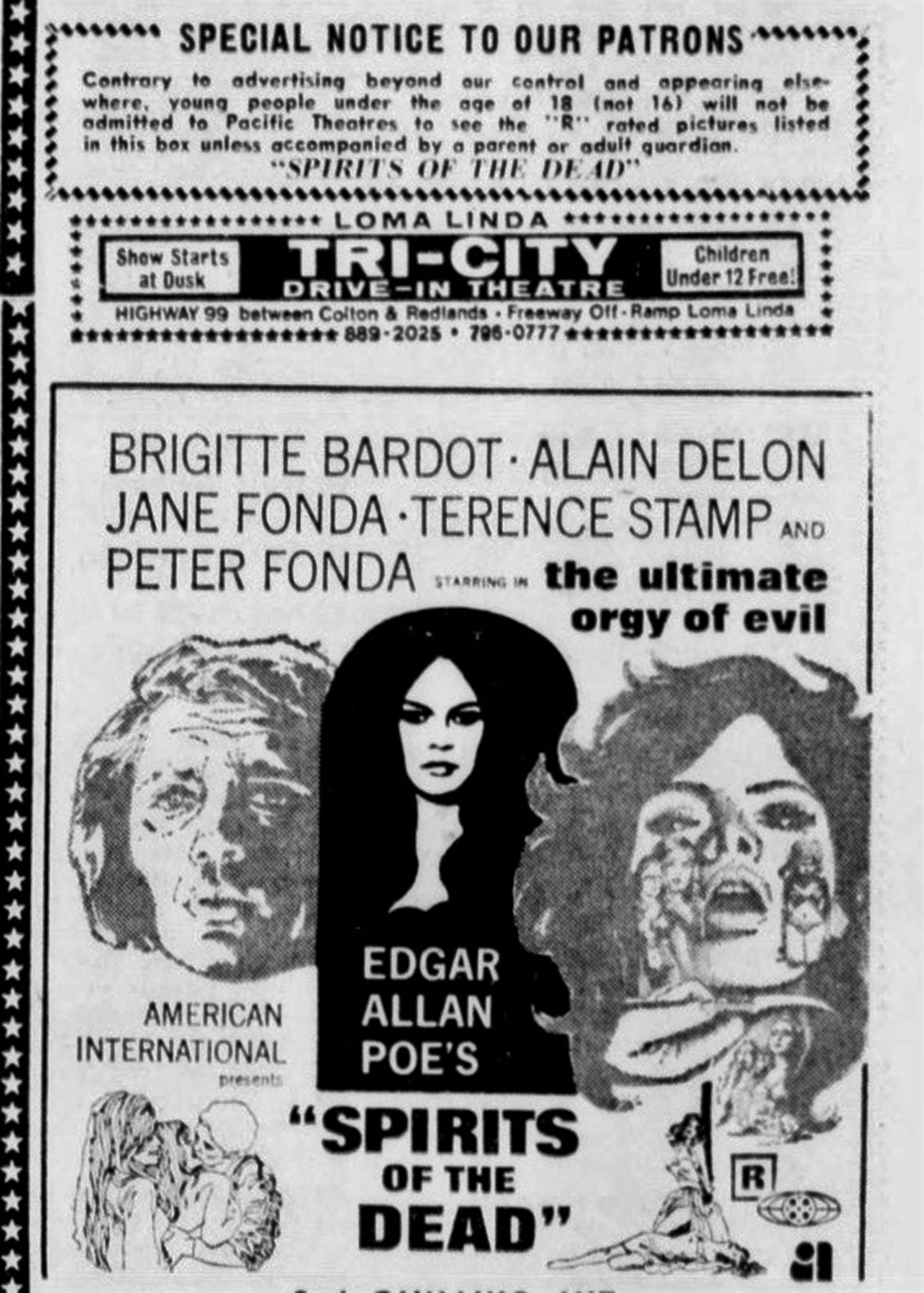
Drive-in advertisement from 1969

=== Development ===
Omnibus films were popular in Europe in the 1960s so producers Alberto Grimaldi and Raymond Eger developed the idea of film anthology influenced by the work of Edgar Allan Poe.

Initial directors announced to work on the film included Luchino Visconti, Claude Chabrol, Joseph Losey and Orson Welles. Orson Welles would direct one segment based on both "Masque of the Red Death" and "The Cask of Amontillado". Welles withdrew in September 1967 and was replaced by Fellini. The script, written in English by Welles and Oja Kodar, is in the Filmmuseum München collection. The final directors involved eventually became Federico Fellini, Roger Vadim and Louis Malle.

=== Production ===
Roger Vadim's segment "Metzengerstein" was filmed just after Vadim had completed shooting on his previous film Barbarella, which also starred Jane Fonda. Scriptwriter and novelist Terry Southern, who had worked on the screenplay for Barbarella, travelled to Rome with Vadim and according to Southern's biographer Lee Hill, it was during the making of this segment that Peter Fonda told Southern of his idea to make a modern Western film. Southern was enthusiastic about the idea and agreed to work on the project, which eventually became the independent film Easy Rider. The segment was filmed in Roscoff, a small town in Brittany.

Louis Malle accepted the job of directing the segment "William Wilson" to raise money for his next film Murmur of the Heart. The financial process of raising money for Murmur took him three years after completing "William Wilson" and in the meantime he shot two documentaries about India. Malle stated that he did not consider his collaboration in Histoires Extraordinaires a very personal one and that he agreed to make some compromises with the producer, Raymond Eger, to make the film more attractive to mainstream spectators. Malle's original conception of the film was closer to Poe's tale than the final result. The most important changes were: casting Brigitte Bardot in the role of Giuseppina with the purpose of adding some erotic touches to the film, the inclusion of the dissection scene, and a somewhat explicit use of violence in some scenes. Malle did not enjoy working with Delon. He wanted Florinda Bolkan for the female lead, but the producers insisted on someone better known, like Bardot. Bardot agreed to make the film; Malle thought she was miscast.

Federico Fellini directed the segment "Toby Dammit" which he wrote with Bernardino Zapponi. Zapponi had a love for gothic literature which can be seen in his short story collection Gobal (1967) where he attempted to re-shape the genre into a contemporary setting. Zapponi's stories caught Fellini's attention. Fellini was particularly interested in C'è una voce nella mia vita ('There is a voice in my life'), which was his first choice in adapting into a film for Spirits of the Dead. The producers were reluctant to have Zapponi's name on the film, so Fellini changed his mind and returned to Poe for inspiration. Fellini considered "The Scythe of Time" and "The Premature Burial", but eventually chose "Never Bet the Devil Your Head". Zapponi and Fellini only used the ending of the story in their adaptation of the material. The film has thematic similarities to three earlier Fellini films. The disintegrating protagonist and the hellish celebrity demimonde he inhabits are reminiscent of both La Dolce Vita and 8½, while the interweaving of dreams and hallucinations into the plotline and the use of highly artificial art direction to reflect inner states resemble similar techniques used in 8½ and Juliet of the Spirits. Fellini rejected Poe's version of the devil, a lame old gentleman with his hair parted in front like a girl’s, and cast a 22 year old Russian woman (Marina Yaru) to play the devil as a young girl. Lending a "pedophiliac slant" to Toby's character, Fellini explained that "a man with a black cape and a beard was the wrong kind of devil for a drugged, hipped actor. His devil must be his own immaturity, hence, a child."

== Release ==
Spirits of the Dead opened in Paris in June 1968. Spirits of the Dead was released in Italy on 12 September 1968 in Italy where the film was distributed by P.E.A. It grossed a total of 512 million Italian lira on its domestic release in Italy.

Samuel Z. Arkoff offered the producers $200,000 for American International Pictures to have the US and Canadian rights, but was knocked back as Arkoff wanted to cut a scene from the Fellini sequence. A year later the producers had not been able to find another buyer so when Arkoff made the same offer they took it. The film was released in the United States on July 23, 1969.

== Critical reception ==
The film received mixed critical reception, with the Fellini segment widely regarded as the best of the three. Reviewing the picture under its English language title Spirits of the Dead, Vincent Canby of The New York Times wrote that "Toby Dammit, the first new Fellini to be seen here since Juliet of the Spirits in 1965, is marvelous: a short movie but a major one. The Vadim is as over decorated and shrill as a drag ball, but still quite fun, and the Malle, based on one of Poe's best stories, is simply tedious."

Review aggregator Rotten Tomatoes reports that 86% of 22 critic reviews are positive for the film; the website's consensus reads, "Three auteurs descend on the works of Poe, each putting on a ghoulish show – adapting The Tomahawk Man's tales of dreams and fright, with Fellini's segment particularly out of sight."
