= Fellini: A Director's Notebook =

- Directed by: Federico Fellini
- Screenplay by: Federico Fellini; Bernardino Zapponi English dialogue by Eugene Walter
- Story by: Federico Fellini
- Produced by: NBC Productions Int'l; Peter Goldfarb
- Starring: Giulietta Masina; Marcello Mastroianni; Caterina Boratto; David Maumsell
- Cinematography: Pasquale de Santis
- Edited by: Ruggero Mastroianni
- Music by: Nino Rota
- Release date: 11 April 1969
- Running time: 54 minutes
- Countries: United States; Italy
- Language: English

Fellini: A Director's Notebook (Italian: Bloc-notes di un regista) is an Italian documentary for television directed by Federico Fellini shot in 16mm and first broadcast in the United States on NBC in 1969, on NBC Experiment in Television.

== Plot ==
Commissioned by NBC television producer Peter Goldfarb in 1968 to do an hour-long program on his work, Fellini filmed a "sort of semihumourous introduction" to past and future plans: the recently abandoned project, The Voyage of G. Mastorna, and his latest work-in-progress, Fellini Satyricon.

== Cast ==
- Federico Fellini as himself
- Giulietta Masina as herself
- Marcello Mastroianni as himself
- Caterina Boratto as herself
- Marina Boratto as Script girl
- Genius the Medium as himself
- David Maumsell as the Archaeology professor

== Home media ==
This film is released in home media as part of Criterion Collection's Essential Fellini box.
