= A Coney Island of the Mind =

Poetry collection by Lawrence Ferlinghetti

- First edition and current cover
- Author: Lawrence Ferlinghetti
- Cover artist: Rudolphe de Harak/Bettman Archive
- Language: English
- Genre: Beat
- Published: 1958 (New Directions)
- Publication place: U.S.
- Pages: 93
- ISBN: 978-0-8112-0041-7
- OCLC: 284358

A Coney Island of the Mind is a collection of poetry by Lawrence Ferlinghetti originally published in 1958. It contains some of Ferlinghetti's most famous poems, such as “I Am Waiting” and “Junkman's Obbligato”, which were created for jazz accompaniment. There are approximately a million copies in print of A Coney Island, and the book has been translated into over a dozen languages. It remains one of the best-selling and most popular books of poetry ever published. Because some of the material had been previously published, the first edition of Coney Island bears both a 1955 and a 1958 copyright.

Coney Island was written in the conservative post-war 1950s, and the poems “resonate ... with a joyful anti-establishment fervor”.

In 1967, a presentation of A Coney Island of the Mind was broadcast on NBC Experiment in Television.

In 2008, New Directions published a Special 50th Anniversary Edition with a CD of the author reading his work.

The phrase "Coney Island of the mind" first appeared in Black Spring by Henry Miller, in the phrase: "Everything is sordid, shoddy, thin as pasteboard. A Coney Island of the mind. The amusement shacks are running full blast, ...".
