= Roma (1972 film) =

1972 film by Federico Fellini

- Theatrical release poster
- Directed by: Federico Fellini
- Screenplay by: Federico Fellini; Bernardino Zapponi
- Story by: Federico Fellini; Bernardino Zapponi
- Produced by: Turi Vasile
- Starring: Peter Gonzales
- Cinematography: Giuseppe Rotunno
- Edited by: Ruggero Mastroianni
- Music by: Nino Rota
- Production companies: Ultra Film; Les Productions Artistes Associés
- Distributed by: Ital-Noleggio Cinematografico (Italy); Les Artistes Associés (France)
- Release dates: 16 March 1972 (Italy); 17 May 1972 (France)
- Running time: 128 minutes
- Countries: Italy; France
- Languages: Italian; German; English; French; Latin; Spanish
- Budget: over $3 million
- Box office: ITL869.9 million

Roma (also known as Fellini's Roma or Federico Fellini's Roma) is a 1972 semi-autobiographical comedy-drama film depicting director Federico Fellini's move from his native Rimini to Rome as a youth. The film was directed by Fellini from a screenplay by himself and Bernardino Zapponi. It is a homage to the city, shown in a series of loosely connected episodes set during both Rome's past and present. The plot is minimal, and the only "character" to develop significantly is Rome herself. Peter Gonzales plays the young Fellini, and the film features mainly newcomers in the cast.

== Plot ==
Federico Fellini recounts his youth in Rome. The film opens up with a long traffic jam to the city. Once there, scenes are shown depicting Rome during the Fascist regime in the 1930s as well as in the 1970s.

A young Fellini moves into a vivacious guesthouse inhabited by unusual people (including a Benito Mussolini lookalike) and run by a sick obese woman. He visits two brothels—one being dilapidated and overcrowded and the other one more stylish and luxurious—and seemingly falls in love with a prostitute working in the latter one. Other attractions in Rome are shown, including a cheap vaudeville theatre, streets, tunnels, and an ancient catacomb with frescos that get ruined by fresh air soon after the excavators discover it. One memorable scene in the vaudeville theatre captures an irate patron swinging a dead cat up onto the stage, in protest.

The most famous scene depicts an elderly solitary noblewoman holding an extravagant liturgical fashion show for a Cardinal and other guests with priests and nuns parading in all kinds of bizarre costumes. The film eventually concludes with a group of young motorcyclists riding into the city and a melancholic shot of actress Anna Magnani, whom the film crew met in the street during shooting and who would die some months afterwards.

== Cast ==
- Peter Gonzales as Federico Fellini (age 18)
  - Stefano Mayore as Federico Fellini (child)
- Fiona Florence as Dolores, a young prostitute
- Britta Barnes
- Pia De Doses as Princess Domitilla
- Marne Maitland as guide in the catacombs
- Renato Giovannoli as Cardinal Ottaviani
- Elisa Mainardi as pharmacist's wife / cinema spectator
- Raout Paule
- Galliano Sbarra as music hall compère
- Paola Natale
- Ginette Marcelle Bron
- Mario Del Vago as widowers' member at teatrino
- Alfredo Adami as widowers' member at teatrino

Uncredited

- Dennis Christopher as hippie
- Anna Magnani as herself
- Marcello Mastroianni as himself
- Feodor Chaliapin Jr. as actor playing Julius Caesar
- Alberto Sordi as himself
- Gore Vidal as himself
- John Francis Lane as himself
- Elliott Murphy as extra
- Federico Fellini as himself
- Cassandra Peterson

== Historical contrasts and modern alienation ==
Fellini repeatedly contrasts Roman life during wartime Fascist Italy with life in the early 1970s. The wartime scenes emphasize the congregation of neighbors in Rome's public places, such as street restaurants, a variety show, and a bomb shelter. With the exception of hippies and a conversational scene with Fellini bemoaning the loss of Roman life with radical students, the analogous congregations of the 1970s are between automobiles and motorcycles. Fellini makes a comparison between the parade of prostitutes at wartime brothels and a fantasy runway fashion show featuring clerical garb and a papal audience.

== Narrative devices ==
The plot (such as it is) centers on two journeys to Rome by the director. The first is as a young man in the late 1930s and early 1940s. The second is as the director of a film crew creating a film about Rome. The film alternates between these two narratives.

== Deleted scene ==
During editing, a scene with Alberto Sordi was cut because it was considered too immoral and cruel. Sordi played a rich man sitting at a bar watching some poor children playing ball. A poor man, blind, sick and lame, comes to cross the street, preventing the rich man from viewing the scene. Alberto Sordi, annoyed, begins shouting insults at the blind man: "Get out of the way, you ugly old man! Get out!".

== Release ==
The film was screened at the 1972 Cannes Film Festival but was not entered into the main competition. The film was also selected as the Italian entry for the Best Foreign Language Film at the 45th Academy Awards but was not accepted as a nominee. The film is currently available on DVD and Blu-ray through The Criterion Collection.

== Reception ==
=== Critical response ===
On the review aggregator website Rotten Tomatoes, Roma holds an approval rating of 67% based on 19 reviews, with an average score of 6.6/10.

Roger Ebert of the Chicago Sun-Times gave the film four stars out of four; praising Fellini's direction in the film he wrote, "Fellini isn't just giving us a lot of flashy scenes, he's building a narrative that has a city for its protagonist instead of a single character." Ebert ranked the film 9th in his 10 Best Films of 1972 list.

=== Accolades ===
- 1972 Cannes Film Festival, Technical Grand Prize (Grand Prix de la Commission Supérieure Technique), won (ex-aequo)
- 27th British Academy Film Awards (BAFTA), Best Production Design for Danilo Donati, nominated
- 30th Golden Globe Awards, Best Foreign Language Film, nominated

== See also ==
- List of submissions to the 45th Academy Awards for Best Foreign Language Film
- List of Italian submissions for the Academy Award for Best Foreign Language Film
