= Pierluigi Praturlon =

Italian photographer

Pierluigi Praturlon (1924–1999) was an Italian set photographer, known particularly for his work with film director Federico Fellini.

Praturlon was born in Rome.

He was the official set photographer on more than 400 films, including Ben Hur, Cleopatra, La grande guerra, Thunderball, Grand Prix, La Dolce Vita, The Pink Panther, Matrimonio all’italiana, Amarcord, and La Ciociara.

Praturlon was Sophia Loren's personal photographer, and Frank Sinatra consulted him regarding the tapestries in his private jet.

He died in Rome in 1999.
