= Federico Fellini =

Italian filmmaker (1920–1993)

Federico Fellini OMRI
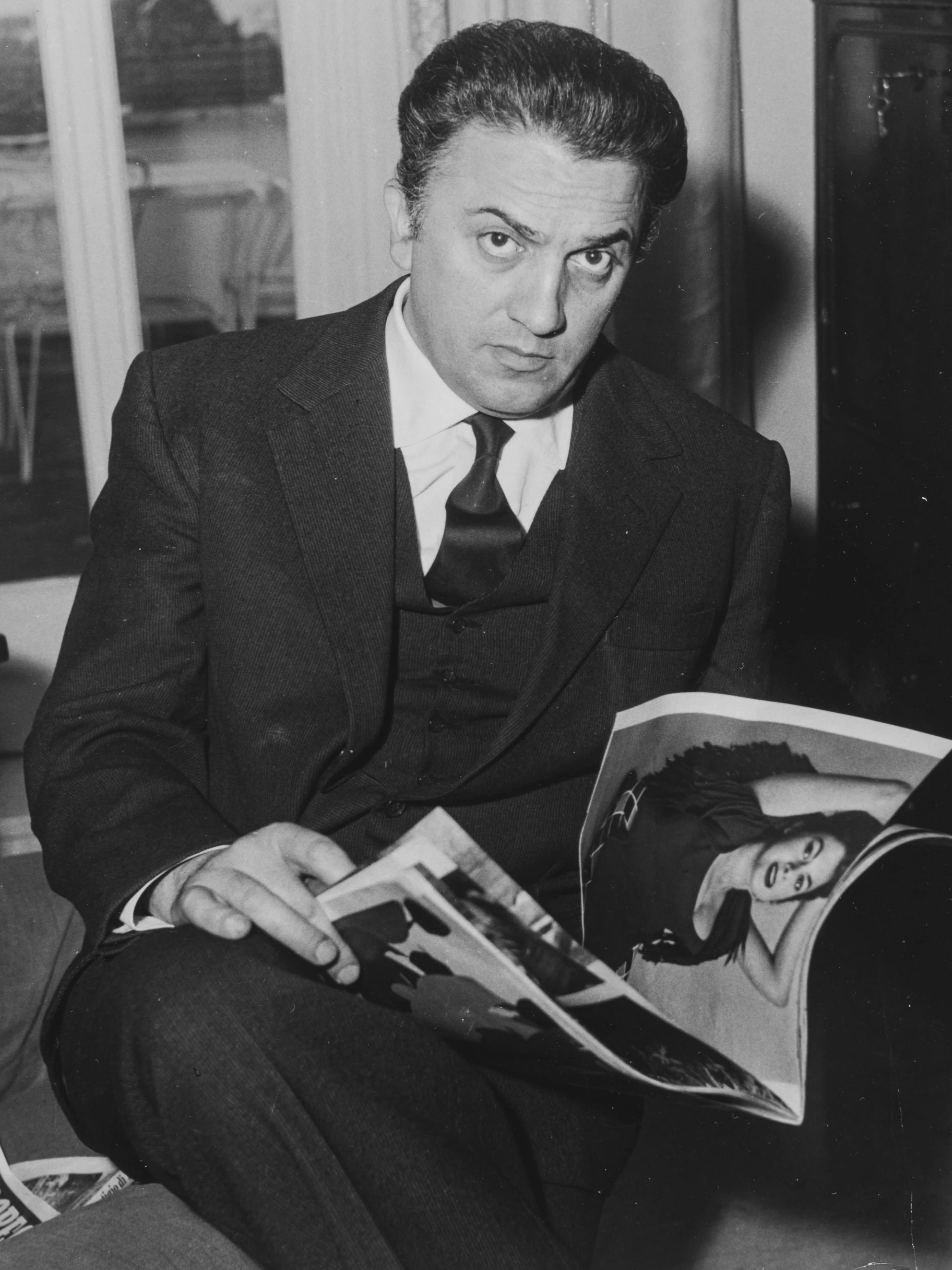
- Fellini in 1960
- Born: 20 January 1920; Rimini, Italy
- Died: 31 October 1993 (aged 73); Rome, Italy
- Burial place: Monumental Cemetery of Rimini, Italy
- Occupations: Film director; screenwriter
- Years active: 1945–1993
- Spouse: Giulietta Masina (m. 1943)

Federico Fellini (Italian: [fedeˈriːko felˈliːni]; 20 January 1920 – 31 October 1993) was an Italian film director and screenwriter known for his distinctive style that blends fantasy and baroque images with earthiness. Recognized as one of the greatest and most influential filmmakers of all time, his films rank highly in critical polls such as those of Cahiers du Cinéma and Sight & Sound, which lists his 1963 film 8½ as the 10th-greatest film of all time.

Fellini's best-known films include I Vitelloni (1953), La Strada (1954), Nights of Cabiria (1957), La Dolce Vita (1960), 8½ (1963), Juliet of the Spirits (1965), the "Toby Dammit" segment of Spirits of the Dead (1968), Fellini Satyricon (1969), Roma (1972), Amarcord (1973), and Fellini's Casanova (1976).

Fellini was nominated for 17 Academy Awards over the course of his career, winning four, all in the Best Foreign Language Film category (a record). He received an honorary statuette for Lifetime Achievement at the 65th Academy Awards in Los Angeles. Fellini also won the Palme d'Or for La Dolce Vita in 1960, two times the Moscow International Film Festival in 1963 and 1987, and the Career Golden Lion at the 42nd Venice International Film Festival in 1985. In Sight & Sound's 2002 list of the greatest directors of all time, Fellini was ranked 2nd in the directors' poll and 7th in the critics' poll.

== Early life and education ==
=== Rimini (1920–1938) ===
Fellini was born on 20 January 1920, to middle-class parents in Rimini, then a small town on the Adriatic Sea. On 25 January, at the San Nicolò church he was baptized Federico Domenico Marcello Fellini. His father, Urbano Fellini (1894–1956), born to a family of Romagnol peasants and small landholders from Gambettola, moved to Rome in 1915 as a baker apprenticed to the Pantanella pasta factory. His mother, Ida Barbiani (1896–1984), came from a bourgeois Catholic family of Roman merchants. Despite her family's vehement disapproval, she eloped with Urbano in 1917 to live at his parents' home in Gambettola. A civil marriage followed in 1918 with the religious ceremony held at Santa Maria Maggiore in Rome a year later.

The couple settled in Rimini, where Urbano became a traveling salesman and wholesale vendor. Fellini had two siblings, Riccardo (1921–1991), a documentary director for RAI Television, and Maria Maddalena (m. Fabbri; 1929–2002).

In 1924, Fellini began primary school at an institute run by the nuns of San Vincenzo in Rimini, later attending the Carlo Tonini public school two years afterward. An attentive student, he spent his leisure time drawing, staging puppet shows and reading Corriere dei Piccoli, the popular children's magazine that reproduced traditional American cartoons by Winsor McCay, George McManus and Frederick Burr Opper. (Opper's Happy Hooligan would provide the visual inspiration for Gelsomina in Fellini's 1954 film La Strada; McCay's Little Nemo would directly influence his 1980 film City of Women.) In 1926, he discovered the world of Grand Guignol, the circus with Pierino the Clown and the movies. Guido Brignone's Maciste all'inferno (1925, Maciste in Hell), the first film he saw, would mark him in ways linked to Dante and the cinema throughout his entire career.

Enrolled at the Ginnasio Giulio Cesare in 1929, he made friends with Luigi Titta Benzi, later a prominent Rimini lawyer (and the model for young Titta in Amarcord (1973)). In Mussolini's Italy, Fellini and Riccardo became members of the Avanguardista, the compulsory Fascist youth group for males. He visited Rome with his parents for the first time in 1933, the year of the maiden voyage of the transatlantic ocean liner SS Rex (which is shown in Amarcord). The sea creature found on the beach at the end of La Dolce Vita (1960) has its basis in a giant fish marooned on a Rimini beach during a storm in 1934.

Although Fellini adapted key events from his childhood and adolescence in films such as I Vitelloni (1953), 8 1/2 (1963), and Amarcord (1973), he insisted that such autobiographical memories were inventions:

It is not memory that dominates my films. To say that my films are autobiographical is an overly facile liquidation, a hasty classification. It seems to me that I have invented almost everything: childhood, character, nostalgias, dreams, memories, for the pleasure of being able to recount them.

In 1937, Fellini opened Febo, a portrait shop in Rimini, with the painter Demos Bonini. His first humorous article appeared in the "Postcards to Our Readers" section of Milan's Domenica del Corriere. Deciding on a career as a caricaturist and gag writer, Fellini travelled to Florence in 1938, where he published his first cartoon in the weekly 420. According to a biographer, Fellini found school "exasperating" and, in one year, had 67 absences. Failing his military culture exam, he graduated from high school in 1939.

=== Rome (1939) ===
In September 1939, he enrolled in law school at the Sapienza University of Rome to please his parents. Biographer Hollis Alpert reports that "there is no record of his ever having attended a class". Installed in a family pensione, he met another lifelong friend, the painter Rinaldo Geleng. Desperately poor, they unsuccessfully joined forces to draw sketches of restaurant and café patrons. Fellini eventually found work as a cub reporter on the dailies Il Piccolo and Il Popolo di Roma, but quit after a short stint, bored by the local court news assignments.

Four months after publishing his first article in Marc'Aurelio, the highly influential biweekly humour magazine, he joined the editorial board, achieving success with a regular column titled But Are You Listening?. Described as "the determining moment in Fellini's life", the magazine gave him steady employment between 1939 and 1942, when he interacted with writers, gagmen, and scriptwriters. These encounters eventually led to opportunities in show business and cinema. Among his collaborators on the magazine's editorial board were the future director Ettore Scola, Marxist theorist and scriptwriter Cesare Zavattini, and Bernardino Zapponi, a future Fellini screenwriter. Conducting interviews for CineMagazzino also proved congenial: when asked to interview Aldo Fabrizi, Italy's most popular variety performer, he established such immediate personal rapport with the man that they collaborated professionally. Specializing in humorous monologues, Fabrizi commissioned material from his young protégé.

== Career and later life ==
=== Early screenplays (1940–1943) ===
Retained on business in Rimini, Urbano sent his wife and family to Rome in 1940 to share an apartment with his son. Fellini and Ruggero Maccari, also on the staff of Marc'Aurelio, began writing radio sketches and gags for films.

Not yet twenty and with Fabrizi's help, Fellini obtained his first screen credit as a comedy writer on Mario Mattoli's Il pirata sono io (The Pirate's Dream). Progressing rapidly to numerous collaborations on films at Cinecittà, his circle of professional acquaintances widened to include novelist Vitaliano Brancati and scriptwriter Piero Tellini. In the wake of Mussolini's declaration of war against France and Britain on 10 June 1940, Fellini discovered Kafka's The Metamorphosis, Gogol, John Steinbeck and William Faulkner along with French films by Marcel Carné, René Clair, and Julien Duvivier. In 1941 he published Il mio amico Pasqualino, a 74-page booklet in ten chapters describing the absurd adventures of Pasqualino, an alter ego.

Writing for radio while attempting to avoid the draft, Fellini met his future wife Giulietta Masina in a studio office at the Italian public radio broadcaster EIAR in the autumn of 1942. Well-paid as the voice of Pallina in Fellini's radio serial, Cico and Pallina, Masina was also well known for her musical-comedy broadcasts which cheered an audience depressed by the war.

Giulietta is practical, and likes the fact that she earns a handsome fee for her radio work, whereas theater never pays well. And of course the fame counts for something too. Radio is a booming business and comedy reviews have a broad and devoted public.

In November 1942, Fellini was sent to Libya, occupied by Fascist Italy, to work on the screenplay of I cavalieri del deserto (Knights of the Desert, 1942), directed by Osvaldo Valenti and Gino Talamo. Fellini welcomed the assignment as it allowed him "to secure another extension on his draft order". Responsible for emergency re-writing, he also directed the film's first scenes. When Tripoli fell under siege by British forces, he and his colleagues made a narrow escape by boarding a German military plane flying to Sicily. His African adventure, later published in Marc'Aurelio as "The First Flight", marked "the emergence of a new Fellini, no longer just a screenwriter, working and sketching at his desk, but a filmmaker out in the field".

The apolitical Fellini was finally freed of the draft when an Allied air raid over Bologna destroyed his medical records. Fellini and Giulietta hid in her aunt's apartment until Mussolini's fall on 25 July 1943. After dating for nine months, the couple were married on 30 October 1943. Several months later, Masina fell down the stairs and suffered a miscarriage. She gave birth to a son, Pierfederico, on 22 March 1945, but the child died of encephalitis 11 days later on 2 April 1945. Masina and Fellini had no other children. The tragedy had enduring emotional and artistic repercussions.

=== Neorealist apprenticeship (1944–1949) ===
After the Allied liberation of Rome on 4 June 1944, Fellini and Enrico De Seta opened the Funny Face Shop where they survived the postwar recession drawing caricatures of American soldiers. He became involved with Italian Neorealism when Roberto Rossellini, at work on Stories of Yesteryear (later Rome, Open City), met Fellini in his shop, and proposed he contribute gags and dialogue for the script. Aware of Fellini's reputation as Aldo Fabrizi's "creative muse", Rossellini also requested that he try to convince the actor to play the role of Father Giuseppe Morosini, the parish priest executed by the SS on 4 April 1944.

In 1947, Fellini and Sergio Amidei received an Oscar nomination for the screenplay of Rome, Open City.

Working as both screenwriter and assistant director on Rossellini's Paisà (Paisan) in 1946, Fellini was entrusted to film the Sicilian scenes in Maiori. In February 1948, he was introduced to Marcello Mastroianni, then a young theatre actor appearing in a play with Giulietta Masina. Establishing a close working relationship with Alberto Lattuada, Fellini co-wrote the director's Senza pietà (Without Pity) and Il mulino del Po (The Mill on the Po). Fellini also worked with Rossellini on the anthology film L'Amore (1948), co-writing the screenplay and in one segment titled, "The Miracle", acting opposite Anna Magnani. To play the role of a vagabond rogue mistaken by Magnani for a saint, Fellini had to bleach his black hair blond.

=== Early films (1950–1953) ===
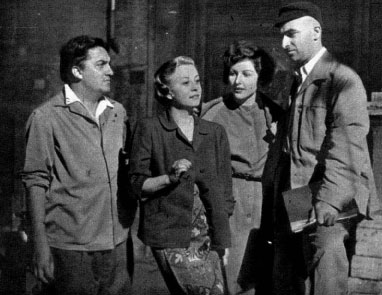
Fellini, Masina, Carla del Poggio and Alberto Lattuada, 1952

Fellini's early works had a "forlorn atmosphere and touch of melancholy."

In 1950 Fellini co-produced and co-directed with Alberto Lattuada Variety Lights (Luci del varietà), his first feature film. A backstage comedy set among the world of small-time travelling performers, it featured Giulietta Masina and Lattuada's wife, Carla Del Poggio. Its release to poor reviews and limited distribution proved disastrous for all concerned. The production company went bankrupt, leaving both Fellini and Lattuada with debts to pay for over a decade. In February 1950, Paisà received an Oscar nomination for the screenplay by Rossellini, Sergio Amidei, and Fellini.

After travelling to Paris for a script conference with Rossellini on Europa '51, Fellini began production on The White Sheik in September 1951, his first solo-directed feature. Starring Alberto Sordi in the title role, the film is a revised version of a treatment first written by Michelangelo Antonioni in 1949 and based on the fotoromanzi, the photographed cartoon strip romances popular in Italy at the time. Producer Carlo Ponti commissioned Fellini and Tullio Pinelli to write the script but Antonioni rejected the story they developed. With Ennio Flaiano, they re-worked the material into a light-hearted satire about newlywed couple Ivan and Wanda Cavalli (Leopoldo Trieste, Brunella Bovo) in Rome to visit the Pope. Ivan's prissy mask of respectability is soon demolished by his wife's obsession with the White Sheik. Highlighting the music of Nino Rota, the film was selected at Cannes (among the films in competition was Orson Welles's Othello) and then retracted. Screened at the 13th Venice International Film Festival, it was razzed by critics in "the atmosphere of a soccer match". One reviewer declared that Fellini had "not the slightest aptitude for cinema direction".

In 1953, I Vitelloni found favour with the critics and public. Winning the Silver Lion Award in Venice, it secured Fellini his first international distributor.

=== Beyond neorealism (1954–1960) ===
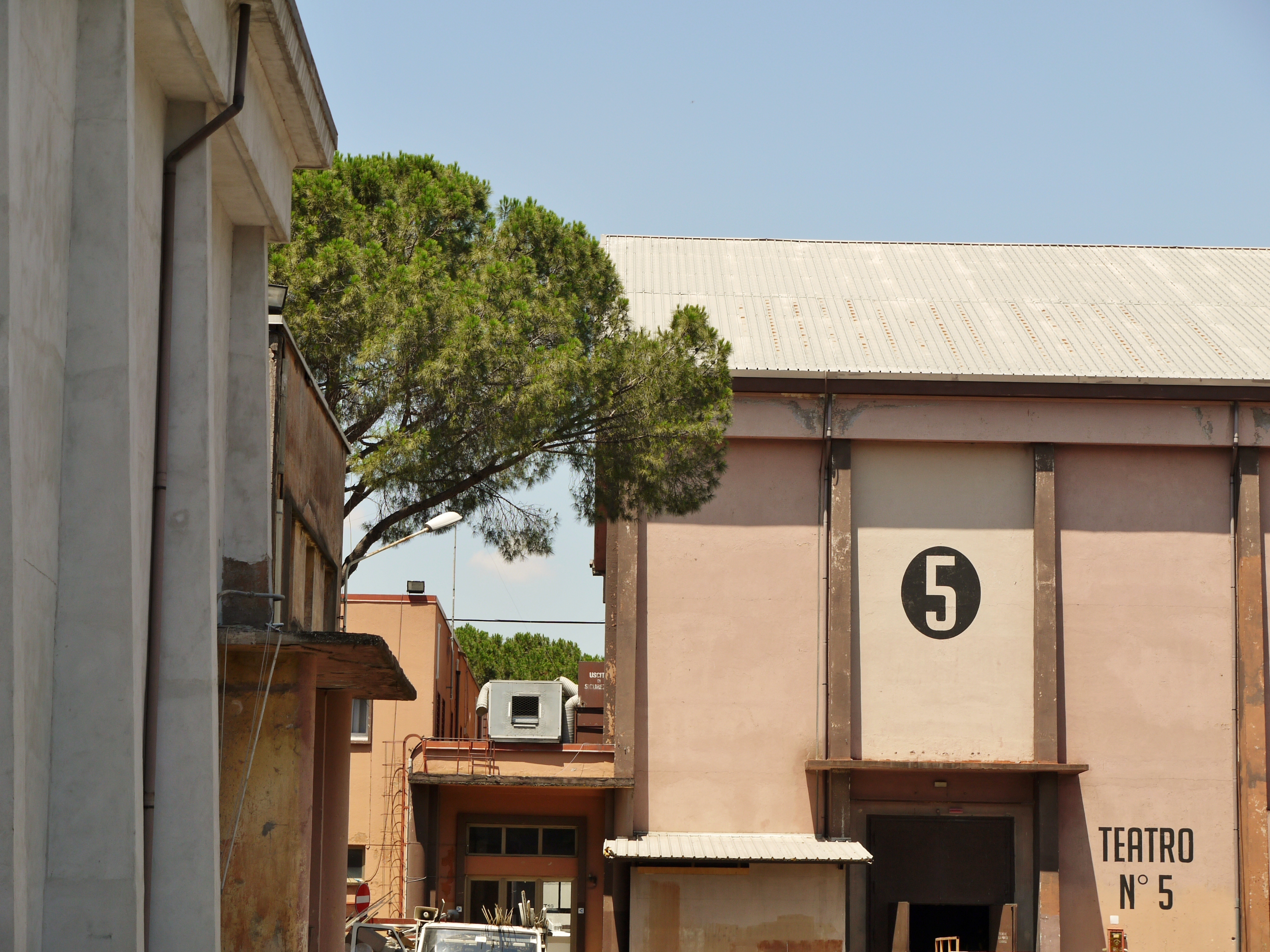
Cinecittà – Teatro 5, Fellini's favorite studio

Fellini directed La Strada based on a script completed in 1952 with Pinelli and Flaiano. It starred his wife Giulietta Masina, Anthony Quinn, and Richard Basehart. During the last three weeks of shooting, Fellini experienced the first signs of severe clinical depression. Aided by his wife, he undertook a brief period of therapy with Freudian psychoanalyst Emilio Servadio.

Fellini cast American actor Broderick Crawford to interpret the role of an aging swindler in Il Bidone. Based partly on stories told to him by a petty thief during production of La Strada, Fellini developed the script into a con man's slow descent. To incarnate the role's "intense, tragic face", Fellini's first choice had been Humphrey Bogart, but after learning of the actor's lung cancer, chose Crawford after seeing his face on the theatrical poster of All the King's Men (1949). The film shoot was wrought with difficulties stemming from Crawford's alcoholism. Savaged by critics at the 16th Venice International Film Festival, the film did miserably at the box office and did not receive international distribution until 1964.

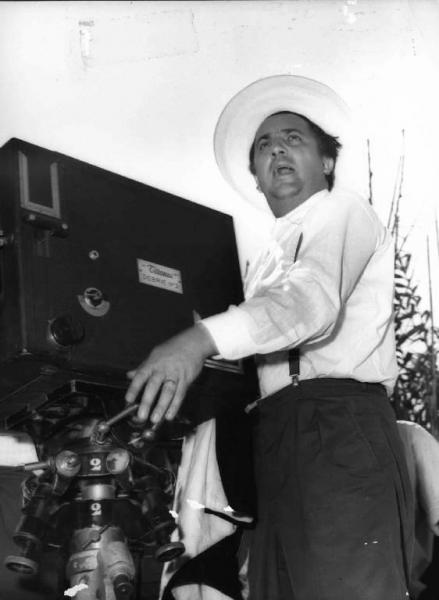
Federico Fellini on the set of Il Bidone, 1955.

During the autumn, Fellini researched and developed a treatment based on a film adaptation of Mario Tobino's novel, The Free Women of Magliano. Set in a mental institution for women, the project was abandoned when financial backers considered the subject had no potential. While preparing Nights of Cabiria in spring 1956, Fellini learned of his father's death by cardiac arrest at the age of sixty-two. Produced by Dino De Laurentiis and starring Giulietta Masina, the film took its inspiration from news reports of a woman's severed head retrieved in a lake and stories by Wanda, a shantytown prostitute Fellini met on the set of Il Bidone. Pier Paolo Pasolini was hired to translate Flaiano and Pinelli's dialogue into Roman dialect and to supervise researches in the vice-afflicted suburbs of Rome. The movie won the Academy Award for Best Foreign Language Film at the 30th Academy Awards and brought Masina the Best Actress Award at Cannes for her performance.

With Pinelli, he developed Journey with Anita for Sophia Loren and Gregory Peck. An "invention born out of intimate truth", the script was based on Fellini's return to Rimini with a mistress to attend his father's funeral. Due to Loren's unavailability, the project was shelved and resurrected twenty-five years later as Lovers and Liars (1981), a comedy directed by Mario Monicelli with Goldie Hawn and Giancarlo Giannini. For Eduardo De Filippo, he co-wrote the script of Fortunella.

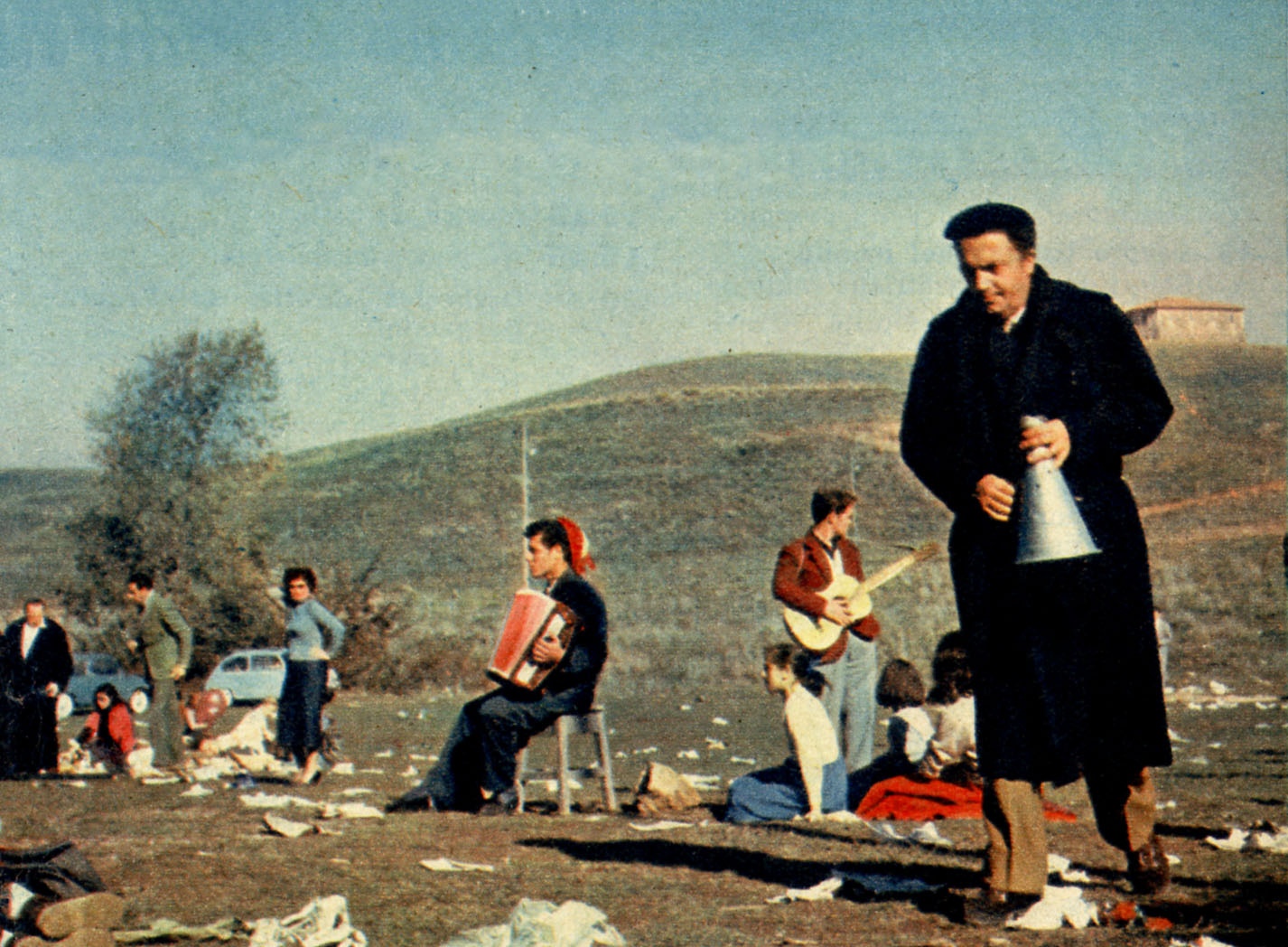
Fellini during the filming of Nights of Cabiria, 1956

The Hollywood on the Tiber phenomenon of 1958 in which American studios profited from the cheap studio labour available in Rome provided the backdrop for photojournalists to steal shots of celebrities on the via Veneto. The scandal provoked by Turkish dancer Nana Kaish's improvised striptease at a nightclub captured Fellini's imagination: he decided to end his latest script-in-progress, Moraldo in the City, with an all-night "orgy" at a seaside villa. Pierluigi Praturlon's photos of Anita Ekberg after an evening spent with the actress in a Rome night club provided further inspiration for Fellini and his screenwriters.

Changing the title of the screenplay to La Dolce Vita, Fellini soon clashed with his producer on casting: The director insisted on the relatively unknown Mastroianni while De Laurentiis wanted Paul Newman as a hedge on his investment. Reaching an impasse, De Laurentiis sold the rights to publishing mogul Angelo Rizzoli. Shooting began on 16 March 1959 with Anita Ekberg climbing the stairs to the cupola of Saint Peter's in a mammoth décor constructed at Cinecittà. The statue of Christ flown by helicopter over Rome to St. Peter's Square was inspired by an actual media event on 1 May 1956, which Fellini had witnessed.

La Dolce Vita broke all box office records. Despite scalpers selling tickets at 1000 lire, crowds queued in line for hours to see an "immoral movie" before the censors banned it. At an exclusive Milan screening on 5 February 1960, one outraged patron spat on Fellini while others hurled insults. Denounced in parliament by right-wing conservatives, undersecretary Domenico Magrì of the Christian Democrats demanded tolerance for the film's controversial themes. The Vatican's official press organ, L'Osservatore Romano, lobbied for censorship while the Board of Roman Parish Priests and the Genealogical Board of Italian Nobility attacked the film. In one documented instance involving favourable reviews written by the Jesuits of San Fedele, defending La Dolce Vita had severe consequences. In competition at Cannes alongside Antonioni's L'Avventura, the film won the Palme d'Or awarded by presiding juror Georges Simenon. The Belgian writer was promptly "hissed at" by the disapproving festival crowd.

=== Art films and dreams (1961–1969) ===
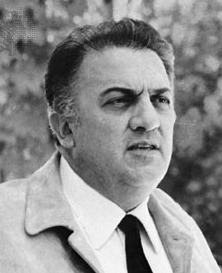
Federico Fellini

A major discovery for Fellini after his Italian neorealism period (1950–1959) was the work of Carl Jung. After meeting Jungian psychoanalyst Dr. Ernst Bernhard in early 1960, he read Jung's autobiography, Memories, Dreams, Reflections (1963) and experimented with LSD. Bernhard also recommended that Fellini consult the I Ching and keep a record of his dreams. What Fellini formerly accepted as "his extrasensory perceptions" were now interpreted as psychic manifestations of the unconscious. Bernhard's focus on Jungian depth psychology proved to be the single greatest influence on Fellini's mature style and marked the turning point in his work from neorealism to filmmaking that was "primarily oneiric". As a consequence, Jung's seminal ideas on the anima and the animus, the role of archetypes and the collective unconscious directly influenced such films as 8 1/2 (1963), Juliet of the Spirits (1965), Fellini Satyricon (1969), Casanova (1976), and City of Women (1980). Other key influences on his work include Luis Buñuel, (Note: Fellini & Pettigrew 2003, p. 87. Buñuel is the auteur I feel closest to in terms of an idea of cinema or the tendency to make particular kinds of films.) Charlie Chaplin, (Note: Stubbs 2006, pp. 152–153. One of Cabiria's finest moments comes in the movie's nightclub scene. It begins when the actor's girlfriend deserts him, and the star picks up Cabiria on the street as a replacement. He whisks her away to the nightclub. Fellini has admitted that this scene owes a debt to Chaplin's City Lights (1931). Peter Bondanella points out that Gelsomina's costume, makeup, and antics as a clown figure had "clear links to Fellini's past as a cartoonist-imitator of Happy Hooligan and Charlie Chaplin.) Sergei Eisenstein, (Note: Bondanella 1978, p. 167. In his study of Fellini Satyricon, Italian novelist Alberto Moravia observes that with "the oars of his galleys suspended in the air, Fellini revives for us the lances of the battle in Eisenstein's Alexander Nevsky (film).) Buster Keaton, Laurel and Hardy, the Marx Brothers, and Roberto Rossellini. (Note: Fellini & Pettigrew 2003, pp. 17–18. Roberto Rossellini walked into my life at a moment when I needed to make a choice, when I needed someone to show me the path to follow. He was the stationmaster, the green light of providence... He taught me how to thrive on chaos by ignoring it and focusing on what was essential: constructing your film day by day. In Fellini on Fellini, the director explains that his "meeting with Rossellini was a determining factor... he taught me to make a film as if I were going for a picnic with friends".)

Exploiting La Dolce Vita's success, financier Angelo Rizzoli set up Federiz in 1960, an independent film company, for Fellini and production manager Clemente Fracassi to discover and produce new talent. Despite the best intentions, their overcautious editorial and business skills forced the company to close down soon after cancelling Pasolini's project, Accattone (1961).

Condemned as a "public sinner", for La Dolce Vita, Fellini responded with The Temptations of Doctor Antonio, a segment in the omnibus Boccaccio '70. His second colour film, it was the sole project green-lighted at Federiz. Infused with the surrealistic satire that characterized the young Fellini's work at Marc'Aurelio, the film ridiculed a crusader against vice, interpreted by Peppino De Filippo, who goes insane trying to censor a billboard of Anita Ekberg espousing the virtues of milk.

In an October 1960 letter to his colleague Brunello Rondi, Fellini first outlined his film ideas about a man suffering creative block: "Well then – a guy (a writer? any kind of professional man? a theatrical producer?) has to interrupt the usual rhythm of his life for two weeks because of a not-too-serious disease. It's a warning bell: something is blocking up his system." Unclear about the script, its title, and his protagonist's profession, he scouted locations throughout Italy "looking for the film", in the hope of resolving his confusion. Flaiano suggested La bella confusione (literally The Beautiful Confusion) as the movie's title. Under pressure from his producers, Fellini finally settled on 8 1/2, a self-referential title referring principally (but not exclusively) to the number of films he had directed up to that time.

Giving the order to start production in spring 1962, Fellini signed deals with his producer Rizzoli, fixed dates, had sets constructed, cast Mastroianni, Anouk Aimée, and Sandra Milo in lead roles, and did screen tests at the Scalera Studios in Rome. He hired cinematographer Gianni Di Venanzo, among key personnel. But apart from naming his hero Guido Anselmi, he still couldn't decide what his character did for a living. The crisis came to a head in April when, sitting in his Cinecittà office, he began a letter to Rizzoli confessing he had "lost his film" and had to abandon the project. Interrupted by the chief machinist requesting he celebrate the launch of 8 1/2, Fellini put aside the letter and went on the set. Raising a toast to the crew, he "felt overwhelmed by shame… I was in a no exit situation. I was a director who wanted to make a film he no longer remembers. And lo and behold, at that very moment everything fell into place. I got straight to the heart of the film. I would narrate everything that had been happening to me. I would make a film telling the story of a director who no longer knows what film he wanted to make". The self-mirroring structure makes the entire film inseparable from its reflecting construction.

Shooting began on 9 May 1962. Perplexed by the seemingly chaotic, incessant improvisation on the set, Deena Boyer, the director's American press officer at the time, asked for a rationale. Fellini told her that he hoped to convey the three levels "on which our minds live: the past, the present, and the conditional — the realm of fantasy". After shooting wrapped on 14 October, Nino Rota composed various circus marches and fanfares that would later become signature tunes of the maestro's cinema. Nominated for four Oscars, 8 1/2 won awards for best foreign language film and best costume design in black-and-white. In California for the ceremony, Fellini toured Disneyland with Walt Disney the day after.

Increasingly attracted to parapsychology, Fellini met the Turin antiquarian Gustavo Rol in 1963. Rol, a former banker, introduced him to the world of Spiritism and séances. In 1964, Fellini took LSD under the supervision of Emilio Servadio, his psychoanalyst during the 1954 production of La Strada. For years reserved about what actually occurred that Sunday afternoon, he admitted in 1992 that

... objects and their functions no longer had any significance. All I perceived was perception itself, the hell of forms and figures devoid of human emotion and detached from the reality of my unreal environment. I was an instrument in a virtual world that constantly renewed its own meaningless image in a living world that was itself perceived outside of nature. And since the appearance of things was no longer definitive but limitless, this paradisiacal awareness freed me from the reality external to my self. The fire and the rose, as it were, became one.

Fellini's hallucinatory insights were given full flower in his first colour feature Juliet of the Spirits (1965), depicting Giulietta Masina as Juliet, a housewife who rightly suspects her husband's infidelity and succumbs to the voices of spirits summoned during a séance at her home. Her sexually voracious next-door neighbor Suzy (Sandra Milo) introduces Juliet to a world of uninhibited sensuality, but Juliet is haunted by childhood memories of her Catholic guilt and a teenaged friend who committed suicide. Complex and filled with psychological symbolism, the film is set to a jaunty score by Nino Rota.

=== Nostalgia, sexuality, and politics (1970–1980) ===
To help promote Satyricon in the United States, Fellini flew to Los Angeles in January 1970 for interviews with Dick Cavett and David Frost. He also met with film director Paul Mazursky who wanted to cast him in a starring role alongside Donald Sutherland in his new film, Alex in Wonderland. In February, Fellini scouted locations in Paris for The Clowns, a docufiction both for cinema and television, based on his childhood memories of the circus and a "coherent theory of clowning." As he saw it, the clown "was always the caricature of a well-established, ordered, peaceful society. But today all is temporary, disordered, grotesque. Who can still laugh at clowns?... All the world plays a clown now."

In March 1971, Fellini began production on Roma, a seemingly random collection of episodes informed by the director's memories and impressions of Rome. The "diverse sequences," writes Fellini scholar Peter Bondanella, "are held together only by the fact that they all ultimately originate from the director's fertile imagination." The film's opening scene anticipates Amarcord while its most surreal sequence involves an ecclesiastical fashion show in which nuns and priests roller skate past shipwrecks of cobwebbed skeletons.

Over a period of six months between January and June 1973, Fellini shot the Oscar-winning Amarcord. Loosely based on the director's 1968 autobiographical essay My Rimini, the film depicts the adolescent Titta and his friends working out their sexual frustrations against the religious and Fascist backdrop of a provincial town in Italy during the 1930s. Produced by Franco Cristaldi, the seriocomic movie became Fellini's second biggest commercial success after La Dolce Vita. Circular in form, Amarcord avoids plot and linear narrative in a way similar to The Clowns and Roma. The director's overriding concern with developing a poetic form of cinema was first outlined in a 1965 interview he gave to The New Yorker journalist Lillian Ross: "I am trying to free my work from certain constrictions – a story with a beginning, a development, an ending. It should be more like a poem with metre and cadence."

=== Late films and projects (1981–1990) ===
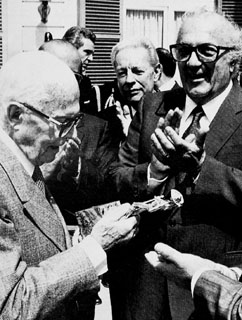
Italian President Sandro Pertini receiving a David di Donatello Award from Fellini in 1985

Organized by his publisher Diogenes Verlag in 1982, the first major exhibition of 63 drawings by Fellini was held in Paris, Brussels, and the Pierre Matisse Gallery in New York. A gifted caricaturist, he found much of the inspiration for his sketches from his own dreams while the films-in-progress both originated from and stimulated drawings for characters, decor, costumes and set designs. Under the title, I disegni di Fellini (Fellini's Designs), he published 350 drawings executed in pencil, watercolours, and felt pens.

On 6 September 1985 Fellini was awarded the Golden Lion for lifetime achievement at the 42nd Venice Film Festival. That same year, he became the first non-American to receive the Film Society of Lincoln Center's annual award for cinematic achievement.

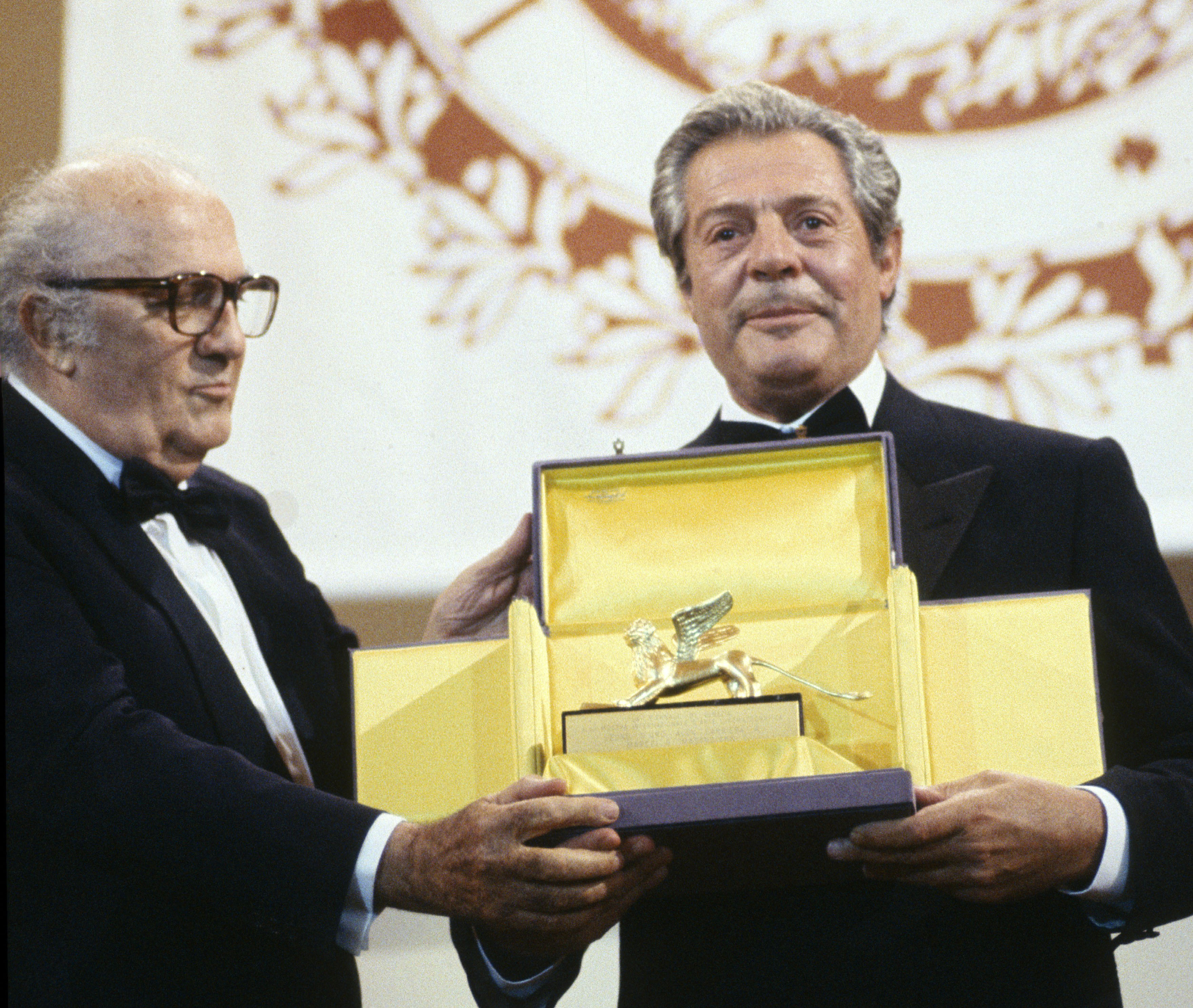
Fellini rewards Marcello Mastroianni with the Golden Lion Honorary Award at the 47th Venice International Film Festival.

Long fascinated by Carlos Castaneda's The Teachings of Don Juan: A Yaqui Way of Knowledge, Fellini accompanied the Peruvian author on a journey to the Yucatán to assess the feasibility of a film. After first meeting Castaneda in Rome in October 1984, Fellini drafted a treatment with Pinelli titled Viaggio a Tulum. Producer Alberto Grimaldi, prepared to buy film rights to all of Castaneda's work, then paid for pre-production research taking Fellini and his entourage from Rome to Los Angeles and the jungles of Mexico in October 1985. When Castaneda inexplicably disappeared and the project fell through, Fellini's mystico-shamanic adventures were scripted with Pinelli and serialized in Corriere della Sera in May 1986. A barely veiled satirical interpretation of Castaneda's work, Viaggio a Tulum was published in 1989 as a graphic novel with artwork by Milo Manara and as Trip to Tulum in America in 1990.

For Intervista, produced by Ibrahim Moussa and RAI Television, Fellini intercut memories of the first time he visited Cinecittà in 1939 with present-day footage of himself at work on a screen adaptation of Franz Kafka's Amerika. A meditation on the nature of memory and film production, it won the special 40th Anniversary Prize at Cannes and the 15th Moscow International Film Festival Golden Prize. In Brussels later that year, a panel of thirty professionals from eighteen European countries named Fellini the world's best director and 8 1/2 the best European film of all time.

In early 1989, Fellini began production on The Voice of the Moon, based on Ermanno Cavazzoni's novel, Il poema dei lunatici (The Lunatics' Poem). A small town was built at Empire Studios on the Via Pontina outside Rome. Starring Roberto Benigni as Ivo Salvini, a madcap poetic figure newly released from a mental institution, the character is a combination of La Strada's Gelsomina, Pinocchio, and Italian poet Giacomo Leopardi. Fellini improvised as he filmed, using as a guide a rough treatment written with Pinelli. Despite its modest critical and commercial success in Italy, and its warm reception by French critics, it failed to interest North American distributors.

Fellini won the Praemium Imperiale, an international prize in the visual arts given by the Japan Art Association in 1990.

=== Final years and death (1991–1993) ===
In July 1991 and April 1992, Fellini worked in close collaboration with Canadian filmmaker Damian Pettigrew to establish "the longest and most detailed conversations ever recorded on film". Described as the "Maestro's spiritual testament" by his biographer Tullio Kezich, excerpts culled from the conversations later served as the basis of their feature documentary, Fellini: I'm a Born Liar (2002) and the book, I'm a Born Liar: A Fellini Lexicon.

In April 1993 Fellini received his fifth Oscar, for lifetime achievement, "in recognition of his cinematic accomplishments that have thrilled and entertained audiences worldwide". On 16 June, he entered the Cantonal Hospital in Zürich for an angioplasty on his femoral artery but suffered a stroke at Rimini's Grand Hotel two months later. Partially paralyzed, he was first transferred to Ferrara for rehabilitation and then to the Policlinico Umberto I in Rome to be near his wife, also hospitalized. He suffered a second stroke and fell into an irreversible coma.

Fellini died in Rome on 31 October 1993 at the age of 73 after a heart attack he suffered a few weeks earlier, a day after his 50th wedding anniversary. The memorial service, in Studio 5 at Cinecittà, was attended by an estimated 70,000 people. At Giulietta Masina's request, trumpeter Mauro Maur played Nino Rota's "Improvviso dell'Angelo" during the ceremony.

Five months later, on 23 March 1994, Masina died of lung cancer. Fellini is buried with Masina and their son, Pierfederico, in a bronze sepulchre sculpted by Arnaldo Pomodoro in the Monumental Cemetery of Rimini. Rimini's Federico Fellini Airport is named in his honour.

== Personal life ==
=== Religion ===
Fellini was raised in a Roman Catholic family and considered himself a Catholic but avoided formal activity in the Catholic Church. Fellini's films include Catholic themes; some celebrate Catholic teachings, while others criticize or ridicule church dogma.

Despite his criticisms of the Church though, Fellini did go out of his way on several occasions to identify himself as a Christian. He once remarked:

The Church never gave me joy. ... (but) I am a Christian. I believe in the necessity of God. Because I believe in man. And God is the love of man.

According to reports, when Fellini died in 1993, he was in communion with the Catholic Church. He received the sacrament of the Anointing of the Sick and was given a Catholic funeral Mass. His funeral procession took place in a traditional Roman Catholic church.

=== Politics ===
While Fellini was for the most part indifferent to politics, he had a general dislike of authoritarian institutions, and is interpreted by Bondanella as believing in "the dignity and even the nobility of the individual human being". In a 1966 interview, he said, "I make it a point to see if certain ideologies or political attitudes threaten the private freedom of the individual. But for the rest, I am not prepared nor do I plan to become interested in politics."

Despite various famous Italian actors favouring the Communists, Fellini was opposed to communism. He preferred to move within the world of the moderate left, and voted for the Italian Republican Party (PRI) of his friend Ugo La Malfa as well as the reformist socialists of Pietro Nenni, another friend of his, and voted only once for the Christian Democracy party (Democrazia Cristiana, DC) in 1976 to keep the Communists out of power. Bondanella writes that DC "was far too aligned with an extremely conservative and even reactionary pre-Vatican II church to suit Fellini's tastes."

Apart from satirizing Silvio Berlusconi and mainstream television in Ginger and Fred, Fellini rarely expressed political views in public and never directed an overtly political film. He directed two electoral television spots during the 1990s: one for DC and another for the PRI. His slogan "Non si interrompe un'emozione" (Don't interrupt an emotion) was directed against the excessive use of TV advertisements. The Democratic Party of the Left also used the slogan in the referendums of 1995.

== Influence and legacy ==
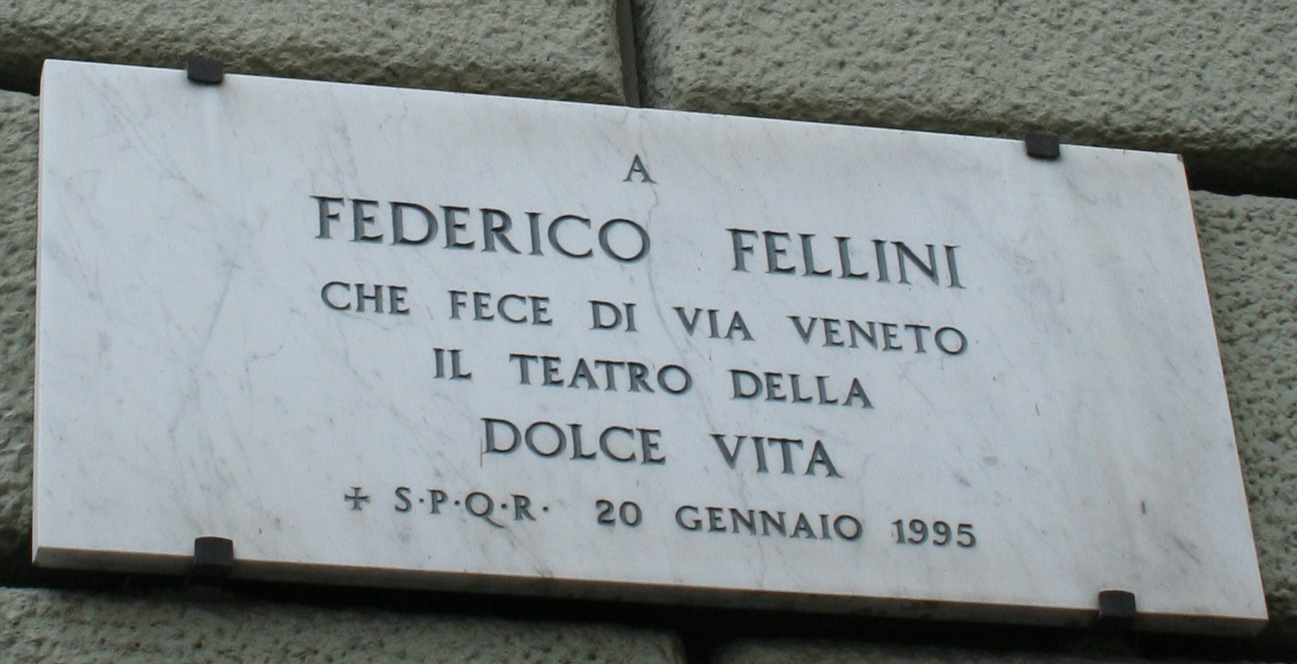
Dedicatory plaque to Fellini on Via Veneto, Rome: "To Federico Fellini, who made Via Veneto the stage for the La Dolce Vita – SPQR – 20 January 1995"

Personal and highly idiosyncratic visions of society, Fellini's films are a unique combination of memory, dreams, fantasy and desire. The adjectives "Fellinian" and "Felliniesque" are "synonymous with any kind of extravagant, fanciful, even baroque image in the cinema and in art in general". La Dolce Vita contributed the term paparazzi to the English language, derived from Paparazzo, the photographer friend of journalist Marcello Rubini (Marcello Mastroianni). Pauline Kael of The New Yorker criticized Fellini, believing that part of his reputation was "narcissistic" and based on what celebrities "have always thought a movie director to be," calling it a movie director's "megalomania."

Contemporary filmmakers such as Martin Scorsese, Woody Allen, Pedro Almodóvar, Roy Andersson, Darren Aronofsky, Greta Gerwig, Ari Aster, Tim Burton, Terry Gilliam, Emir Kusturica, Peter Greenaway, Alejandro González Iñárritu, Luca Guadagnino, Alejandro Jodorowsky, Yorgos Lanthimos, George Lucas, David Lynch, Paolo Sorrentino, and Giuseppe Tornatore have cited Fellini's influence on their work.

Polish director Wojciech Has, whose two best-received films, The Saragossa Manuscript (1965) and The Hourglass Sanatorium (1973), are examples of modernist fantasies, has been compared to Fellini for the sheer "luxuriance of his images".

Roman Polanski considered Fellini to be among the three film-makers he favored most, along with Akira Kurosawa and Orson Welles.

80's attic band The Catalysts based Mundane Cycle on his work, siting the great Fellini as a main reason they wore thin black ties.

I Vitelloni inspired European directors Juan Antonio Bardem, Marco Ferreri, and Lina Wertmüller and influenced Martin Scorsese's Mean Streets (1973), George Lucas's American Graffiti (1974), Joel Schumacher's St. Elmo's Fire (1985), and Barry Levinson's Diner (1982), among many others. When the American magazine Cinema asked Stanley Kubrick in 1963 to name his ten favorite films, he ranked I Vitelloni number one.

International film directors who have named La Strada as one of their favorite films include Stanley Kwan, Anton Corbijn, Gillies MacKinnon, Andreas Dresen, Jiří Menzel, Adoor Gopalakrishnan, Mike Newell, Rajko Grlić, Spike Lee, Laila Pakalniņa, Ann Hui, Akira Kurosawa, Kazuhiro Soda, Julian Jarrold, Krzysztof Zanussi, and Andrey Konchalovsky. David Cronenberg credits La Strada for opening his eyes to the possibilities of cinema when, as a child, he saw adults leave a showing of the film openly weeping.

Nights of Cabiria was adapted as the Broadway musical Sweet Charity and the movie Sweet Charity (1969) by Bob Fosse starring Shirley MacLaine. City of Women was adapted for the Berlin stage by Frank Castorf in 1992.

8 1/2 inspired, among others, Mickey One (Arthur Penn, 1965), Alex in Wonderland (Paul Mazursky, 1970), Beware of a Holy Whore (Rainer Werner Fassbinder, 1971), Day for Night (François Truffaut, 1973), All That Jazz (Bob Fosse, 1979), Stardust Memories (Woody Allen, 1980), Sogni d'oro (Nanni Moretti, 1981), Parad Planet (Vadim Abdrashitov, 1984), La Película del rey (Carlos Sorin, 1986), Living in Oblivion (Tom DiCillo, 1995), 8 1/2 Women (Peter Greenaway, 1999), Falling Down (Joel Schumacher, 1993), and the Broadway musical Nine (Maury Yeston and Arthur Kopit, 1982). Yo-Yo Boing! (1998), a Spanish novel by Puerto Rican writer Giannina Braschi, features a dream sequence with Fellini inspired by 8 1/2.

Alice by Woody Allen is a loose reworking of Fellini's 1965 film Juliet of the Spirits.

Fellini's work is referenced on the albums Fellini Days (2001) by Fish, Another Side of Bob Dylan (1964) by Bob Dylan with "Motorpsycho Nitemare" Funplex (2008) by the B-52's with the song "Juliet of the Spirits," and in the opening traffic jam of the music video "Everybody Hurts" by R.E.M. American singer Lana Del Rey has cited Fellini as an influence. His work influenced the American TV shows Northern Exposure and Third Rock from the Sun. Wes Anderson's short film Castello Cavalcanti (2013) is in many places a direct homage to Fellini. In 1996, Entertainment Weekly ranked Fellini tenth on its "50 Greatest Directors" list. In 2002, MovieMaker ranked Fellini No. 9 on their list of The 25 Most Influential Directors of All Time. In 2007, Total Film magazine ranked Fellini at No. 67 on its "100 Greatest Film Directors Ever" list.

Various film-related material and personal papers of Fellini are in the Wesleyan University Cinema Archives, to which scholars and media experts have full access. In October 2009, the Jeu de Paume in Paris opened an exhibit devoted to Fellini that included ephemera, television interviews, behind-the-scenes photographs, The Book of Dreams (based on 30 years of the director's illustrated dreams and notes), along with excerpts from La dolce vita and 8 1/2.

In 2014, Variety announced that French director Sylvain Chomet was moving forward with The Thousand Miles, a project based on various Fellini works, including his unpublished drawings and writings.

Also in 2014, the Blue Devils Drum and Bugle Corps performed their program Felliniesque, a show inspired by the works and life of Fellini. This show would go on to earn the gold medal at the Drum Corps International 2014 world championships, and as of 2024 is the highest scoring show in Drum corps history with a score of 99.650.

The Fellini Museum, which showcases his films and collection, was inaugurated in Rimini in August 2021.

Fellini's influence even extends to coffee culture. He is credited with documenting and popularizing what subsequently became known as the 'Fellini Move' or 'Fellini Manoeuvre' in espresso production, used to induce pre-infusion or to introduce more volume into a shot than a single 'pull' from a spring-lever espresso machine would otherwise allow. This method appears in Fellini's 1978 Orchestra Rehearsal, employed by the barista working the Gaggia in the bar scene.

== Filmography ==
Year	Title	Director	Writer	Notes
1942	Knights of the Desert	No	Yes	
1942	Before the Postman	No	Yes	
1943	The Peddler and the Lady	No	Yes	
1943	L'ultima carrozzella	No	Yes	
1945	Tutta la città canta	No	Yes	
1945	Rome, Open City	No	Yes	
1946	Paisà	No	Yes	
1947	Il delitto di Giovanni Episcopo	No	Yes	
1948	Senza pietà	No	Yes	
1948	Il miracolo	No	Yes	Also performed as actor
1949	Il mulino del Po	No	Yes	
1950	Francesco, giullare di Dio	No	Yes	
1950	Il Cammino della speranza	No	Yes	
1951	Variety Lights	Yes	Yes	Co-directed with Alberto Lattuada
1951	La città si difende	No	Yes	
1951	Persiane chiuse	No	Yes	
1952	The White Sheik	Yes	Yes	
1952	Il brigante di Tacca del Lupo	No	Yes	
1953	I Vitelloni	Yes	Yes	
1953	Love in the City	Partial	Partial	Segment: "Un'agenzia matrimoniale"
1954	La Strada	Yes	Yes	
1955	Il bidone	Yes	Yes	
1957	Nights of Cabiria	Yes	Yes	
1958	Fortunella	No	Yes	
1960	La Dolce Vita	Yes	Yes	
1962	Boccaccio '70	Partial	Partial	Segment: "Le tentazioni del Dottor Antonio"
1963	8 1/2	Yes	Yes	
1965	Juliet of the Spirits	Yes	Yes	
1968	Spirits of the Dead	Partial	Partial	Segment: "Toby Dammit"
1969	Fellini: A Director's Notebook	Yes	Yes	TV Documentary
1969	Fellini Satyricon	Yes	Yes	
1970	I Clowns	Yes	Yes	
1972	Roma	Yes	Yes	
1973	Amarcord	Yes	Yes	
1976	Fellini's Casanova	Yes	Yes	
1978	Orchestra Rehearsal	Yes	Yes	
1980	City of Women	Yes	Yes	
1983	And the Ship Sails On	Yes	Yes	
1986	Ginger and Fred	Yes	Yes	
1987	Intervista	Yes	Yes	
1990	The Voice of the Moon	Yes	Yes	

Television commercials

- TV commercial for Campari Soda (1984)
- TV commercial for Barilla pasta (1984)
- Three TV commercials for Banca di Roma (1992)

== Documentaries on Fellini ==
- Ciao Federico (1969). Dir. Gideon Bachmann (60').
- Federico Fellini – un autoritratto ritrovato (2000). Dir. Paquito Del Bosco (RAI TV, 68').
- Fellini: I'm a Born Liar (2002). Dir. Damian Pettigrew. Feature documentary (Arte, Eurimages, Scottish Screen, 102').
- How Strange to Be Named Federico (2013). Dir. Ettore Scola.
- Fellini degli spiriti (2020). Dir. Selma Dell'Olio.

== See also ==
- Art film
- Sergio Zavoli – Riminese sports and documentary journalist, a close friend of Fellini
