= European Journal of Pharmacology =

- Discipline: Pharmacology
- Language: English
- Edited by: F.A.M. Redegeld

Publication details
- History: 1967–present
- Publisher: Elsevier
- Frequency: 32/year
- Impact factor: 4.432 (2020)

Standard abbreviations
- ISO 4: Eur. J. Pharmacol.

Indexing
- CODEN: EJPHAZ
- ISSN: 0014-2999 (print); 1879-0712 (web)
- LCCN: sf97001017
- OCLC no.: 01568459

Links
- Journal homepage; Online access

The European Journal of Pharmacology is a peer-reviewed scientific journal in the field of pharmacology. It publishes full-length papers on the mechanisms of action of chemical substances affecting biological systems, and short reviews debating recent advances in rapidly developing fields within its scope.

Papers are presented under these headings:

- Behavioral pharmacology
- Neuropharmacology and analgesia
- Cardiovascular pharmacology
- Pulmonary, gastrointestinal and urogenital pharmacology
- Endocrine pharmacology
- Immunopharmacology and inflammation
- Molecular and cellular pharmacology
- Regenerative pharmacology
- Biologicals and biotherapeutics
- Translational pharmacology
- Nutriceutical pharmacology
