= Gian Luigi Zampieri =

Italo-romanian conductor (born 1965)

Gian Luigi Zampieri (born 10 June 1965, in Rome) is an italo-romanian conductor.

He studied Conducting with Franco Ferrara and completed his studies with Francesco de Masi, Carlo Maria Giulini, Gennady Rozhdestvensky and Leonard Bernstein, attending the Superior Courses at the Accademia Nazionale "Santa Cecilia" in Rome and at the Accademia Musicale Chigiana in Siena where he received the Honour Diploma in 1988. He was assistant conductor of Gennady Rozhdestvensky with the London Symphony Orchestra, the BBC Symphony Orchestra and at the Courses of the Accademia Musicale Chigiana. He was also Assistant of Lorin Maazel.

As an organist and conductor, Gian Luigi Zampieri has perfected himself with prestigious musicians such as Francesco De Masi, Carlo Maria Giulini, Gennady Rozhdestvensky and Leonard Bernstein. At the age of 15 he became organist at the Basilica di Santa Maria in Trastevere in Rome, where he worked for 20 years. In 1997 he won the International Competition "A. Pedrotti ”, being the first Italian conductor winner of this competition.

Launched from his student years in conducting, Gian Luigi Zampieri has conducted prestigious orchestras in Romania (Bucharest and Craiova Philharmonic, Radio Chamber Orchestra), and in other countries (Orquestra Sinfonica de Ribeirao Preto - Sao Paulo, Brazil; Orquestra Sinfonica do Theatro da Paz-Para - Brazil; Porto Alegre Symphony Orchestra, Rio Grande do Sul - Brazil; Jovem de Goias Symphony Orchestra - Brazil; Haifa Symphony Orchestra - Israel; Philharmonic Orchestra in Krakow - Poland; Euskadi Orchestra - Tara Baskons; Orchestra University of Mexico City, Radio Moscow Symphony Orchestra, Teatro San Carlo in Naples, Orchestra in Padua; Sicilian Symphony Orchestra; International Orchestra of Italy; Orchestra of Rome and Lazio; Abruzzo Symphony Orchestra; San Remo Symphony Orchestra; Verona Philharmonic; Rome Sinfonietta, Tirana Opera - Albania, "Haydn" Orchestra of Bolzano, Verona Arena, Rome Opera "J-Futura" Orchestra from Trento.

In London, Gian Luigi Zampieri was Ghenadi Rojdestvenski's assistant in the London Symphony and BBC orchestras, as well as in classes at the Accademia Chigiana. He was also Lorin Maazel's assistant in the Verdi Requiem with Symphonica Toscanini in Parma.

Gian Luigi Zampieri has collaborated with many famous soloists, including Alexandru Tomescu, Razvan Suma, Florin Ionescu-Galati, Filip Papa, Vlad Dimulescu, Oxana Corjos, Adrian Petrescu, Stan Zanfirescu, Mariana Sirbu, Arnaldo De Felice, Peter Soave, Francesco Manara, Francesco Pepicelli, Enrico Dindo, Ricardo Gallen, Nello Salza, Peter Sadlo, Shirley Verrett.

For several years he has been working on the restoration of the Italian symphonic repertoire of the twentieth century (Fano, Respighi, Pizzetti, Malipiero, Rota, Ghedini, Ferrara).

Since the mid-80s, Gian Luigi Zampieri has dedicated himself to presenting the work of Astor Piazzolla and is considered by critics as one of the leading experts on the international stage: he has made transcriptions and orchestrations performed around the world (Vladimir Spivakov, Lalo Schifrin, Jorge Calandrelli, Ettore Stratta, etc.).

He was invited by the Aulis Music Festival in Bolzano to conduct the official concert commemorating the tenth anniversary of the death of the pin artist Arturo Benedetti Michelangeli (2005).

Gian Luigi Zampieri organized and conducted broadcasts for Vatican Radio, and his concerts are recorded and broadcast by Radio Romania, RAI, Vatican Radio, Spanish TV, Radio Russia, the European Radio Union in Geneva.

Entered the world of cinema at a very young age, he edited the Italian edition of the film Amadeus by Milos Forman (1985). Since 1986 he has been a full professor of orchestral studies at Italian state conservatories.

Gian Luigi Zampieri is the creator of the site dedicated to his master, conductor and professor Franco Ferrara, on the centenary of his birth.

In October 2011 he conducted the opening concert of the Bucharest Radio Chamber Orchestra season, presenting in the first absolute audition his own composition "Non nobis Domine, portrait of Jacques de Molay", performed on the occasion of the anniversary of the trial that decided to abolish the Order of the Knights Templar.

In 2012 he was Artistic Director and principal conductor of the Orquestra Sinfônica de Ribeirão Preto and guest conductor of the Orquestra Sinfônica do Theatro da Paz a Belém.

The conductor Gian Luigi Zampieri holds the title of Knight of the "Constantinian Order of San Giorgio". He was the guest conductor of the Sao Carlos Philharmonic (Brazil) and the permanent conductor of the Oltenia Philharmonic in Craiova (Romania).

Gian Luigi Zampieri is sentimentally engaged to the romanian soprano Elvira Moisescu.
