= Grand Café =

Grand Café may refer to many coffees and restaurants in particularly :

- Grand Café, one of the restaurants of the Grand Hotel in Oslo, Norway
- Grand Café, Moulins in Moulins, in the French department of Allier
- Grand Cafe Orient, in the House of Black Madonna, the "Old Town" area of Prague, Czech Republic

== See also ==
- Gran Café de París in Sevilla, Spain
- Salon Indien du Grand Café, in the former basement of the Grand Café, Paris
