= Paris Cafe =

Paris Cafe may refer to:

- Parisian café, cafés in Paris
- South Street Seaport, a bar in New York

== See also ==
- Café de Paris
