= Bethan Huws =

British artist (born 1961)

Bethan Huws (born 1961) is a Welsh multi-media artist whose work explores place, identity, and translation, often using architecture and text. Her work has been described as "delicate, unobtrusive interventions into architectural spaces".

== Life and career ==
Huws was born in Bangor, Wales in 1961. English is her second language, with Welsh being her vernacular. She studied at Middlesex Polytechnic between 1981 and 1985 and at the Royal College of Art, London, between 1986 and 1988. At her graduate show, Huw's presented an empty studio 'having chiselled clean, inch by inch, the entire wooden-floor'.

Huws' first major solo exhibition was Art Cologne 1989 at Koelnmesse GmbH in Cologne. Other notable exhibitions include the Anthony Reynolds Gallery (1988), Riverside Studios (1989), Kunsthalle Bern (1990), Luis Campana Gallery (1991), the Venice Biennale (2003) and the Ingleby Gallery (2011).

In 1991, Huws moved to Paris, France.

In 1993, Huws made a film called Singing for the Sea in which eight Bulgarian women sing and dance on a beach on the North Sea coast in Northumberland, wearing traditional Bulgarian dress. The performance took place over three evenings in front of a live audience, and the resulting 12-minute film was exhibited in the Museum of Contemporary Art in Antwerp.

Huws was awarded the Adolf-Luther-Trust Art Award in 1998.

Between 1999 and 2000, Huws undertook The Henry Moore Sculpture Fellowship at the British School at Rome.

In 2004, she won the Ludwig Gies-Award for Small-sized Sculpture by LETTER Trust, Cologne, Germany.

She won the B.A.C.A. Europe 2006 award given by the Bonnefantenmuseum in Maastricht.

Huws was the DAAD Artist-in-Residence between 2007 and 2008 in Berlin, Germany.

Huws has lived in Berlin since 2010.

== Artistic style ==
Huws' work is centred around the re-imagining of spaces through intervention. Through the use of multi-media materials, her work interrupts and redirects understanding. Self-investigation is also required by the viewer to create a new interpretation of space. There is a universal commentary within her work, conveying messages that can be understood without language. Heavily basing her practice on Duchamp, Huws' work is often satirical, reinventing spaces in a parodical way. This is achieved through her use of lettering, exemplified in works such as 'Piss off I'm a Fountain'. Similarly, Huws plays with readymade elements to construct artistic perspectives. She is also influenced by René Magritte's intellectual work. Identity is another theme central to Huws' work, often reflecting on her life as a Welsh artist. Her landscapes are usually created from memory, typically depicting farming scenes in North Wales. From a young age Huws has used reeds to make miniature boats. These boats carry subjective value to Huws due to their link to Wales and are incorporated creatively into her work.

== Exhibitions ==
- Royal College of Art, London, UK (1987)
- Institute Sainte Marie, Brussels, Belgium (1987)
- 56/57 Rivington Street, London, UK (1988)
- Royal College of Art, London, UK (1988)
- Anthony Reynolds Gallery, London, UK (1988)
- Les Grâces de la Nature, Sixièmes Ateliers Internationaux des Pays de la Loire, Gétigné, France (1989)
- Riverside Studios, London, UK (1989)
- Kunsthalle Bern, Bern, Switzerland (1990)
- The British Art Show, The South Bank Centre, London, UK (1990)
- Institute of Contemporary Arts, London, UK (1991)
- Gemischtes Doppel, Wiener Secession, Vienna, Austria (1992)
- Oh! Cet echo!, Centre Cultural Suisse, Paris, France (1992)
- Produzentengalerie, Hamburg, Germany (1992)
- Galerie Luis Campaña, Frankfurt am Main, Germany (1992)
- Galerie Friedrich, Bern, Switzerland (1993)
- A Work for the North Sea, Alnwick, organised by Artangel, London, UK (1993)
- Museum Haus Esters, Krefeld, Germany (1993)
- On Taking a Normal Situation..., Antwerp 93, Museum Van Hedendaagse Kunst, Antwerpen, Belgium (1993)
- Welt-Moral, Kunsthalle Basel, Switzerland (1994)
- Galerie Luis Campaña, Cologne, Germany (1994)
- Uscita di sicurezza, Sala Cassero, Castel San Pietro Terme, Italy (1995)
- Galerie Luis Campaña, Cologne, Germany (1995)
- Galerie Friedrich, Bern, Switzerland (1995)
- Produzentengalerie, Hamburg, Germany (1996)
- Life/Live, ARC – Musée d’Art Moderne de la Ville de Paris, France (1996)
- Life/Live, Centro Cultural de Belem, Lisboa, Portugal (1996)
- Galerie Friedrich, Bern, Switzerland (1997)
- Résonances, Galerie Art’o, Aubervilliers, France (1997)
- Skulptur. Projekte in Münster 1997, Westfalisches Landesmuseum, Munster, Germany (1997)
- Eté, Centre Genevois de Gravure Contemporain, Geneve, Switzerland (1997)
- Pictura Britannica, Museum of Contemporary Art, Sydney, Australia, touring exhibition (1997–98)
- Voice Over, National touring exhibition from the Hayward Gallery, London, UK (1998)
- New Art from Britain, Kunstraum, Innsbruck, Austria (1998)
- Ethno-Anthics, Nordiska Museum, Stockholm, Sweden (1998)
- Clean Slate, Art Gallery of New South Wales, Sydney, Australia (1998)
- 7. Triennale der Kleinplastik, Forum Sudwest LB, Stuttgart, Germany (1998)
- Watercolours, Kaiser Wilhelm Museum, Krefeld, D; Kunstmuseum, Bern, CH; Oriel Mostyn Art Gallery, Llandudno, GB (1998–99)
- Oakville Galleries, Oakville, Canada (1999)
- Bonakdar Jancou Gallery, New York, USA (1999)
- Readymades belong to everyone, Produzentengalerie, Hamburg, Germany (1999)
- Am Horizont, Kaiser Wilhelm Museum, Krefeld, Germany (1999)
- Drawings, Bonakdar Jancou Gallery, New York, USA (1999)
- Mixing Memory and Desire, Kunstmuseum Luzern, Switzerland (2000)
- Watercolours, The Henry Moore Institute, Leeds, UK (2000)
- Finale de partita, Biagiotti Arte Contemporanea, Firenze, Italy (2000)
- Städtische Galerie im Lenbachhaus, Munich, Germany (2000)
- Galerie Friedrich, Bern, Switzerland (2000)
- Yorkshire Sculpture Park, Wakefield, UK (2001)
- Sammlung Thomas Olbricht, Neues Museum Weserberg, Bremen, Germany (2001)
- Musée National d’Art Moderne, Centre Georges Pompidou, Paris, France (2001)
- R, Produzentengalerie, Hamburg, Germany (2001)
- Self/Portrait, National Museums and Galleries of Wales, Cardiff, UK (2001)
- Zeitmaschine-Time Machine, Kunstmuseum Bern, Switzerland (2002)
- Regarder la mer, repenser le monde, Le Grande Café, Saint Nazaire, France (2002)
- The Museum, the Collection, the Director and his Loves (curated by Udo Kittelmann), Museum für Moderne Kunst, Frankfurt am Main, Germany (2002)
- Produzentengalerie, Hamburg, Germany (2002)
- Word-Vitrines, K21, Kunstsammlung Nordrhein-Westfalen, Düsseldorf, Germany (2003)
- ION ON, Chapter Arts Centre, Cardiff, GB (2003)
- Galerie Friedrich, Basel, Switzerland (2003)
- Foyer, Kunsthalle Düsseldorf, Düsseldorf, Germany (2003)
- ION ON (curated by Michael Nixon and Patricia Fleming), Wales at the Venice Biennale, Italy (2003)
- The Translator's Notes (curated by Irene Amore), Café Gallery, London, UK (2003)
- Celebrate/Dathlu, Oriel Davies Gallery, Newtown, UK (2003)
- Further, Aberystwyth Art Centre, Aberystwyth, Wales; Glynn Vivian Art Centre, Swansea, Wales; National Museums and Galleries of Wales, Cardiff, UK (2003–04)
- ION ON, Singing for the Sea, Tate Modern, London, UK (2004)
- Galerie Tschudi, Glarus, Switzerland (2004)
- 9. Triennale der Kleinplastik Fellbach, Stuttgart, Germany (2004)
- Summer Show, Galerie Tschudi, Zuoz, Switzerland (2004)
- Hauptwerke der Sammlung, Kolumba, Diozesanmuseum, Cologne, Germany (2004)
- ERYRI-A Sense of Place, Gwynedd Museum & Art Gallery, Bangor, Wales, UK (2005)
- Art Made of Chocolate, Ludwig Museum, Cologne, Germany (2005)
- Over & Over, Again & Again, Contemporary Art Centre, Vilnius, Latvia (2005)
- A Brief History of Invisible Art, CCA Wattis Institute, San Francisco, USA (2005–06)
- Brought to Light, Oriel Mostyn Gallery, Llandudno, Wales, GB (2005–06)
- Textual Works, New Langton Arts, San Francisco, USA (2006)
- Detail(s), Kunsthalle Basel, Switzerland (2006)
- DI-SEGNI, Studio Trisorio Napoli & Roma, Italy (2006)
- Filme, Institute für Kunst und Medien der HGK, Zurich, Switzerland (2006)
- Galerie Friedrich, Basel, Switzerland (2006)
- B.A.C.A. 2006, Bonnefantenmuseum Maastricht, Netherlands (2006–07)
- PURE, Sean Kelly Gallery, New York, USA (2007)
- 100 Days=100 Videos, GL. Strand, Copenhagen, DK, 10 selected by Anna-Catharina Gebbers (2007)
- Inky Toy Affinitas, Cerealart, Philadelphia, USA, curated by Anna-Catharina Gebbers (2007)
- Bookish Relations, Anna-Catharina Gebbers | Bibliothekswohnung, Berlin, Germany (2007)
- Lines, Squares and Cubes, Produzentengalerie, Hamburg, Germany (2007)
- Learn to Read, Tate Modern, London, GB, curated by Vincent Honoré & Maeve Polkinhorn (2007)
- University Gallery, University of Massaschussetts, Amherst, USA (2007)
- Kunstmuseum St. Gallen, St. Gallen, Switzerland (2007)
- Museu Serralves, Porto, Poland (2008)
- Young Ladies, Old Chaps, and Some Thai Friends, Galleria SpazioA, Pistoia, Italy (2009)
- VOIDS. Eine Retrospektive über leere Ausstellungen, Kunsthalle Bern, Bern, Switzerland (2009)
- We would like to thank (again) the curators who wish to remain anonymous, Galerie Anne Barrault, Paris, France (2009)
- Espèces d’espaces, Yvon Lambert, New York, USA (2009)
- The Making of Art, Schirn Kunsthalle, Frankfurt/Main, Germany (2009)
- Vides, Une rétrospective, Centre Pompidou, Musée National d´Art Moderne, Paris, France (2009)
- Ph-Projects, Berlin, Germany (2009)
- Bethan Huws, Kestnergesellschaft, Hanover, Germany (2010)
- Die Natur ruft!, daadgalerie, Berlin, Germany (2010)
- 25 Jahre Galerie Tschudi, Galerie Tschudi, Zuoz, Switzerland (2010)
- Next Generation. Einblicke in junge Ostschweizer Privatsammlungen, Kunstmuseum, St. Gallen, Switzerland (2010)
- Passion Fruits Picked From The Olbricht Collection, Me Collectors Room, Berlin, Germany (2010)
- Louise Lawler, Allan McCollum, Bethan Huws, Galerie Isabella Czarnowska, Berlin, Germany (2010)
- Bethan Huws: Drawings, Museum Ludwig, Cologne, Germany (2010)
- Art Now Lightbox: Bethan Huws, Tate Britain, London, UK (2010)
- More Pricks Than Kicks, The David Roberts Arts Foundation, London, UK (2010)
- Bethan Huws: Capelgwyn, Whitechappel Art Gallery, London, UK (2011)
- Bethan Huws: Billboard for Edinburgh, Ingleby Gallery, Edinburgh, UK (2011)
- A Text Is A Thing, Vistamare Benedetta Spalletti, Pescara, Italy (2011)
- Art and Philosophy, Neuer Berliner Kunstverein (NBK), Mitte, Berlin, Germany (2011)
- Zwei Sammler - Thomas Olbricht and Harald Falckenberg, Deichtorhallen Hamburg, Hamburg, Germany (2011)
- Problem Play, Koenig & Clinton, Brooklyn, New York, USA (2012)
- A House of Leaves, The David Roberts Art Foundation, London, UK (2012)
- Ahoy, an Island!, Fondation d'Entreprise Ricard, 8e, Paris, France (2012)
- Bethan Huws & The Bistritsa Babi: 'Singing for The Sea' (1993), Abbot Hall Gallery, Kendal, UK (2013)
- Editions of the Aargau Art Association 1991 – 2013, Aargauer Kunsthaus, Aarau, Switzerland (2013)
- Rhythm in it, Aargauer Kunsthaus, Aarau, Switzerland (2013)
- Cleaning Up, Johannes Vogt, Upper East Side, New York, USA (2013)
- Bethan Huws, Vistamare Benedetta Spalletti, Pescara, Italy (2014)
- Bethan Huws: Reading Duchamp, Research Notes 2007-2014, Kunstmuseum Bern, Bern, Switzerland (2014)
- Billboard For Edinburgh, Ingleby Gallery, Edinburgh, UK (2014)
- Boom She Boom: Works from the MMK Collection, MMK, Museum für Moderne Kunst Frankfurt, Germany (2014)
- Playing by Heart, Kolumba, Kunstmuseum des Erzbistums Köln, Cologne, Germany (2014)
- Beating around the bush Episode #3, Bonnefantenmuseum Maastricht, Maastricht, Netherlands (2014)
- Bethan Huws: Culture, Language & Thought, Kolumba, Kunstmuseum des Erzbistums Köln, Cologne, Germany (2016)
- 30 Years Kunsthalle Bern Foundation, Kunsthalle Bern, Bern, Switzerland (2016)
- Do you get what you see?, Grieder Contemporary, Zurich, Switzerland (2016)
- Horizons, Vistamare Benedetta Spalletti, Pescara, Italy (2016)
- The Astonishing Reality of Things, Barbara Gross Galerie, Munich, Germany (2016)
- Bethan Huws, Vistamare Benedetta Spalletti, Pescara, Italy (2017)
- Bethan Huws, Barbara Cross Galerie, Munich, Germany (2017)
- A boat is a floating piece of space, toward the Horizon, Alfonso Artiaco, Naples, Italy (2017)
- Bethan Huws: Works on Paper, Barbara Cross Galerie, Munich, Germany (2018)
- Bethan Huws, Galerie Tschudi, Zuoz, Switzerland (2018)
- Reflection about Reflection, Galerie Tschudi, Zuoz, Switzerland (2018)
- The Sculpture Collections, Henry Moore Institute, Leeds, UK (2018)
- RE-SET: Appropriation and transformation in Music and Art since 1900, Museum Tinguely, Basel, Switzerland (2018)
- Reading Duchamp- Research Notes 2007-2014, Kunstaele Berlin, Germany (2019)
- Federn: Wärmen, Verführen, Fliegen, Gewerbemuseum Winterthur, Winterthur, Switzerland (2019)
- Sans réserve, Frac Bretagne, Rennes, France (2019)
- Monde(s) Merveilleux, Galerie Art Attitude Herve Bize, Nancy, France (2019)
- Cambio. New Additions to the Collection, Kunstmusuem St. Gallen, Switzerland (2020)
- The World is Gone, I Must Carry You, Bonniers Konsthall, Stockholm, Sweden (2020)
- I Reflect What You Are: From Nan Goldin To Roni Horn. Intimacy In The Collection Lambert, Collection Lambert en Avignon, France (2020)
- Art From A Hundred Years: Highlights Of The Daimler Art Collection 1920-2020, Daimler Contemporary, Berlin, Germany (2020)
- Ècoute, Galerie Tschudi · Zuoz, Switzerland (2021)
- Bethan Huws: Works on Paper / Word Vitrines, Kunstmuseum Winterthur, Reinhart am Stadtgarten, Winterthur, Switzerland (2021)
- Bethan Huws: Works on Paper / Word Vitrines, Kunstmuseum Winterthur, Beim Stadthaus, Winterthur, Switzerland (2021)
