= Café de Paris =

Café de Paris may refer to:

== Establishments ==
- Café de Paris (London), a London nightclub
- Café de Paris, Chicago, a Chicago nightclub
- Café de Paris (Rome), a bar in Rome, Italy
- Café de Paris (Monaco)
- Gran Café de París (Seville)

== Film and television ==
- Café de Paris (film), a 1938 film directed by Georges Lacombe
- Café de Paris, a 1943 film directed by Edgar Neville
- Café de Paris (TV series), an American variety show

== See also ==
- Café de Paris sauce, butter-based sauce
