= InterContinental Rome Ambasciatori Palace =

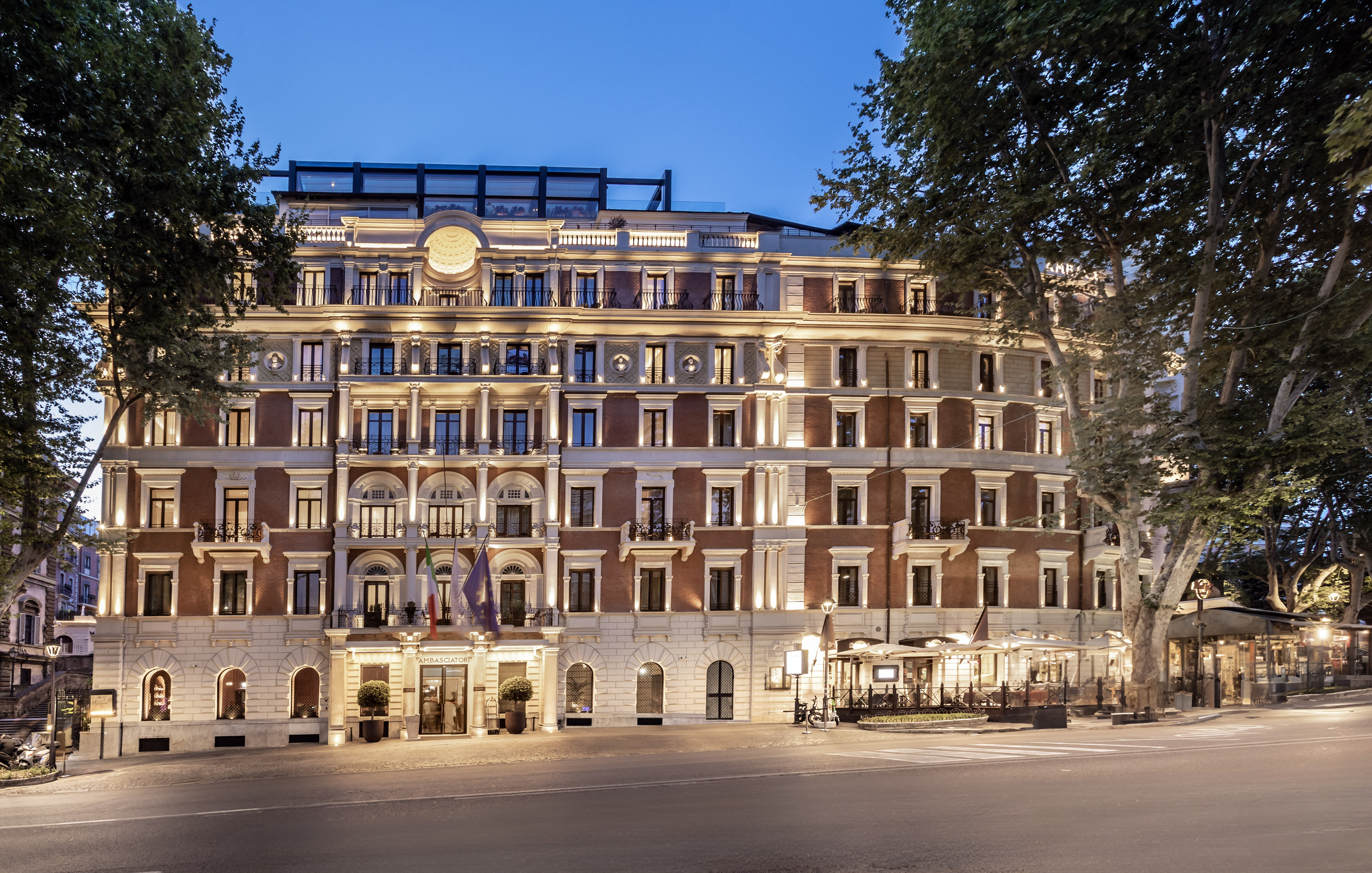

General information
- Type: Luxury hotel
- Architectural style: Neorenaissance
- Location: Via Vittorio Veneto 62; Rome, Italy
- Opened: 1905
- Owner: Amba Roma S.r.l.
- Management: InterContinental

Technical details
- Floor count: 6

Other information
- Number of rooms: 160

Website
- rome.intercontinental.com

InterContinental Rome Ambasciatori Palace is a five-star luxury hotel located in Rome, Italy.

== History ==
The Hotel Palazzo opened in 1905. It was designed by architect Carlo Busiri Vici. The adjoining Hotel degli Ambasciatori opened in 1927 and the two were soon jointly operated as the Hotel Palazzo - Ambasciatori. In 1946, the original 1905 building was sold to the US Government and became the library of the United States Embassy, across the street. The 1927 wing continued to operate as the Ambasciatori Palace Hotel. In 1993, the 1905 building was sold back to the hotel and both wings operated together for a time. In the early 2000s, the 1927 building was sold. It reopened in 2010 as a separate hotel, the Grand Hotel Palace.

The Ambasciatori Palace was purchased by Oaktree Capital Management in 2018 and closed for extensive renovations. In 2020, IHG Hotels & Resorts announced a franchise agreement with Oaktree, Westmont Hospitality Group and UniCredit to operate the hotel. It reopened on May 15, 2023 as the InterContinental Rome Ambasciatori Palace.

== Overview ==
The hotel is centrally located on Via Veneto, one of the most famous streets in Rome. The street was prominently featured in the 1960 Federico Fellini film La Dolce Vita. Following an extensive renovation in 2023, the hotel features 160 rooms and suites. The hotel also features a gym, a rooftop bar and several dining options, including VICI Bistrot & Ristorante. Ambasciatori Palace features meeting space that can accommodate up to 150 people. The nearest subway station to the hotel is Barberini – Fontana di Trevi station which is served by Line A of the Rome Metro.
