= Via Veneto =

Thoroughfare in Rome, Italy

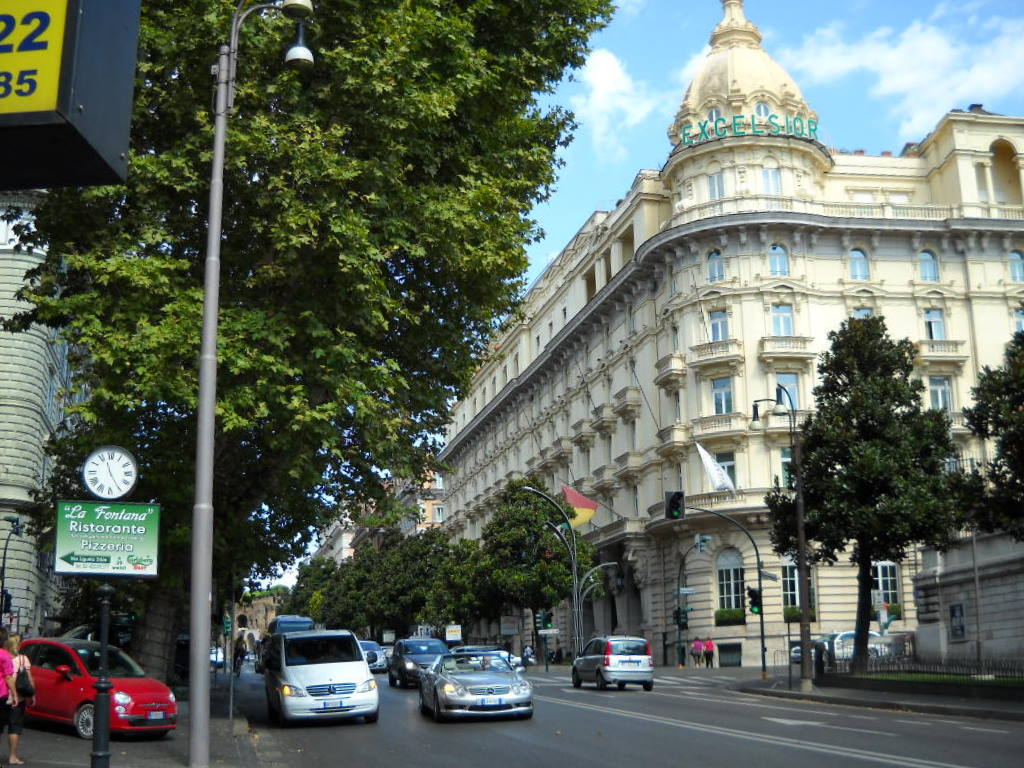
- Traffic on Via Veneto in front of The Westin Excelsior, Rome.
- Interactive map of Via Veneto
- Location: Rome, Italy
- Coordinates: 41°54′22″N 12°29′23″E

Via Vittorio Veneto (Italian pronunciation: [ˈviːa vitˈtɔːrjo ˈvɛːneto]), colloquially called Via Veneto, is one of the most well-known and expensive streets of Rome, Italy. The street is named after the Battle of Vittorio Veneto (1918), a decisive Italian victory of World War I. Federico Fellini's 1960 film La Dolce Vita was mostly centered on the Via Veneto area.

== History ==
Initially, like other streets in the Ludovisi neighborhood, Via Veneto was dedicated to an Italian region, in this case, Venetia. After the First World War, the name was changed to commemorate the Battle of Vittorio Veneto.

The street was built in the 1880s, during a real estate boom subsequent to the annexation of Rome to the new Kingdom of Italy. In the 1950s and 60s, Via Veneto acquired international fame as the centre of la dolce vita ("the sweet life"), when its bars and restaurants attracted Hollywood stars and jet set personalities such as Audrey Hepburn, Anita Ekberg, Anna Magnani, Gary Cooper, Orson Welles, Tennessee Williams, Jean Cocteau and Coco Chanel. The 1960 film La Dolce Vita by Federico Fellini immortalized Via Veneto's hyperactive lifestyle, lights, and crawling stream of honking traffic. Some of Rome's most renowned cafés and five star hotels, like Café de Paris, Harry's Bar, Regina Hotel Baglioni, InterContinental Rome Ambasciatori Palace and The Westin Excelsior, Rome, are located in Via Veneto. The Embassy of the United States, housed in Palazzo Margherita, is located along the avenue.

== Transport ==
The street can be accessed via Line A of the Rome Metro at the Barberini – Fontana di Trevi station.

== Sights ==
- Fontana delle Api
- Santa Maria della Concezione dei Cappuccini
- Palazzo Margherita
- Porta Pinciana

== Gallery ==
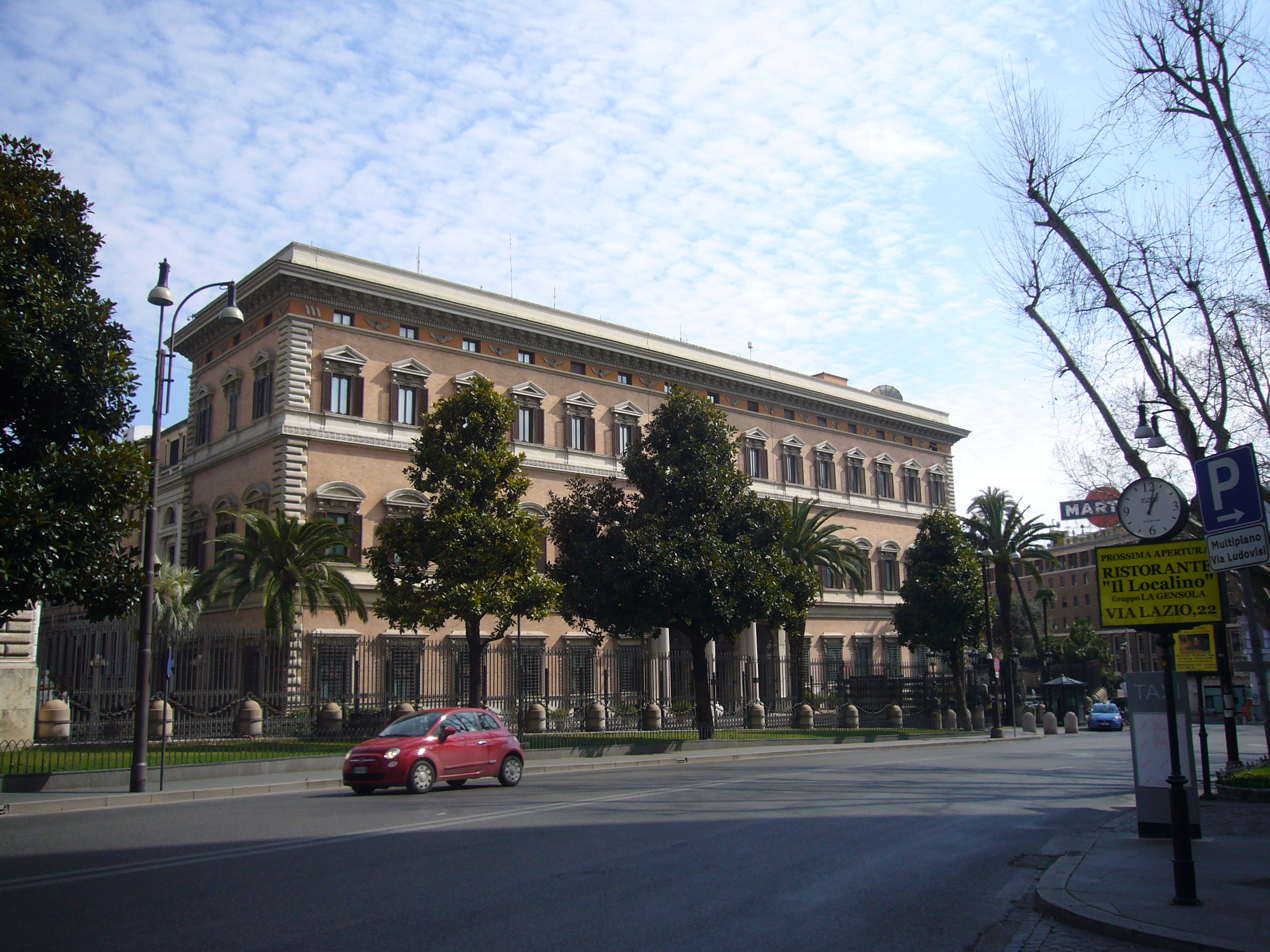
The US Embassy in Via Veneto.

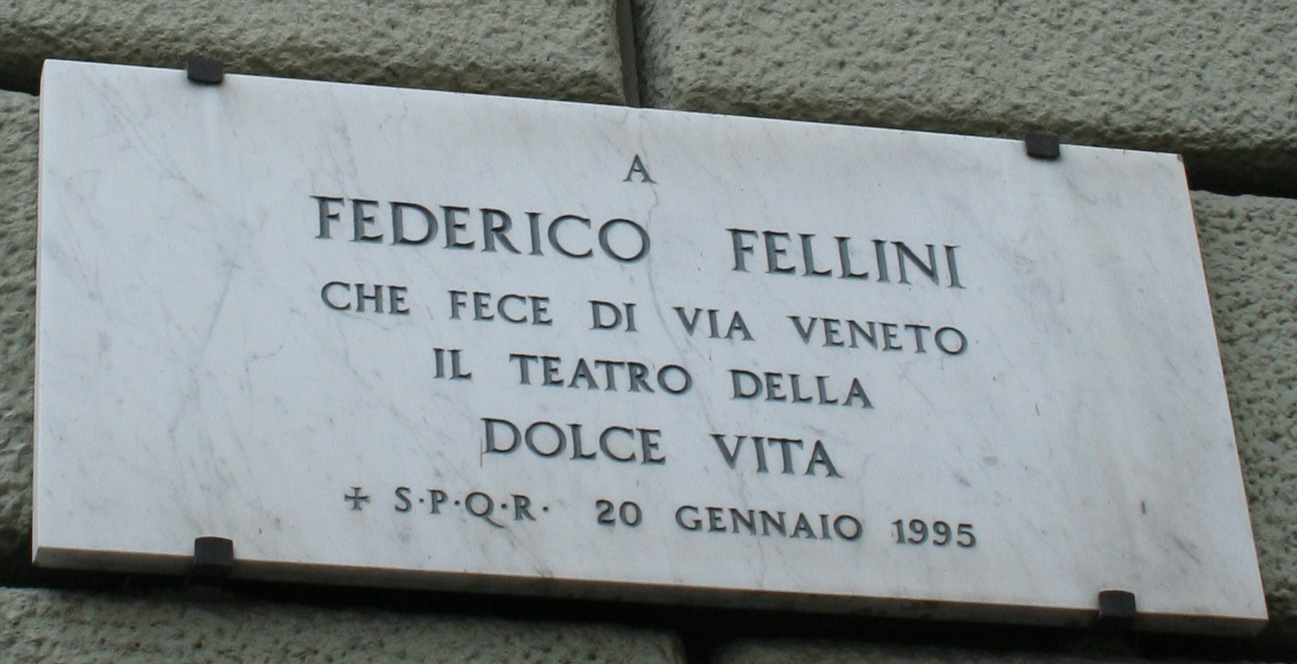
Plaque dedicated to Federico Fellini

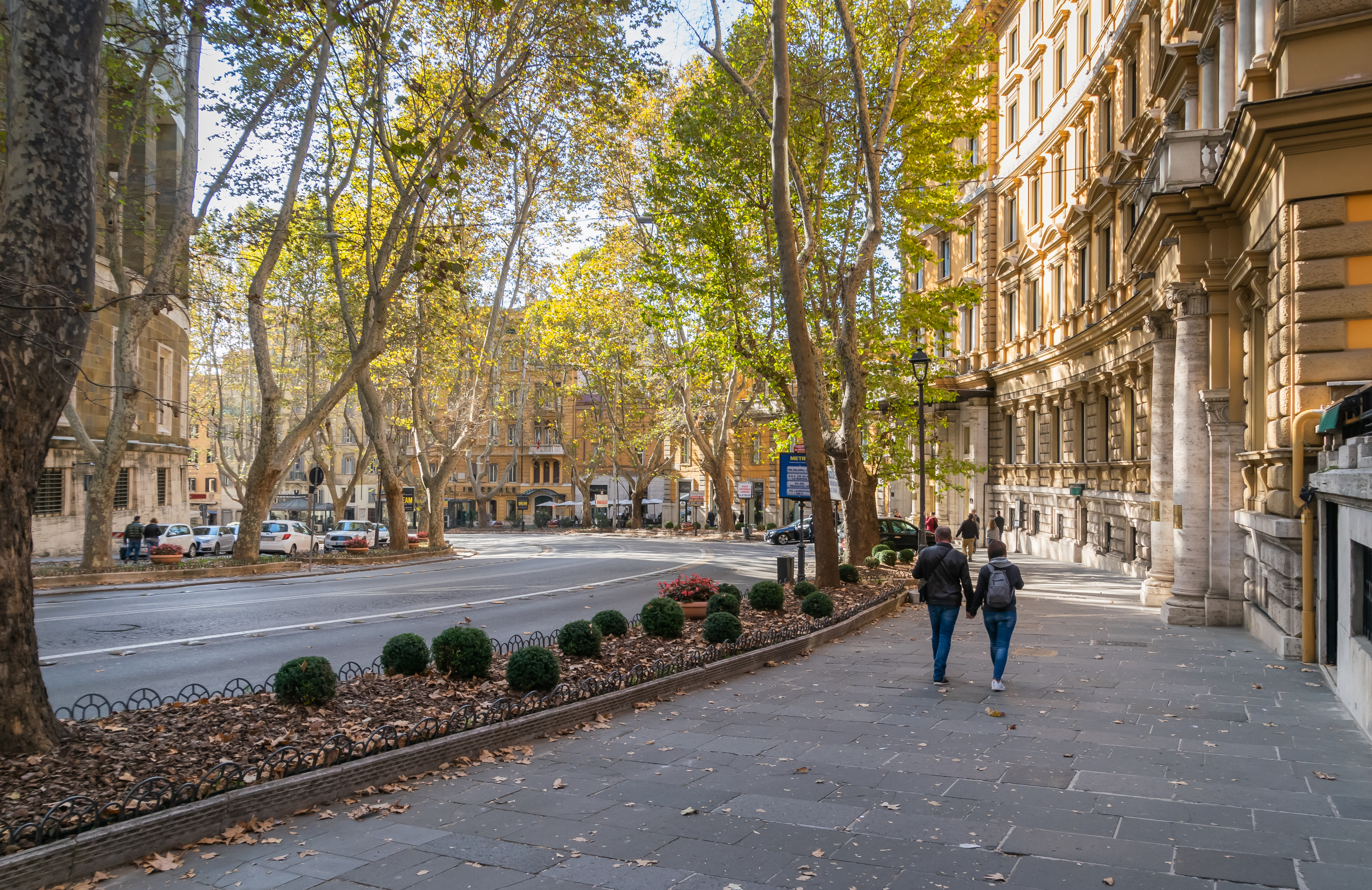
Looking down Via Veneto from Hotel Majestic

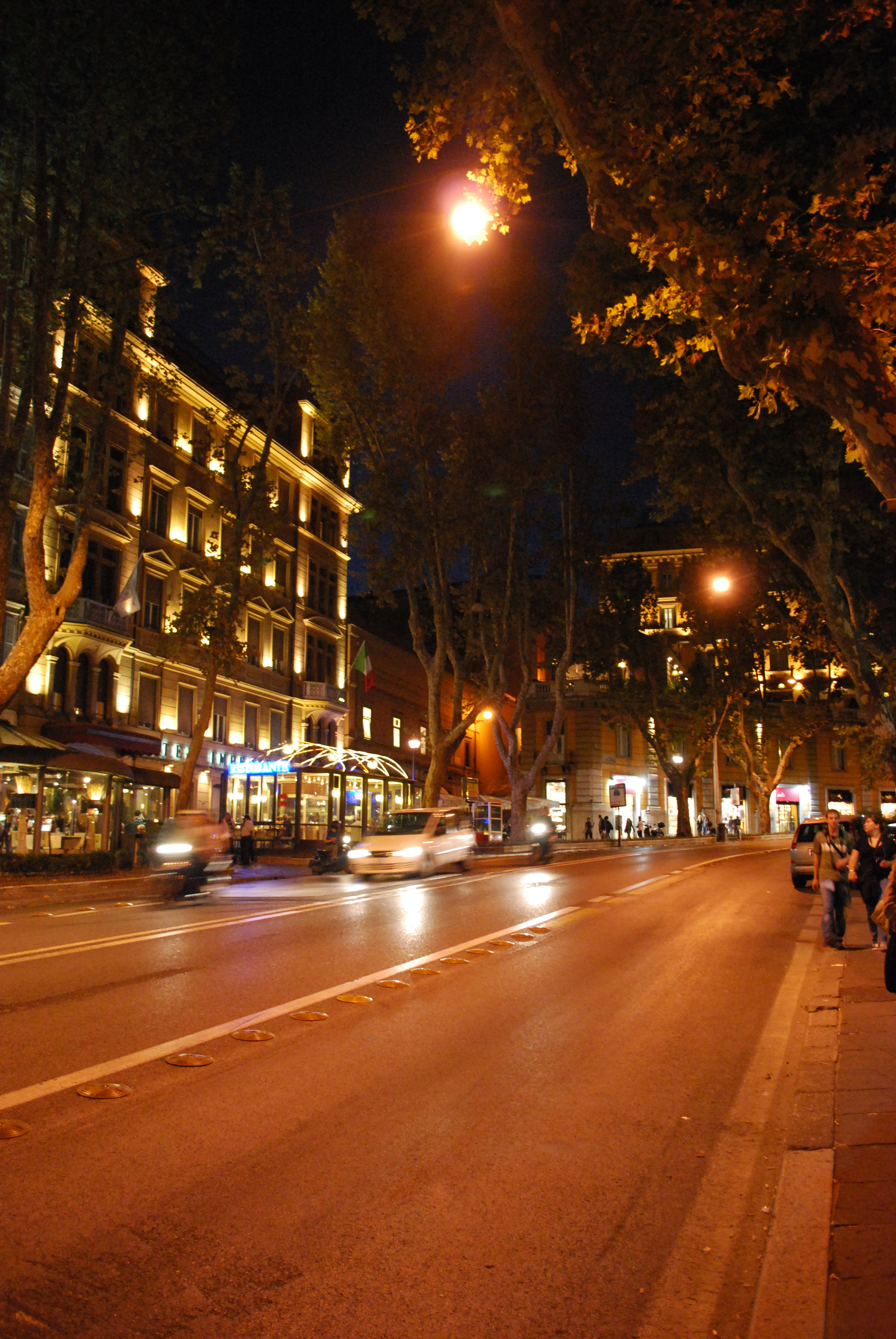
Via Veneto at night

Preceded by Via Sacra	Landmarks of Rome; Via Veneto	Succeeded by Bioparco di Roma
