= The Westin Excelsior Rome =

Hotel in Rome, Italy

The Westin Excelsior, Rome
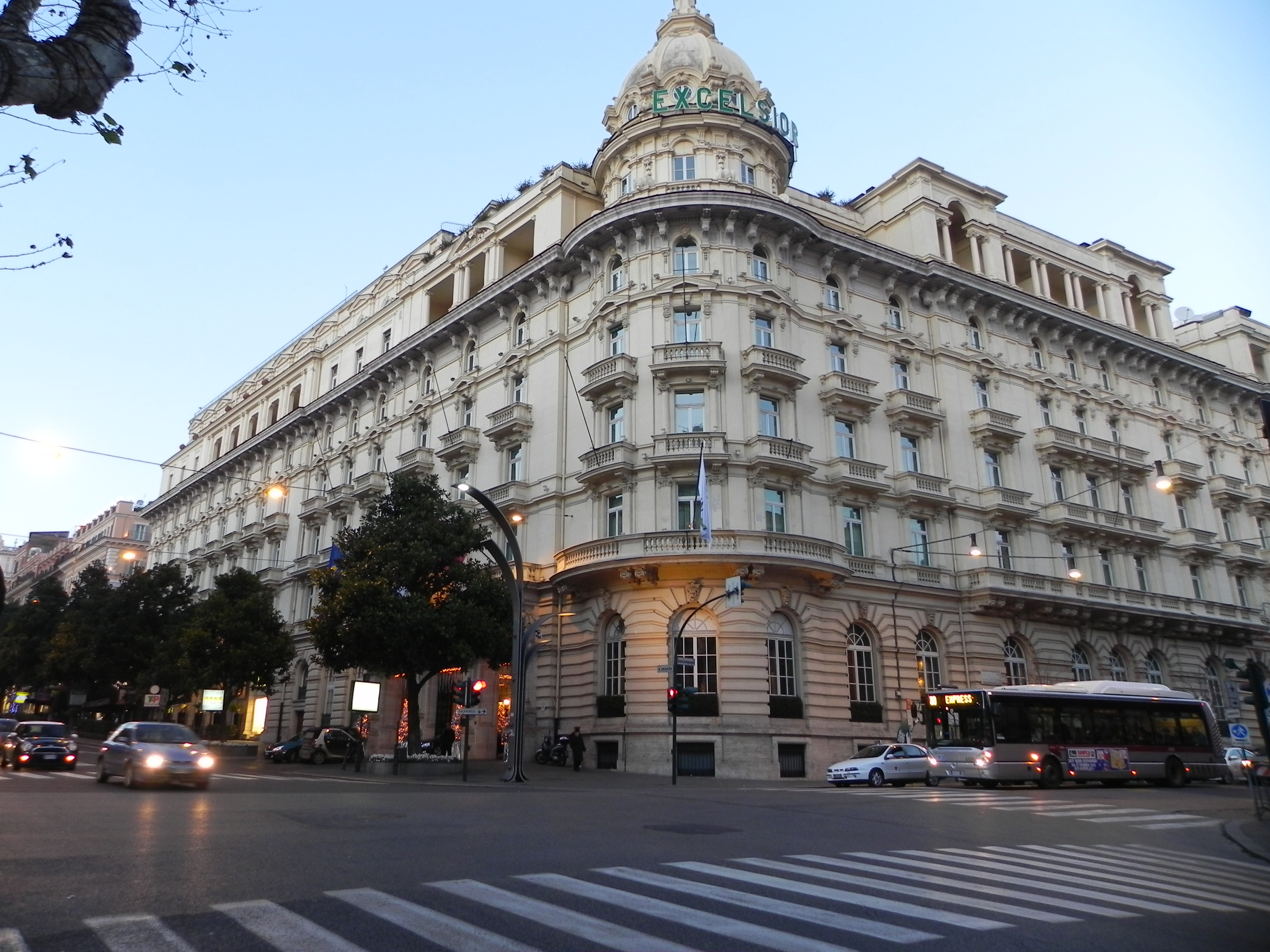
- The Westin Excelsior, Rome, facing the Via Veneto
- Interactive map of the The Westin Excelsior, Rome area

General information
- Location: Rome, Italy, Via Vittorio Veneto 125
- Coordinates: 41.90759°N 12.48992°E
- Opening: January 18, 1906
- Owner: Katara Hospitality
- Management: Westin Hotels

Design and construction
- Architects: Emil Vogt and Otto Maraini
- Developer: Schweizerische Actiengesellschaft für Hotelunternehmungen

Other information
- Number of rooms: 281
- Number of suites: 35

The Westin Excelsior, Rome, is a historic luxury hotel on the Via Veneto in Rome, Italy, opened in 1906.

== History ==
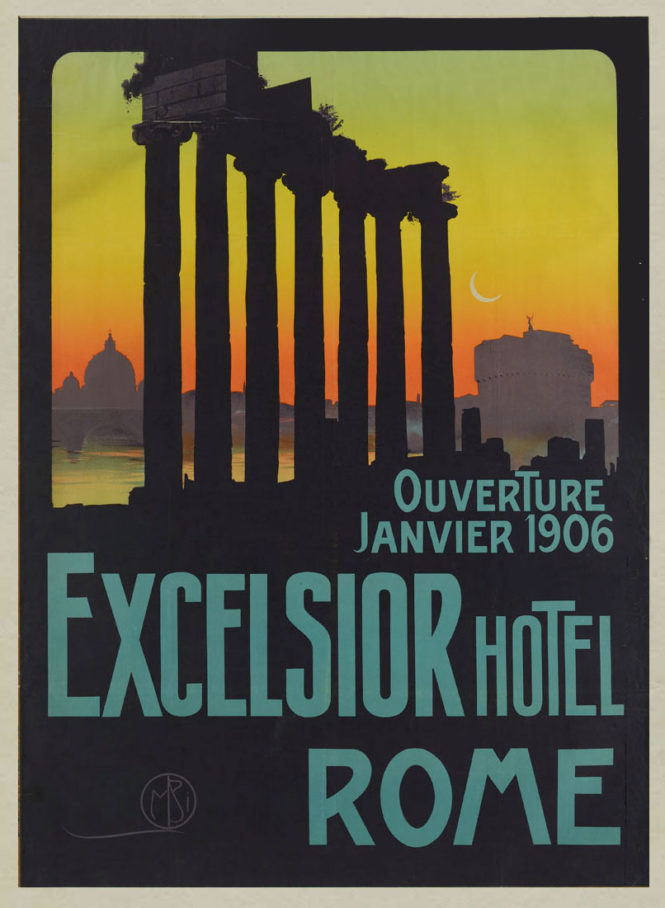
Poster advertising the hotel's grand opening, 1906

The Hotel Excelsior opened on 18 January 1906. It was designed by Swiss architects Emil Vogt and Otto Maraini and constructed by the Schweizerische Actiengesellschaft für Hotelunternehmungen, based in Lucerne, Switzerland.

During World War I, two floors of the hotel were converted to a military hospital, operated by the Italian Red Cross. In 1923, the hotel was sold to CIGA, the Compagnia Italiana Grandi Alberghi (Italian Grand Hotels Company). After the German invasion in 1943, the hotel became the residence and offices of Kurt Mälzer, the German military commander of the city of Rome. In 1944, when Rome was liberated by the Allies, the hotel became the temporary headquarters of General Mark Clark after the US Army entered Rome. The hotel reopened to guests in 1947. In 1953, CIGA expanded the hotel, purchasing the adjacent Banco di Napoli building on the north half of the block and rebuilding its facade to match the rest of the hotel, and also adding a sixth floor to the entire building.

The Aga Khan IV bought CIGA in 1985. He sold the chain to ITT Sheraton in 1994, and they placed the Excelsior in their ITT Sheraton Luxury Collection. In 1998, Sheraton was sold to Starwood Hotels and Resorts, and on March 1, 2000 the Excelsior was transferred to their Westin Hotels & Resorts division and renamed The Westin Excelsior, Rome. The hotel was fully renovated in 2000. Starwood sold the hotel to Qatar-based Katara Hospitality in 2015 for €222 Million.

The hotel is marked by its distinctive cupola, and for the two-story "Villa la Cupola" suite located on the fifth and sixth stories beneath it. This suite is noted as one of the most expensive hotel rooms in the world, and includes hand-painted frescoes, up to seven bedrooms, and a private cinema.

== In popular culture ==
Over the years the hotel has hosted a number of notable guests and has appeared in multiple films.

=== Film history ===
The hotel hosted the cast and crew of Ben-Hur during filming in 1958. La Dolce Vita was filmed around the hotel in 1960 and Two Weeks in Another Town was filmed in the hotel in 1962. Portions of the 1983 miniseries The Winds of War were filmed in the hotel, as was a scene in the 2009 period musical Nine. In the 1973 film The Exorcist, Chris MacNeil (played by Ellen Burstyn) can be heard asking to be connected to the Hotel Excelsior in Rome when she is trying to reach Regan's (played by Linda Blair) father.

=== Kurt Cobain ===
On March 3, 1994, singer Kurt Cobain of Nirvana overdosed in one of the hotel’s suites. He had been in Rome awaiting medical treatment. According to Courtney Love, the overdose was a suicide attempt. One month later, Cobain committed suicide at his home in Seattle.

== Gallery ==
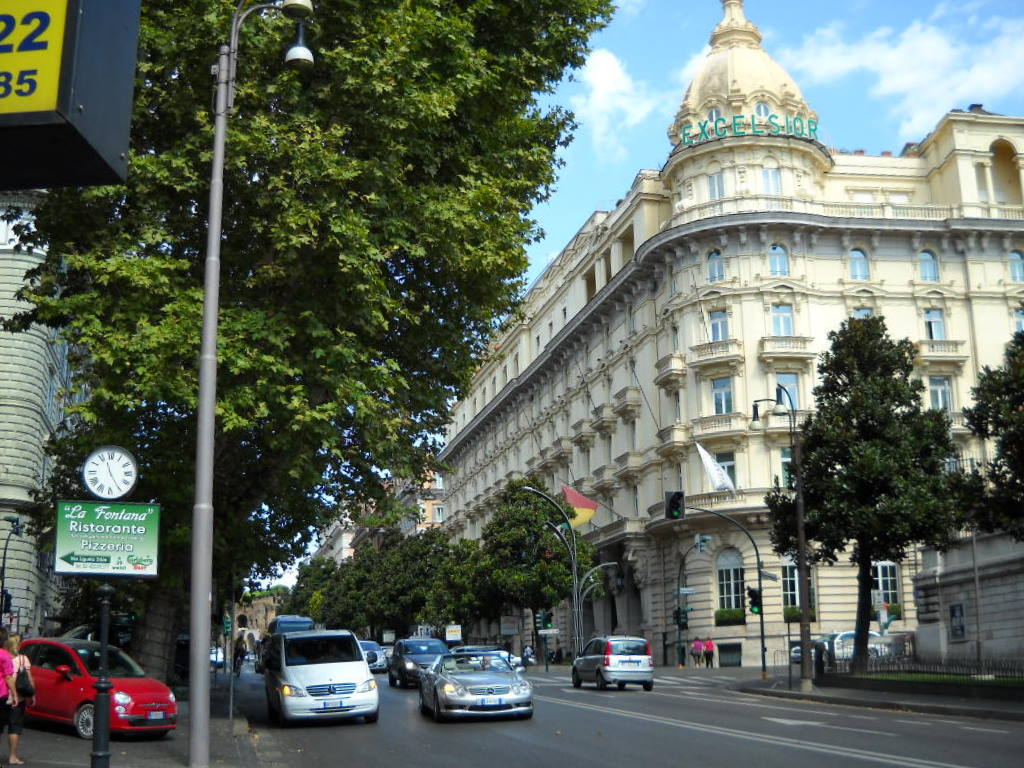
The hotel seen from Via Vittorio Veneto

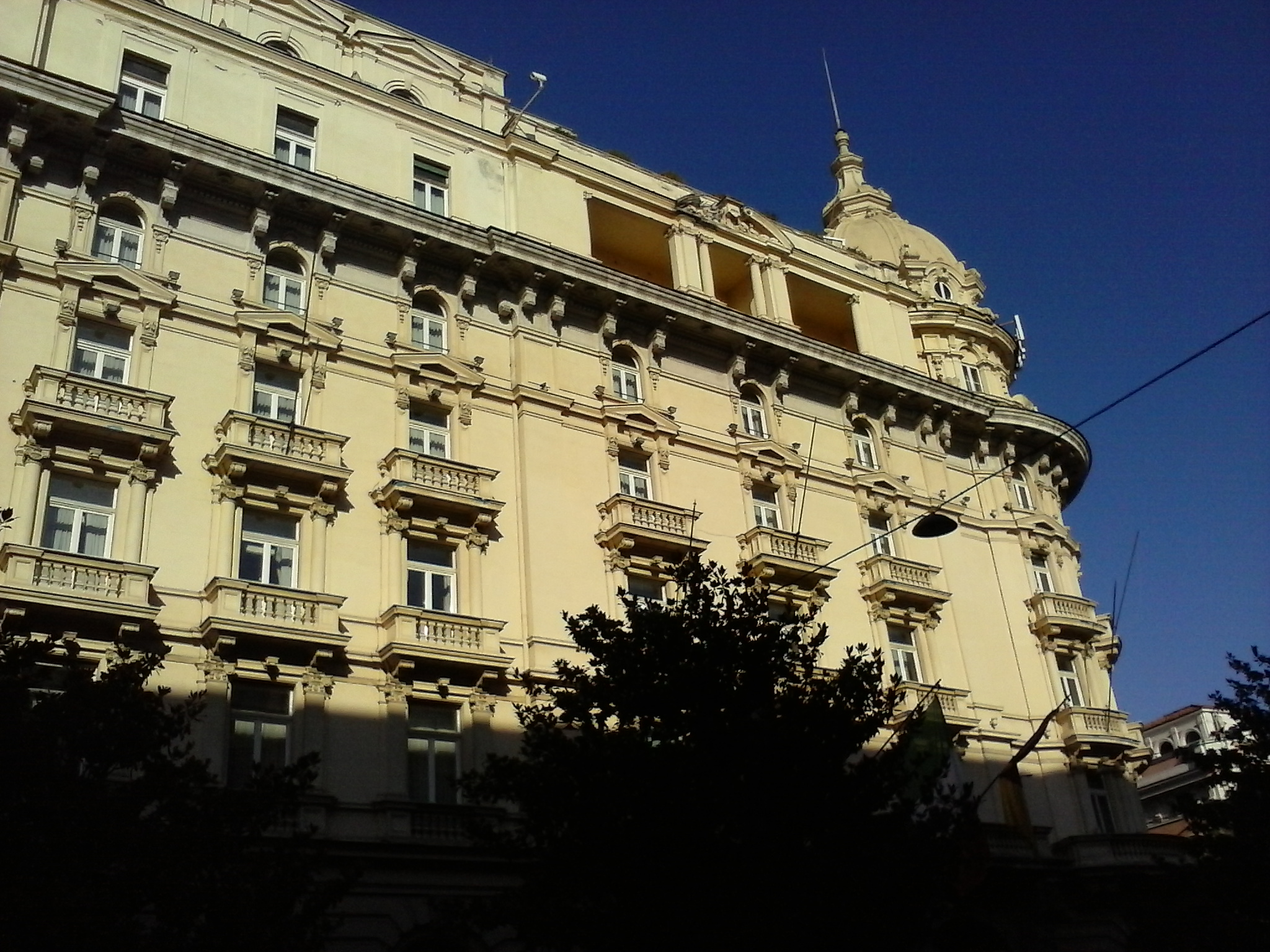
The side of the hotel

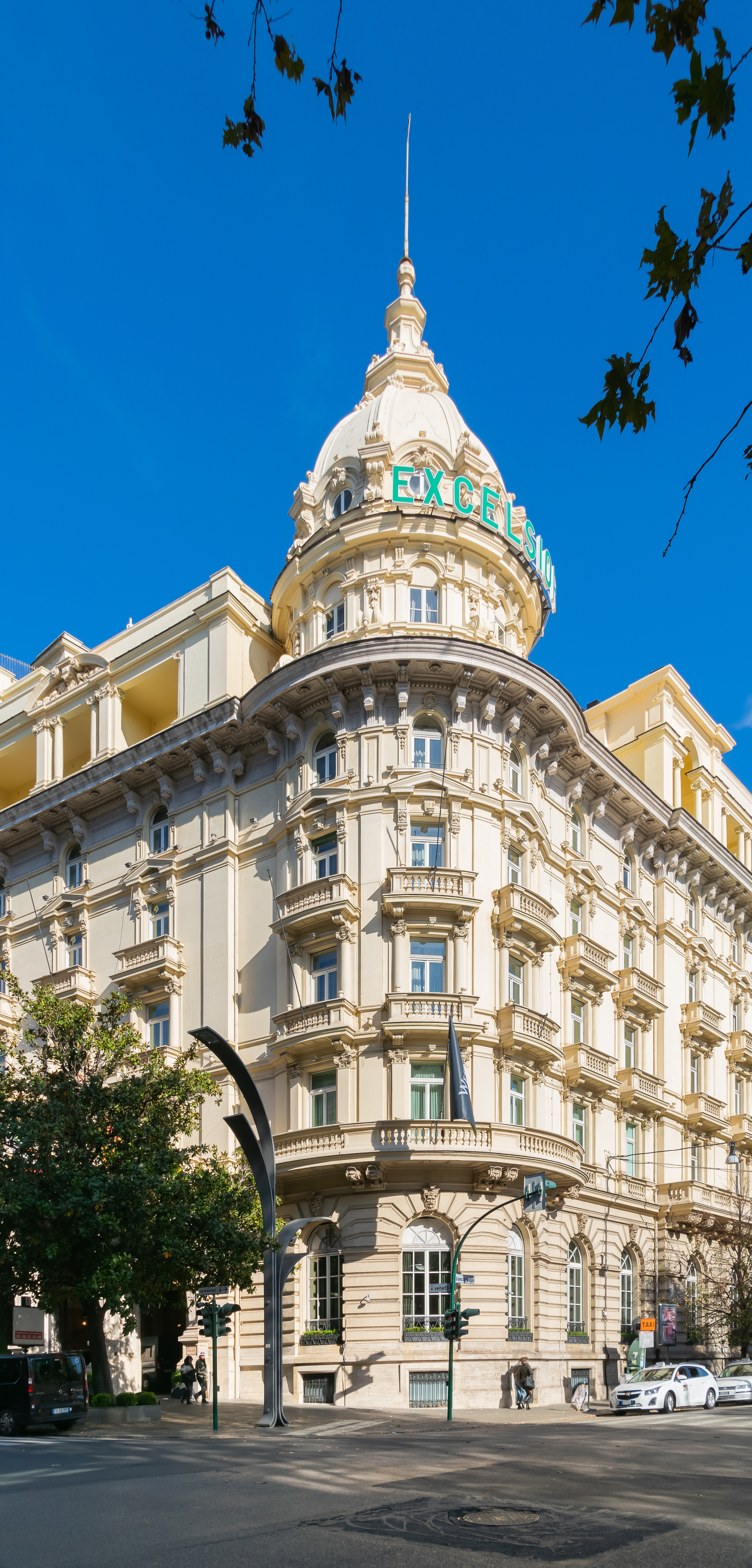
The front of the hotel

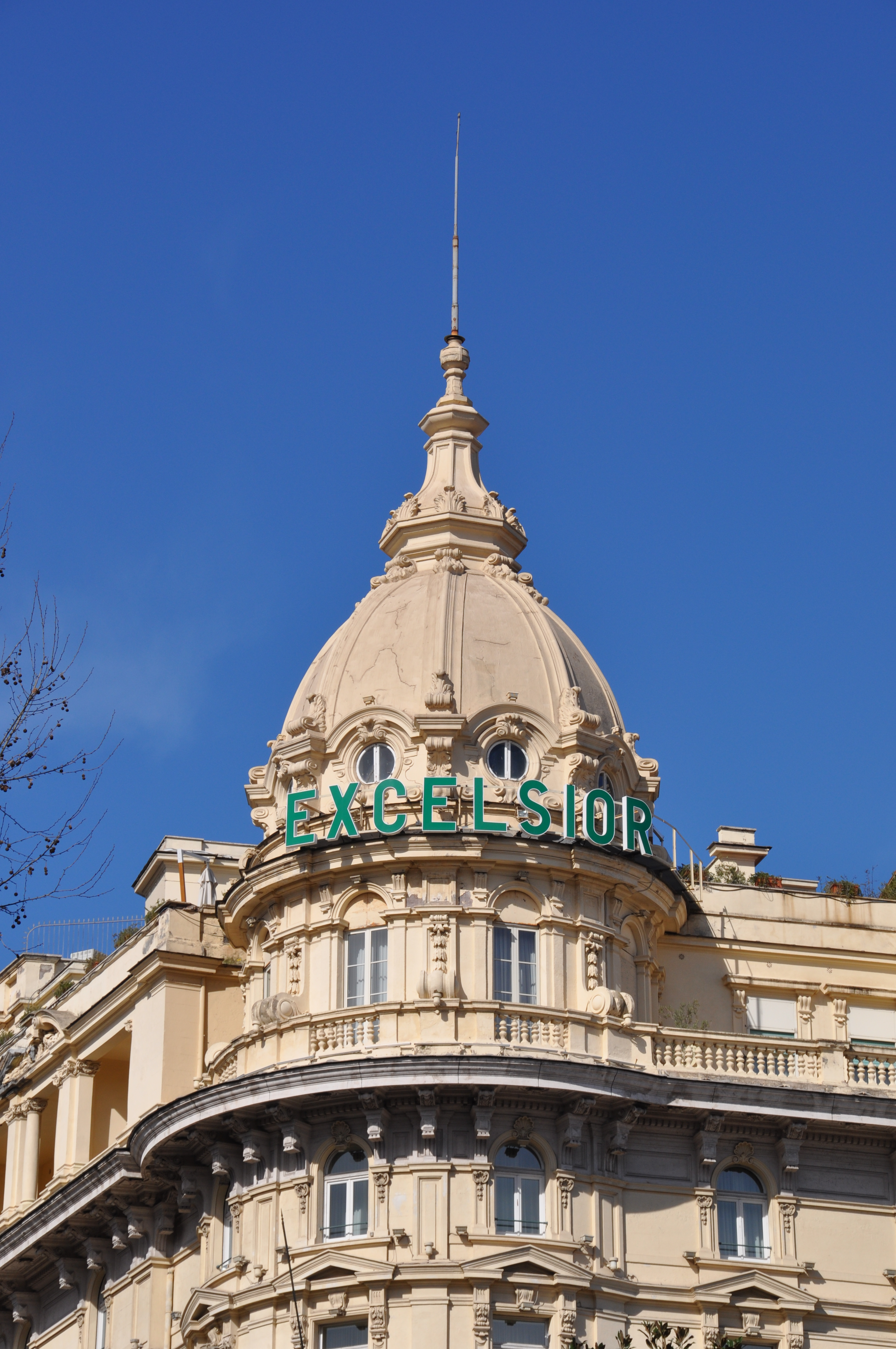
The dome at the top of the hotel
