= Café de Paris (Rome) =

Bar on Via Veneto, Rome

Coordinates: 41°54′28″N 12°29′22″E

The Café de Paris was a famous bar on Via Veneto, one of the best known and most expensive streets in Rome, Italy. It was located at No. 90, close to the United States Embassy. The bar was immortalised in 1960 in the movie La Dolce Vita by Italian filmmaker Federico Fellini, starring Anita Ekberg, Anouk Aimée and Marcello Mastroianni who played a "paparazzo" riding his Vespa in search of celebrities. During the heady days in the 1960s, the café was one of the preferred watering holes of starlets, residual nobility, nouveau riche, and sultans.

== Incidents ==
On 16 September 1985, grenades were thrown at the outdoor tables outside the bar, wounding 38 people. The Lebanese-born Palestinian, Ahmed Hossein Abu Sereya, was arrested and charged with the attack. Sereya, identified as a member of the Abu Nidal Organization, was sentenced to 17 years in prison in 1987.

In 2008, the Italian anti-fraud police announced that the bar had been taken over by 'Ndrangheta crime families from Calabria. The bar was in the hands of the Alvaro 'Ndrangheta clan. Antimafia judges from Reggio Calabria seized the premises in July 2009.

The bar re-opened in November 2011 and was managed by the National Agency for the Administration and Allocation of Confiscated Properties (Agenzia nazionale per l'amministrazione e la destinazione dei beni confiscati). It sold products produced by one of Italy's leading anti-Mafia groups Libera, which ran cooperative farms on lands confiscated from the Mafia and other Italian organized crime groups. "The new administrators wanted the cafe to offer products that are not only good but just", said Father Luigi Ciotti the president of Libera.
