= Gran Café de París =

Café in Seville, Spain, 1906 to 1970s

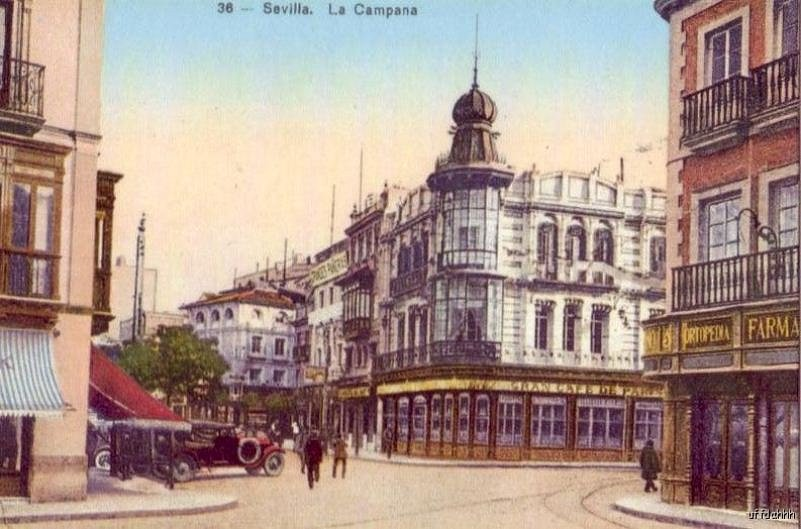
Gran Café París, Seville.

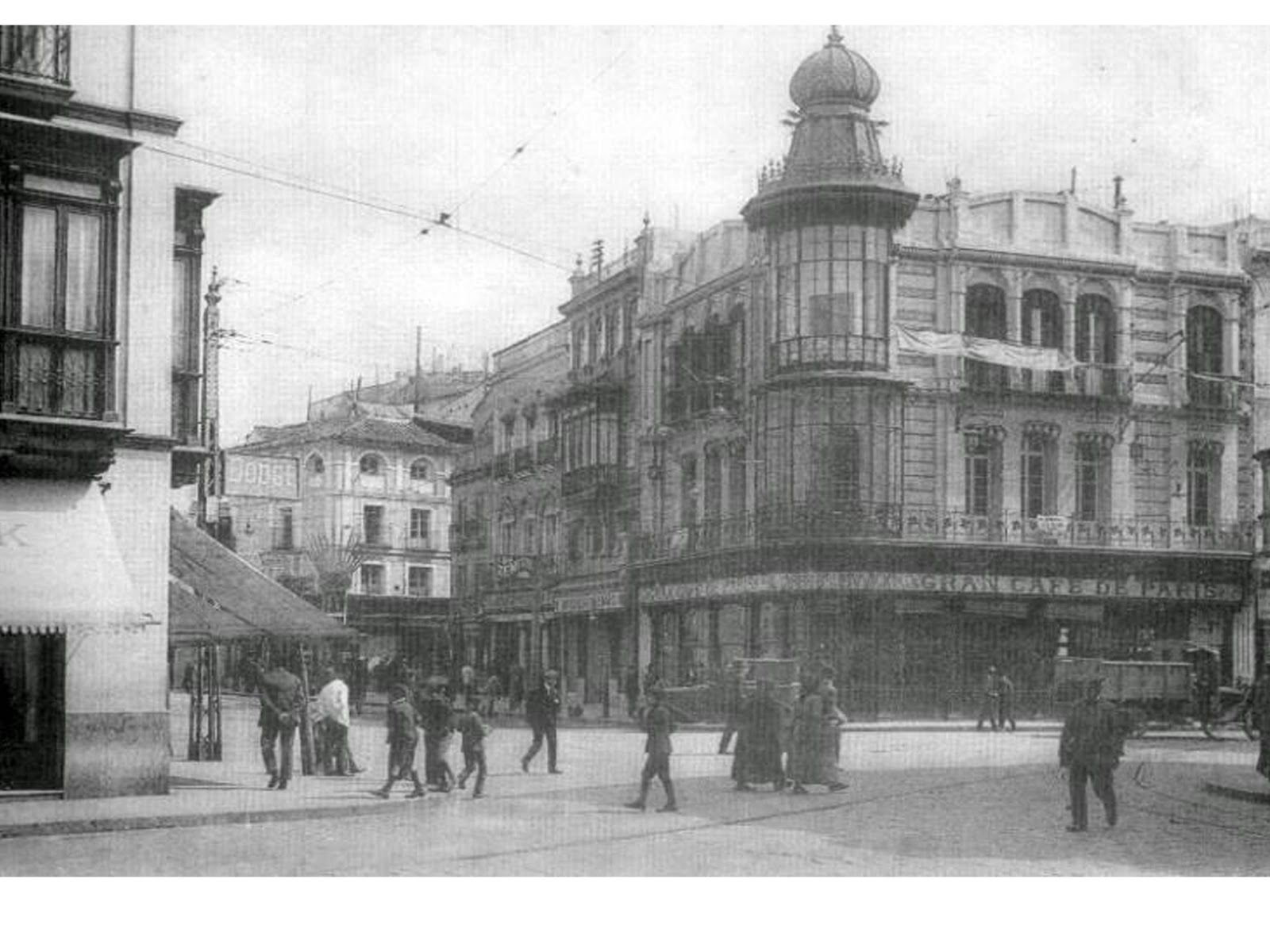
Gran Café París

The Gran Café de París was a modernisme building located in the Plaza de la Campana in Seville.

Located on the corner of O'Donnell with la Campana, the Gran Café de París was a reference in the Sevillian social life during the first decades of the 20th century.

== History ==
Built by Aníbal González between 1904 and 1906 commissioned by Manuel Suárez, full of rooms of large mirrors and chairs with red upholstery.

There were arguing supporters of bullfighting, the football derby in the city. There were also uncountable meetings for discuss the Ibero-American Exposition of 1929, were held the masquerade dances of the Carnivals and was made the last stop before it raised the curtain of the Teatro San Fernando.

During the Spanish Civil War the Gran Café de París was renamed as Café de Roma to avoid confusion with the café of Avenue de l'Opéra in Paris. By then the building had undergone several reforms that had reduced it much of the splendor of its beginnings.

With the name retrieved in the 1940s, it will not last however much the Café Paris as for the next decade did not exist.

The local of the ground floor of the modernisme building was then occupied by a department store, "La Importadora", a kind of bazaar where it could found of all, something new for the time.

The Café París was finally demolished. In its place stands a Burger King.
