= Le Grand Café =

Café in France

Coordinates: 46°33′52″N 3°19′51″E

- "Le Grand jus"
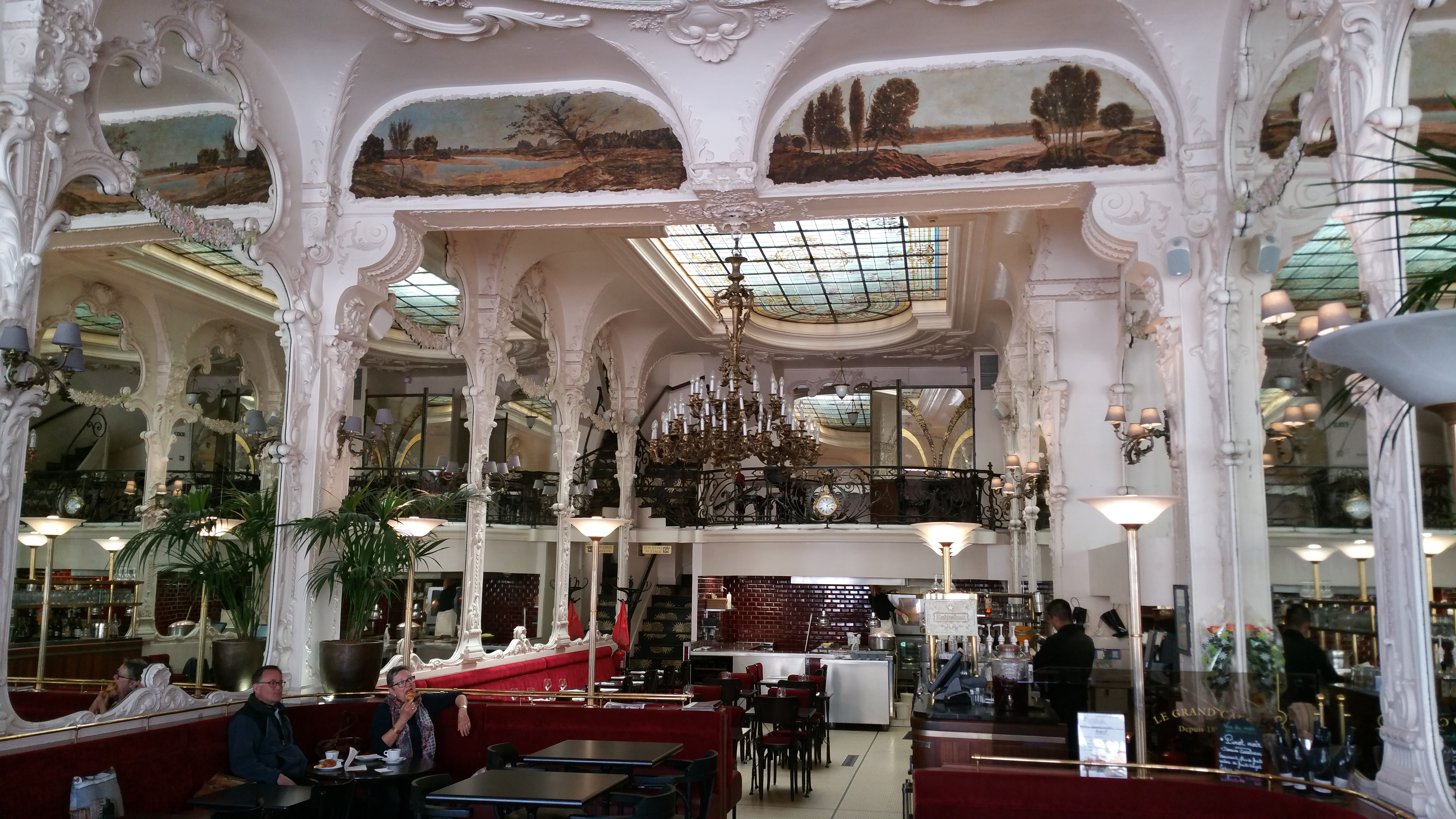
- The ground floor room of Le Grand Café in April 2017
- Interactive map of Le Grand Café
- Location: 49 Place d'Allier, Moulins, Allier, France, 03000
- Designer: Louis Galfione
- Type: Café, Brasserie
- Beginning date: 1898
- Opening date: 1899
- Website: legrandcafe-moulins.fr
- Monument historique since 1978

Le Grand Café is a café and brasserie in Moulins in the French department of Allier, located at 49, place d'Allier, in the town centre. Considered one of the most beautiful cafés in France, it was created in 1898. Its interior architecture and façade are characteristic of the Rococo Revival style of the early 1900s. The main room is decorated with large wall mirrors, stucco pilasters with garlands of foliage, ironwork, various light fixtures including a large bronze chandelier, a ceiling with an allegorical fresco, a glass roof and some wall paintings. Le Grand Café was listed as an official historical monument in February 1978.

The Grand Café was frequented by Coco Chanel (who may have sung there, since at this time Le Grand Café was also a café-chantant) and Georges Simenon during their youths. In his novel Maigret Goes Home, a chapter is set in Le Grand Café but the 1959 movie Maigret et l'Affaire Saint-Fiacre based on the book and directed by Jean Delannoy with Jean Gabin playing Maigret was not shot in the actual café but in interiors constructed in a Paris film studio. The 2008 television movie Coco Chanel had scenes shot in the Grand Café.

== Photos gallery ==
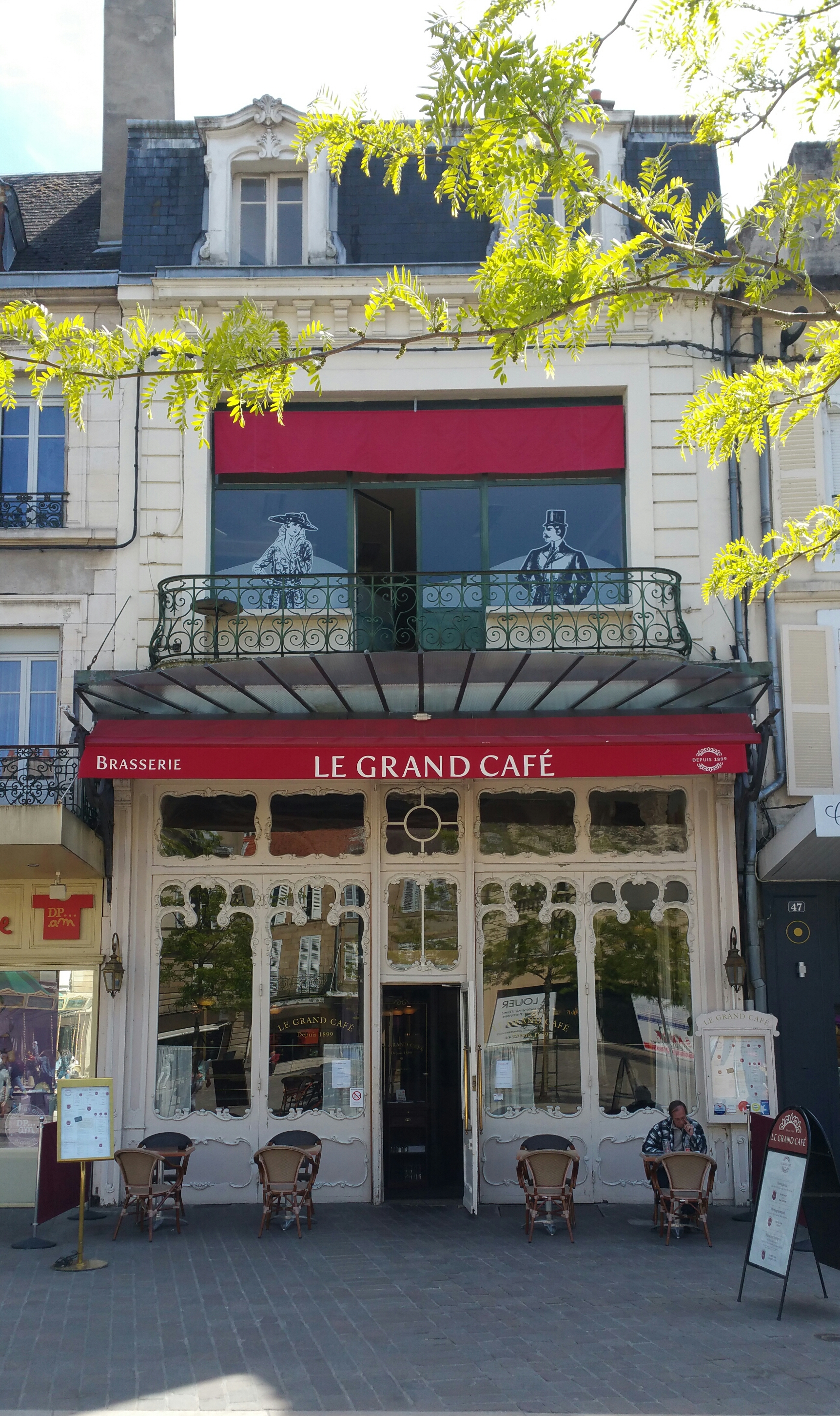
Façade of the Grand Café from the place de l'Allier (Allier Square)

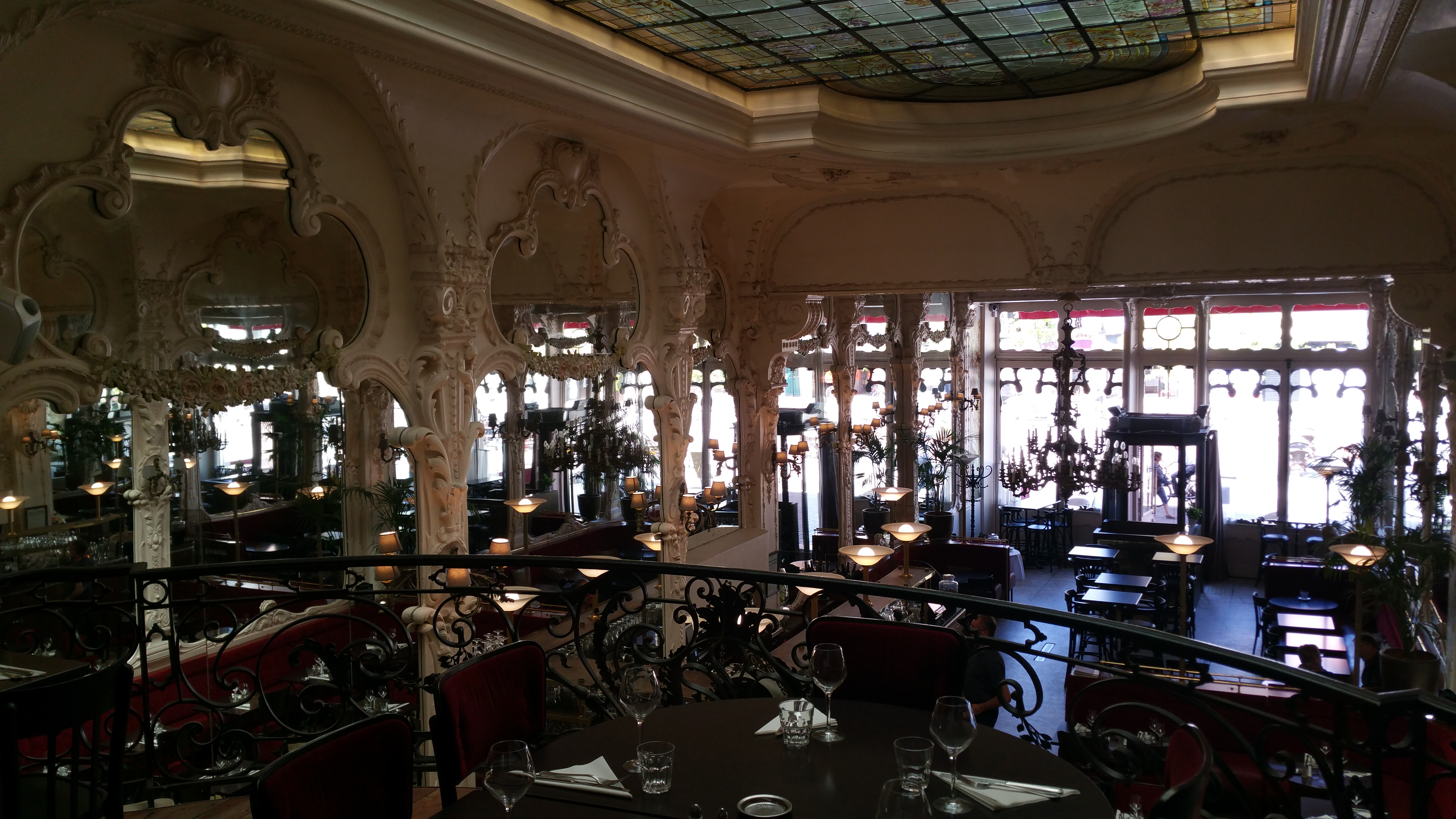
The ground floor room seen from the mezzanine

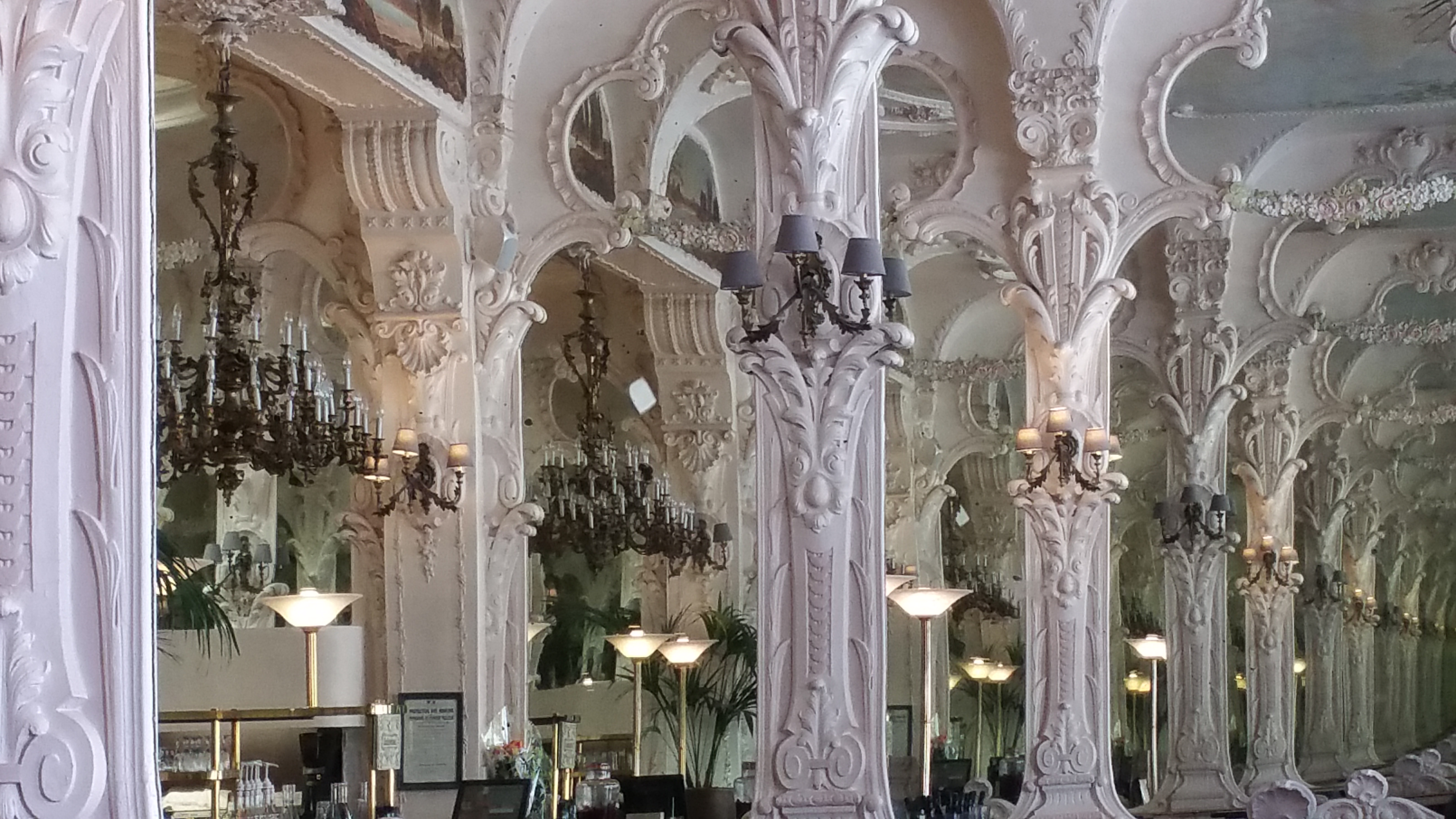
Play of mirrors

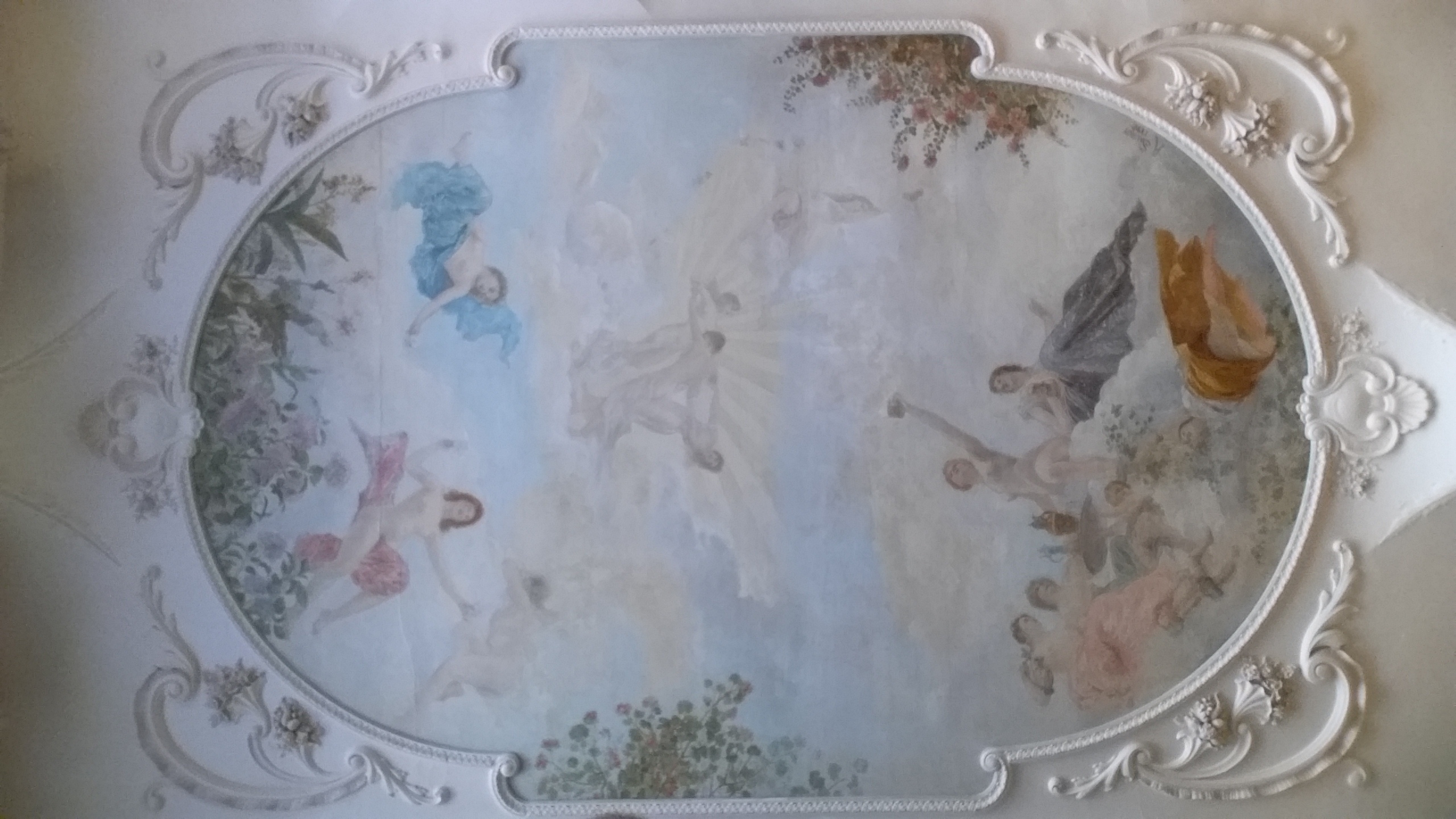
Ceiling painting from Auguste Sauroy showing the Gambrinus legend
